= Hyōgo Prefecture =

Prefecture of Japan

Hyōgo Prefecture 兵庫県
- Prefecture

Japanese transcription(s)
  - Japanese: 兵庫県
  - Rōmaji: Hyōgo-ken
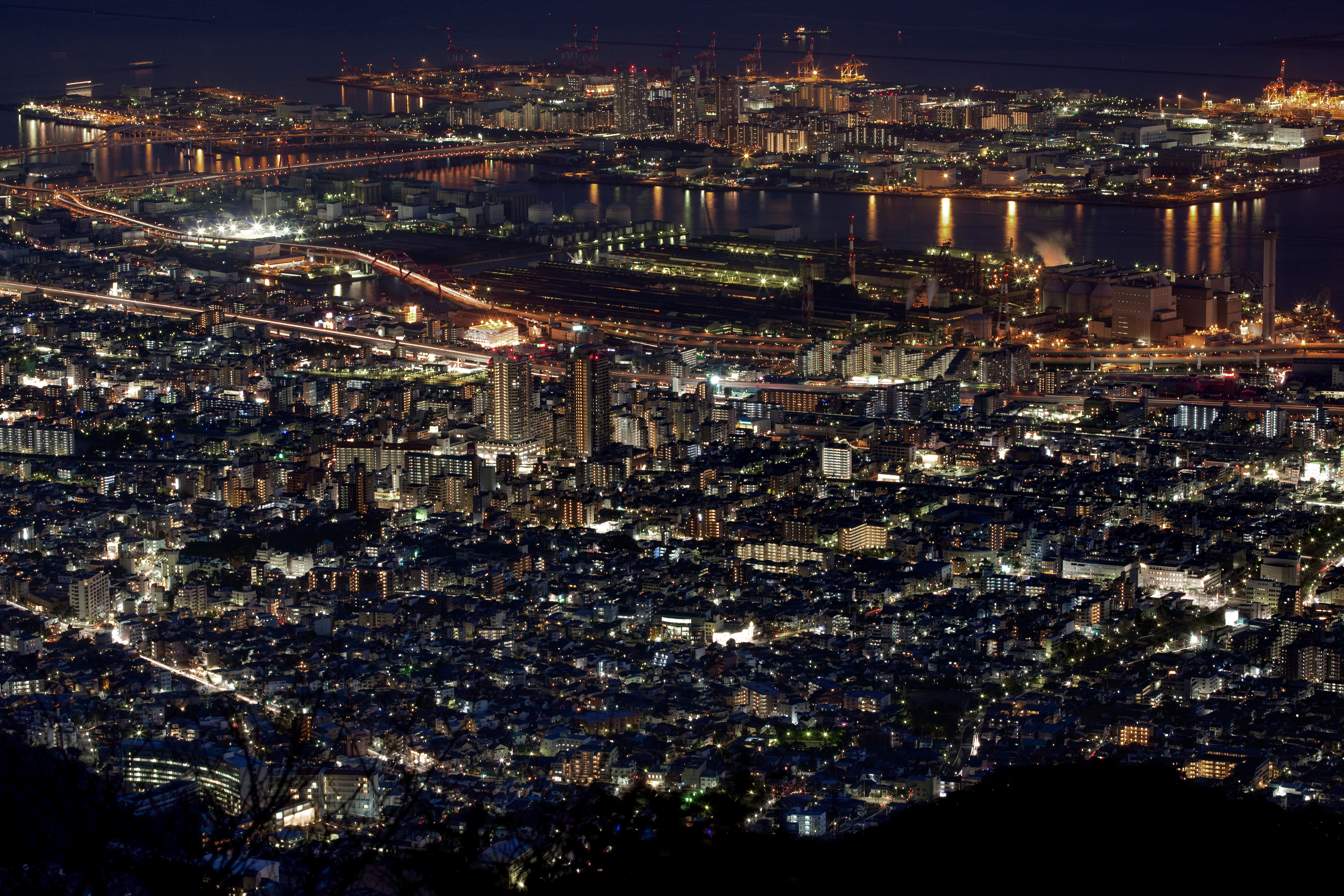
- Rokkō Island and Higashinada District, Kobe City, Hyōgo Prefecture at night, view from Maya Peak

- Flag Symbol
- Anthem: Hyōgo Kenminka (Note: The Hyōgo Prefectural Government has expressed the view that the "Prefectural song does not exist" and denied the fact that currently, this song has been enacted in 1947.)
- Coordinates: 34°41′26.94″N 135°10′59.08″E
- Country: Japan
- Region: Kansai
- Island: Honshū, Awaji
- Capital: Kobe
- Subdivisions: Districts: 8, Municipalities: 41

Government
  - Governor: Motohiko Saitō

Area
  - Total: 8,400.94 km^{2} (3,243.62 sq mi)
  - Rank: 12th

Population (1 February 2025)
  - Total: 5,325,228
  - Rank: 7th
  - Density: 634/km^{2} (1,640/sq mi)

GDP
  - Total: JP¥ 23,462 billion US$ 173.3 billion (2022)
- ISO 3166 code: JP-28
- Legislature: Hyogo Prefectural Assembly
- Website: web.pref.hyogo.lg.jp/fl/english/
- Symbols of Japan
- Bird: Oriental white stork (Ciconia boyciana)
- Flower: Nojigiku (Chrysanthemum japonense)
- Tree: Camphor tree (Cinnamomum camphora)

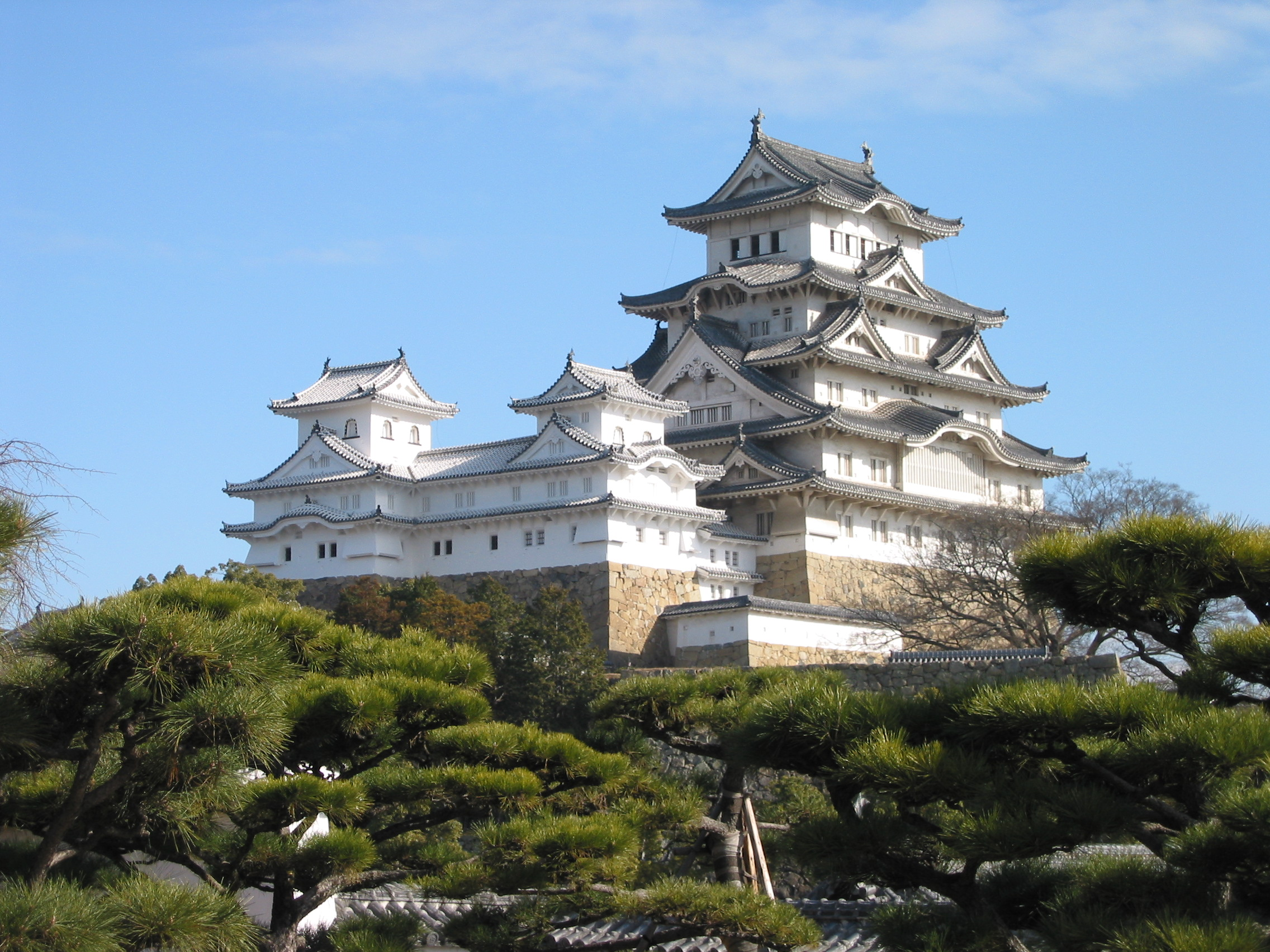
Himeji Castle in Himeji, a UNESCO World Heritage Site

Hyōgo Prefecture (兵庫県, Hyōgo-ken; pronounced [çj̊ó̞ò̞.ɡò̞, -ŋò̞, çj̊ò̞ó̞.ɡó̞.kè̞ɴ̀, çj̊ó̞ó̞.ɡó̞-, -ŋó̞-]) is a prefecture of Japan located in the Kansai region of Honshu. Hyōgo Prefecture has a population of 5,292,593 (as of 1 September 2026) and a geographic area of 8,400 square kilometres (3,200 square miles). Hyōgo Prefecture borders Kyoto Prefecture to the east, Osaka Prefecture to the southeast, and Okayama and Tottori prefectures to the west.

Kobe is the capital and largest city of Hyōgo Prefecture, and the seventh-largest city in Japan, with other major cities including Himeji, Nishinomiya, and Amagasaki. Hyōgo Prefecture's mainland stretches from the Sea of Japan to the Seto Inland Sea, where Awaji Island and a small archipelago of islands belonging to the prefecture are located. Hyōgo Prefecture is a major economic center, transportation hub, and tourist destination in western Japan, with 20% of the prefecture's land area designated as Natural Parks. Hyōgo Prefecture forms part of the Kobe metropolitan area and Osaka metropolitan area, the second-most-populated urban region in Japan after the Greater Tokyo area and one of the world's most productive regions by GDP.

== History ==
Map of Hyogo Prefecture with former provincial boundaries and current prefectural offices: 1.□Kobe city (divided between Harima and Settsu) 2.■Settsu (Hanshin South office) 3.■Settsu (Hanshin North office) 4.■Harima East office 5.■Harima North office 6.■Harima Central office 7.■Harima West office 9.■Tanba office 8.■Tajima office 10.■Awaji office Areas beyond Harima West belonged to Mimasaka (north) and Bizen (south)

Present-day Hyōgo Prefecture includes the former provinces of Harima, Tajima, Awaji, and parts of Tanba and Settsu.

In 1180, near the end of the Heian period, Emperor Antoku, Taira no Kiyomori, and the Imperial court moved briefly to Fukuhara, in what is now the city of Kobe. There the capital remained for five months. Himeji Castle, a UNESCO World Heritage Site, is in the city of Himeji.

Southern Hyōgo Prefecture was severely devastated by the 6.9 Mw Great Hanshin earthquake of 1995, which destroyed major parts of Kobe and Awaji, as well as Nishinomiya and Ashiya and the neighboring Osaka Prefecture, killing nearly 6,500 people.

== Geography ==
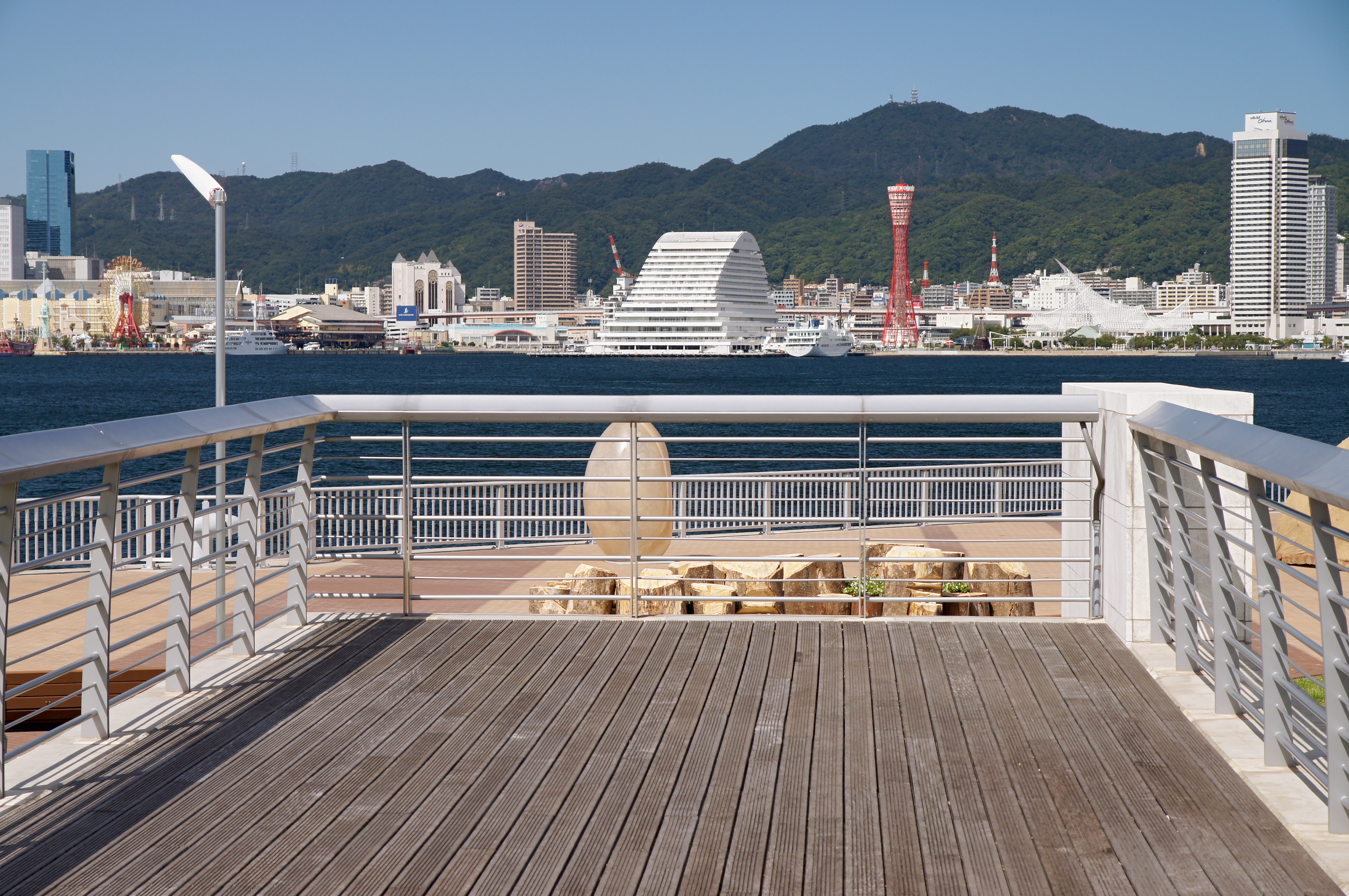
Kobe

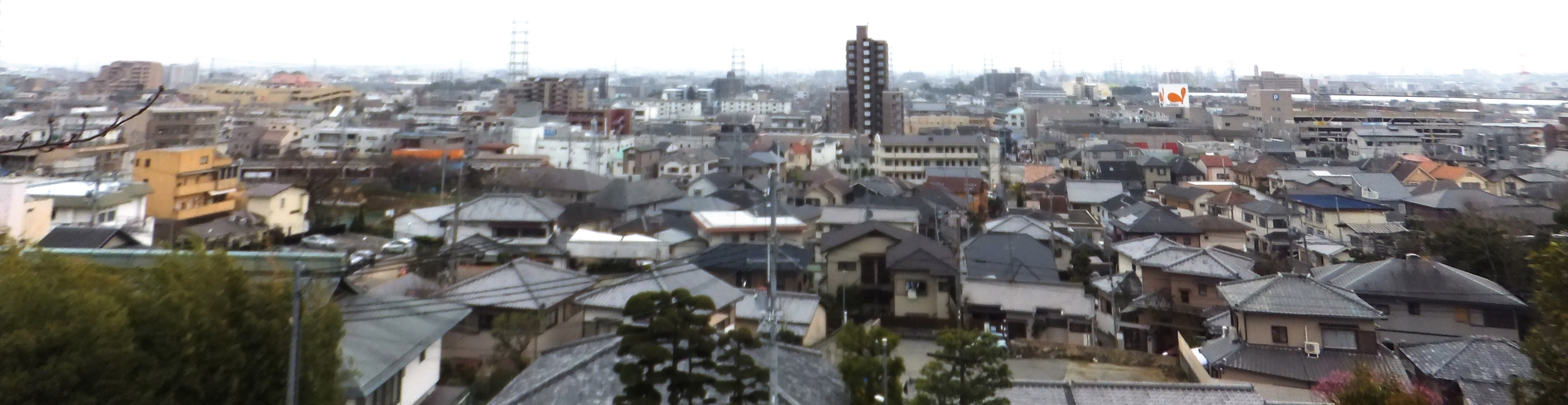
Takarazuka

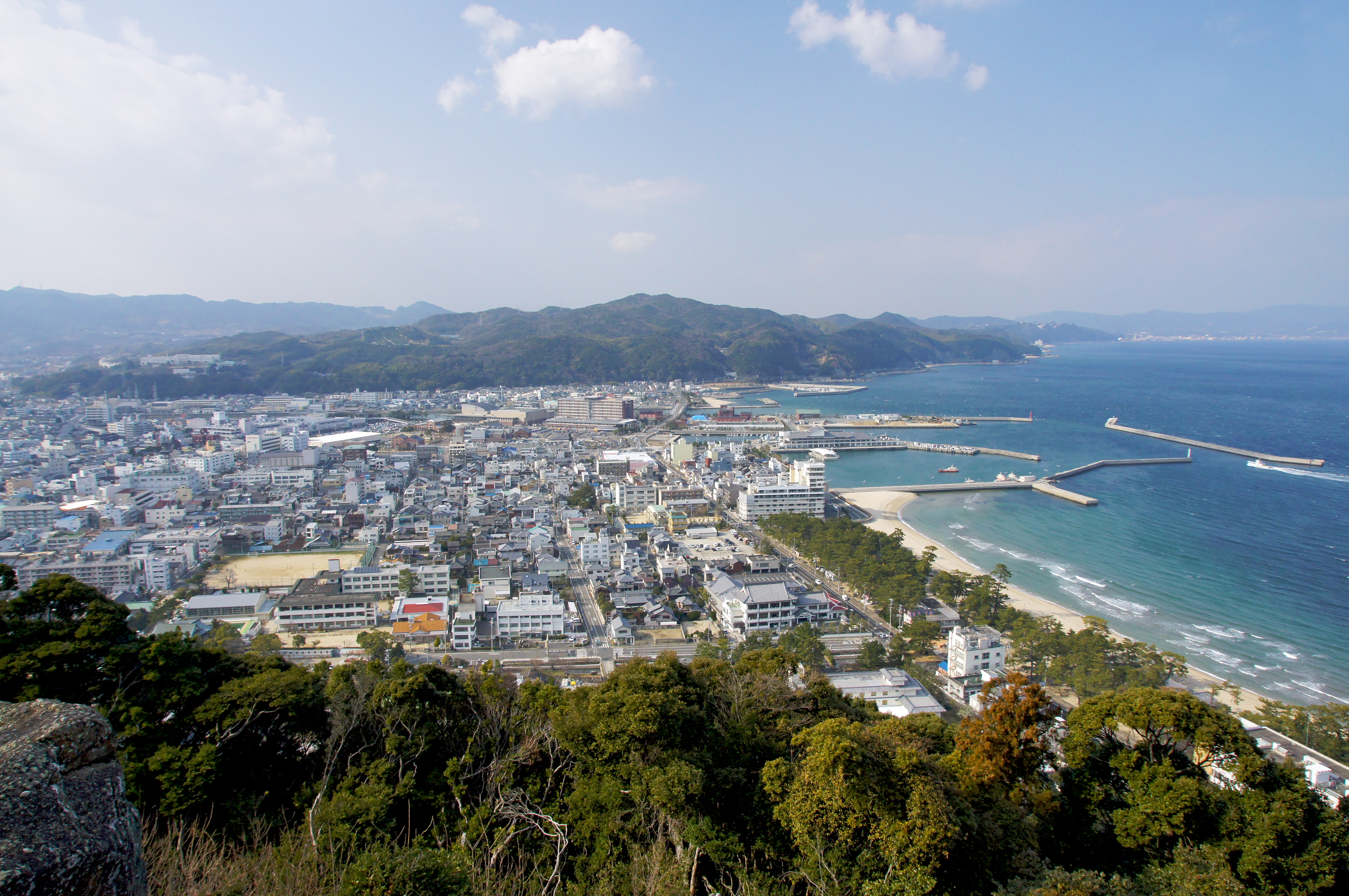
Sumoto

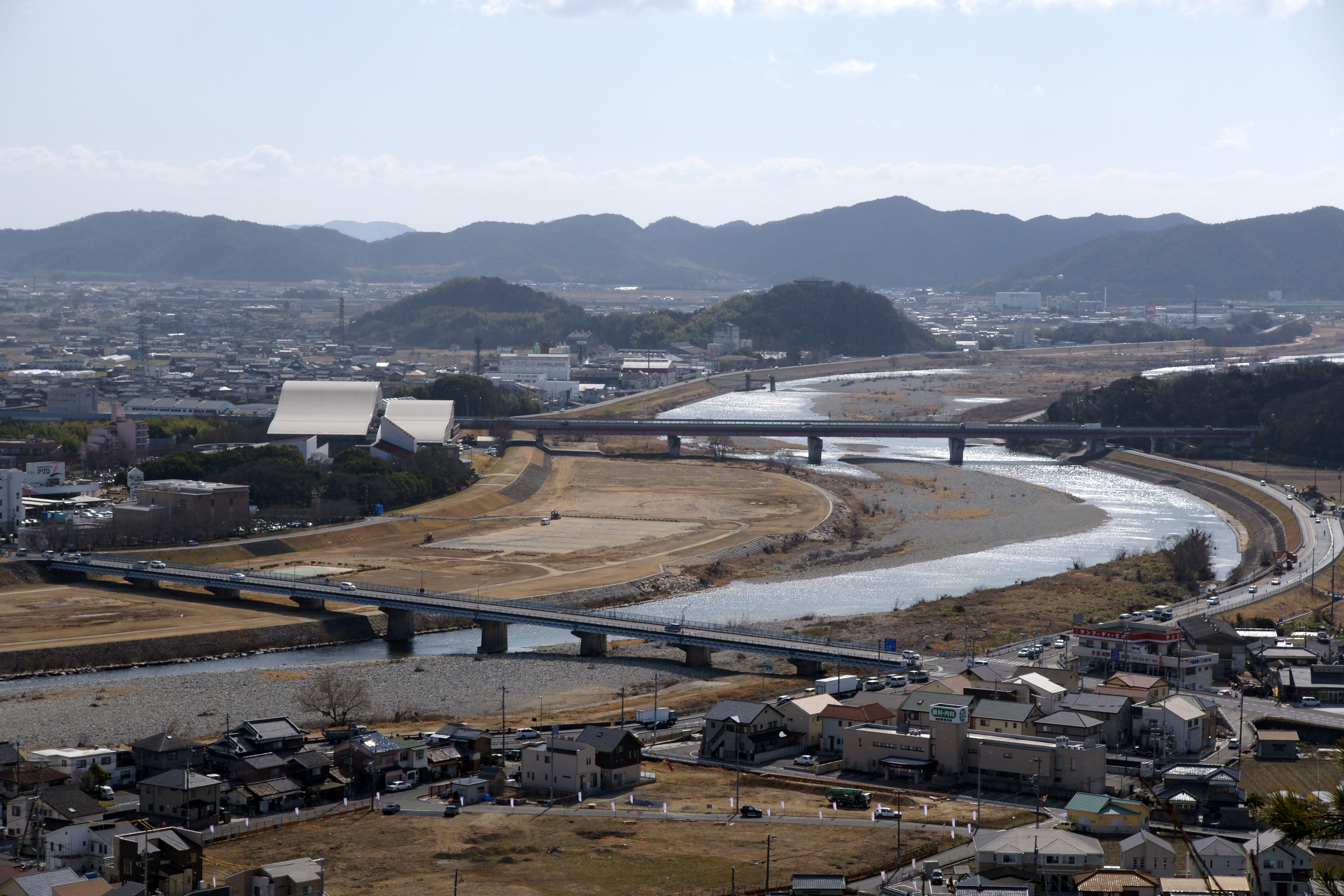
Tatsuno

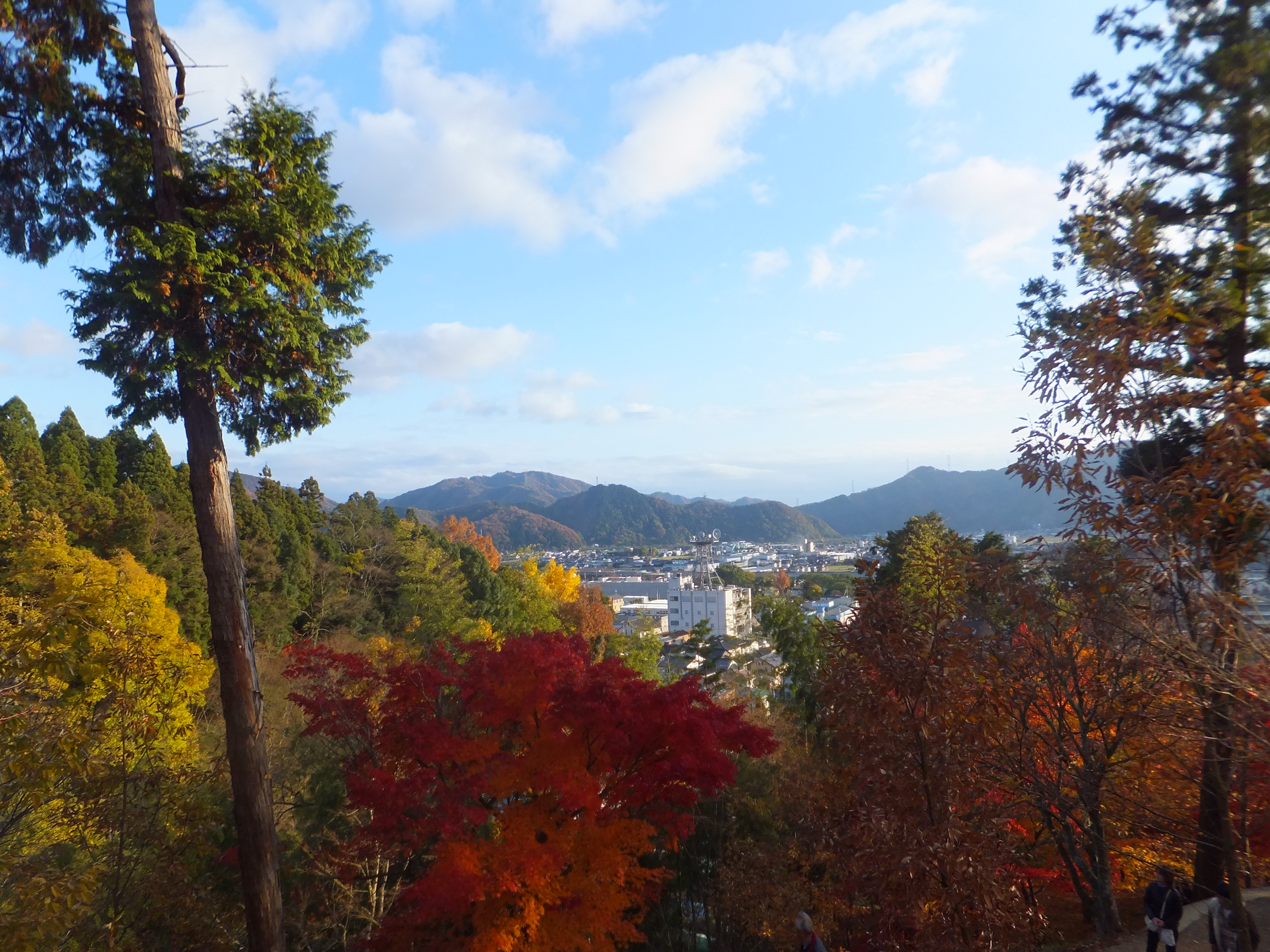
Shiso

Historical population
Year	Pop.	±% p.a.
1890	1,551,367	—
1903	1,833,957	+1.30%
1913	2,143,791	+1.57%
1920	2,301,799	+1.02%
1925	2,454,679	+1.29%
1930	2,646,301	+1.51%
1935	2,923,249	+2.01%
1940	3,221,232	+1.96%
1945	2,821,892	−2.61%
1950	3,309,935	+3.24%
1955	3,620,947	+1.81%
1960	3,906,487	+1.53%
1965	4,309,944	+1.99%
1970	4,667,928	+1.61%
1975	4,992,140	+1.35%
1980	5,144,892	+0.60%
1985	5,278,050	+0.51%
1990	5,405,040	+0.48%
1995	5,401,877	−0.01%
2000	5,550,574	+0.54%
2005	5,590,601	+0.14%
2010	5,588,133	−0.01%
2015	5,536,989	−0.18%

Hyōgo has coastlines on two seas: to the north, the Sea of Japan, to the south, the Seto Inland Sea. On Awaji Island, Hyōgo borders the Pacific Ocean coastline in the Kii Channel. The northern portion is sparsely populated, except for the city of Toyooka. The central highlands are only populated by tiny villages. Most of Hyōgo's population lives on the southern coast, which is part of the Osaka-Kobe-Kyoto metropolitan area. Awaji is an island that separates the Inland Sea and Osaka Bay, lying between Honshu and Shikoku.

Summertime weather throughout Hyōgo is hot and humid. As for winter conditions, the north of Hyōgo tends to receive abundant snow, whilst the south receives only the occasional flurry.

Hyōgo borders on Osaka Prefecture, Kyoto Prefecture, Tottori Prefecture and Okayama Prefecture.

As of 31 March 2008, 20% of the total land area of the prefecture was designated as Natural Parks, namely the Sanin Kaigan and Setonaikai National Parks; Hyōnosen-Ushiroyama-Nagisan Quasi-National Park; and Asago Gunzan, Harima Chūbu Kyūryō, Inagawa Keikoku, Izushi-Itoi, Kasagatayama-Sengamine, Kiyomizu-Tōjōko-Tachikui, Onzui-Chikusa, Seiban Kyūryō, Seppiko-Mineyama, Tajima Sangaku, and Taki Renzan Prefectural Natural Parks.

=== Current municipalities ===
Municipalities in Hyōgo Prefecture Government Ordinance Designated City City Town

=== Cities ===
30 cities are located in Hyōgo Prefecture:

Name		Area (km^{2})	Population	Map
Rōmaji	Kanji	Area (km^{2})	Population	Map
Aioi	相生市	90.40	28,208	
Akashi	明石市	49.42	305,925	
Akō	赤穂市	126.85	45,747	
Amagasaki	尼崎市	50.72	455,555	
Asago	朝来市	403.06	28,971	
Ashiya	芦屋市	18.47	92,976	
Awaji	淡路市	184.32	42,597	
Himeji	姫路市	534.35	525,682	
Itami	伊丹市	25.00	197,215	
Kakogawa	加古川市	138.48	255,523	
Kasai	加西市	150.98	42,494	
Katō	加東市	157.55	39,628	
Kawanishi	川西市	53.44	155,165	
Kobe (capital)	神戸市	557.02	1,522,188	
Miki	三木市	176.51	75,009	
Minamiawaji	南あわじ市	229.01	45,489	
Nishinomiya	西宮市	99.96	484,368	
Nishiwaki	西脇市	132.44	39,001	
Ono	小野市	92.94	47,609	
Sanda	三田市	210.32	108,452	
Shisō	宍粟市	658.54	35,639	
Sumoto	洲本市	182.38	42,094	
Takarazuka	宝塚市	101.80	221,846	
Takasago	高砂市	34.38	86,030	
Tamba	丹波市	493.21	62,152	
Tamba-Sasayama	丹波篠山市	377.59	40,050	
Tatsuno	たつの市	210.87	74,414	
Toyooka	豊岡市	697.55	74,268	
Yabu	養父市	422.91	22,177	

=== Towns ===
These are the towns in each district:

Name		Area (km^{2})	Population	District	Map
Rōmaji	Kanji	Area (km^{2})	Population	District	Map
Fukusaki	福崎町	45.79	18,742	Kanzaki District	
Harima	播磨町	9.13	34,735	Kako District	
Ichikawa	市川町	82.67	11,275	Kanzaki District	
Inagawa	猪名川町	90.33	29,579	Kawabe District	
Inami	稲美町	34.92	30,622	Kako District	
Kami	香美町	368.77	16,256	Mikata District	
Kamigōri	上郡町	150.26	14,179	Akō District	
Kamikawa	神河町	202.23	10,794	Kanzaki District	
Sayō	佐用町	307.44	15,701	Sayō District	
Shin'onsen	新温泉町	241.01	12,814	Mikata District	
Taishi	太子町	22.61	33,753	Ibo District	
Taka	多可町	185.19	19,589	Taka District	

=== Islands ===
- Awaji Island
- Ieshima Islands

Two major artificial islands are located Hyōgo Prefecture:

- Port Island
- Rokkō Island

=== National parks ===
- Hyōnosen-Ushiroyama-Nagisan Quasi-National Park
- Sanin Kaigan National Park
- Setonaikai National Park
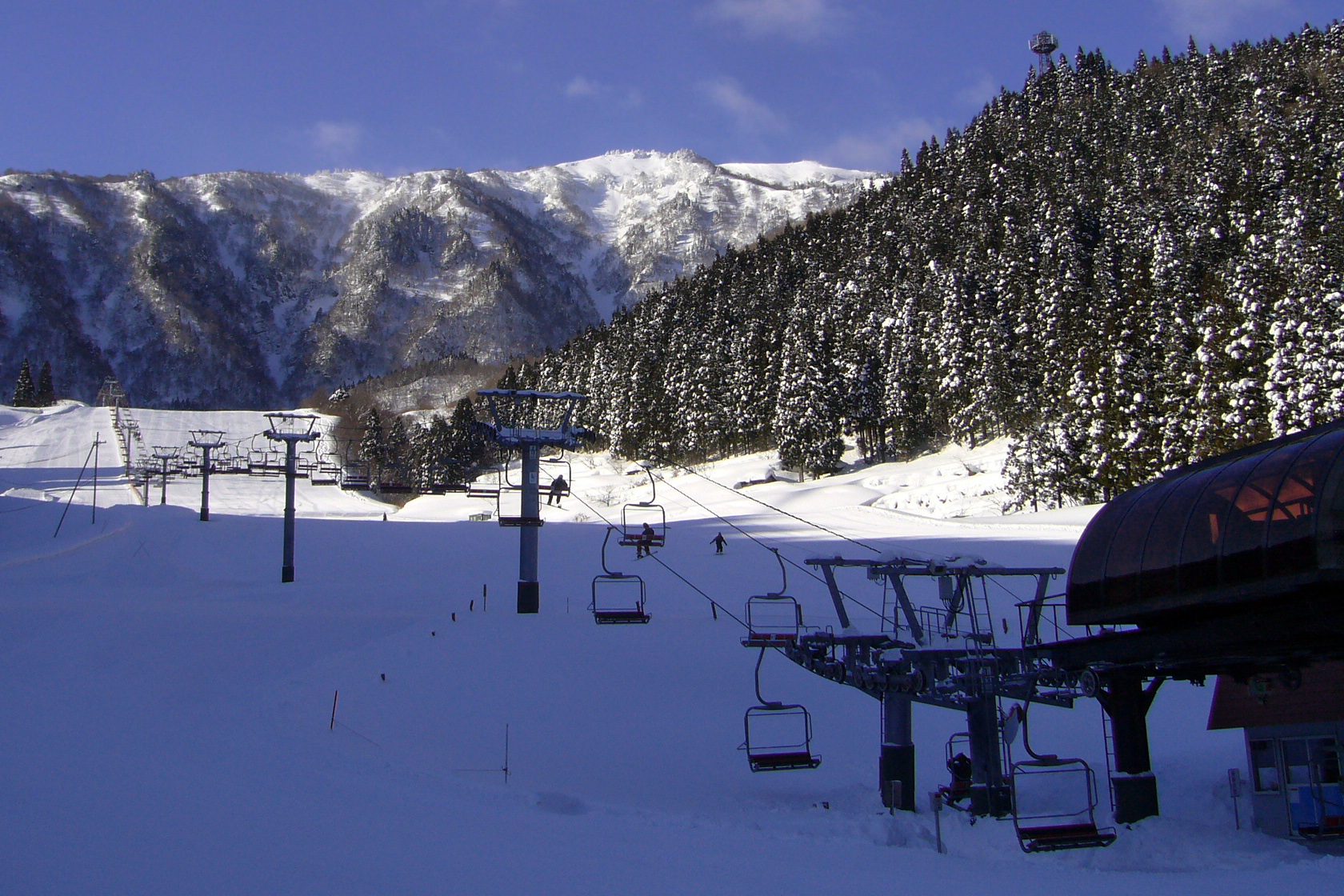
Hyōnosen-Ushiroyama-Nagisan Quasi-National Park (Mt. Hyonosen view from Yabu)

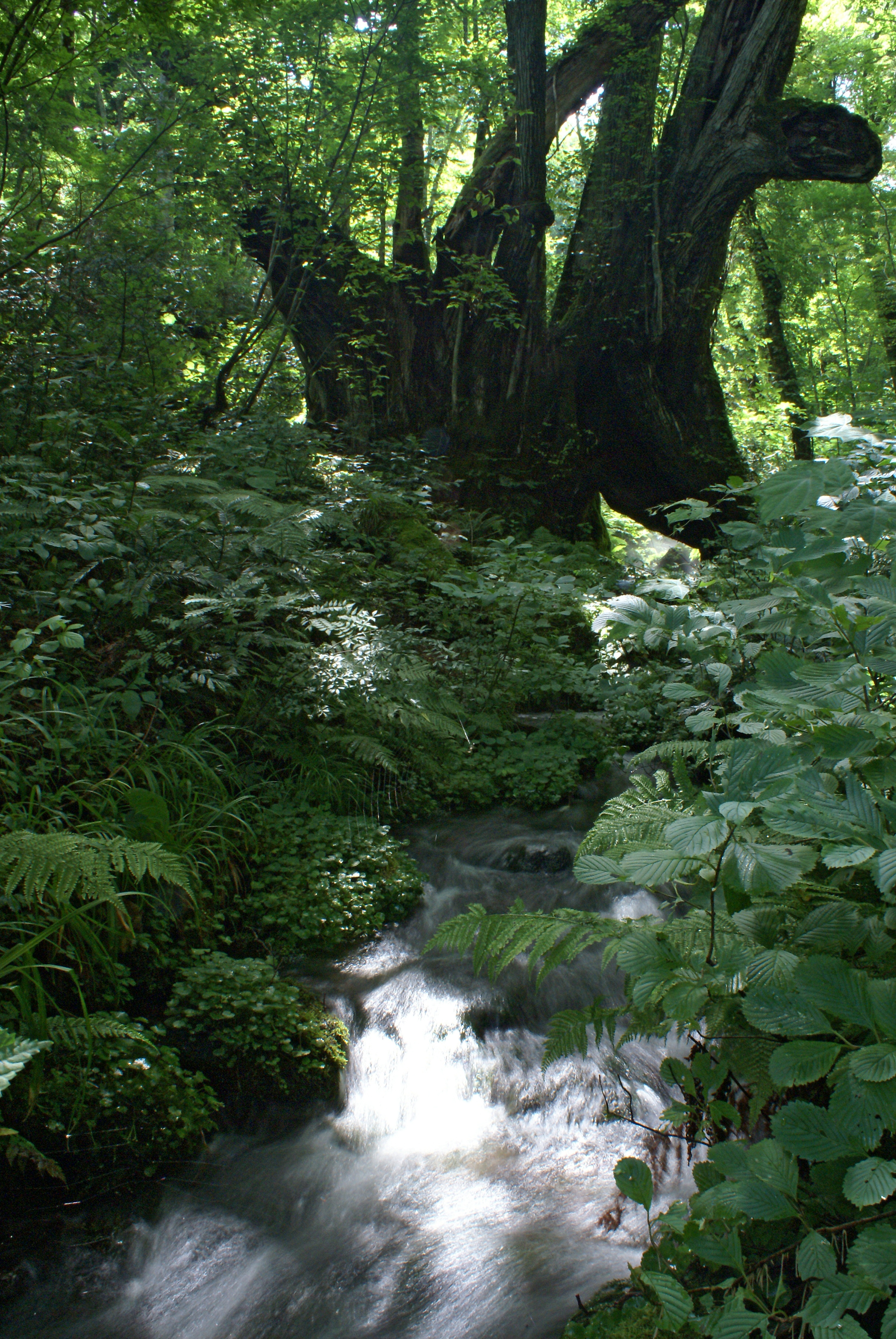
Hyōnosen-Ushiroyama-Nagisan Quasi-National Park (Torokawataira in Kami)

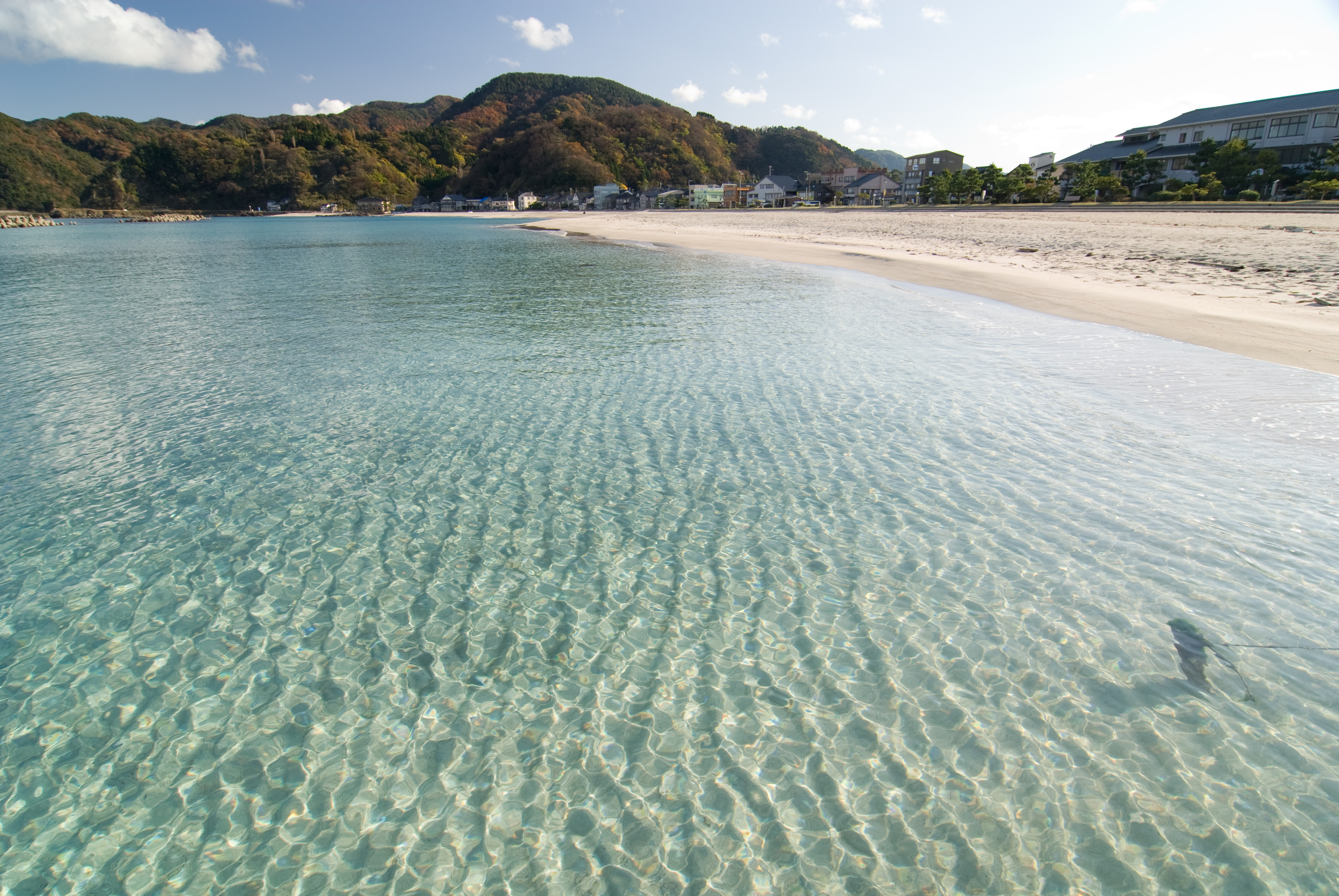
Sanin Kaigan National Park (Takeno Beach in Toyooka)

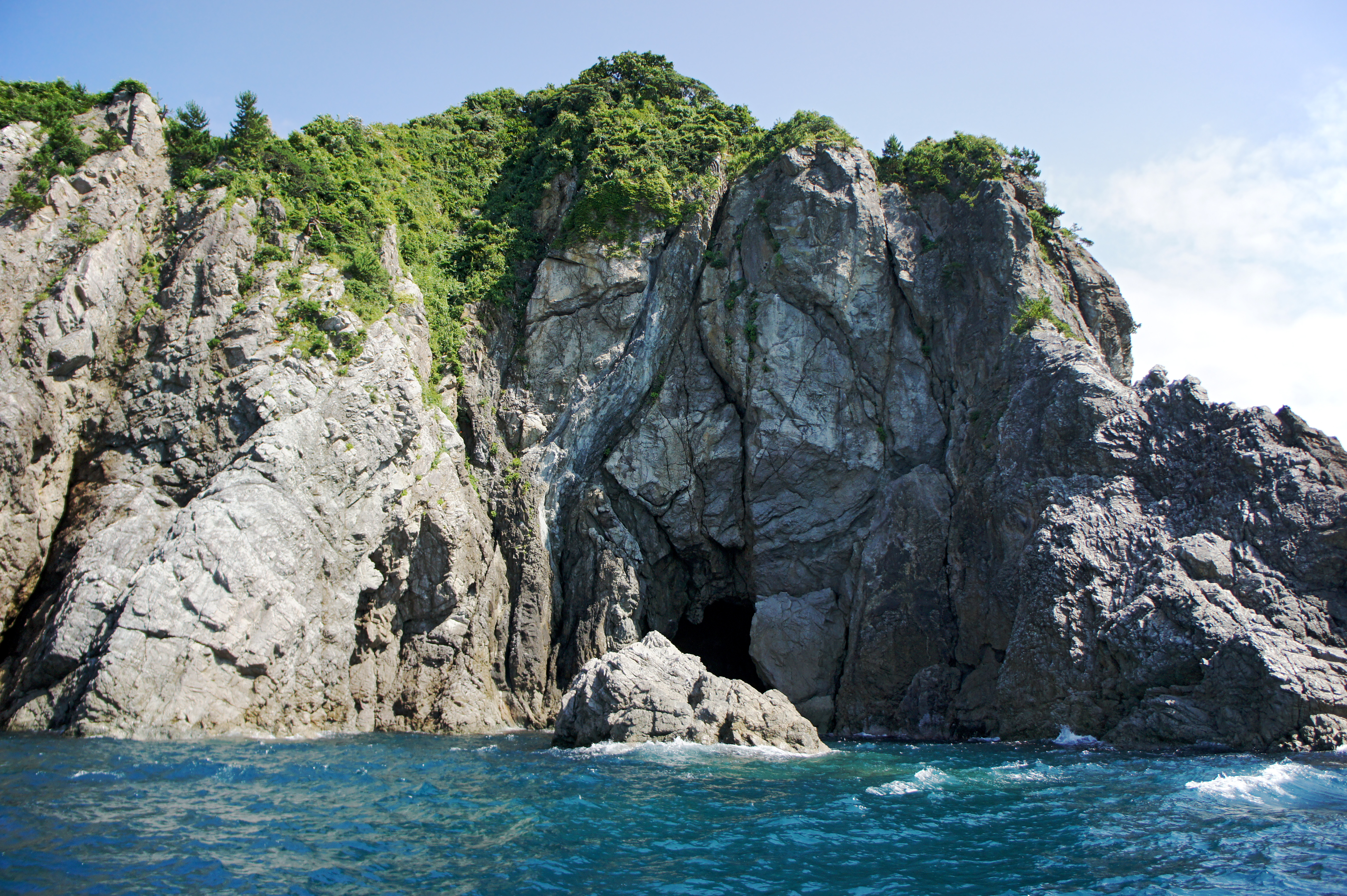
Sanin Kaigan National Park (Tajima-mihonoura of Sanin Coast in Shinonsen)

=== Future mergers ===
The city of Akō and the only town in Akō District (Kamigōri), were scheduled to merge and the city would still retain the name Akō. Akō District would be defunct if the merger was successful. However, the merger has not taken place.

== Economy ==
Hyogo prefecture population pyramid in 2020

As in all prefectures nationwide, agriculture, forestry, and fisheries play a big role in the economy of Hyogo Prefecture. Hyōgo Prefecture also has an IT industry, many heavy industries, metal and medical, Kobe Port being one of the largest ports in Japan. Kobe Port also hosts one of the world's fastest supercomputers, and Hyogo Prefecture passed laws to keep Kobe Port free of nuclear weapons (a nuclear-free zone) since the year 1975.

Hyōgo is a part of the Hanshin Industrial Region. There are two research institutes of Riken, natural sciences research institute in Japan, in Kobe and Harima. "SPring-8", a synchrotron radiation facility, is in Harima.

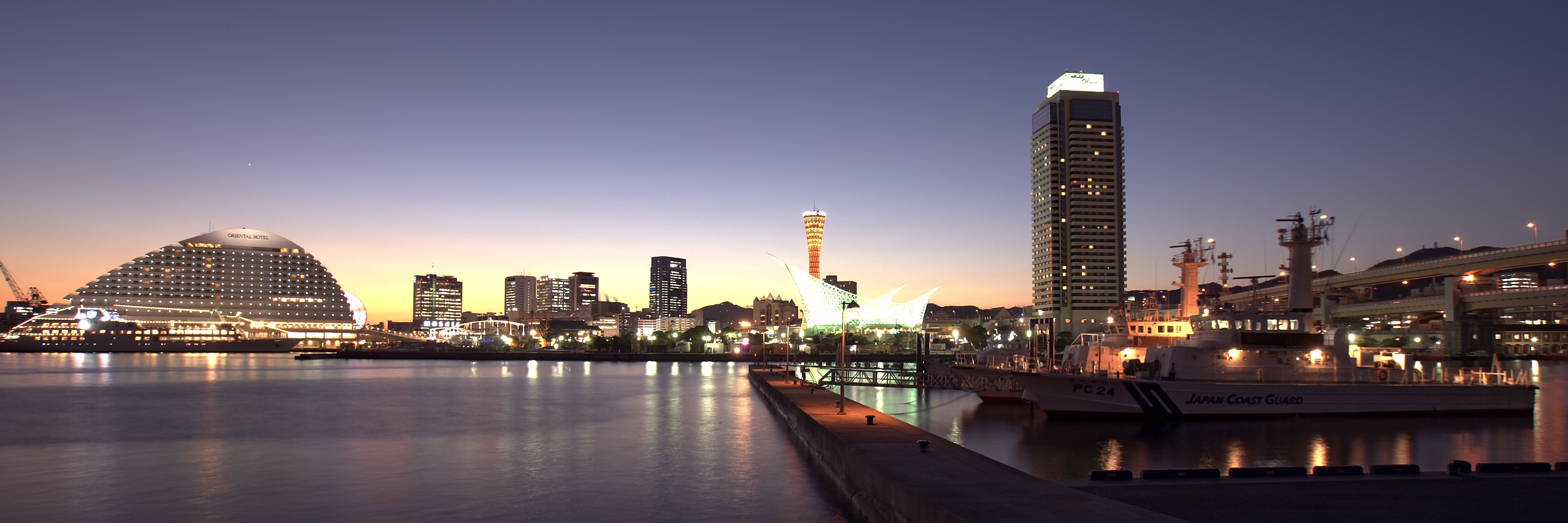
Kobe Port

== Culture ==
=== National Treasures of Japan ===
- Chōkō-ji in Katō
- Chorakuji in Kami, Hyōgo (Mikata)
- Himeji Castle in Himeji (UNESCO World Heritage Site)
- Ichijō-ji in Kasai
- Jōdo-ji in Ono
- Kakurin-ji in Kakogawa
- Taisan-ji in Kobe
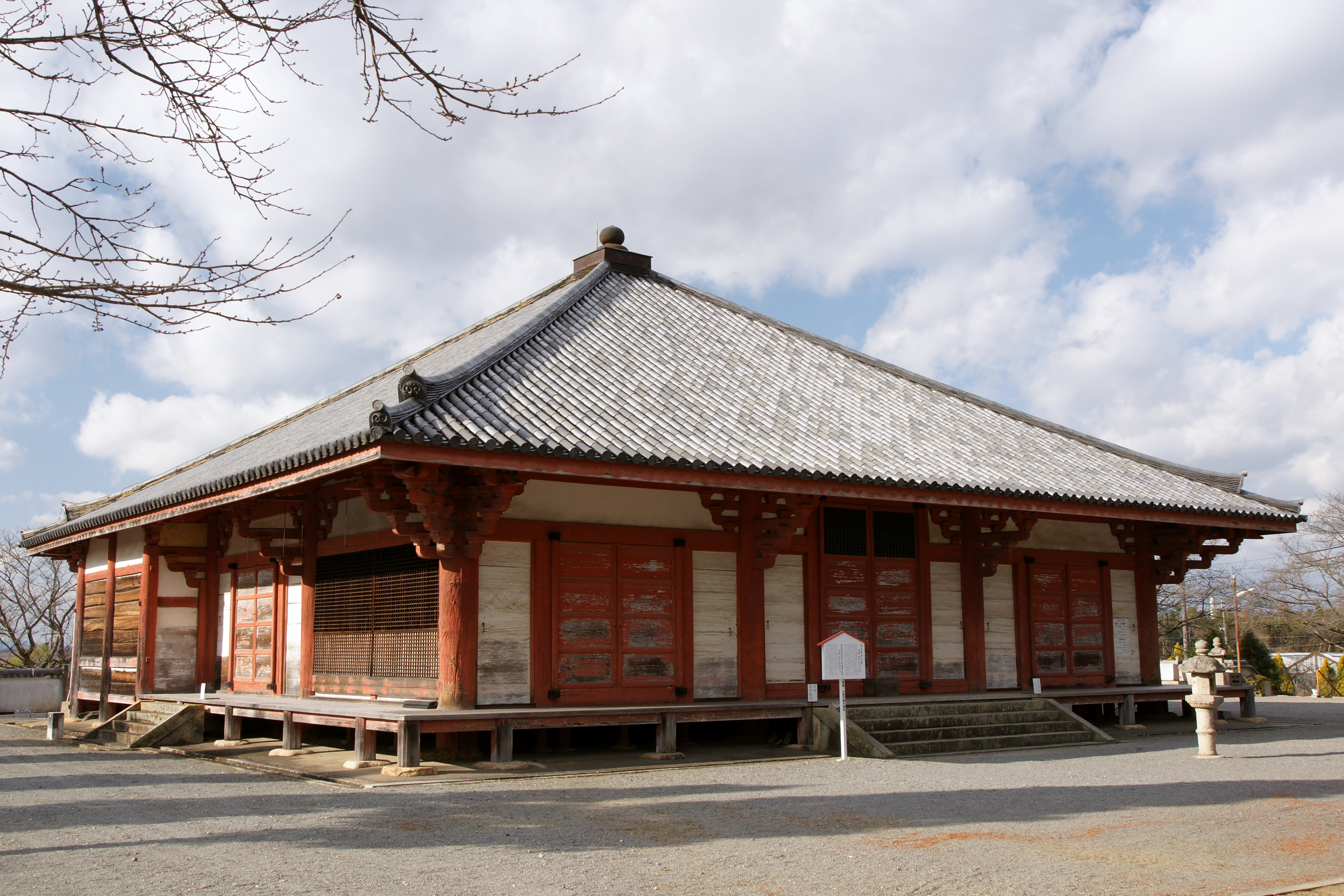
Jōdo-ji in Ono

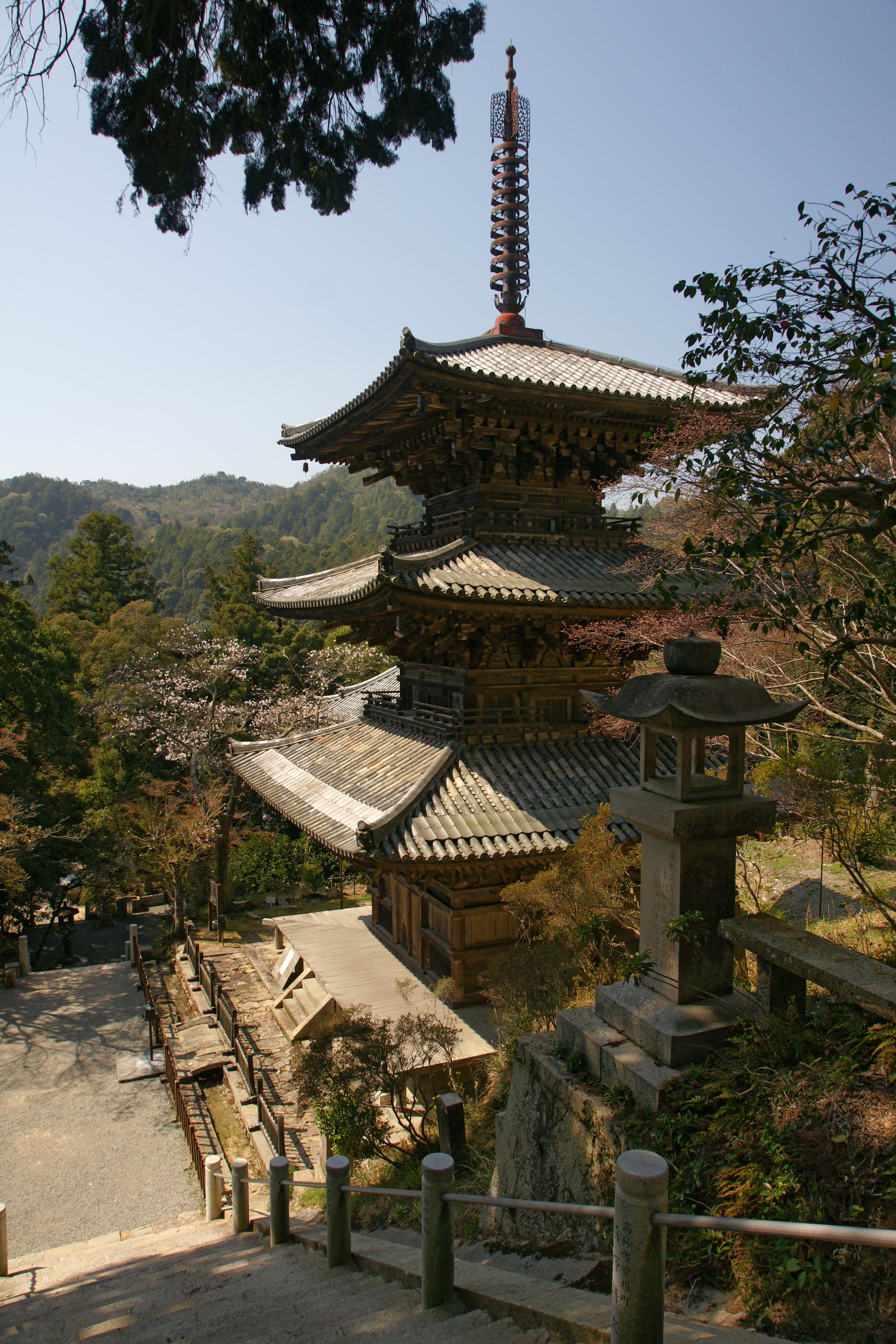
Ichijo-ji in Kasai

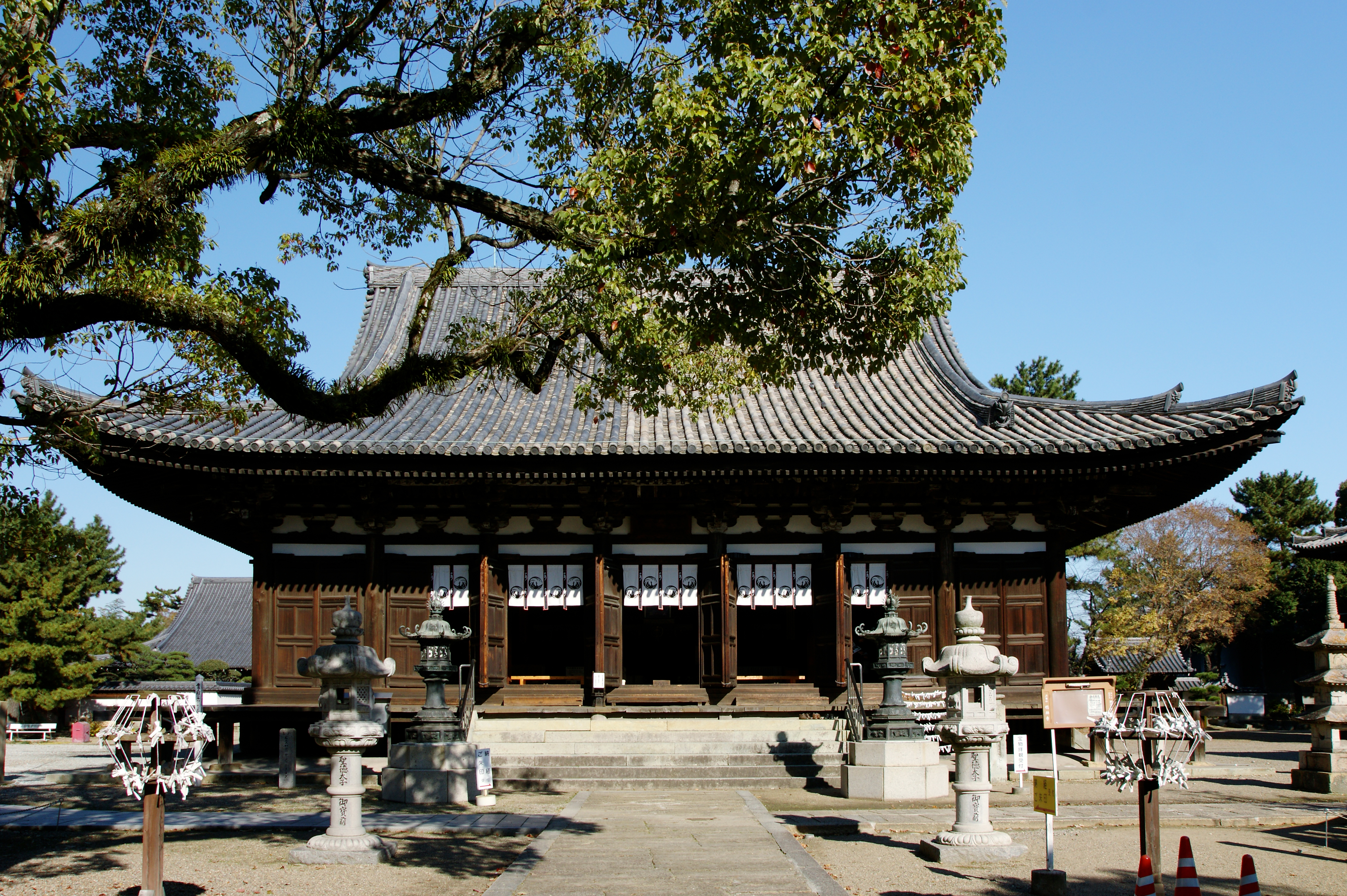
Kakurin-ji in Kakogawa

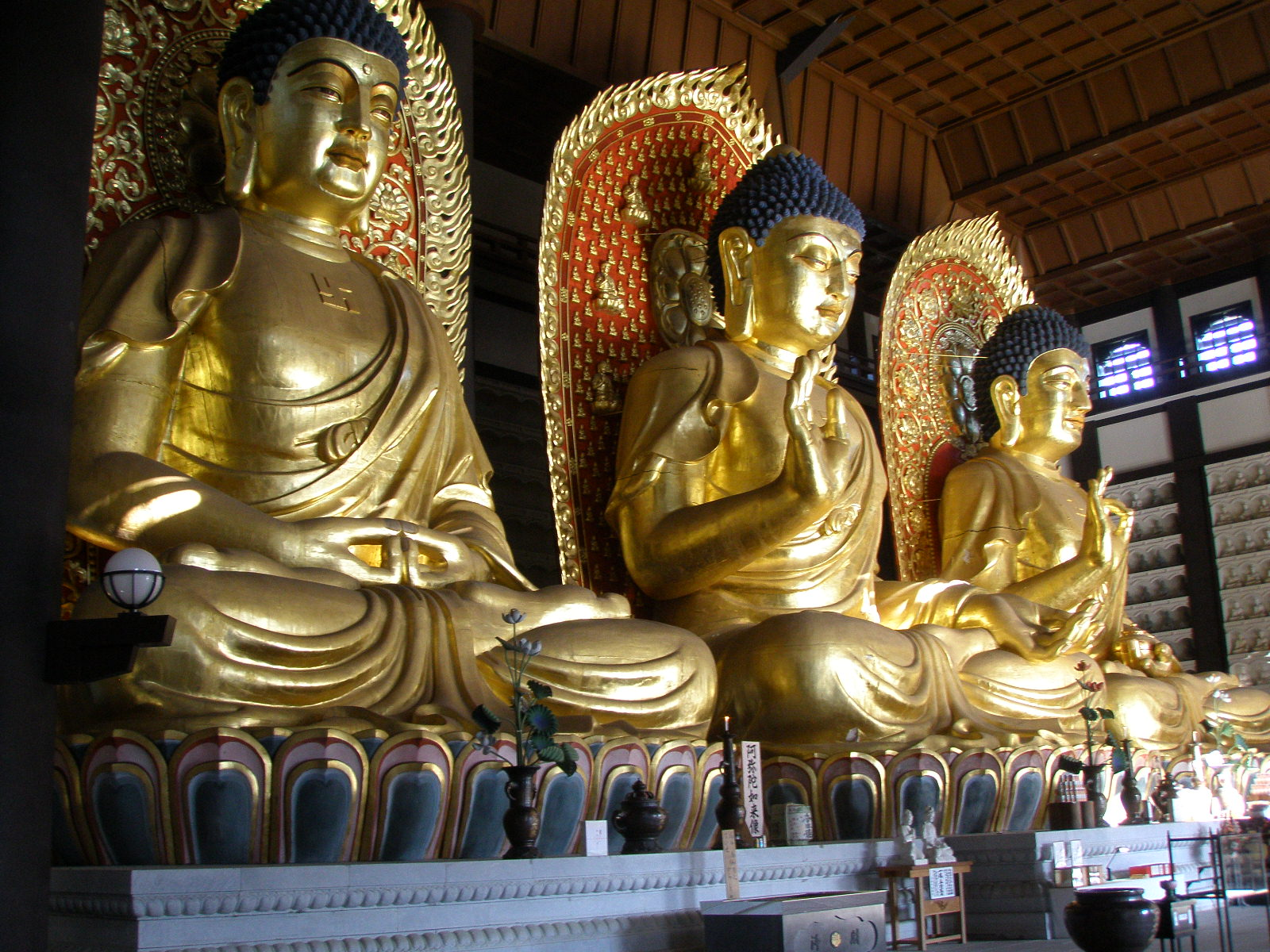
Chorakuji-daibutsu

=== Important Preservation Districts for Groups of Historic Buildings in Japan ===
- Izushi
- Kitano-chō Yamamoto-dōri
- Sasayama
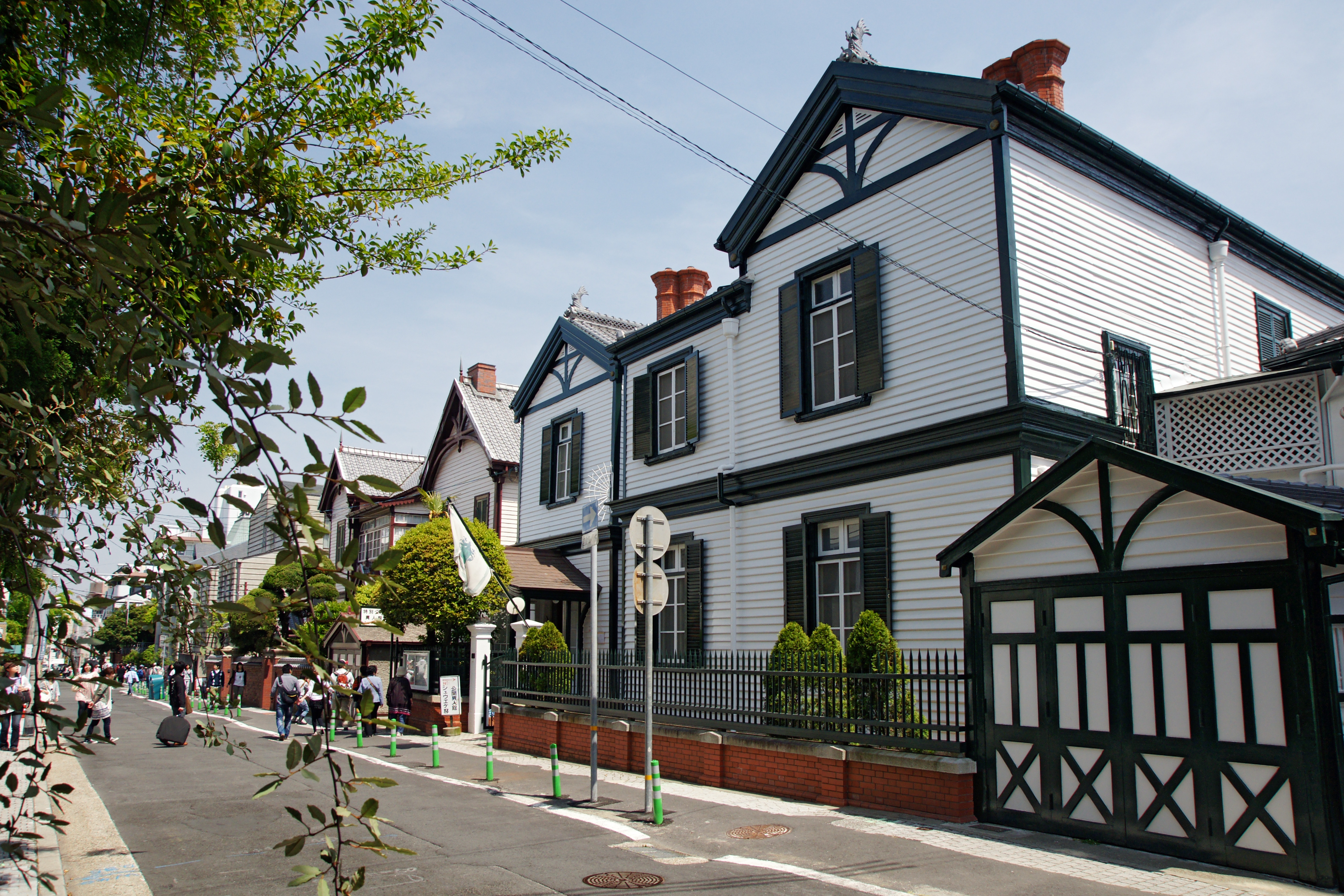
Kitano-chō Yamamoto-dōri

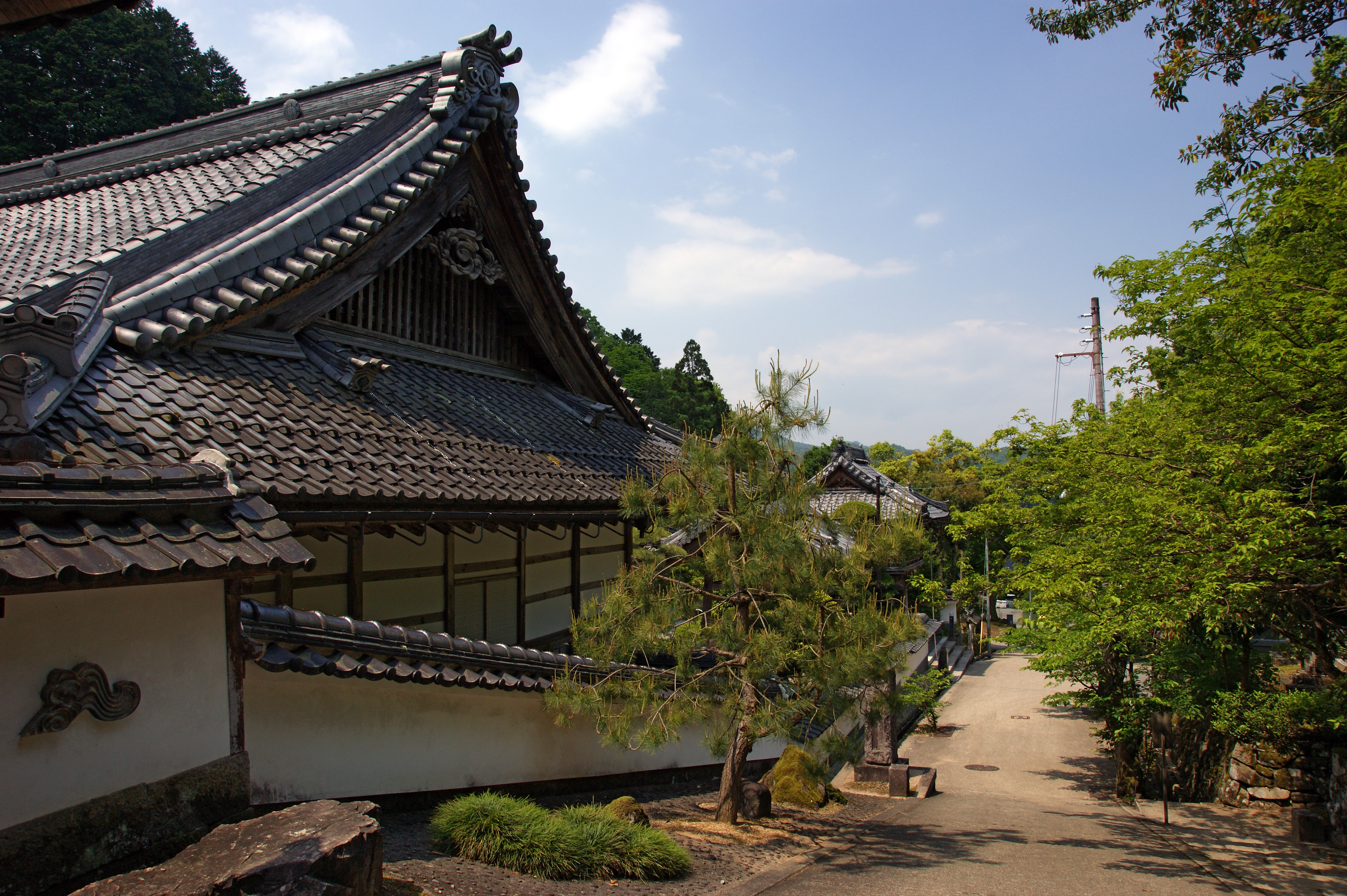
Izushi

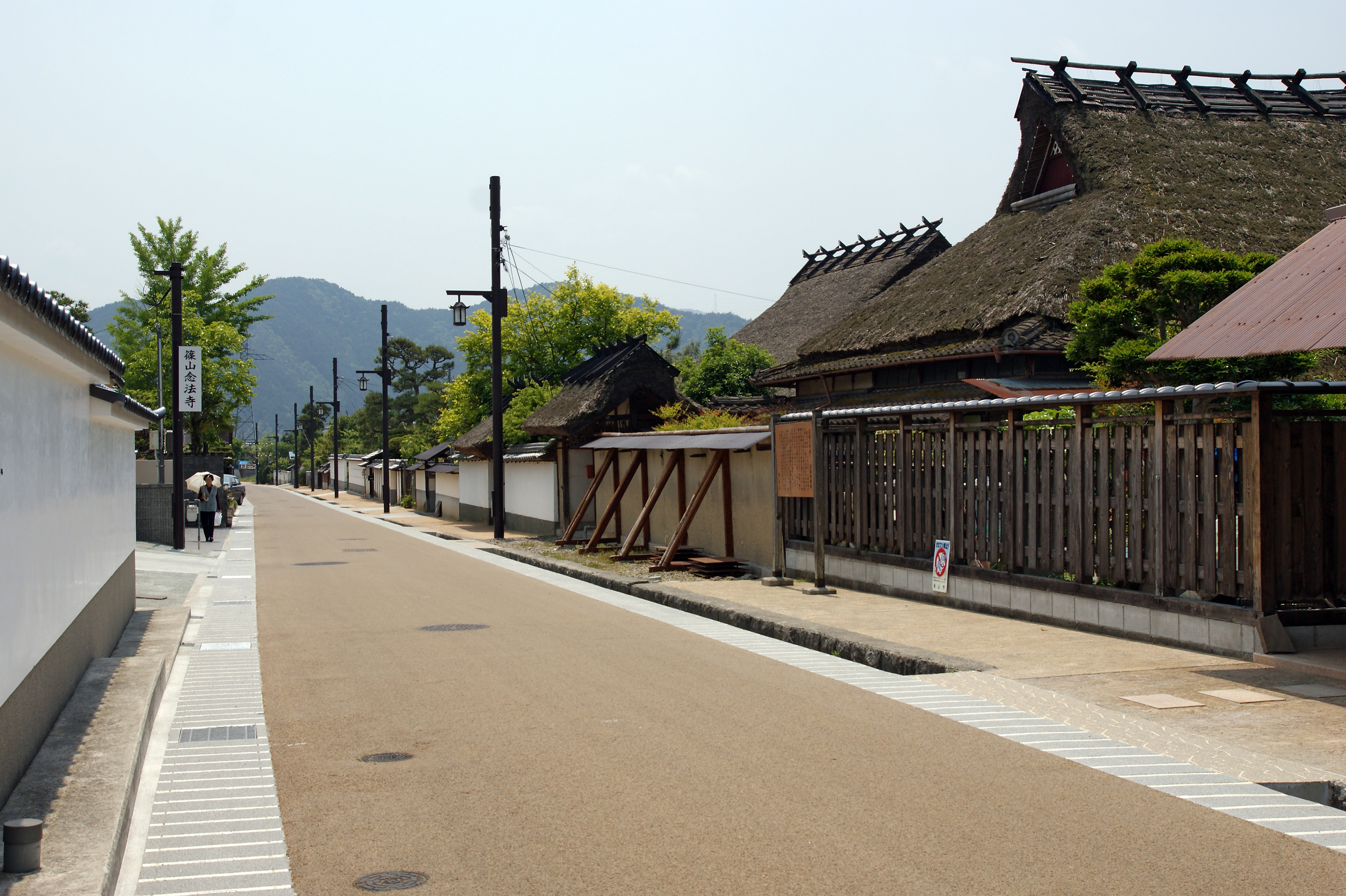
Sasayama

=== Museums ===
- Asago Art Village in Asago
- Ashiya City Museum of Art & History in Ashiya
- Hakutsuru Fine Art Museum in Higashinada Ward, Kobe
- Himeji City Museum of Art in Himeji
- Hyōgo Prefectural Museum of Art in Nada Ward, Kobe
- Kobe City Museum in Chuo Ward, Kobe
- Kobe Maritime Museum in Chuo Ward, Kobe
- Kosetsu Museum of Art in Higashinada Ward, Kobe
- Tekisui Museum of Art in Ashiya
- Osamu Tezuka Manga Museum in Takarazuka
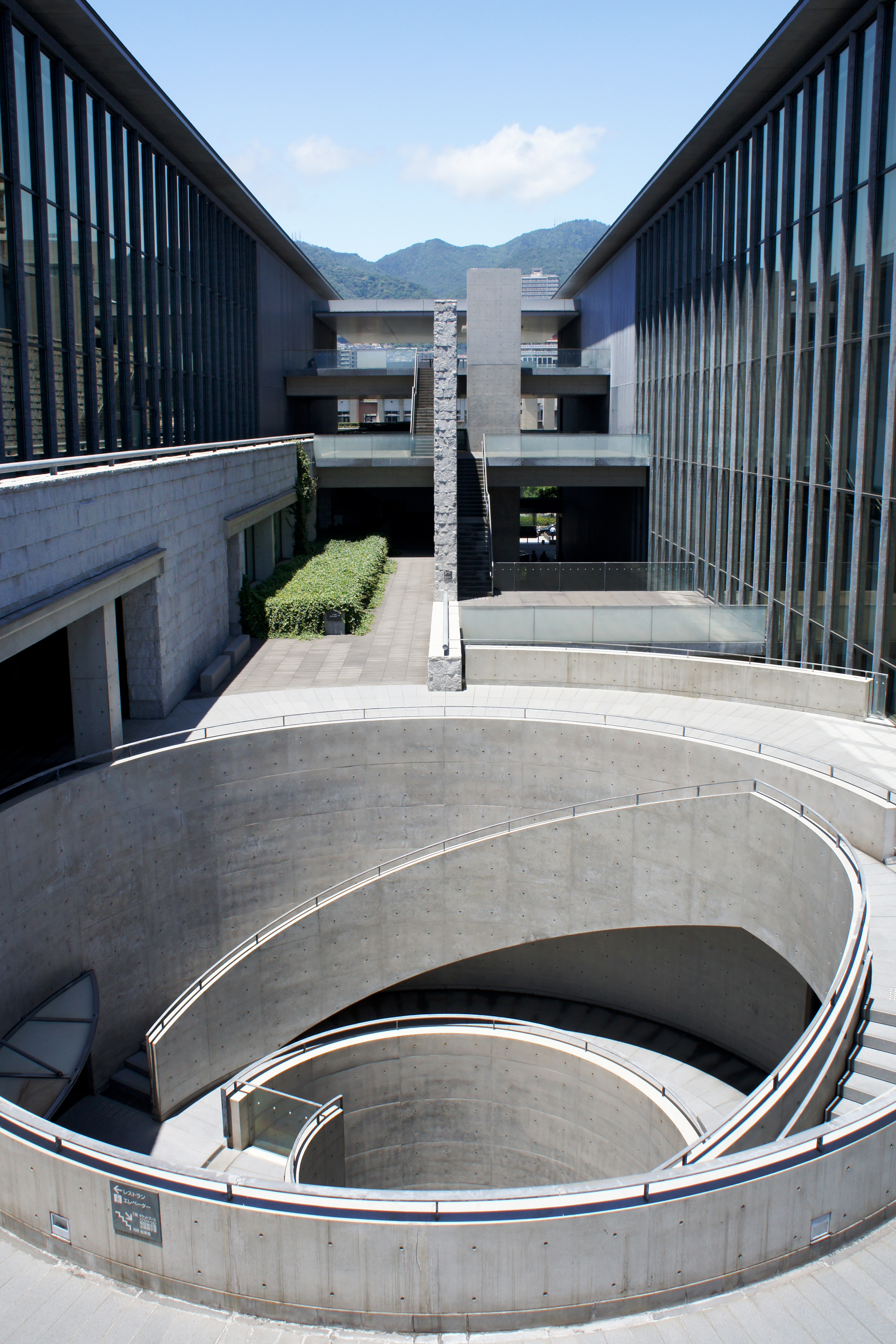
Hyōgo Prefectural Museum of Art in Kobe

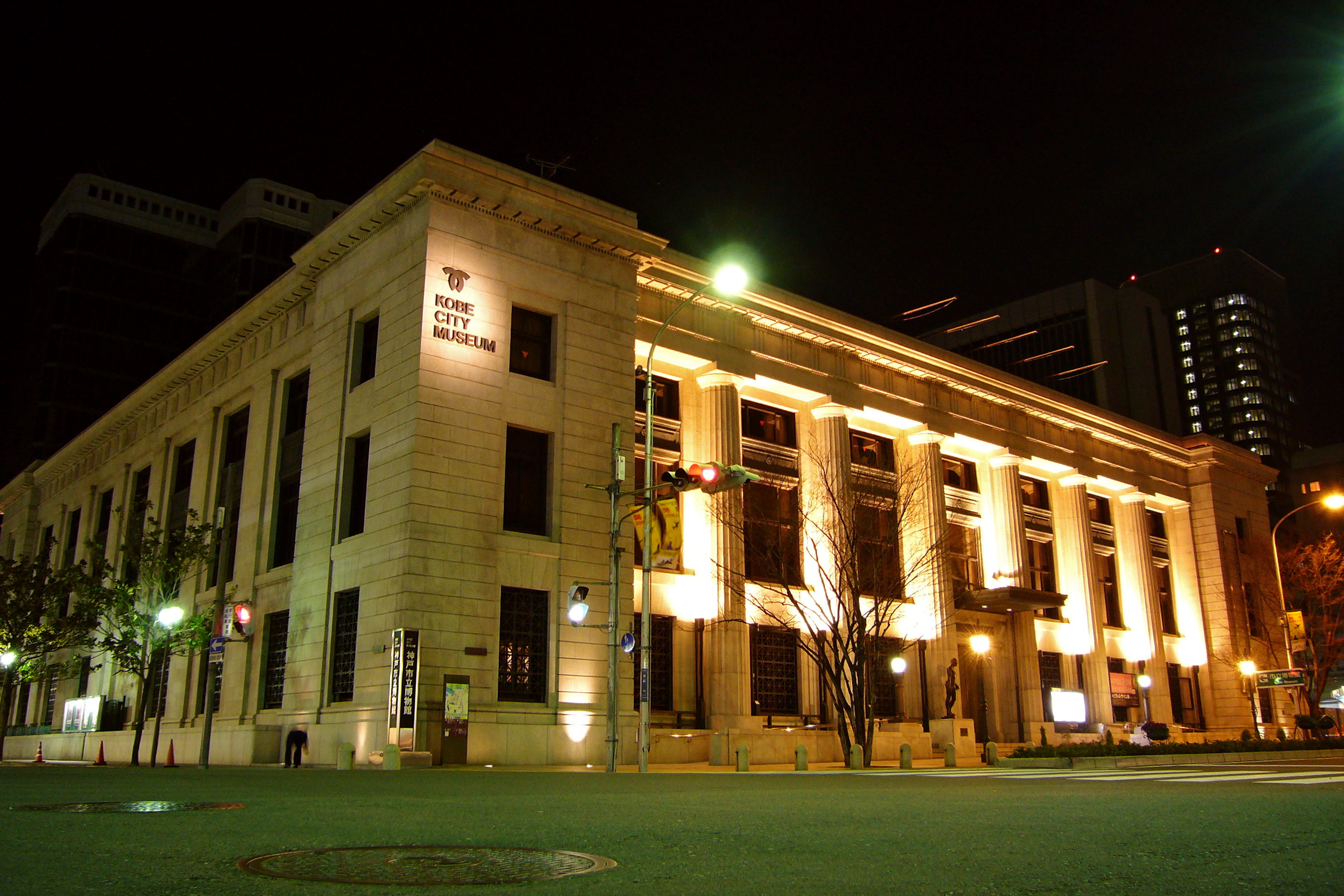
Kobe City Museum in Kobe

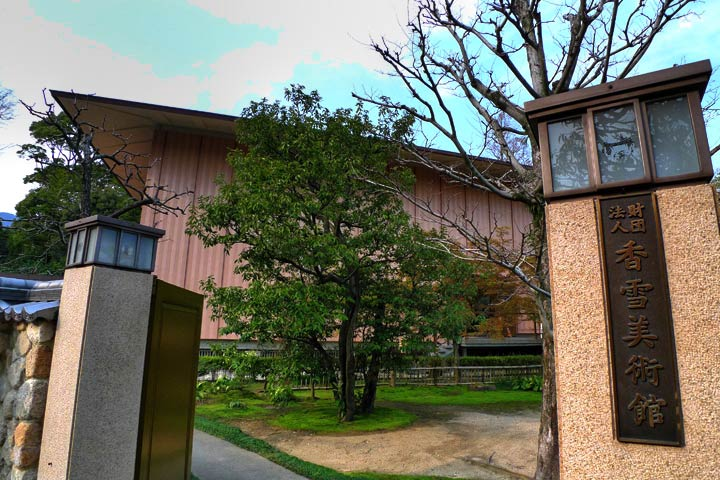
KOSETSU Museum of Art in Kobe

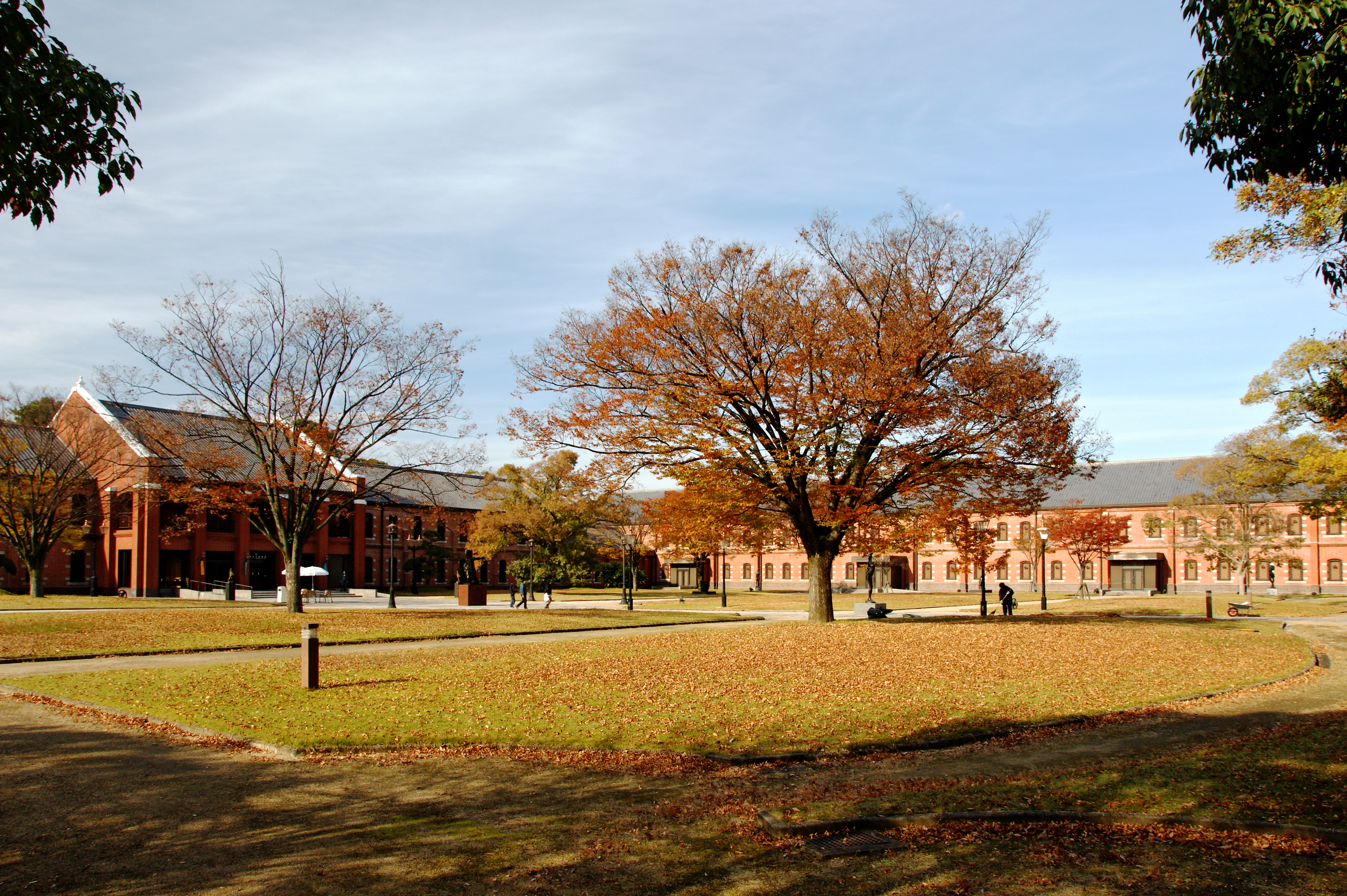
Himeji City Museum of Art in Himeji

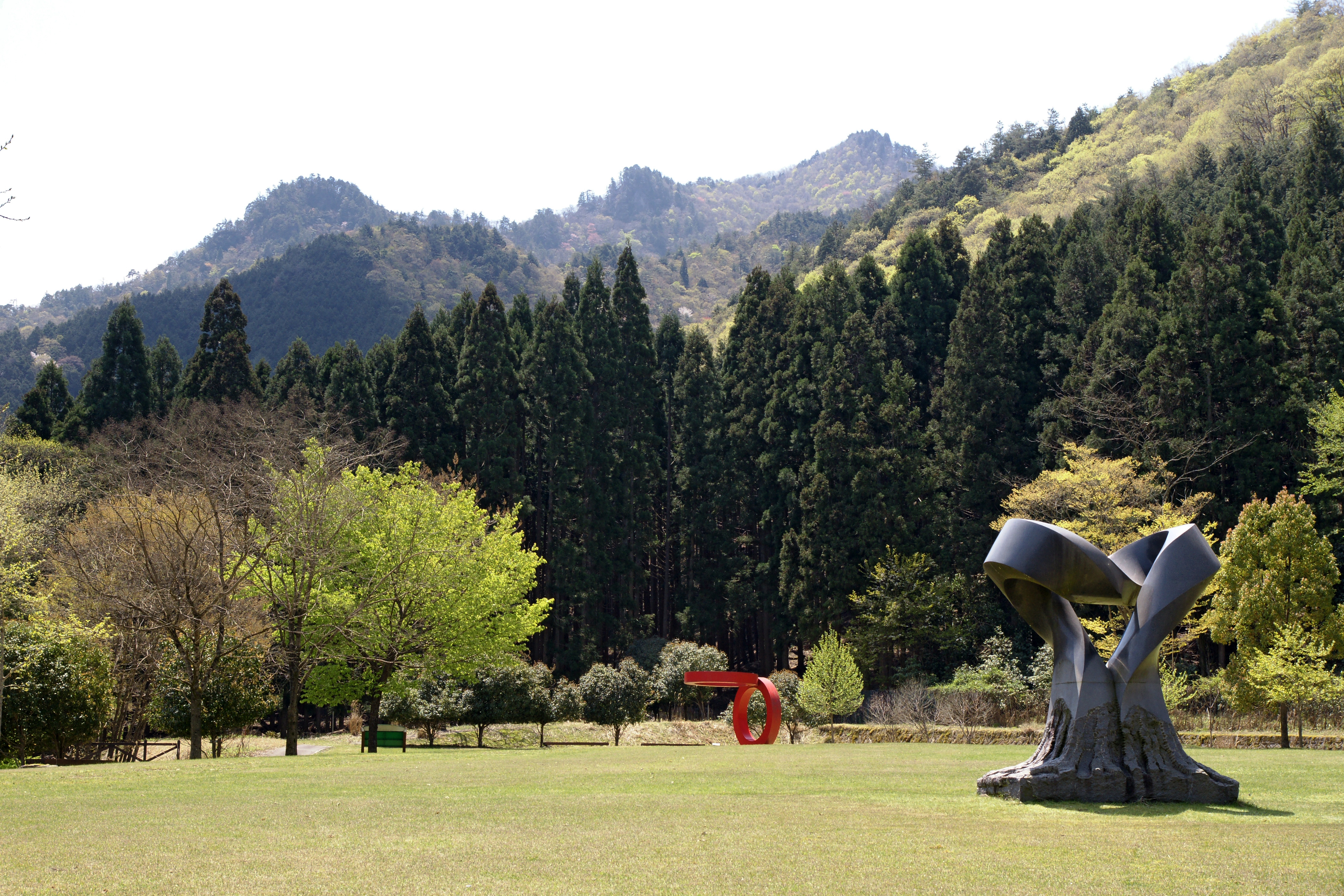
Asago Art Village in Asago

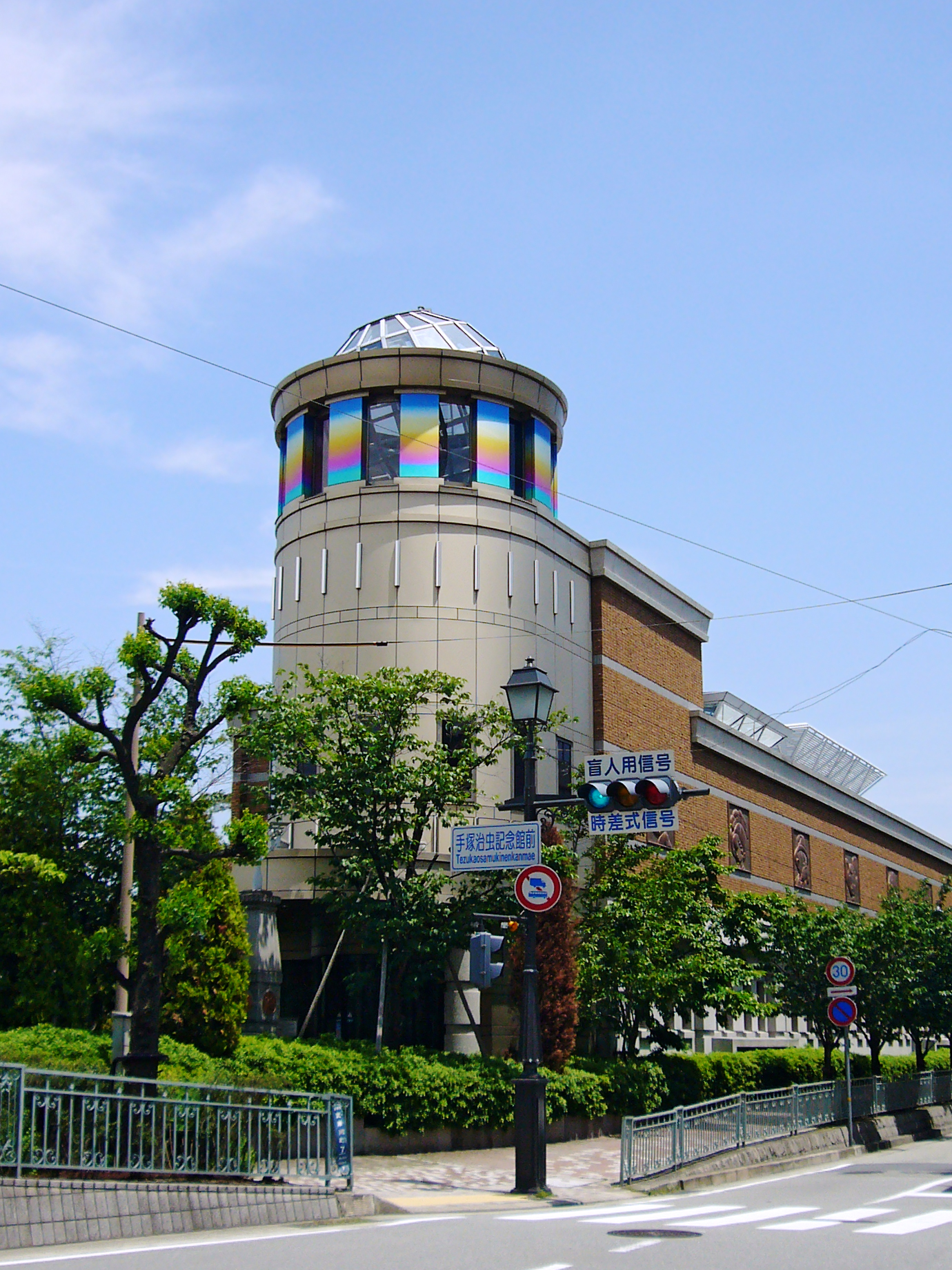
Osamu Tezuka Manga Museum in Takarazuka

== Education ==
=== Universities ===
==== Amagasaki ====
- Sonoda Women's University
- St. Thomas University (ex-Eichi University) – closed in 2015

==== Takarazuka ====
- Koshien University
- Takarazuka University

==== Sanda ====
- Kwansei Gakuin University (Sanda Campus)

==== Nishinomiya ====
- Kobe College
- Kwansei Gakuin University
- Mukogawa Women's University
- Otemae University

==== Ashiya ====
- Ashiya University

==== Kobe ====
- Kobe City University of Foreign Studies
- Kobe Institute of Computing
- Kobe Gakuin University
- Kobe Shukugawa Gakuin University
- Kobe University
- Kobe University of Commerce
- Kobe Women's University
- Konan University
- University of Hyogo
- University of Marketing and Distribution Sciences

==== Kato ====
- Hyogo University of Teacher Education

==== Akashi ====
- University of Hyogo

==== Kakogawa ====
- Hyogo University

==== Himeji ====
- Himeji Dokkyo University
- Himeji Institute of Technology
- Himeji Kinki University
- University of Hyogo

==== Akō ====
- University of Hyogo

=== High schools ===
There are 163 public and 52 private high schools within Hyogo prefecture. Of the public high schools, some are administered by the Hyogo prefectural government, whilst the others are administered by local municipalities.

- Ashiya International Secondary School, founded 2003

== Sports ==
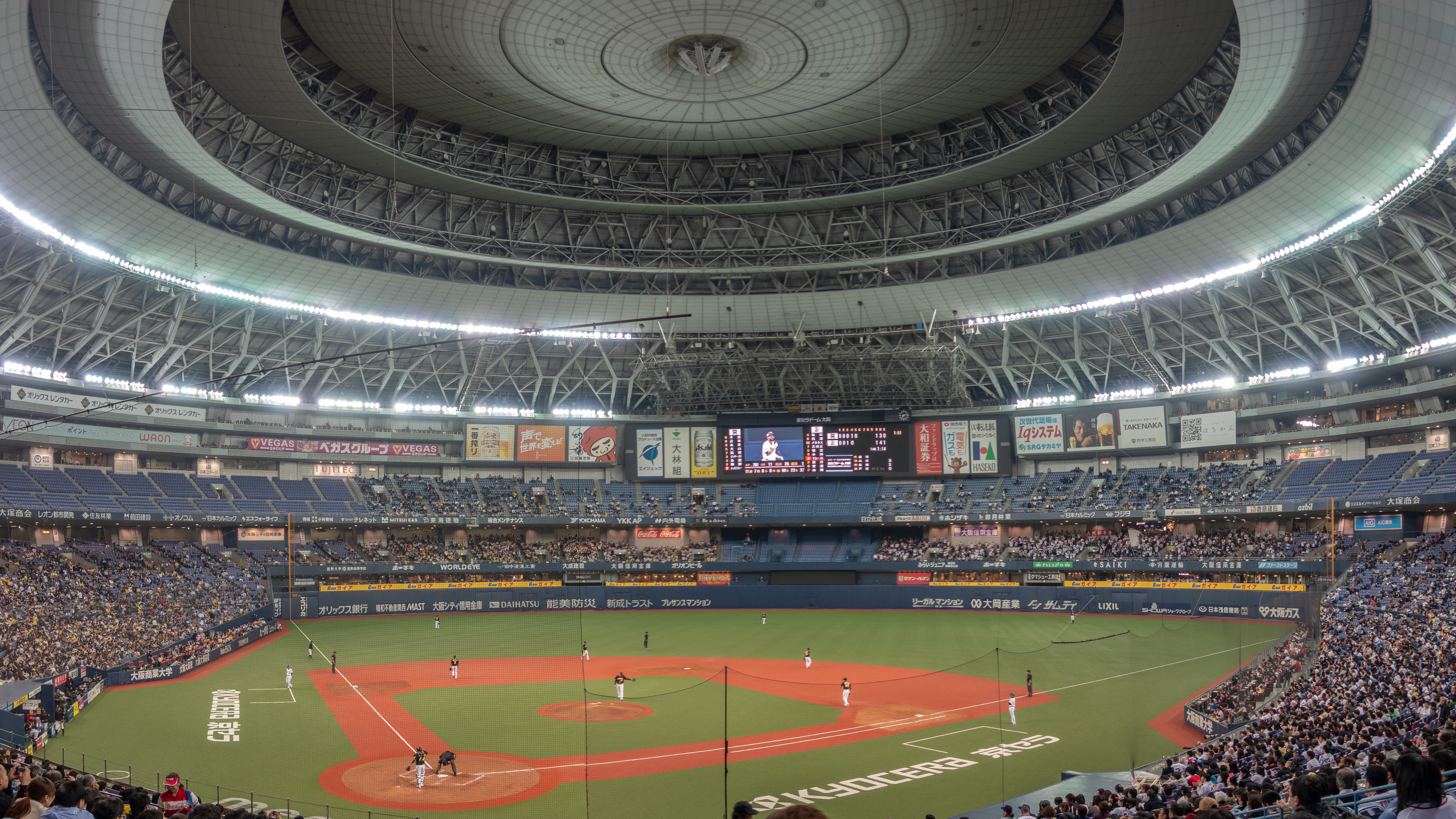
Kyocera Dome Osaka

The sports teams listed below are based in Hyōgo.

Baseball

- Hanshin Tigers (Nishinomiya)
- Orix Buffaloes (Kobe)

Basketball

- Kobe Storks (Kobe)

Football (soccer)

- INAC Kobe Leonessa (Women's) (Kobe)
- Vissel Kobe (Kobe)

Rugby

- Kobelco Steelers (Kobe)
- World Fighting Bull (Kobe)

Volleyball

- Hisamitsu Springs (Kobe)
- JT Marvelous (Nishinomiya)

== Tourism ==
A popular troupe of Takarazuka Revue plays in Takarazuka.

Arima Onsen in the south of the province in Kita-ku, Kobe is one of the Three Ancient Springs in Japan. The north of Hyogo Prefecture has sightseeing spots such as Kinosaki Onsen, Izushi, and Yumura Onsen. Takeda Castle in Asago is often referred to locally as the "Machu Picchu of Japan". The matsuba crab and Tajima beef are both national delicacies.

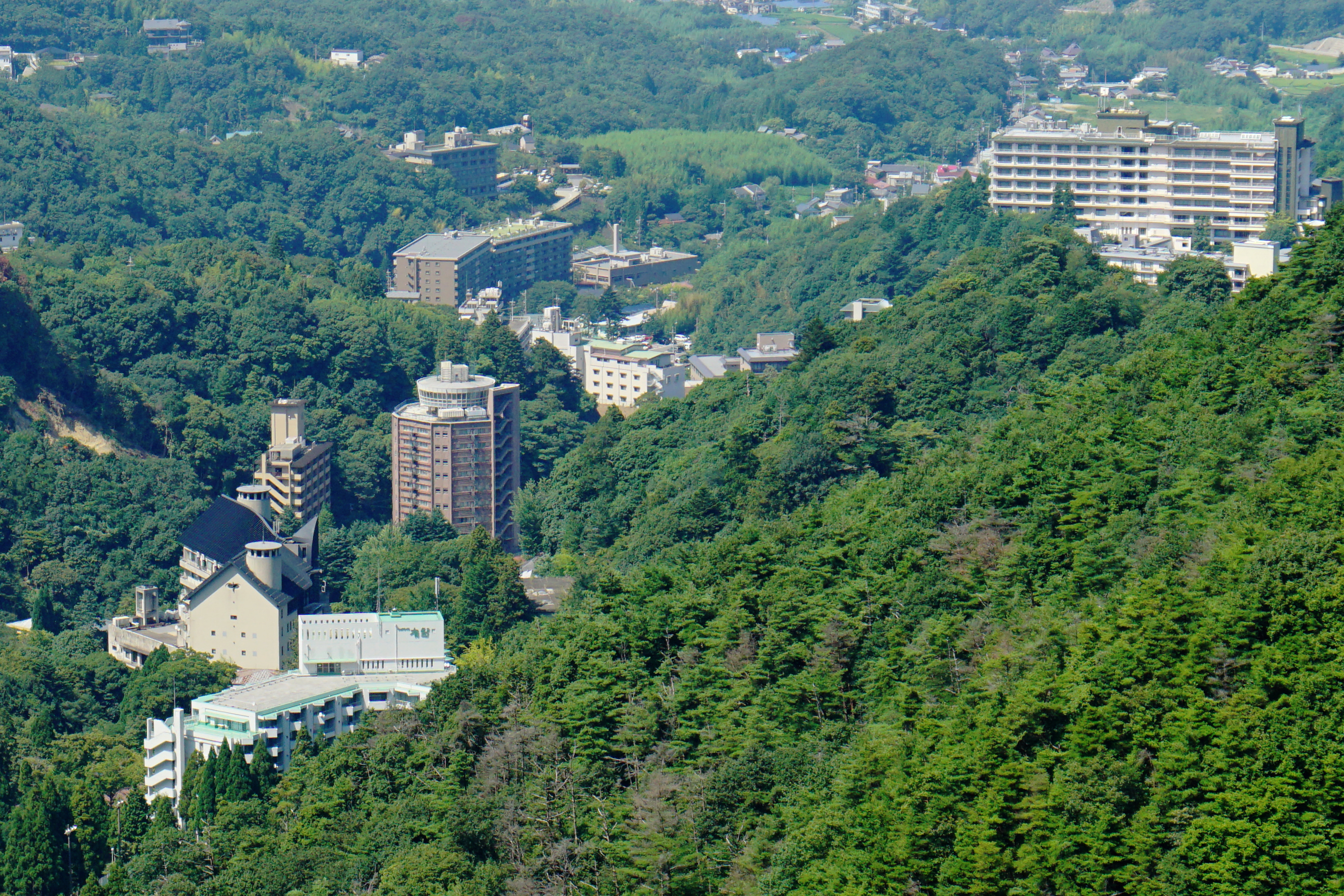
Arima Onsen, Kobe

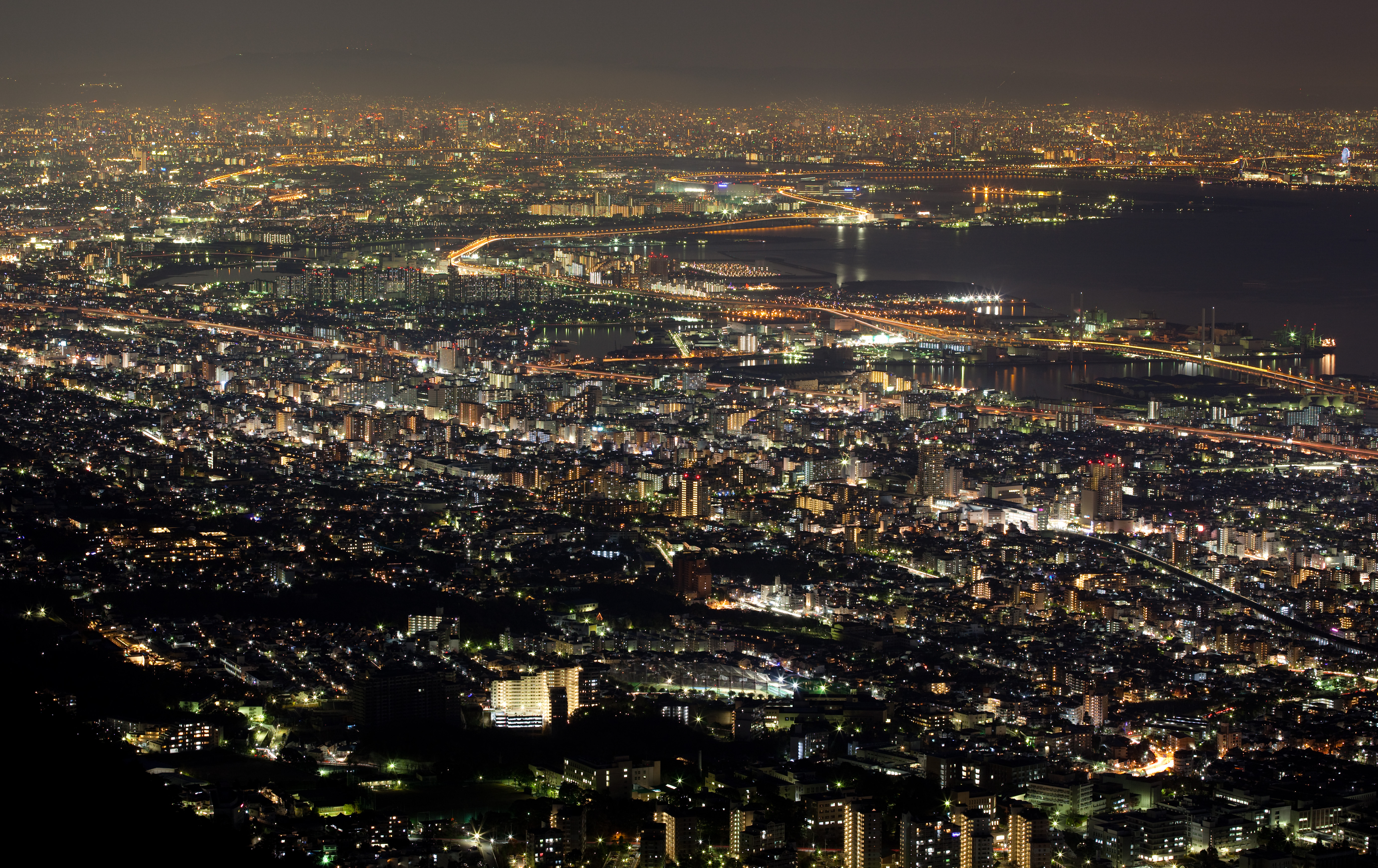
Million-dollar view, Kobe

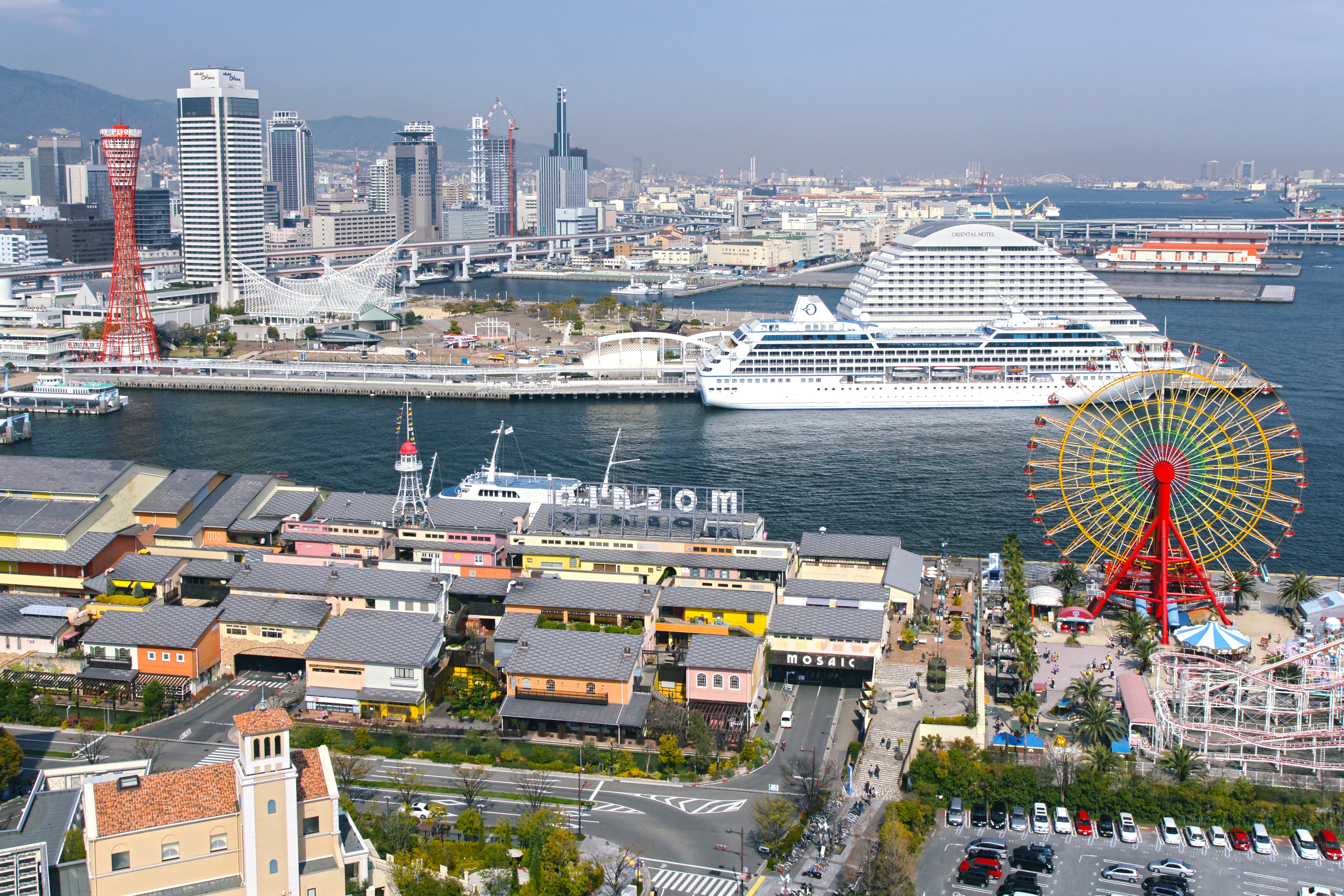
Harborland – Meriken Park area in Kobe

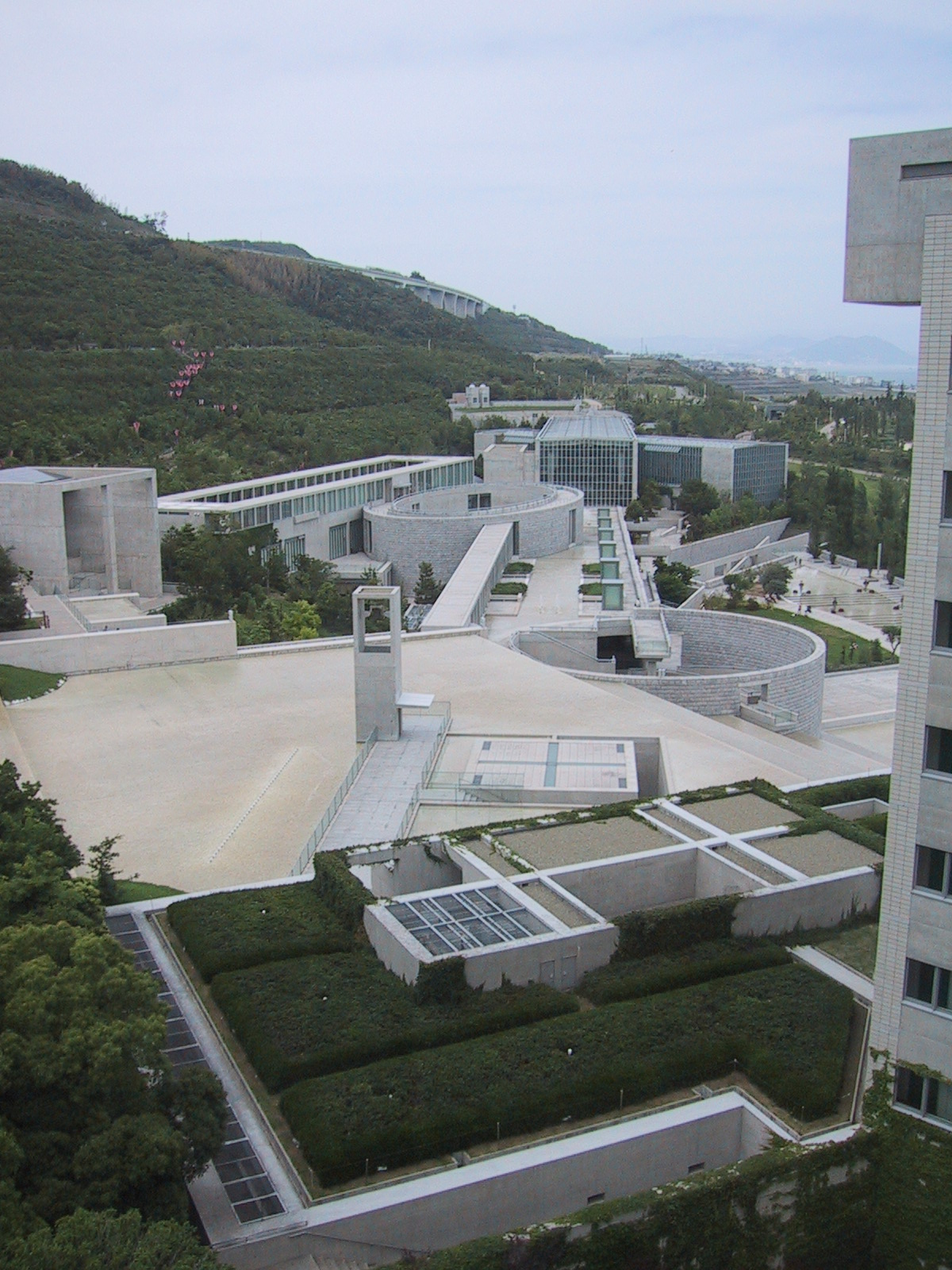
Awaji Yumebutai in Awaji

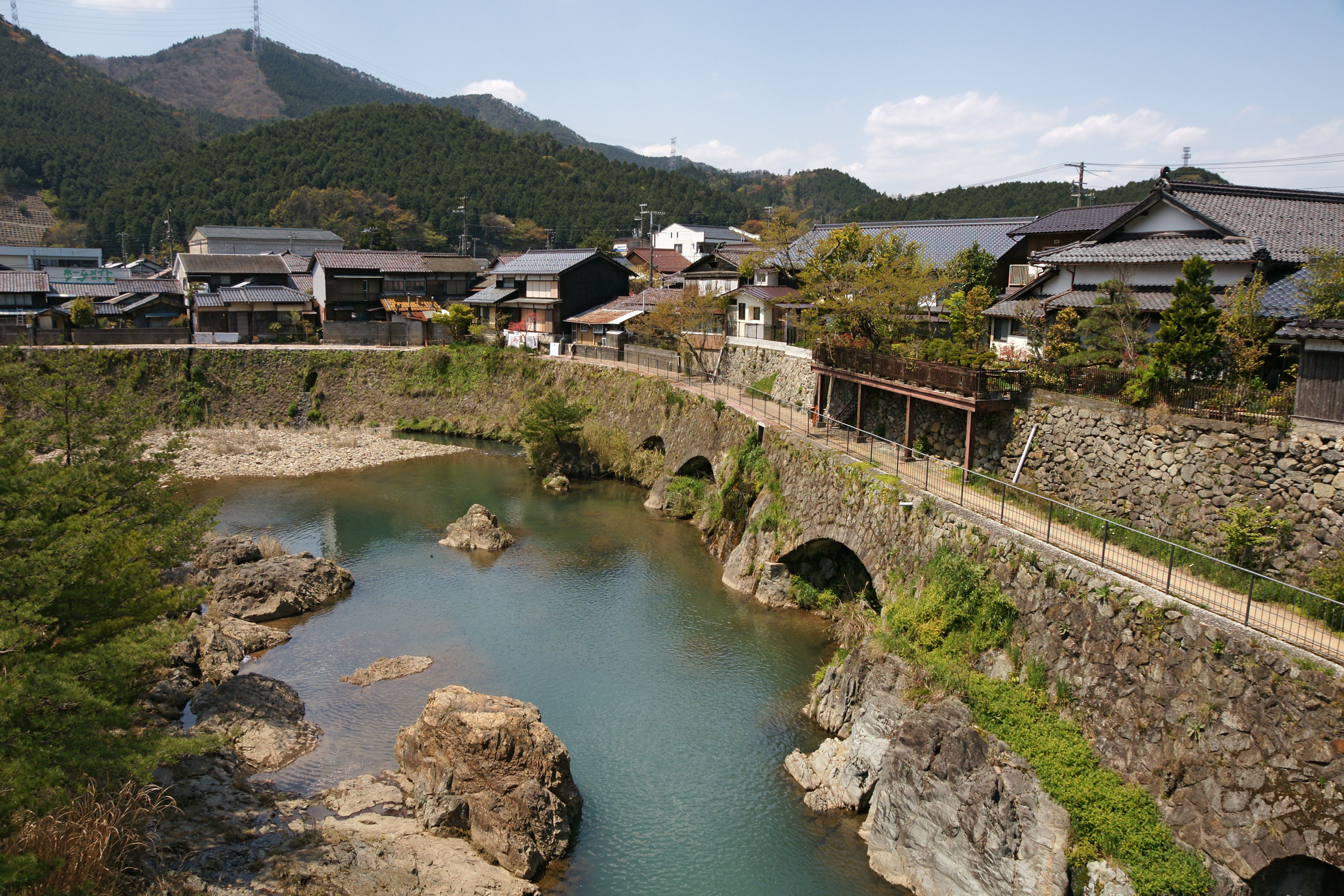
Kuchiganaya in Asago

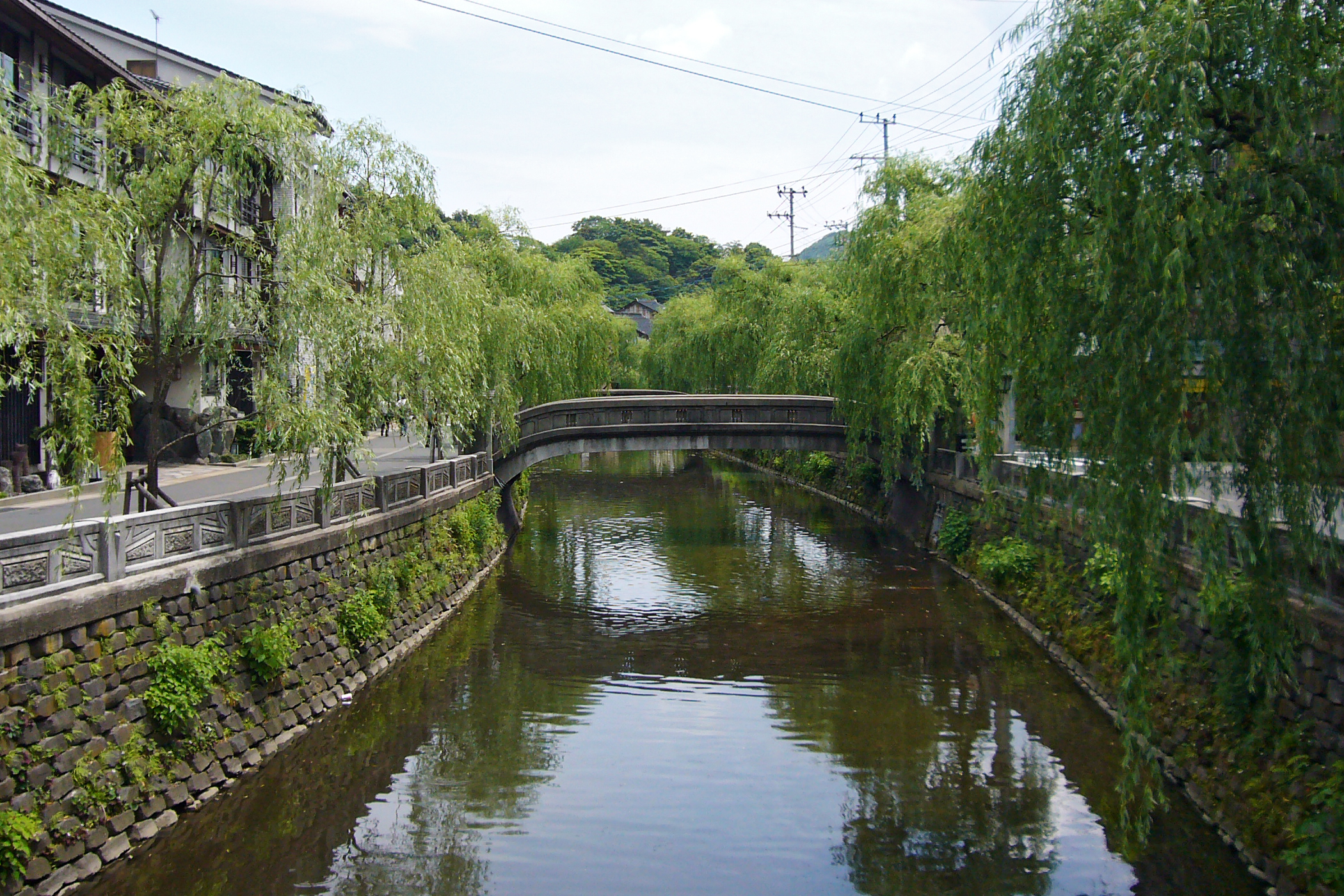
Kinosaki Onsen

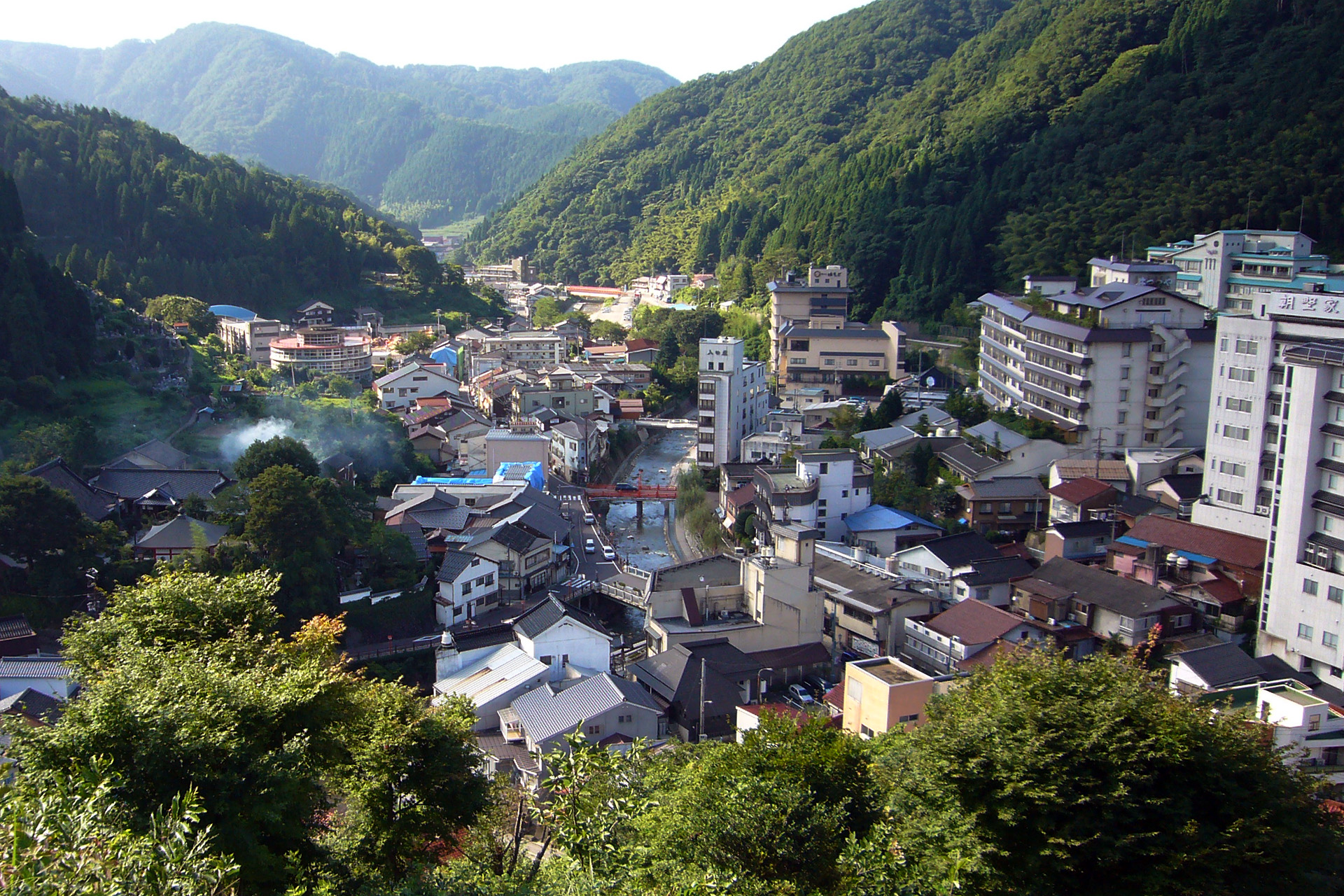
Yumura Onsen

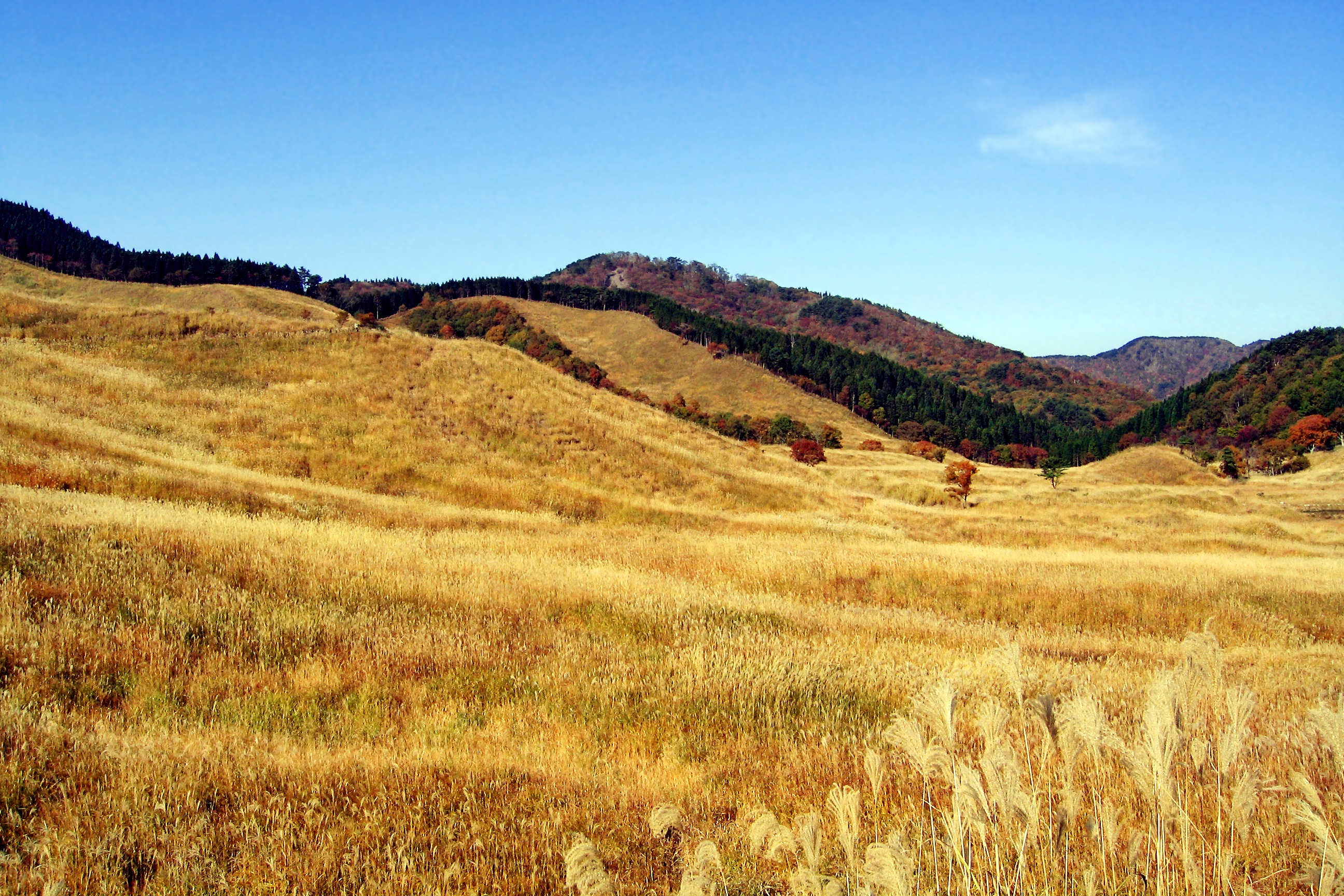
Tonomine highland in Kamikawa

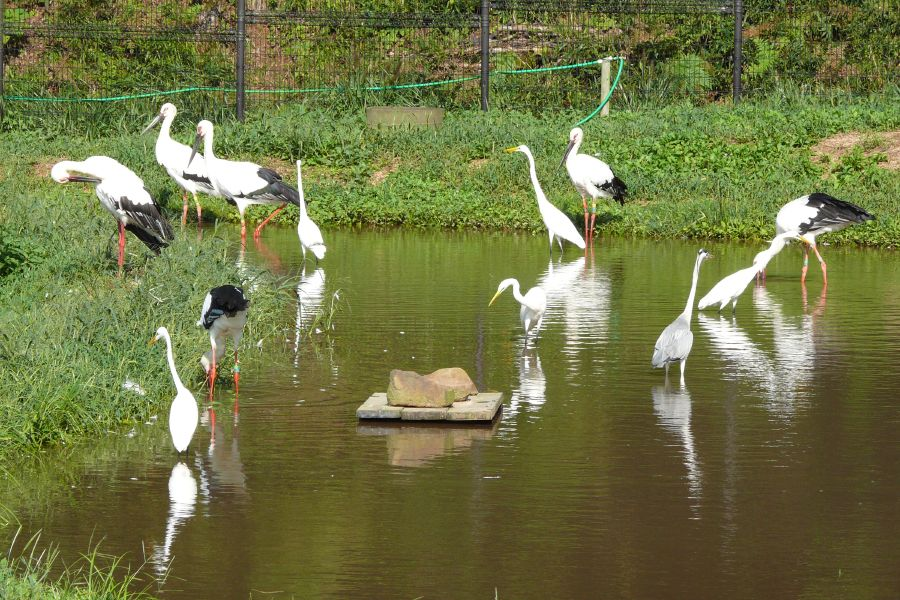
Toyooka Stork Park

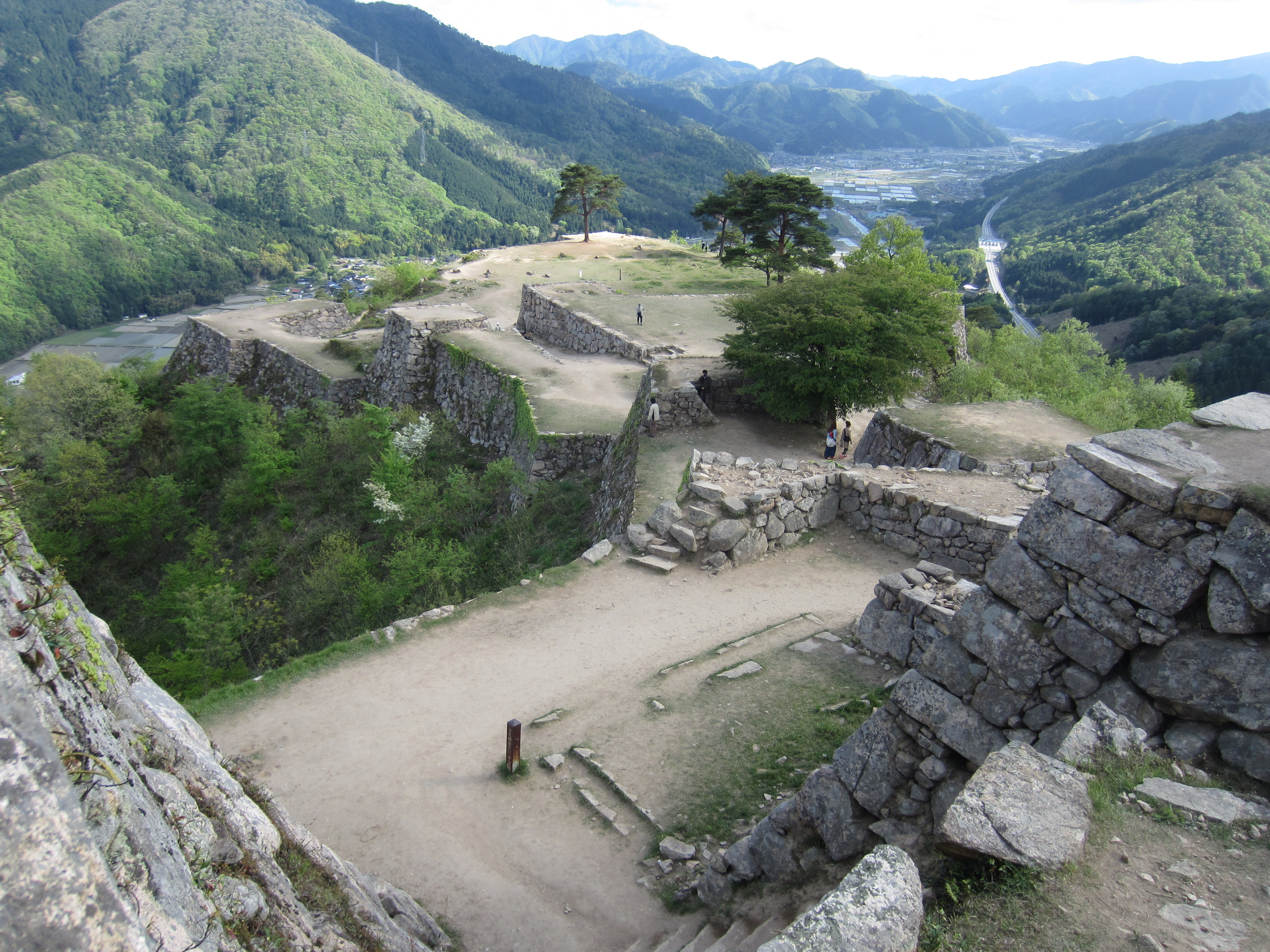
Takeda Castle

== Festivals and events ==
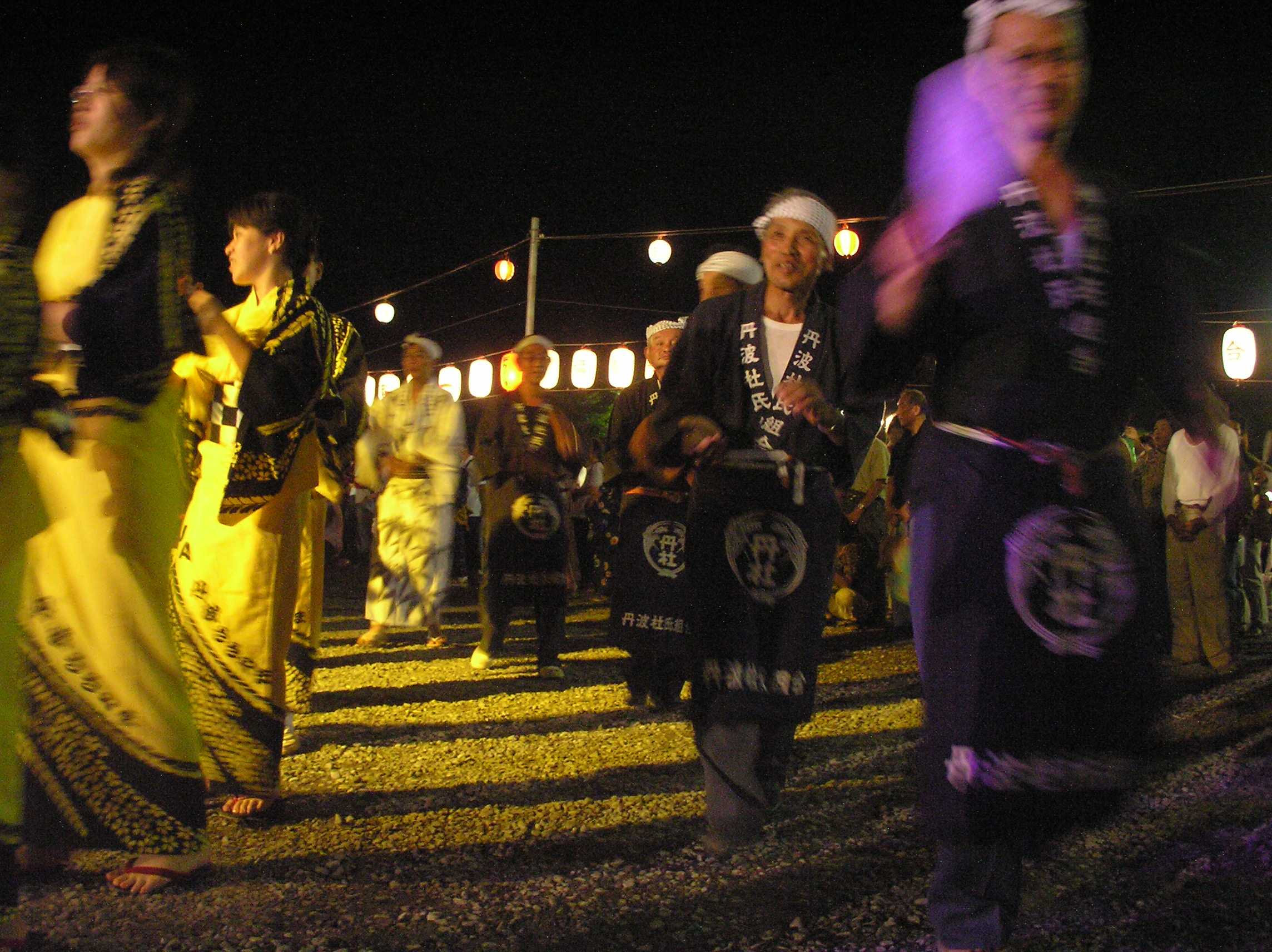
Dekansho Bon Dancing Festival

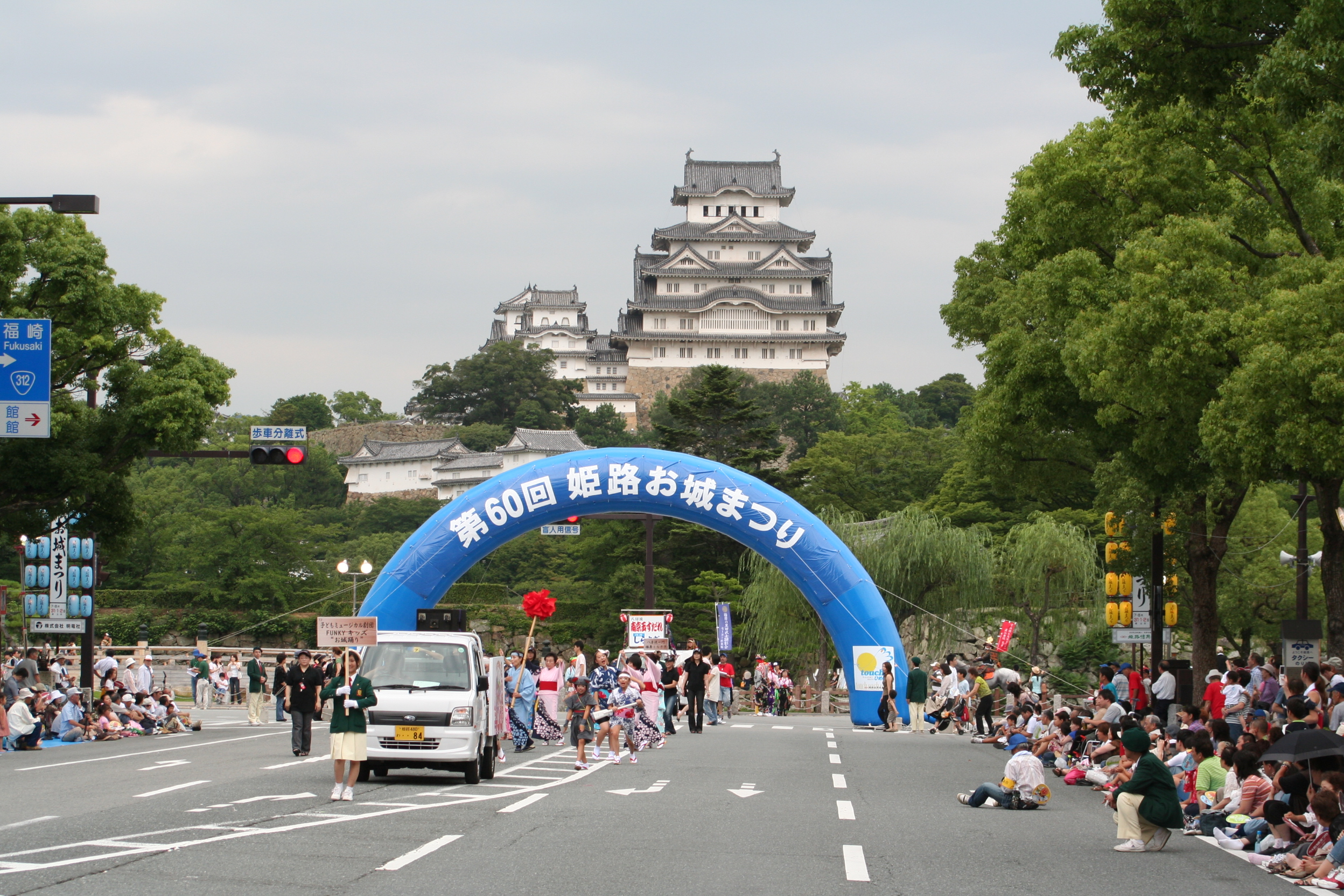
Castle Festival in Himeji

- Miyuki Street New Year's midnight traditional sale, Himeji
- Nishinomiya Shrine's Ebisu Festival in January
- Yanagihara Ebisu Festival in January, Kobe
- Tada Shrine's Genji Festival in April, Kawanishi
- Kobe Festival and Parade in May
- Aioi Peron Festival in May
- Himeji Yukata Festival in June
- Dekansho Bon Dancing Festival in August, Sasayama
- Nada Fighting Festival, Himeji
- Kobe Luminarie in December
- Ako Chushingura Parade

== Transportation ==
=== Rail ===
- JR West
  - San'yō Shinkansen
  - JR Kobe Line
  - Wadamisaki Line
  - San'yō Main Line
  - San'in Line
  - Fukuchiyama Line (JR Takarazuka Line)
  - Kakogawa Line
  - Bantan Line
  - Kishin Line
  - Akō Line
- Hankyu Railway
  - Kobe Line
  - Kobe Kosoku Line
  - Itami Line
  - Imazu Line
  - Koyo Line
  - Takarazuka Line
- Nose Railway
  - Myoken Line
  - Nissei Line
- Shintetsu
  - Arima Line
  - Kobe Kosoku Line
  - Sanda Line
  - Kōen-Toshi Line
  - Ao Line
- Kobe Municipal Subway
  - Seishin-Yamate Line
  - Kaigan Line
  - Hokushin Line
- Hojo Railway (Ao-Hojo)
- Hanshin Railway
  - Main Line
  - Kobe Kosoku Line
  - Mukogawa Line
  - Hanshin Namba Line
- Sanyo Railway
  - Main Line
  - Aboshi Line
- Chizu Express
- Kitakinki Tango Railway
  - Miyazu Line

=== People movers ===
- Kobe New Transit
  - Port Liner
  - Rokkō Liner

=== Road ===
==== Expressways ====
- Bantan Expressway
- Chūgoku Expressway
- Hanshin Expressway
- Kobe-Awaji-Naruto Expressway
- Maizuru-Wakasa Expressway
- Meishin Expressway
- San'yō Expressway
- Second Shinmei road

==== National highways ====
- Route 2
- Route 9
- Route 28
- Route 29
- Route 43
- Route 171
- Route 173
- Route 174 (Sannomiya-Kobe Port)
- Route 175
- Route 176
- Route 178
- Route 179
- Route 250
- Route 312
- Route 372
- Route 373
- Route 426
- Route 427
- Route 428
- Route 429
- Route 436
- Route 477
- Route 482
- Route 483

=== Ports ===
- Akashi Port
- Kobe Port – Mainly international container hub port
- Shikama Port – Mainly Shōdo Island route ferry

=== Airport ===
- Kobe Airport
- Konotori Tajima Airport

Kansai International Airport in nearby Osaka Prefecture is also used by air travellers from the prefecture as it provides most domestic and international travel.

== Notable people ==
- Ume Aoki, manga artist
- Mana Ashida, child actress from Nishinomiya
- Koichi Domoto, singer of KinKi Kids
- Heath, musician, singer-songwriter and bassist of X Japan is from Amagasaki.
- Hiro Fujiwara, manga artist
- Miracle Hikaru, comedian and impersonator is from Toyooka.
- Kanō Jigorō, founder of the martial art judo
- Jun, musician, singer-songwriter and guitarist of Phantasmagoria is from Kobe.
- Shinji Kagawa, footballer from Kobe
- Tomoya Kanki, drummer of One Ok Rock
- Takumi Kawanishi (J-pop idol singer and dancer, member of JO1)
- Tomomi Ogawa, bassist of Scandal
- Itzuki Yamazaki, professional wrestler from Ieshima
- Kaoru, guitarist of Dir En Grey
- Ayaka Kimura, actress, former singer of Coconuts Musume is from Kobe.
- Keiko Kitagawa, actress from Pretty Guardian Sailor Moon and Buzzer Beat was born in Kobe.
- Miho Komatsu, singer and songwriter from Kobe
- Yūji Kuroiwa, politician from Kobe, current governor of Kanagawa Prefecture
- Kamui Kobayashi, former Sauber and Toyota Racing driver from Amagasaki
- Chisa Maekawa, singer of Girl Next Door
- Kiyomatsu Matsubara, ichthyologist, herpetologist and marine biologist
- Hitoshi Matsumoto, comedian, from Amagasaki
- Aya Matsuura, singer is from Himeji.
- Ryuto Kazuhara, vocalist of Generations from Exile Tribe is from Amagasaki.
- Mina Myoui – American-born Japanese singer of South Korean group Twice. Raised in Nishinomiya
- Hiro Matsushita – Businessman, former driver in Champ Car series. Chairman of Swift Engineering & Swift Xi
- Miyavi, musician, although born in Konohana-ku, Osaka grew up in Kawanishi
- Minako Nishiyama, contemporary artist
- Rena Nōnen known professionally as Non (のん, Non), actress, singer, fashion model from Kamikawa
- Kaori Sakamoto, Figure Skater
- Masamune Shirow, manga artist was born in Kobe.
- Yoko Shimomura, video game composer
- So Taguchi, outfielder for the Chicago Cubs
- Masahiro Tanaka, pitcher for the New York Yankees
- Nagaru Tanigawa, creator of the Haruhi Suzumiya series was born in Kinki.
- Tsuneko Taniuchi, contemporary performance artist
- Fumito Ueda, video game creator of Ico, Shadow of the Colossus, and The Last Guardian
- Juri Ueno, Japanese Academy Award-winning actress best known for her performances in Swing Girls and the live-action adaptation of Nodame Cantabile, is from Kakogawa.
- Shota Yasuda, guitarist of Kanjani Eight is from Amagasaki.
- Ryo Utsunomiya, wildlife photographer
- Piko, musician, Vocaloid singer born in Kobe, Hyōgo

== Sister regions ==
Hyogo entered a sister state relationship with Washington state in the United States on October 22, 1963, the first such arrangement between Japan and the United States.

In 1981, a sister state agreement was drawn up between Hyogo and the state of Western Australia in Australia. To commemorate the 10th anniversary of this agreement in 1992, the Hyogo Prefectural Government Cultural Centre was established in Perth.

== See also ==
- Banshu Yamasaki Iris Garden
- K Computer

== General references ==
- Nussbaum, Louis-Frédéric and Käthe Roth (2005). Japan Encyclopedia. Cambridge, Mass.: Harvard University Press. ISBN 978-0-674-01753-5. OCLC 58053128.
