= Nemesis (disambiguation) =

Nemesis is a Greek mythological spirit of divine retribution against those who succumb to hubris.

Nemesis may also refer to:

== Outer space ==
- Nemesis (hypothetical star), a proposed dwarf star or brown dwarf in Sun's extreme outer orbit
- 128 Nemesis, an asteroid of the main belt

== Art, entertainment, and media ==
=== Fictional entities ===
==== Characters ====
- Holocaust (Marvel Comics), comic book character also known as Nemesis
- Nemesis (Alpha Flight), comic book characters affiliated with Alpha Flight
- Nemesis (DC Comics), comic book character
- Nemesis (Resident Evil), a.k.a. the Pursuer, a fictional character in Resident Evil universe
- Nemesis (Ultraverse), a Malibu Comics and Marvel Comics character
- Nemesis, a recurring character in the television series Hercules: The Legendary Journeys
- Nemesis, the leader of the Terrakors in the cartoon Robotix
- Nemesis, a character in the cartoon The Smurfs
- Nemesis, a god and the main antagonist from the game Black & White
- Nemesis, an arch-enemy in Catacomb Fantasy Trilogy
- Nemesis, a monster in the 2008 home video game Dark Sector by Digital Extremes
- Nemesis, a character in Adventures into the Unknown stories
- Nemesis, comic book character in Wildcats
- Nemesis, a character created by Jeremy Robinson
- Nemesis, one of the main antagonists from the video game Fire Emblem: Three Houses
- Nemesis, one of the main antagonists from the video game Yandere Simulator
- Nemesis Sudou, one of the sinners from the vocaloid song series The Evillious Chronicles

==== Other fictional entities ====
- Nemesis, a fictional planet in the Sailor Moon Japanese adventure series
- Nemesis, an elite German squadron in Secret Weapons Over Normandy
- Nemesis, the UN organisation The Champions worked for in the 1960s British television spy drama
- Nemesis, a transformation weapon in To Love-Ru Darkness
- Nemesis, a space ship in H. Beam Piper's 1963 novel Space Viking
- Nemesis (Icon Comics), a comic book series and character from Marvel's Icon imprint, written by Mark Millar, with art by Steve McNiven
- Nemesis the Warlock, a comic series by Pat Mills and Kevin O'Neill

=== Film ===
- Nemesis (1920 film), Italian silent film
- Nemesis (1992 film), American science fiction film
- Nemesis (2010 film), German film
- Nemesis (2020 Swiss film), Swiss documentary
- Nemesis (2020 Thai film), a Thai action thriller
- Nemesis (2021 film), British thriller
- Star Trek: Nemesis (2002), the 10th Star Trek movie

=== Games ===
- Nemesis (draughts player), a checkers engine
- Gradius (video game), a 1985 arcade game known outside Japan as Nemesis
  - Nemesis (video game), a 1987 Amstrad CPC game, part of the Gradius series
  - Nemesis (Game Boy), a 1990 Game Boy game, part of the Gradius series
- Nemesis, a story arc and 2000 expansion set of the fantasy collectible card game, Magic: The Gathering Masques Bloock expansion set
- Resident Evil 3: Nemesis, a 1999 video game by Capcom
- Zork Nemesis, a 1996 PC based adventure game
- Nemesis, a villain faction or one of the aliases of its leader, Gerhardt Eisenstadt, in the MMORPG franchise, City of Heroes
- Nemesis (board game), a 2018 board game by Awakened Realms

=== Literature ===
- Nemesis (Angel novel), a 2004 novel based on the Angel series
- Nemesis (Asimov novel), a 1989 science fiction novel by Isaac Asimov
- Nemesis (Christie novel), a 1971 detective novel by Agatha Christie
- Nemesis (Davis novel), a 2010 historical crime novel by Lindsey Davis
- Nemesis (Momen play), 1944, by Nurul Momen
- Nemesis (Nesbø novel), a 2002 crime novel in the Harry Hole series
- Nemesis (Nobel play), 1896, by Alfred Nobel
- Nemesis (Roth novel), a 2010 dramatic novel by Philip Roth
- Nemesis (Thomas play), a 1921 play Augustus Thomas
- "Exile of the Eons", a 1950 Arthur C. Clarke science fiction short story, later called "Nemesis"
- Nemesis Saga (Robinson novels), since 2012 a series of novels and graphic novels by Jeremy Robinson
- Nemesis, a 1989 fantasy novel in the Indigo series by Louise Cooper
- Nemesis, a 2004 fantasy series by Wolfgang Hohlbein
- Nemesis, a 1989 horror novel by Shaun Hutson
- "Nemesis'", a poem by H. P. Lovecraft in Collected Poems
- Nemesis, a 1998 science fiction thriller by Bill Napier
- Nemesis, by James Swallow, Book 13 in the Horus Heresy book series
- Nemesis, a 2000 Magic: The Gathering novel by Paul B. Thompson
- Predator: Nemesis, a 1997 science fiction comic storyline by Gordon Rennie and Colin MacNeil

=== Music ===
==== Groups and labels ====
- Nemesis (Bangladeshi band), a Bangladeshi alternative rock band
- Nemesis (duo), a pop music duo made up of twin brothers Jacob and Joshua Miller
- Nemesis (electronic music band), a Finnish music group
- Nemesis (rap crew), a rap crew from Dallas, Texas
- Nemesis (South Korean band), a South Korean rock band

==== Albums and EPs ====
- Nemesis (Grip Inc. album)
- Nemesis (Stratovarius album), 2013
- Nemesis (Two Steps from Hell album), 2007
- Nemesis (EP), 2016 EP by Bridgit Mendler
- Nemesis, 2014 album from Jayce Lewis's Protafield
- Nemesis, 2012 album from Azaghal

==== Songs ====
- "Nemesis", a song by Arch Enemy on Doomsday Machine
- "Nemesis", a song by Benjamin Clementine on At Least for Now
- "Nemesis", a song by Cradle of Filth on Nymphetamine
- "Nemesis", a song by Earth Crisis on Slither
- "Nemesis", a song by Emmure on Eternal Enemies
- "Nemesis", a song by Fossils on the album Fossils
- "Nemesis", a song by David Gray on Draw the Line
- "Nemesis", a song by High on Fire on Surrounded by Thieves
- "Nemesis", a song by Hope for the Dying on Legacy
- "Nemesis", a song by Morgoth on Ungod
- "Nemesis", a song by Nemesea on Mana
- "Nemesis", a song by Aaron Parks on Invisible Cinema
- "Nemesis", a song by Serenity on Nemesis AD
- "Nemesis", a song by Shriekback on Oil & Gold
- "Nemesis", a song by Vision Divine on Send Me an Angel
- "Nemesis", a song by VNV Nation on Judgement
- "Nemesis", a song by Wolfheart on Shadow World

=== Television ===
- "Nemesis" (Adventure Time), a 2014 TV episode
- Nemesis (Japanese TV series), a 2021 Japanese drama starring Sho Sakurai
- Nemesis (2026 TV series), a 2026 Netflix crime drama
- Hunted (2012 TV series), a British-American spy drama from BBC and Cinemax, previously titled Nemesis
- "Nemesis" (Star Trek: Voyager), episode 4 of season 4 of the 1995 science fiction series
- "Nemesis" (Stargate SG-1), episode 22 of season 3 of the 1997 science fiction series
- "The Nemesis" (The Amazing World of Gumball), a 2015 episode
- Nemesis (Australian TV series), a political documentary produced by the ABC
- "Nemesis" (My Hero), a 2001 TV episode

== Defense and military ==
- Operation Nemesis, a 1920s Armenian military operation
- AN/AAQ-24 Nemesis, a directed infrared countermeasure system for aircraft defense

== Ships ==
- French frigate Némésis, an Artémise class frigate launched in 1847
- Nemesis, a UK-flagged patrol vessel operated by the Green Britain Foundation
- Nemesis (1839), a British warship of the East India Company, used in the First Opium War
- SS Nemesis (1880), an Australian cargo vessel lost in 1904
- HMS Nemesis, the name of several Royal Navy ships
- OPV Nemesis, a 2008 offshore patrol vessel of the New South Wales Police Force
- USS Nemesis (1869), a U.S. Navy ship

== Transport ==
- Bowler Nemesis, an off-road racing vehicle
- Sharp Nemesis, a racing aircraft

== Other uses ==
- Nemesis or archnemesis, an archenemy
- Nemesis (operating system), a discontinued graphical operating system
- Nemesis (philosophy), a classification of emotion in Aristotle's Nicomachean Ethics
- Nemesis Reborn, a roller coaster at Alton Towers, England
  - Nemesis: Sub-Terra, a dark ride themed to Nemesis' backstory
  - Nemesis Inferno, its sister roller coaster at Thorpe Park
- Siderone nemesis, a butterfly in the genus Siderone
- Saint Nemesis (died 250), Egyptian martyr in Alexandria, Egypt

== See also ==
- Nemesis 2 (disambiguation)
- Nemesius
- Nemausus
