= Nibuno Station =

Railway station in Himeji, Hyōgo Prefecture, Japan

Nibuno Station 仁豊野駅
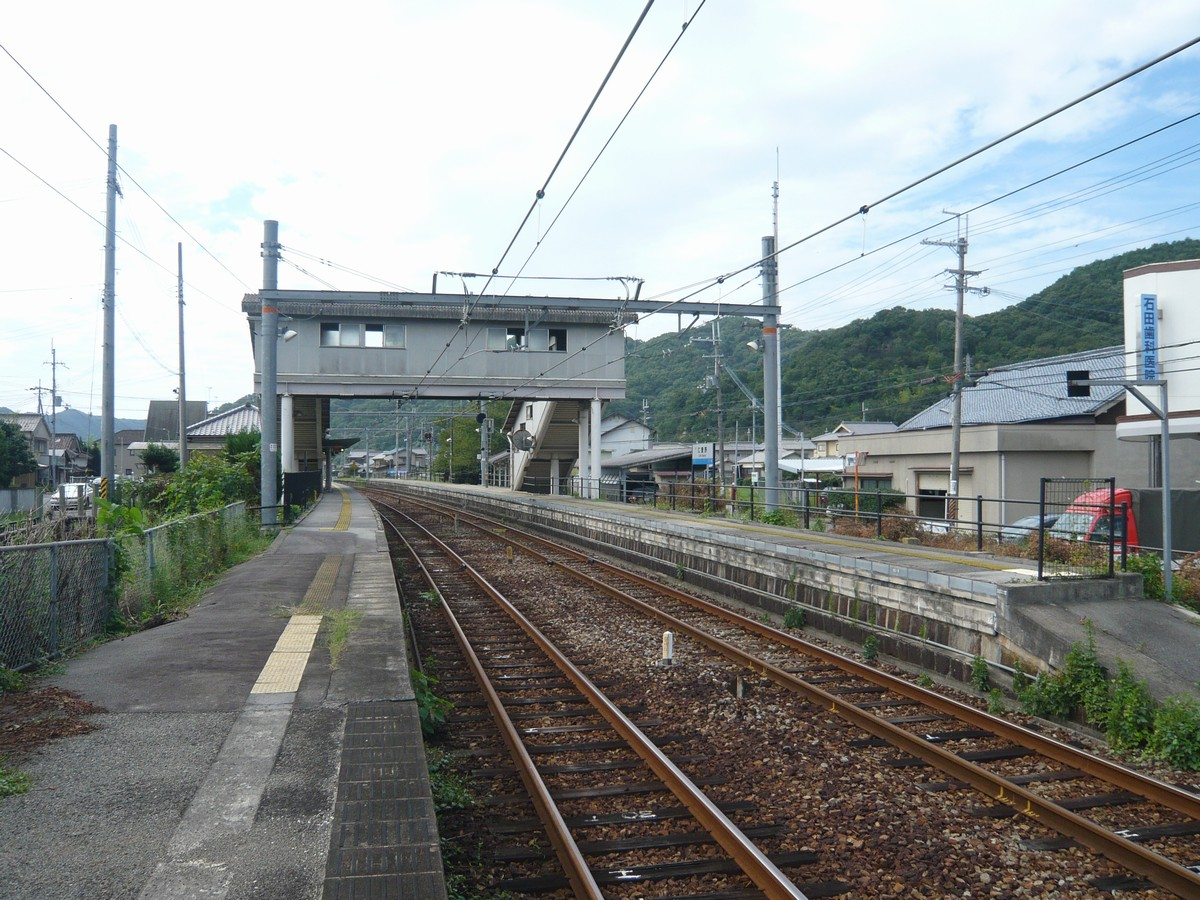
- Nibuno Station Station platforms in August 2007

General information
- Location: 265-2 Nibuno, Tohori, Himeji-shi, Hyōgo-ken 670-0801; Japan
- Coordinates: 34°53′06″N 134°43′41″E
- Owner: West Japan Railway Company
- Operator: West Japan Railway Company
- Line: Bantan Line
- Distance: 8.2 km (5.1 miles) from Himeji
- Platforms: 2 side platforms
- Connections: Bus stop

Other information
- Status: Unstaffed
- Website: Official website

History
- Opened: 19 August 1896

Passengers
- FY2016: 1043 daily
Location
- Location within Hyōgo Prefecture Location within Japan

Nibuno Station (仁豊野駅, Nibuno-eki) is a passenger railway station located in the city of Himeji, Hyōgo Prefecture, Japan, operated by West Japan Railway Company (JR West).

== Lines ==
Nibuno Station is served by the Bantan Line, and is located 8.2 kilometers from the terminus of the line at Himeji.

== Station layout ==
The station consists of two ground-level opposed side platforms connected by a footbridge. The station is unattended.

=== Platforms ===
1	■ Bantan Line	for Himeji
2	■ Bantan Line	for Teramae, Wadayama

== Adjacent stations ==
«	Service	»
West Japan Railway Company
Bantan Line
Limited Express Hamakaze: Does not stop at this station
Tohori	Local	Kōro

== History ==
Nibuno Station opened on August 19, 1896. With the privatization of the Japan National Railways (JNR) on April 1, 1987, the station came under the aegis of the West Japan Railway Company.

== Passenger statistics ==
In fiscal 2016, the station was used by an average of 1043 passengers daily.

== Surrounding area ==
- Japan National Route 312
- Himeji Central Park
- Himeji Rose Garden

== See also ==
- List of railway stations in Japan
