= Tohori Station =

Railway station in Himeji, Hyōgo Prefecture, Japan

Tohori Station 砥堀駅
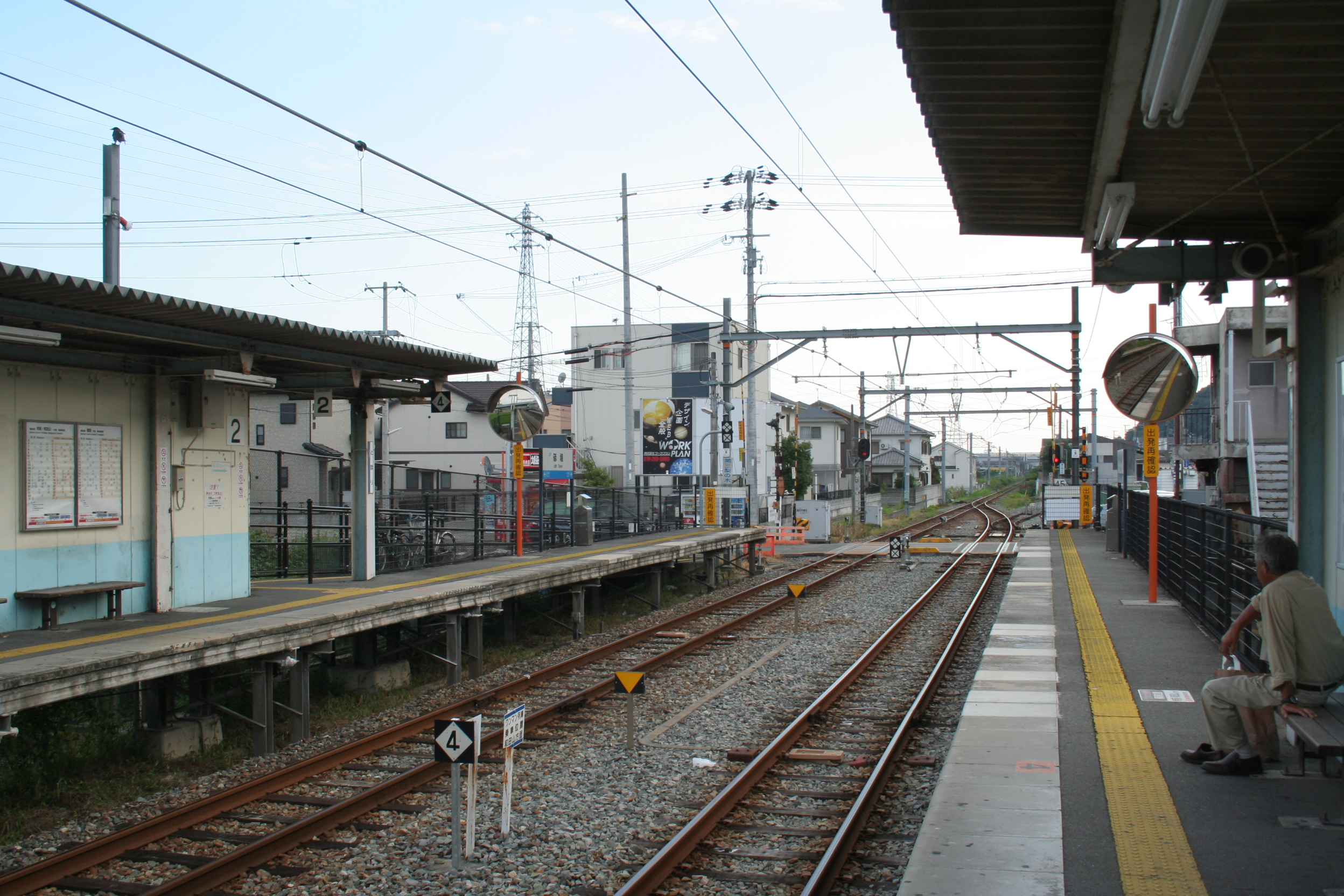
- Tohori Station platforms in August 2010

General information
- Location: 32-2 Takada, Tohori, Himeji-shi, Hyōgo-ken 670-0802; Japan
- Coordinates: 34°51′59″N 134°43′30″E
- Owner: West Japan Railway Company
- Operator: West Japan Railway Company
- Line: Bantan Line
- Distance: 6.0 km (3.7 miles) from Himeji
- Platforms: 2 side platforms
- Connections: Bus stop

Other information
- Status: Unstaffed
- Website: Official website

History
- Opened: 20 November 1935

Passengers
- FY2016: 679 daily
Location
- Location within Hyōgo Prefecture Location within Japan

Tohori Station (砥堀駅, Tohori-eki) is a passenger railway station located in the city of Himeji, Hyōgo Prefecture, Japan, operated by West Japan Railway Company (JR West).

== Lines ==
Tohori Station is served by the Bantan Line, and is located 6.0 kilometers from the terminus of the line at Himeji.

== Station layout ==
The station consists of two ground-level opposed side platforms connected by a level crossing. The station is unattended.

=== Platforms ===
1	■ Bantan Line	for Himeji
2	■ Bantan Line	for Teramae, Wadayama

== Adjacent stations ==
«	Service	»
West Japan Railway Company
Bantan Line
Limited Express Hamakaze: Does not stop at this station
Nozato	Local	Nibuno

== History ==
Tohori Station opened on November 20, 1935. With the privatization of the Japan National Railways (JNR) on April 1, 1987, the station came under the aegis of the West Japan Railway Company.

== Passenger statistics ==
In fiscal 2016, the station was used by an average of 679 passengers daily.

== Surrounding area ==
- Japan National Route 312
- Showa Gloves Co., Ltd.

== See also ==
- List of railway stations in Japan
