= Kōro Station =

Railway station in Himeji, Hyōgo Prefecture, Japan

Kōro Station 香呂駅
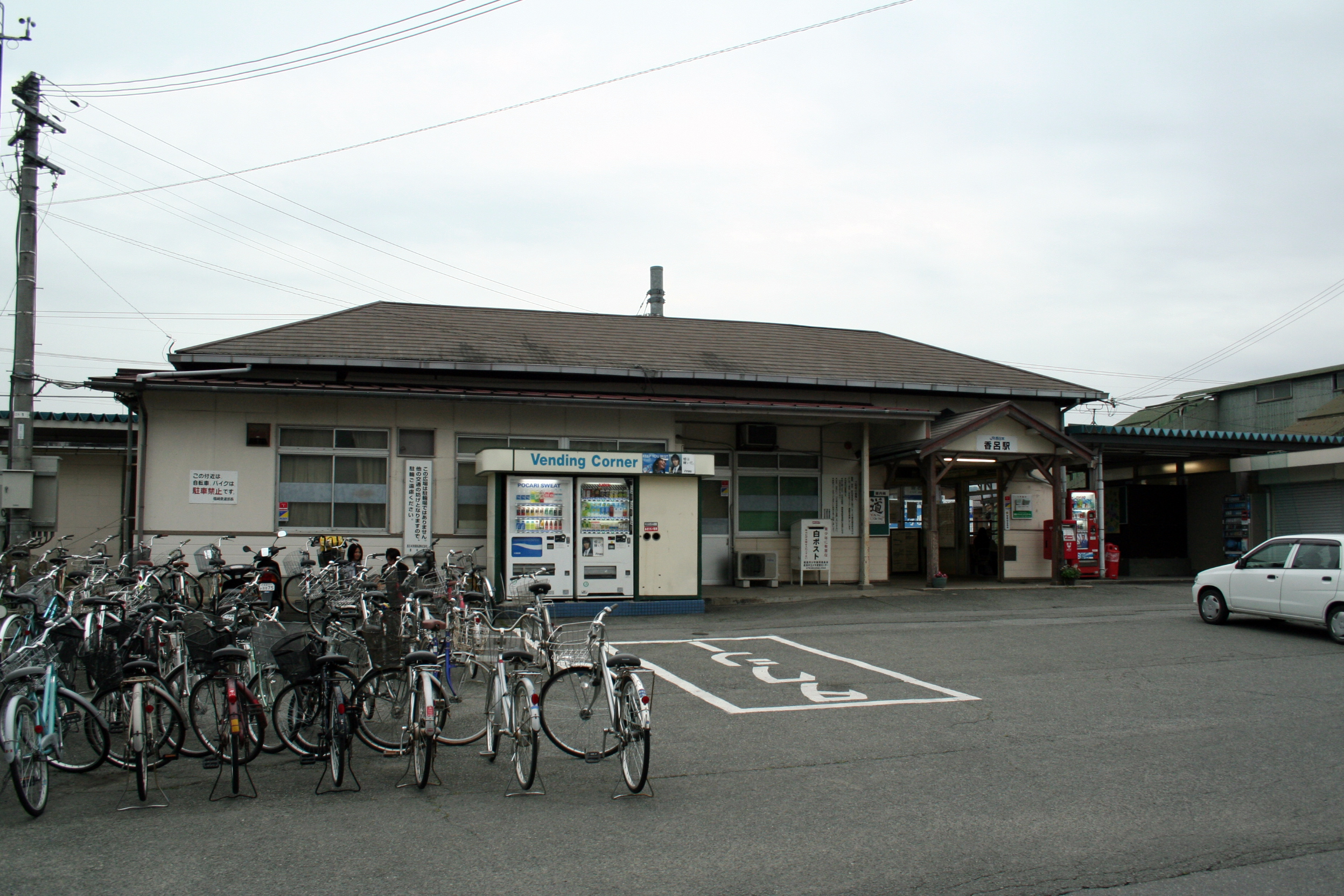
- Kōro Station building in June 2009

General information
- Location: 28-2 Nakaya Koderacho, Himeji-shi, Hyōgo-ken 679-2144; Japan
- Coordinates: 34°54′41″N 134°44′09″E
- Owner: West Japan Railway Company
- Operator: West Japan Railway Company
- Line: Bantan Line
- Distance: 11.2 km (7.0 miles) from Himeji
- Platforms: 2 side platforms
- Connections: Bus stop

Other information
- Status: Unstaffed
- Website: Official website

History
- Opened: 20 November 1935

Passengers
- FY2016: 1557 daily
Location
- Location within Hyōgo Prefecture Location within Japan

Kōro Station (香呂駅, Kōro-eki) is a passenger railway station located in the city of Himeji, Hyōgo Prefecture, Japan, operated by West Japan Railway Company (JR West).

== Lines ==
Kōro Station is served by the Bantan Line, and is located 11.2 kilometers from the terminus of the line at Himeji.

== Station layout ==
The station consists of two ground-level opposed side platforms connected by a footbridge. One of the side platforms was originally an island platform, but the tracks on one side are no longer used. The station is unattended.

=== Platforms ===
1	■ Bantan Line	for Himeji
2	■ Bantan Line	for Teramae, Wadayama

== Adjacent stations ==
«	Service	»
West Japan Railway Company
Bantan Line
Limited Express Hamakaze: Does not stop at this station
Nibuno	Local	Mizoguchi

== History ==
Kōro Station opened on July 26, 1894. With the privatization of the Japan National Railways (JNR) on April 1, 1987, the station came under the aegis of the West Japan Railway Company.

== Passenger statistics ==
In fiscal 2016, the station was used by an average of 1557 passengers daily.

== Surrounding area ==
- Himeji City Hall Kodera Office
- Himeji Municipal Library Koji Annex
- Kodera Museum of History
- Japan Toy Museum

== See also ==
- List of railway stations in Japan
