= Huddart Parker =

Australian shipping company

House flag used by Huddart Parker Ltd.

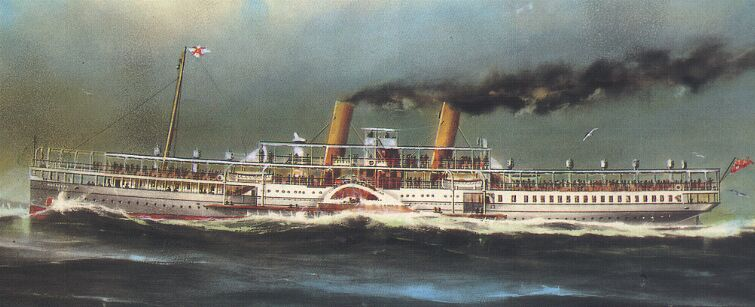
The paddle steamer Weeroona, built in 1910 and scrapped in 1951

Huddart Parker Ltd was an Australian shipping company trading in various forms between 1876 and 1961. It was one of the seven major coastal shippers in Australia at a time when shipping was the principal means of interstate and trans-Tasman transport.

The company was started in Geelong but, in 1890, shifted its offices to Melbourne. By 1910, Huddart Parker had grown to rank 24th in the top 100 companies in Australia by asset value. Several of the company's ships served in World War I and World War II. Huddart Parker ceased to be an independent company in 1961, when it was taken over by Bitumen and Oil Refineries Australia Limited (Boral).

== History ==
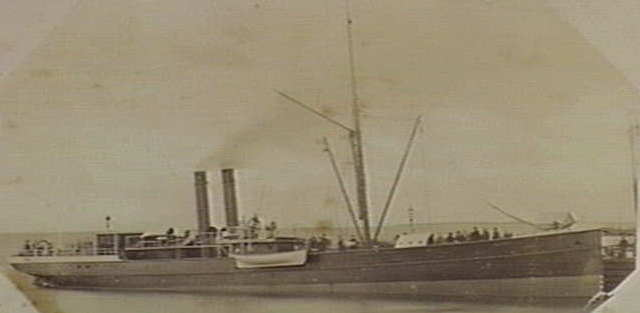
Alert, built for Huddart Parker in 1877 and wrecked in 1893

The company was founded on 1 August 1876 in Geelong as Huddart, Parker & Co. Pty. Ltd, by James Huddart, Thomas J. Parker, John. Traill, and Captain T. Webb. In the 1850s, James Huddart's uncle, Captain Peter Huddart had made his fortune importing coal for use in the Victorian goldfields. He was the first major operator handling coal in the port of Geelong. Parker was a merchant who arrived in Geelong from London in 1853. The trading activities each built up through the gold-rush era and beyond led to a linking of the businesses of their descendants and successors, to become Huddart Parker & Company.

After 1876, Huddart Parker expanded rapidly. By 1886, it had inaugurated the Melbourne–Adelaide shipping service and, in 1882, entered the Sydney–Melbourne trade. During the early 1890s, its steamers were running to the principal ports of New South Wales, Victoria, South Australia, Western Australia and Tasmania and, in 1893, it was also trading with ports in New Zealand.

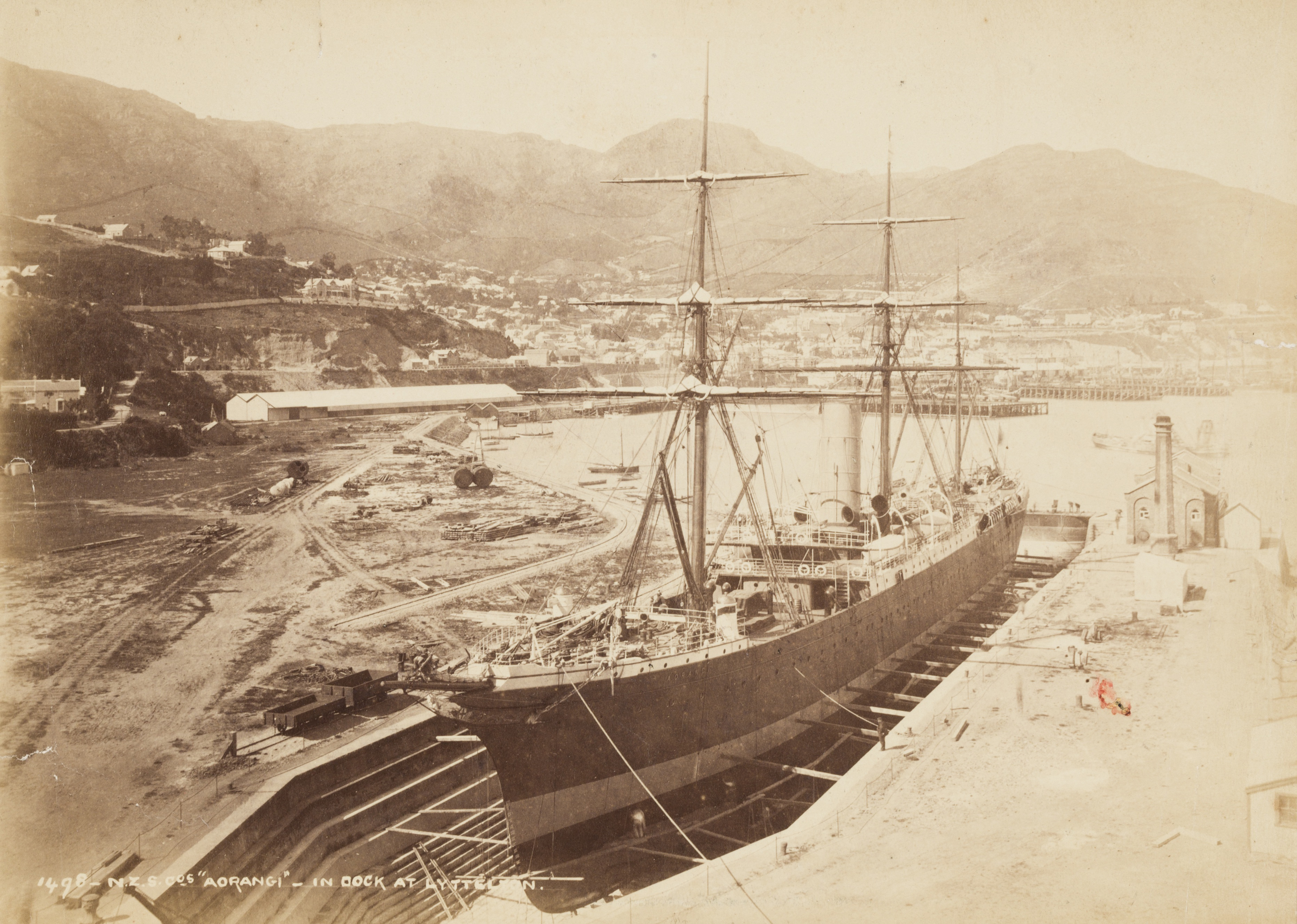
Aorangi, Lyttelton, New Zealand, c. 1894

From 1889, there was a three-way competition on Tasmanian routes (Melbourne–Launceston, Hobart–Melbourne and Hobart–Sydney) between the Union Steam Ship Company of New Zealand, Huddart Parker and the Tasmanian Steam Navigation Company (TSNCo). The TSNCo did not have other routes to absorb its Tasmanian losses, and was bought-out by the USSCo in 1891.

The rivalry between the USSCo and Huddart Parker lasted to 1895, despite an agreement in 1893. There was undercutting of fares, and steamers shadowed each other from port to port. The USSCo Rotomahana and Mararoa would sail alongside the Miowra and Warrimoo, with other ships such as Te Anau and Manapouri sailing before and after, thus bracketing the Huddart Parker ships.

An 1895 agreement between the two lines pooled the Auckland – Sydney profits and losses. The Melbourne – Launceston profits were divided 4/7 to the USSCo and 3/7 to Huddart Parker, and the Sydney–Hobart passenger trade was excluded. The cargo and stock trade was divided 2/3 to USSCo and 1/3 to Huddart Parker.

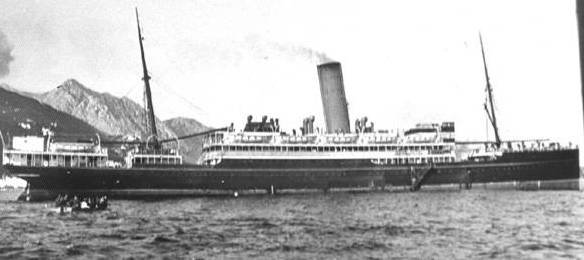
Zealandia, built in 1909–10 and sunk in the 1942 bombing of Darwin

By 1886, one of the original directors, John Traill, had survived the other directors, and remained chairman until his death in 1916, aged 92. By 1890, Traill had moved the company offices from the wharves at Geelong to 466 Collins Street, in the heart of Melbourne.

The company was registered in Victoria in 1889 as a proprietary company and converted to a public company in 1911.

In 1921, Huddart Parker came to an agreement with the Union Company to establish a joint venture on the Bass Strait, under which each company owned a 50% stake in the company Tasmanian Steamers.

During World War I, five of the company's vessels were requisitioned. Wimmera was sunk on 26 June 1918 after hitting a German mine north of Cape Maria van Diemen, New Zealand, resulting in the death of 26 passengers. In World War II, three of the company's passenger ships, Zealandia, Westralia and Wanganella, were pressed into war service.

Huddart Parker was taken over by Boral in October 1961.

== Notable ships owned by Huddart Parker ==
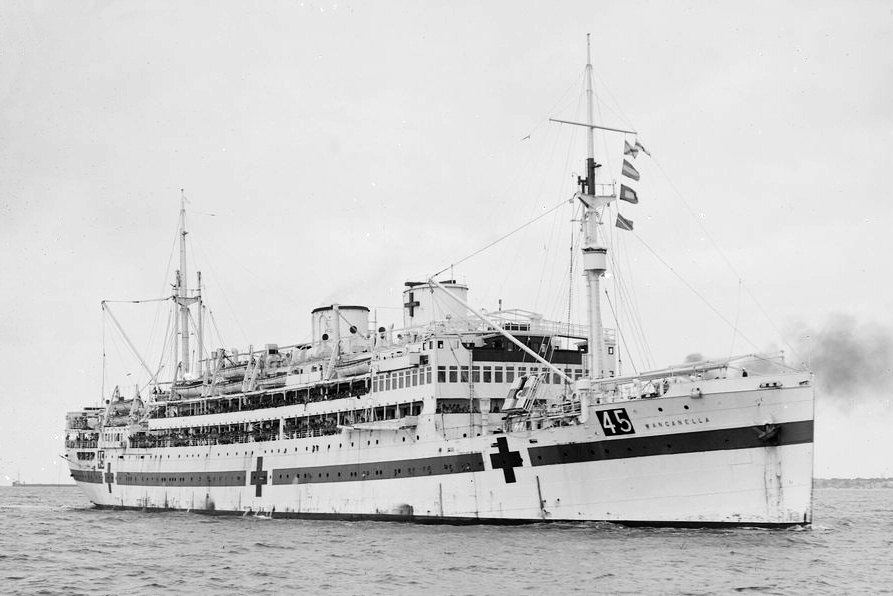
Wanganella as a hospital ship in World War II

- Coogee, bought in 1888 for the Bass Strait trade.
- Nelson, bought in 1890, sunk on her first voyage, at the mouth of the Tamar River.
- Elingamite, trans-Tasman passenger steamer, sunk north of New Zealand in 1902, with a large amount of gold aboard.
- Nemesis, coastal steamer, wrecked off Sydney in 1904.
- Zealandia, 1910–42, notable cargo and passenger vessel that was a troopship in both World War I and World War II, sunk in the bombing of Darwin.
- Westralia, Trans-Tasman liner, in service 1929–60; requisitioned for war service in 1939.
- TSMV Wanganella, Trans-Tasman liner, in service 1933–62.

== Links ==
Media related to Ships of Huddart Parker at Wikimedia Commons
