= Diavlo =

Roller coaster in Japan

Himeji Central Park
- Location: Himeji Central Park
- Coordinates: 34°52′32″N 134°45′49″E
- Status: Operating
- Opening date: July 1994

General statistics
- Type: Steel – Inverted
- Manufacturer: Bolliger & Mabillard
- Designer: Werner Stengel
- Model: Inverted Coaster - Batman
- Lift/launch system: Chain lift hill
- Height: 108.25 ft (32.99 m)
- Length: 2,606 ft (794 m)
- Speed: 48.5 mph (78.1 km/h)
- Inversions: 5
- Duration: 1:48
- Diavlo at RCDB

Diavlo is a steel roller coaster at Himeji Central Park in Japan which is a clone of Batman: The Ride. It is one of the first Bolliger & Mabillard roller coasters to be located outside of the United States, and the second by launch date; opening four months later than Nemesis at Alton Towers, England.
