= Dynamo (Alton Towers) =

Removed Breakdancer flat ride

Alton Towers
- Area: Forbidden Valley, UG Land, Festival Park, Fantasy World
- Status: Removed
- Opening date: 1993
- Closing date: 2003
- Replaced by: Nemesis Sub-Terra in 2012

Ride statistics
- Attraction type: Breakdancer
- Manufacturer: HUSS Park Attractions
- Capacity: 1,300 riders per hour
- Height restriction: 140 cm (4 ft 7 in)

Dynamo was a Huss Breakdance ride located in the Forbidden Valley area of the Alton Towers theme park.

== History ==
Dynamo first opened in 1993 replacing the Cine 2000 as Astro Dancer and was located in the Fantasy World (now known as X-Sector) section of the park. At the end of the 1996 season, the ride was relocated to make way for Oblivion. Astro Dancer reopened in Festival Park in 1997 behind Energizer and Wave Swinger.

In 1999, Festival Park was re-themed into Ug Land. Astro Dancer was also refurbished to fit in with the pre-historic theme and was renamed to Dino Dancer. The ride was removed at the end of 2000 to make way for Boneshaker, and did not return for the 2001 season.

The ride returned in 2002, now relocated to Forbidden Valley as Dynamo. The ride became very unreliable, and it eventually closed and was removed at the end of the 2003 season. The ride was sold to Mondial in 2005.

=== Replacements ===
Alton Towers had proposed a hot air balloon ride to replace Dynamo in 2004 but the plans were declined due to the new height restriction given to the park.

In 2006, the mini-golf game was temporarily moved to Katanga Canyon but removed shortly after. The park's rock climbing wall located in UG Land, Rock Shot, was relocated to Forbidden Valley and renamed Lava Lump. In 2008, trampolines were added to the area around Lava Lump.

In 2012, Lava Lump and the trampolines were removed and a permanent attraction was finally built in replacement of Dynamo. Nemesis: Sub-Terra is a well themed drop ride manufactured by ABC Rides. Later in the year, a horror maze named Sub Species: The End Games was brought to the Scarefest Halloween event based around Nemesis: Sub Terra.
