= SS Wimmera =

Passenger ship (1904–1918)

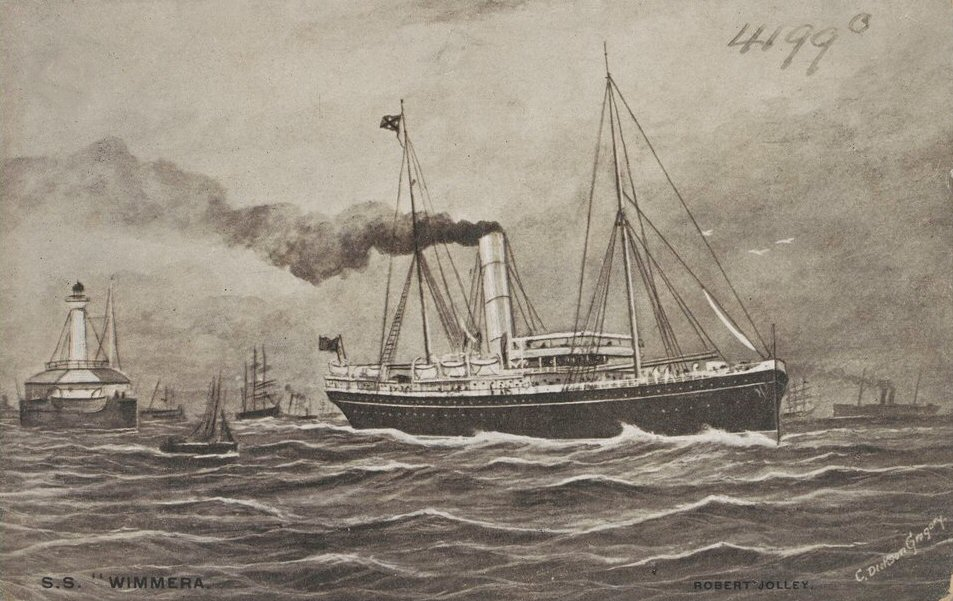
- Painting of SS Wimmera by Charles Dickson Gregory

History

Australia
- Owner: Huddart Parker & Co, Melbourne
- Builder: Caird & Company; Greenock, Scotland
- Yard number: 304
- Launched: 19 August 1904
- Fate: Sunk 26 June 1918

General characteristics
- Type: Passenger ship
- Tonnage: 3,022 GRT
- Length: 335.3 ft (102.2 m)
- Beam: 43.2 ft (13.2 m)
- Propulsion: triple expansion steam engine
- Speed: 14 knots (26 km/h; 16 mph)

SS Wimmera was a passenger steamship that was built in 1904 by Caird & Company in Greenock, Scotland, for Huddart Parker & Co of Melbourne, Australia. She was sunk on 26 June 1918 by a German mine north of Cape Maria van Diemen, New Zealand, killing 26 passengers and crew.

At 10:00 am on 25 June 1918 the ship left Auckland, New Zealand, bound for Sydney, Australia, via Three Kings Islands. There were 76 passengers and 75 crew aboard. Her route was to take her north towards the Three Kings Islands where she would turn west and south toward Sydney. However, at 5:15 a.m. on 26 June 1918 she struck a mine laid by the German merchant raider SMS Wolf and sank.

The 16 Australian merchant seamen who were killed are commemorated by the Australian Merchant Seamen's Memorial at the Australian War Memorial.
