= Mizoguchi Station =

Railway station in Himeji, Hyōgo Prefecture, Japan

Mizoguchi Station 溝口駅
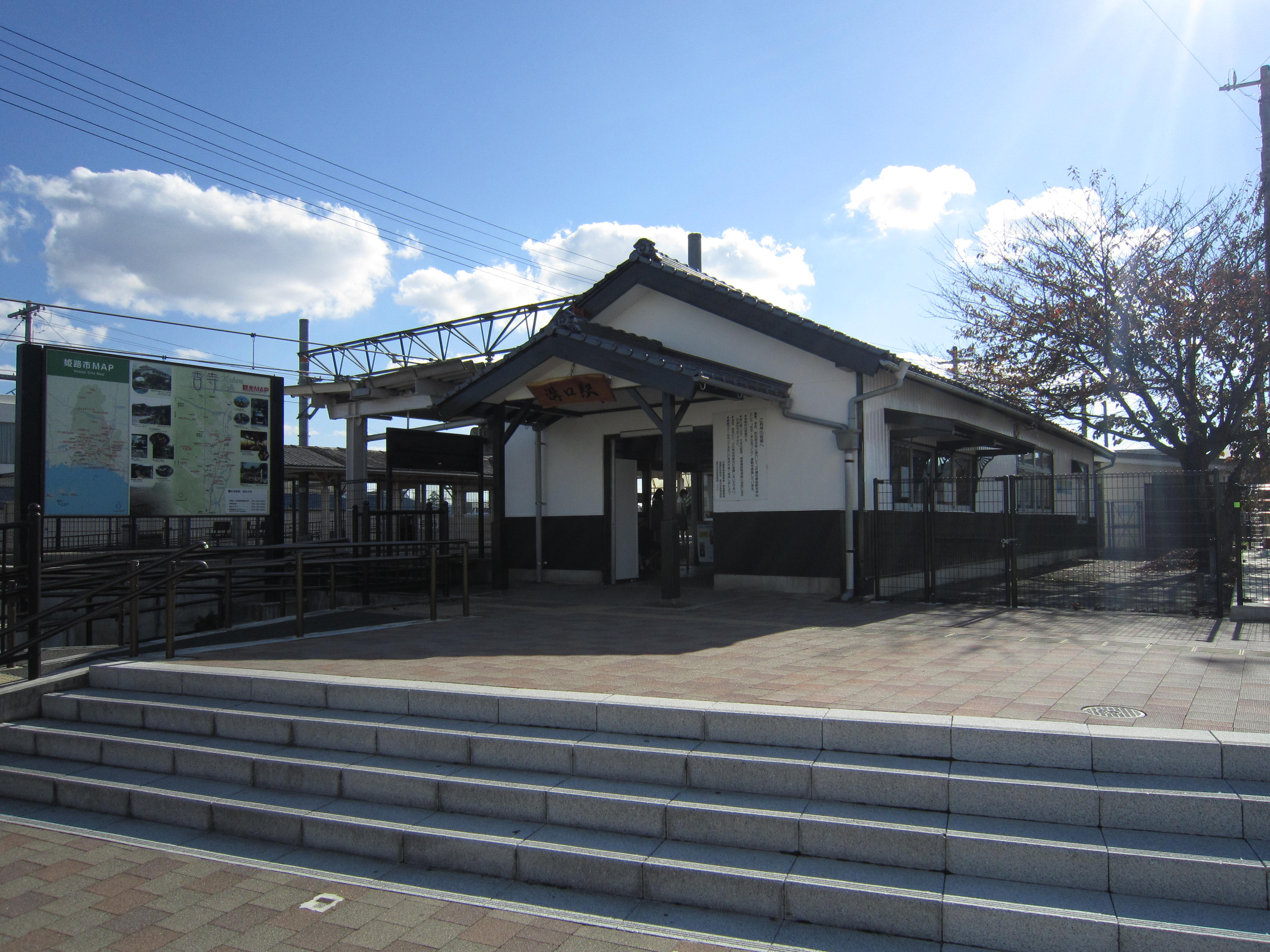
- Mizoguchi Station November 2018

General information
- Location: 13-6 Mizoguchi, Koderachō Himeji-shi, Hyōgo-ken 679-2161; Japan
- Coordinates: 34°55′41″N 134°44′33″E
- Owner: West Japan Railway Company
- Operator: West Japan Railway Company
- Line: Bantan Line
- Distance: 13.2 km (8.2 miles) from Himeji
- Platforms: 2 side platforms
- Connections: Bus stop

Other information
- Status: Unstaffed
- Website: Official website

History
- Opened: 28 March 1898

Passengers
- FY2016: 1742 daily
Location
- Location within Hyōgo Prefecture Location within Japan

Mizoguchi Station (溝口駅, Mizoguchi-eki) is a passenger railway station located in the city of Himeji, Hyōgo Prefecture, Japan, operated by West Japan Railway Company (JR West).

== Lines ==
Mizoguchi Station is served by the Bantan Line, and is located 13.2 kilometers from the terminus of the line at Himeji.

== Station layout ==
The station consists of two ground-level opposed side platforms connected by a level crossing. The station is unattended.

=== Platforms ===
1	■ Bantan Line	for Himeji
2	■ Bantan Line	for Teramae, Wadayama

== Adjacent stations ==
«	Service	»
West Japan Railway Company
Bantan Line
Limited Express Hamakaze: Does not stop at this station
Kōro	Local	Fukusaki

== History ==
Mizoguchi Station opened on March 28, 1898. With the privatization of the Japan National Railways (JNR) on April 1, 1987, the station came under the aegis of the West Japan Railway Company.

== Passenger statistics ==
In fiscal 2016, the station was used by an average of 1742 passengers daily.

== Surrounding area ==
- Nakadera Elementary School

== See also ==
- List of railway stations in Japan
