= MS Wanganella =

20th-century Australian ocean liner

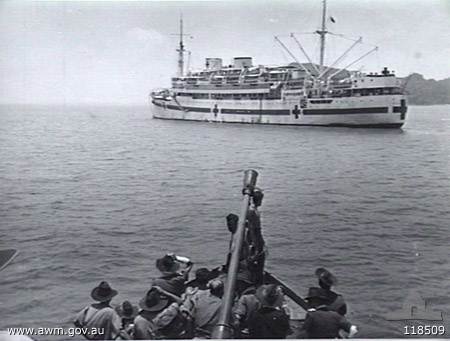
- Australian ex-POWs being transferred to the hospital ship Wanganella two days after their liberation from Batu Lintang camp, Kuching, Sarawak, on the island of Borneo in September 1945

History

Australia
- Name: Wanganella
- Namesake: Wanganella, NSW
- Owner: Huddart Parker
- Port of registry: Melbourne
- Route: Trans-Tasman
- Builder: Harland and Wolff, Belfast
- Yard number: 849
- Launched: 17 December 1929
- Completed: 29 November 1932
- In service: 12 January 1933
- Reclassified: Ocean liner (1933–41, 1946–63); Hospital ship (1941–46); Floating hostel (1963–70)
- Home port: Melbourne
- Identification: UK official number 153950; code letters LHVJ (until 1933); call sign VJPQ (from 1934)
- Fate: Scrapped in Taiwan in 1970

General characteristics
- Type: Ocean liner
- Tonnage: 9,576 GRT, 5,625 NRT
- Length: 461.2 ft (140.6 m)
- Beam: 63.9 ft (19.5 m)
- Draught: 7.6 m (25 ft)
- Depth: 29.1 ft (8.9 m)
- Installed power: 1,305 NHP, 6,750 bhp
- Propulsion: 2 × 8-cylinder diesel engines; 2 × screws
- Speed: 16.7 knots (30.9 km/h)
- Capacity: 304 First Class, 104 Second Class
- Crew: 160
- Sensors & processing systems: wireless direction finding

MS Wanganella was an Australian-registered ocean liner built by Harland and Wolff that entered service on the trans-Tasman route in 1933. Originally named Achimota, she was acquired by Huddart Parker after the original sale to Elder Dempster Lines fell through.

Renamed Wanganella, the ship sailed between New Zealand and Australia until 1941, when she was converted into a hospital ship. As Australian Hospital Ship (AHS) Wanganella, the ship operated in support of Australian forces until 1946, when she was returned to her civilian operator. In the 1950s and 1960s Wanganella was affected by several incidents of industrial action by wharf labourers.

The increase in travel by air made operating the ship less viable, but before the ship was due to be scrapped in 1963, she was acquired and moored in Doubtful Sound, New Zealand, and used as a hostel for construction workers building the Manapouri Power Station until 1970. In April 1970, a tug towed Wanganella to Hong Kong, then later Taiwan, where she was scrapped.

== Building ==
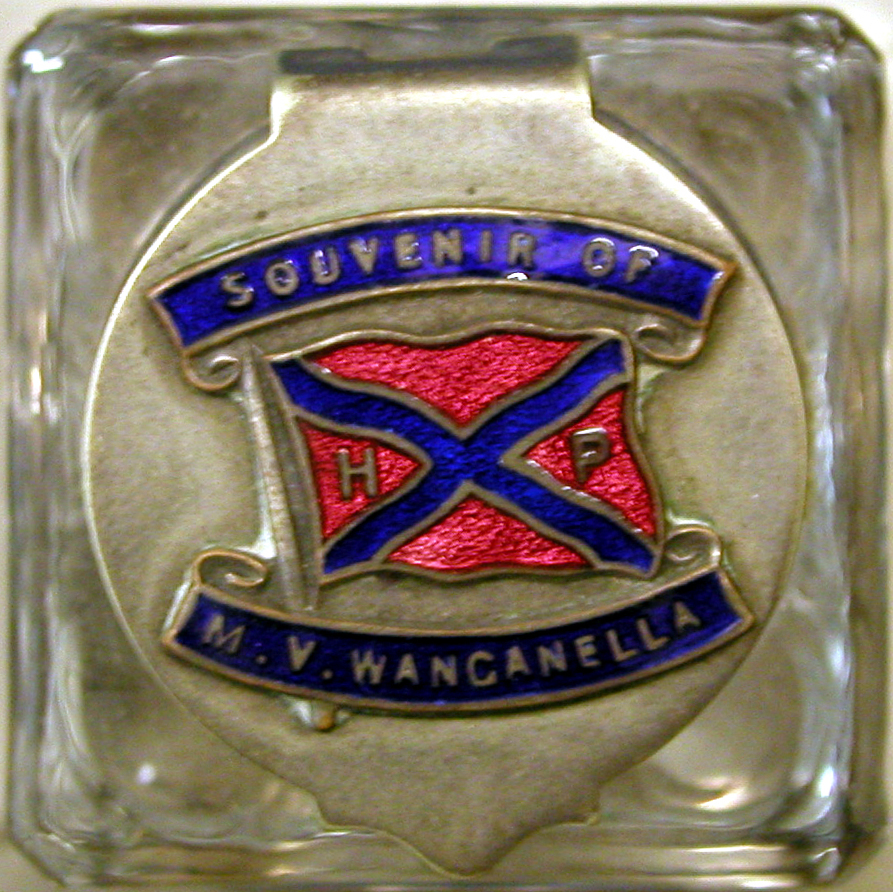
Lid detail of Inkwell "Souvenir of M.V. Wanganella"

Harland and Wolff built Wanganella as yard number 849 on slip number five in its Belfast yard, launched her on 17 December 1929 and completed her on 29 November 1932. Elder Dempster Lines had ordered her as Achimota for its West African trade. But Elder Dempster was in financial trouble at the time and never took the ship over. Eventually the Melbourne-based Australian shipping company Huddart Parker bought Achimota in September 1932 and renamed her Wanganella, beginning regular service on 12 January 1933.

Wanganella had twin screws, each driven by an eight-cylinder four-stroke single-acting diesel engine. Harland and Wolff built the engines under licence to a Burmeister & Wain design. Between them the two engines were rated at 1,305 NHP and gave her a service speed of 16.7 knots (30.9 km/h).

Wanganella was equipped with wireless direction finding. In 1934 her code letters LHVJ were superseded by the call sign VJPQ.

== Operational history ==
=== Before World War II ===
Renamed Wanganella, the ship was a top-rated trans-Tasman ocean liner, with berths for 304 first class and 104 second class passengers. She primarily sailed between the cities of Auckland and Wellington in New Zealand, and Sydney and Melbourne in Australia, crossing the Tasman Sea in three and a half days.

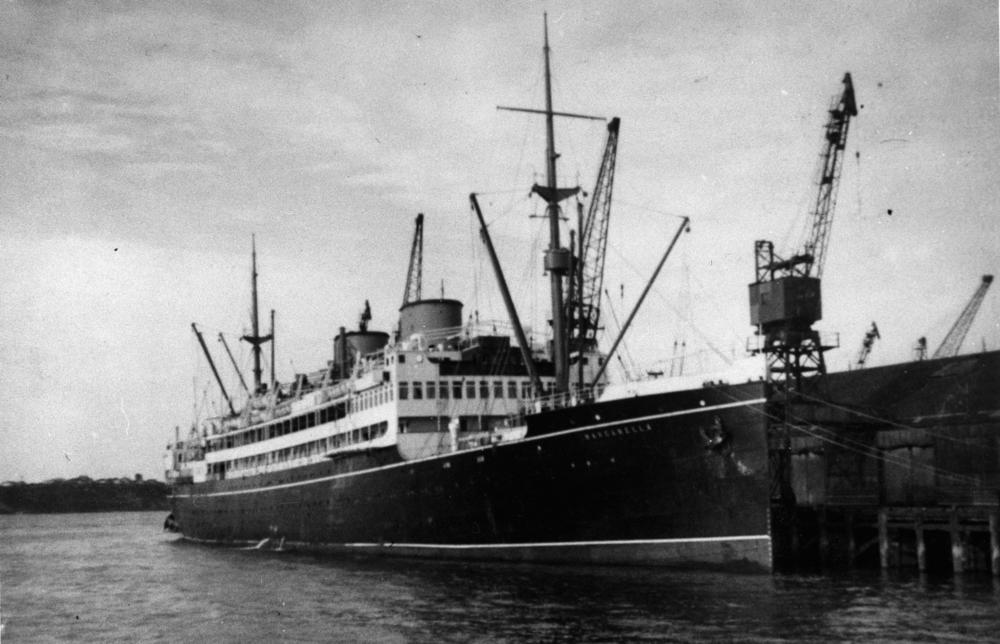
Wanganella in her pre-war livery

On 28 December 1937 she collided with the trawler Durraween off the coast of New South Wales. On 19 June 1940 she helped to rescue passengers from RMS Niagara after the latter hit a mine and sank off the coast of Auckland.

==== Message in a bottle ====
On 11 September 1935, a message in a bottle was put in the ocean, reading:Thrown overboard by Mr & Mrs Robert Hare and son Billy 11/9/35 en route Syd/Auck. Will finder please communicate with above at Ballarat, Vict – Aust, The City Beautiful, Largest inland city of the commonwealth.

This was discovered at Fraser Island, Queensland, some 20 years later, but the message was forgotten until 2018 when the finder sought to research the senders of the message, including the Captain of the ship (Captain R Darrock), and a named witness (W Elsden-Dew). The message had been written on a menu card for an evening meal. The menu, dated Tuesday, 10 September 1935 was one day old when it was adorned with a handwritten note, placed into the cork-topped bottle, and thrown into the ocean. Of note, Mr Robert Hare was Manager of the Huddart Parker Line of which Wanganella was a part, and his son William (Billy) became a leading radiologist and Professor of Radiology at the University of Melbourne.

=== Hospital ship ===
During World War II, Wanganella was converted to serve as an Australian Hospital Ship (AHS). Between 19 May 1941 and 1946, AHS Wanganella carried wounded and sick evacuees from the Middle East, Italy, India, New Guinea, Solomon Islands, Bougainville, Morotai, Borneo and the South Pacific, travelling over 251,011 nautical miles (464,872 km) and transporting 13,385 wounded.

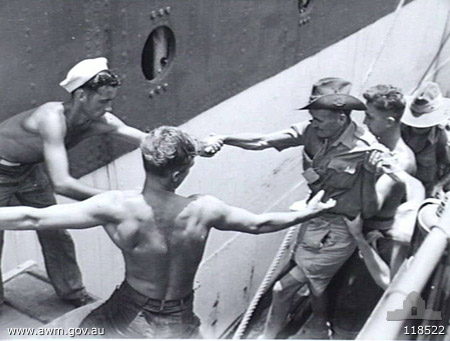
An emaciated Australian ex-POW from Batu Lintang camp being helped aboard Wanganella by naval ratings

A recently-liberated soldier from Batu Lintang camp, Kuching, Sarawak wrote of her:

My first real sight of the hospital ship occurred at a range of well over a mile ... Distances and sizes of things at sea can be very deceptive ... [and] I realised she was far bigger in all respects than I had imagined. Wanganella, for such was her magic name, rode quietly at anchor unperturbed by wind or tide, unreal, dazzling white, clinically neat, a heavenly ship waiting patiently as a lover to receive us. ... I swayed with the motion of the MTB. My liberator Massey laughed at my weakness but enthused, 'This is one hell of a good ship. You'll be alright now cobber!' It seemed a contradiction in terms to call Wanganella 'a hell of a ship'; to me she appeared as a vessel from another world, but I understood his concern to reassure me that indeed there was now hope of a future for us all. The port side of the ship towered high above us. I viewed with dismay the formidable rank of steps leading from the launch to the main deck. ... The slow energy sapping climb began. Each patient, for that was what we had become; was escorted by male Australian nurses. They were taking good care, that even as we had been snatched from under the Japanese heel, we should not fall now, and be claimed by the sea. ... After an eternity of endeavour, advancing one step at a time, one by one we reached the deck. Behind me a voice avowed 'I would not like to have to do that all over again.' It was Slim Landers: I was not sure whether he meant the climb up the gangway or the three and a half years at Batu Lintang."

—

=== Post-war ===
On her maiden voyage after the war, Wanganella had a narrow escape when she ran aground on Barrett Reef (later to claim TEV Wahine with 53 lives lost) at the entrance to Wellington Harbour in New Zealand. On 19 January 1947, while making her first trans-Tasman voyage after the war, Wanganella struck Barrett Reef just before midnight and stuck fast. The weather conditions were unusually benign, and remained so for the 18 days she spent on the reef. Such benign weather is still known in Wellington as "Wanganella weather". No-one was injured, and the passengers were taken off the ship the morning after the accident. The damage she incurred put her out of action for 22 months, mainly as a result of industrial action while she was laid up in a floating dock for repairs. Harland and Wolff sent out the necessary steelwork from Belfast.

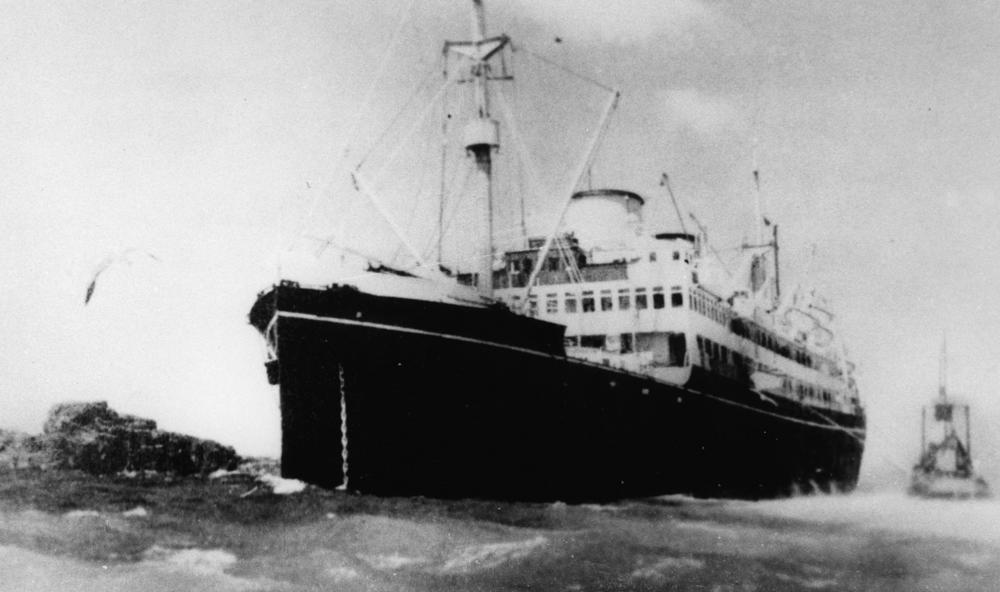
Wanganella being towed off Barrett Reef

Wanganella was caught up again in industrial action; this time in the 1951 New Zealand waterfront dispute. This 151-day-long industrial battle between the employers and the watersiders in New Zealand began when watersiders refused to work overtime. The New Zealand Government, hand-in-glove with the employers, was determined to smash the union and introduced Emergency Regulations. The army was brought in to work the wharves. Wanganella became involved in smuggling money and manpower between Australia and New Zealand, with her Australian crew carrying thousands of pounds to New Zealand from various unions in Australia, in support of their New Zealand comrades.

In about 1960, Wanganella was acquired by the scrap metal dealer Albert G Sims, and was sent to Singapore for breaking up as scrap. However, there was a drop in scrap metal prices, and the ship returned to service on the Sydney to Auckland run. In early 1962, when the owners were taken over by McIlwraith McEacharn Ltd of Melbourne, the ship was sold to the Hang Fung Shipping & Trading Co Ltd of Hong Kong, operating under the same name.

=== Hostel ship ===
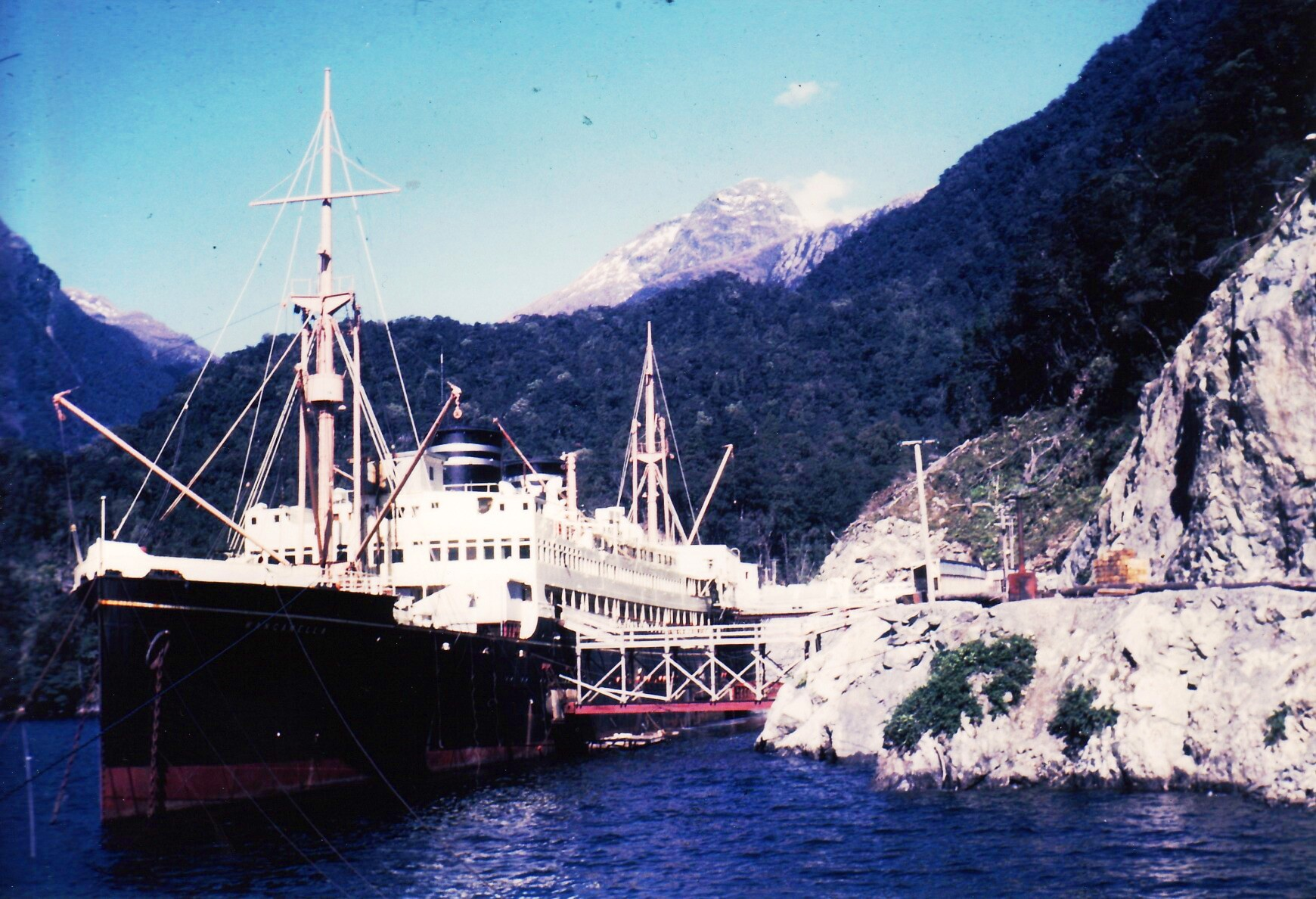
Wanganella moored in a cove of Doubtful Sound. The cove is now known as Wanganella Cove.

During the 1950s and 1960s, the expansion of civilian air travel made trans-Tasman shipping obsolete. In 1963, shortly before the ship was due to be scrapped, engineers working on the construction of the Manapouri Power Station in New Zealand acquired Wanganella.

Between 1963 and 1970, Wanganella was moored in Doubtful Sound to be used as a hostel for workers building the tailrace tunnel, and the Wilmot Pass access road. The vessel became notorious for the drinking culture on board. A popular legend is when the vessel was to be towed away, tugs apparently struggled to dislodge the ship from a bed of empty beer cans that had been tossed overboard.

Wanganella was sold for scrap in 1970, and was towed to Hong Kong, then Taiwan. The cove in which Wanganella was moored and the stream that supplied the water to the liner are now gazetted as Wanganella Cove and Wanganella Stream.
