= Nemesis Reborn =

Inverted coaster at Alton Towers

- Previously known as Nemesis (1994–2024)

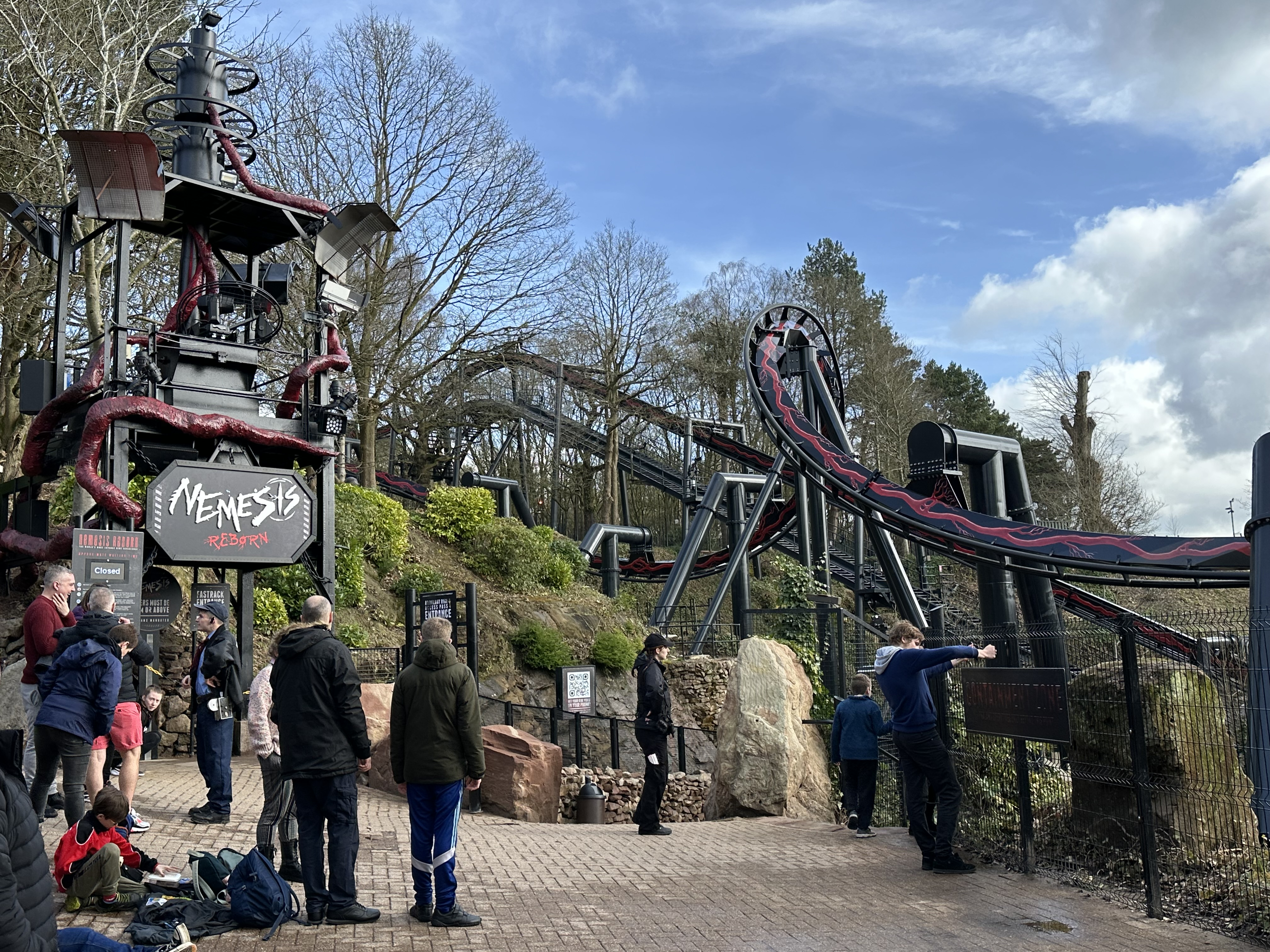
- Ride entrance and first corkscrew

Alton Towers
- Location: Alton Towers
- Park section: Forbidden Valley
- Coordinates: 52°59′13″N 1°52′58″W
- Status: Operating
- Soft opening date: 16 March 1994
- Opening date: 19 March 1994
- Cost: £10 million

General statistics
- Type: Steel – Inverted
- Manufacturer: Bolliger & Mabillard
- Designer: Werner Stengel
- Model: Inverted Coaster – Custom
- Track layout: Terrain
- Lift/launch system: Chain lift hill
- Height: 13 m (42.7 ft)
- Drop: 31.7 m (104 ft)
- Length: 716 m (2,349 ft)
- Speed: 81 km/h (50 mph)
- Inversions: 4
- Duration: 1:20
- Capacity: 1200 riders per hour
- G-force: 3.5
- Height restriction: 140 cm (4 ft 7 in)
- Trains: 2 trains with 8 cars; riders arranged 4 across in a single row for a total of 32 riders per train
- Website: Official website
- Slogan: "Sit back, it's fright time!" & "Back with a vengeance"
- Fastrack available
- Nemesis Reborn at RCDB

Nemesis Reborn, previously Nemesis, is an inverted roller coaster located at the Alton Towers theme park in Staffordshire, England. It was manufactured by Bolliger & Mabillard (B&M) and opened in the Forbidden Valley (formerly Thunder Valley) area of the park on 19 March 1994.

The 716-metre-long (2,349 ft) ride stands 13 metres (42.7 ft) tall and features a top speed of 81 km/h (50 mph), with four inversions, and is built around a quarried terrain. It was one of the first rides by B&M to be installed outside the United States, and the first in Europe as an independent company.

For the 2023 season, the ride was closed for a major refurbishment and retracking with significant overhaul of its theme. It reopened on 16 March 2024 as Nemesis Reborn. Prior to its 2023 refurbishment, Nemesis was positively received by enthusiasts and the attraction industry, and it has consistently ranked among the best steel coasters in Amusement Today's annual Golden Ticket Awards. Two additional rides with the Nemesis brand were later added at Merlin theme parks.

== History ==
=== Development ===
Having acquired the park in 1990, the Tussauds Group began planning a new major roller coaster for Alton Towers near to the existing Thunder Looper ride. It was desired to build a roller coaster that was big, different and exciting, though any plans would be constrained by the tree-level height limit imposed on the park.

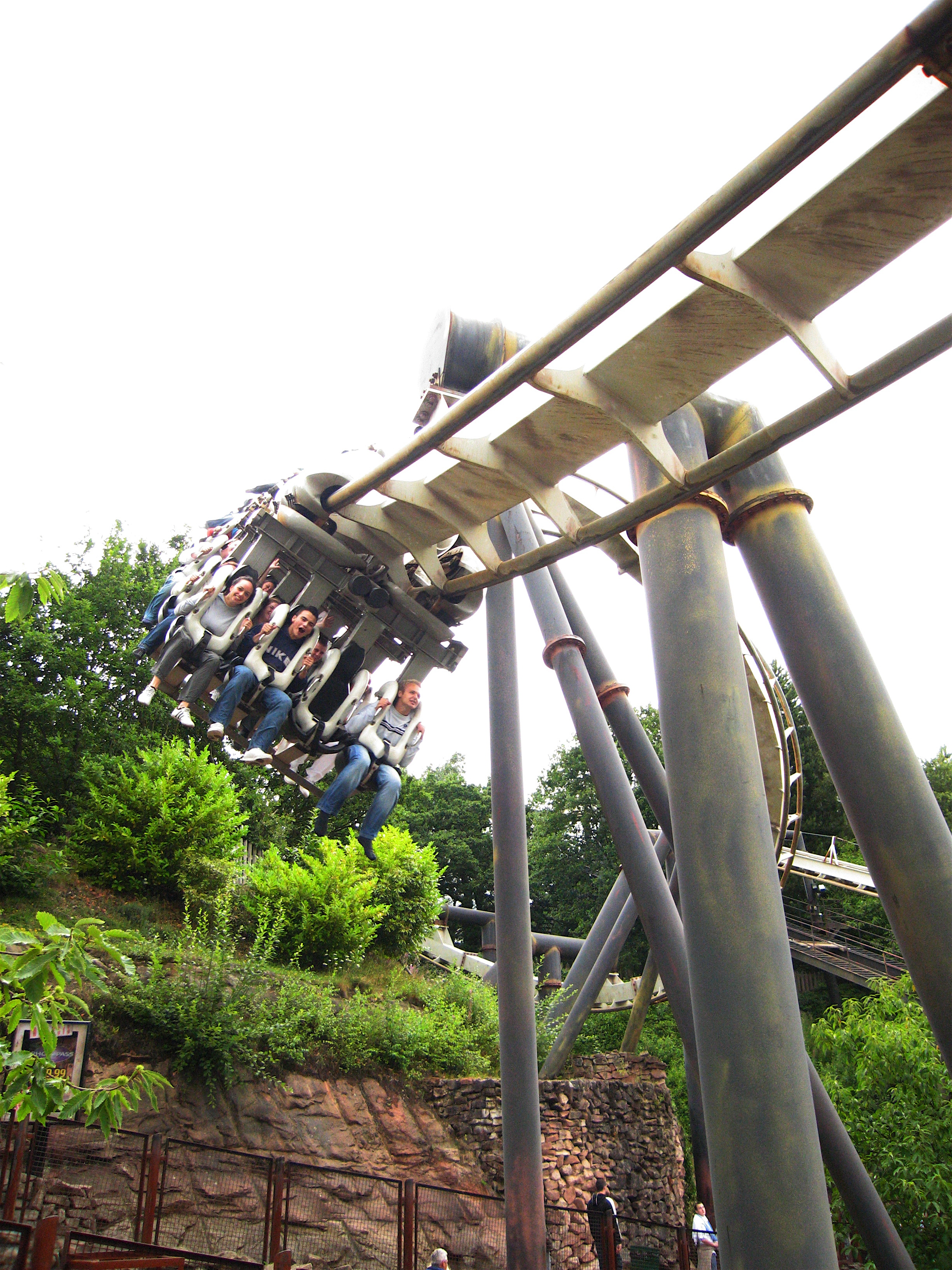
One of Nemesis' trains exiting the first corkscrew (2006)

The first roller coaster proposed for the area was a twin tracked racing wooden coaster, pitched by John Wardley in 1990, but it was not progressed. Alton Towers then approached Arrow Dynamics for the new roller coaster. The Utah-based company was working on a prototype of a pipeline roller coaster, similar to TOGO's Ultratwister design. Wardley proposed the concept for a ride themed as a secret military weapon, tentatively named the "Secret Weapon", and a layout was designed. However, the Arrow pipeline was cancelled when the development team rode the prototype, described by Wardley as "very slow (...) and very energy inefficient".

Tussauds began to look for an alternative and became aware of a new roller coaster model being built by Bolliger & Mabillard at Six Flags Great America, who agreed to privately disclose information. Jim Wintrode, the general manager of Six Flags Great America at the time, proposed the concept of an inverted roller coaster that featured inversions and worked with Bolliger & Mabillard to develop Batman: The Ride. Tussauds directors rode Batman: The Ride prior to its May 1992 opening and wanted to add a similar ride to Alton Towers.

The new coaster, project named "Secret Weapon 3", was finalised by October 1992. The ride's layout was designed by Wardley and Werner Stengel. Rock blasting was carried out throughout 1993 to excavate the site for the ride. The excavated ride landscape was designed create a ride that could be exciting for both riders and non-riders; for example, the downward helix and final inversion were built at the eye-level of adjacent pathways, and the queue line was routed around the track.

Wardley and Nick Varney, then marketing director of Alton Towers, came up with the theme for "Nemesis" as an alien creature discovered underground. According to Wardley, the ride's name was conceived one evening after he and Nick Varney drank a bottle of Southern Comfort.

=== Operation ===
Nemesis officially opened to the public on 19 March 1994, following a soft opening three days prior, having reportedly cost £10 million. It opened as one of the first Bolliger & Mabillard rides to be installed outside the United States, along with Diavlo at Himeji Central Park, Japan, which opened four months later.

In August 2004, Nemesis gained the Guinness World Record for the "Most Naked People on a Rollercoaster". The ride set the record at 32 riders – the number of seats on a single Nemesis train. It took the record from Thorpe Park's Nemesis Inferno roller coaster, which set the record at 28 just three months prior. The ride lost the record in 2010 when 40 naked riders boarded Green Scream Rollercoaster at Adventure Island.

In 2009, Alton Towers received several complaints from nearby residents regarding increased noise emitted from the ride. New wheels had to be installed on the two trains before the ride returned to normal operation.

=== Retracking ===
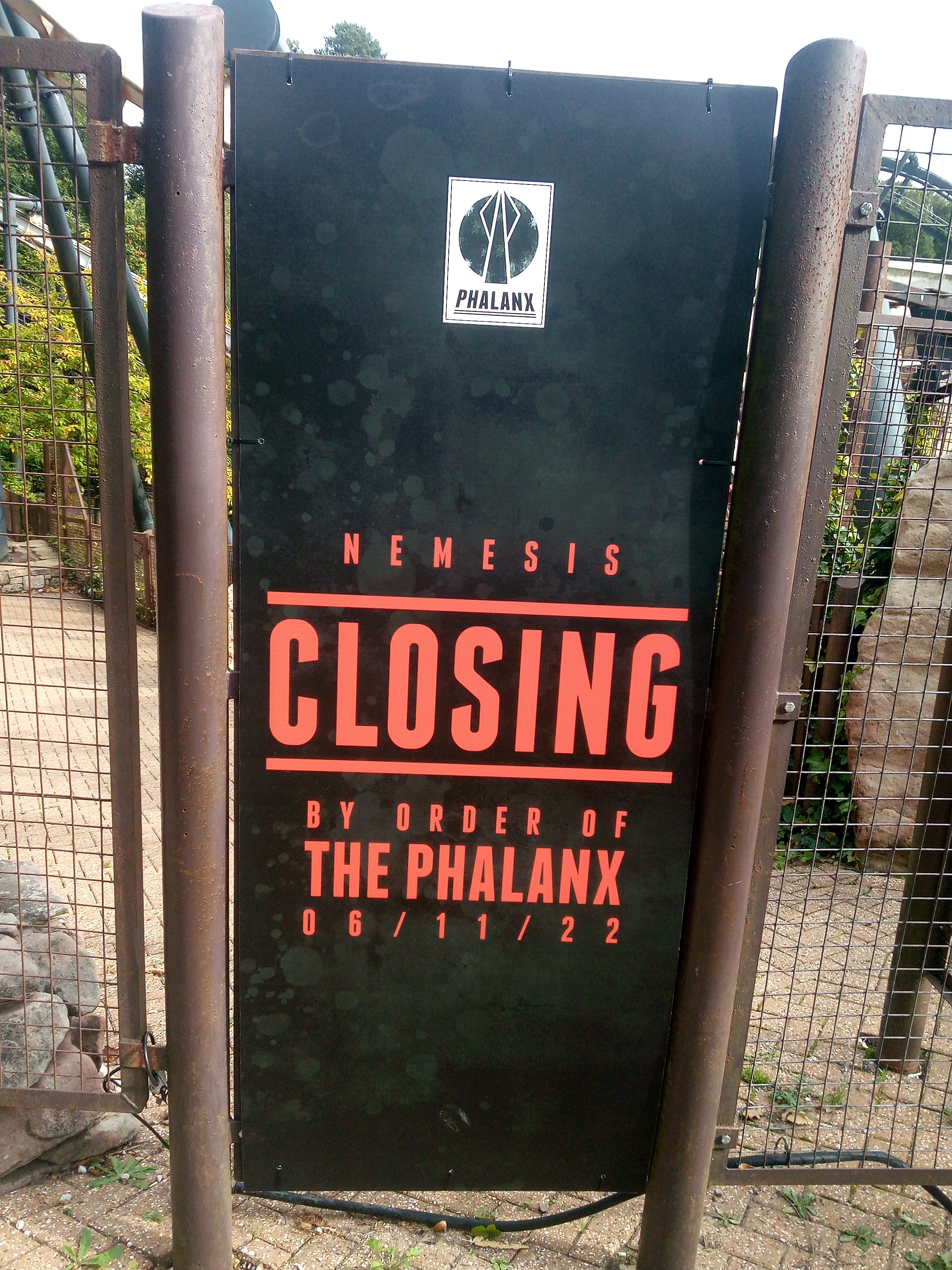
Sign announcing the closure of Nemesis in October 2022

In January 2022, Alton Towers proposed retracking a majority of the roller coaster for maintenance reasons, including replacing 89 of the 117 support columns. Nemesis closed for the refurbishment on 6 November 2022, and reopened on 16 March 2024.

In April 2023, Alton Towers revealed the new Nemesis track, which is black with red veins painted along the side. During the refurbishment, Alton Towers built an observation platform next to Nemesis: Sub-Terra allowing up to 30 park guests at a time to view the construction taking place. In September 2023, the park showcased the new red and black colour scheme of the trains.

A new promotional video was released on 3 November 2023 alluding to the backstory of the refurbished ride. On 8 January 2024, Alton Towers revealed that the coaster would be renamed Nemesis Reborn, and the opening date of 16 March was revealed on 21 February 2024.

== Characteristics ==
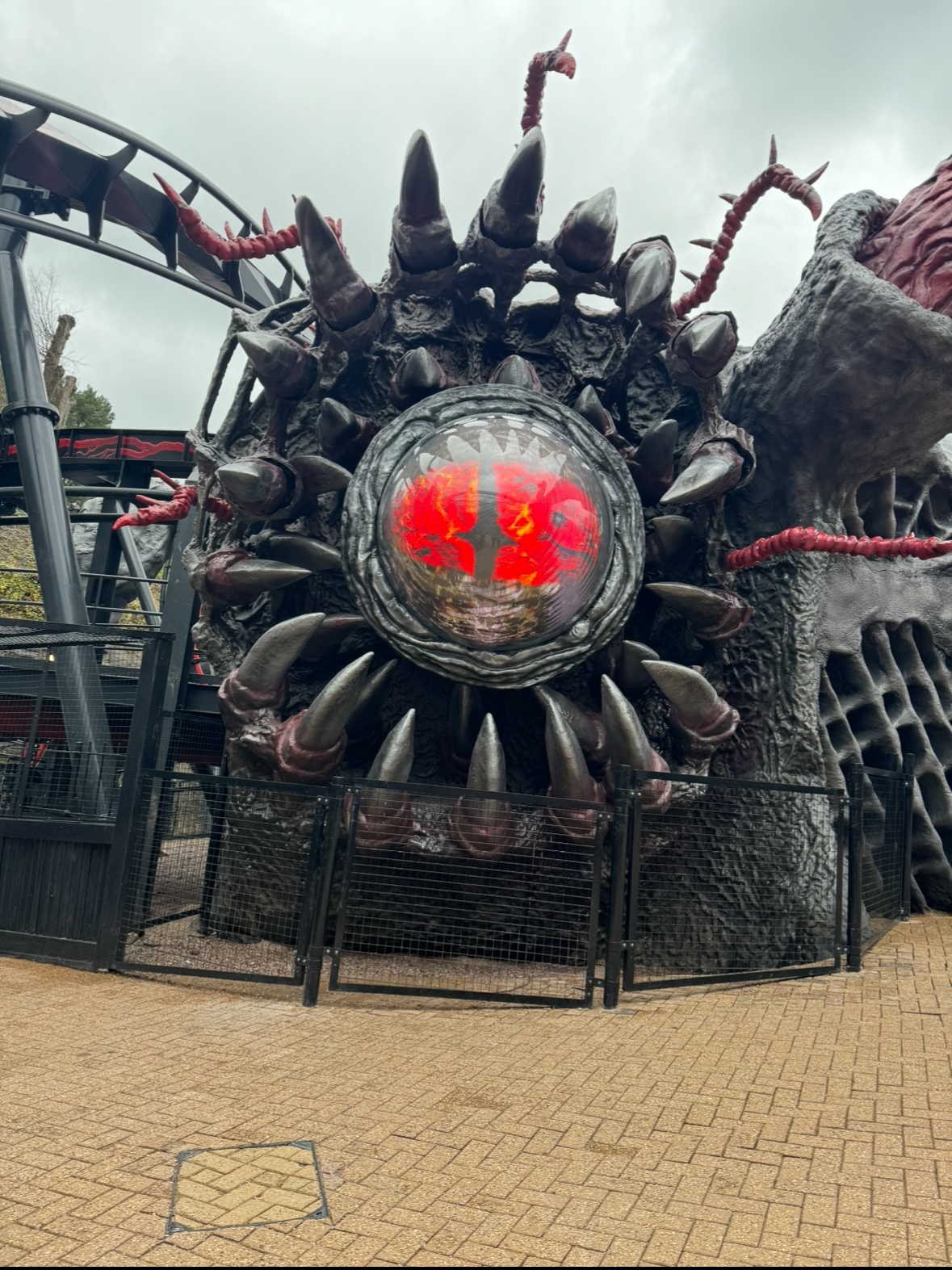
The eye, pictured in 2024

Nemesis Reborn stands 13 metres (42.7 ft) tall, but due to the modified terrain, features a drop height of 31.7 metres (104 ft). Its track length is 716 metres (2,349 ft), and riders reach a maximum speed of 81 km/h (50 mph). The four inversions include two corkscrews, a zero-g roll, and a vertical loop. Riders experience approximately 3.5 times the force of gravity on the 1-minute, 20-second ride. Nemesis Reborn operates with two steel and fiberglass trains, each containing eight cars. Each car seats four riders in a single row for a total of 32 riders per train.

== Ride experience ==
A front-row POV of the Nemesis Reborn rollercoaster at Alton Towers.

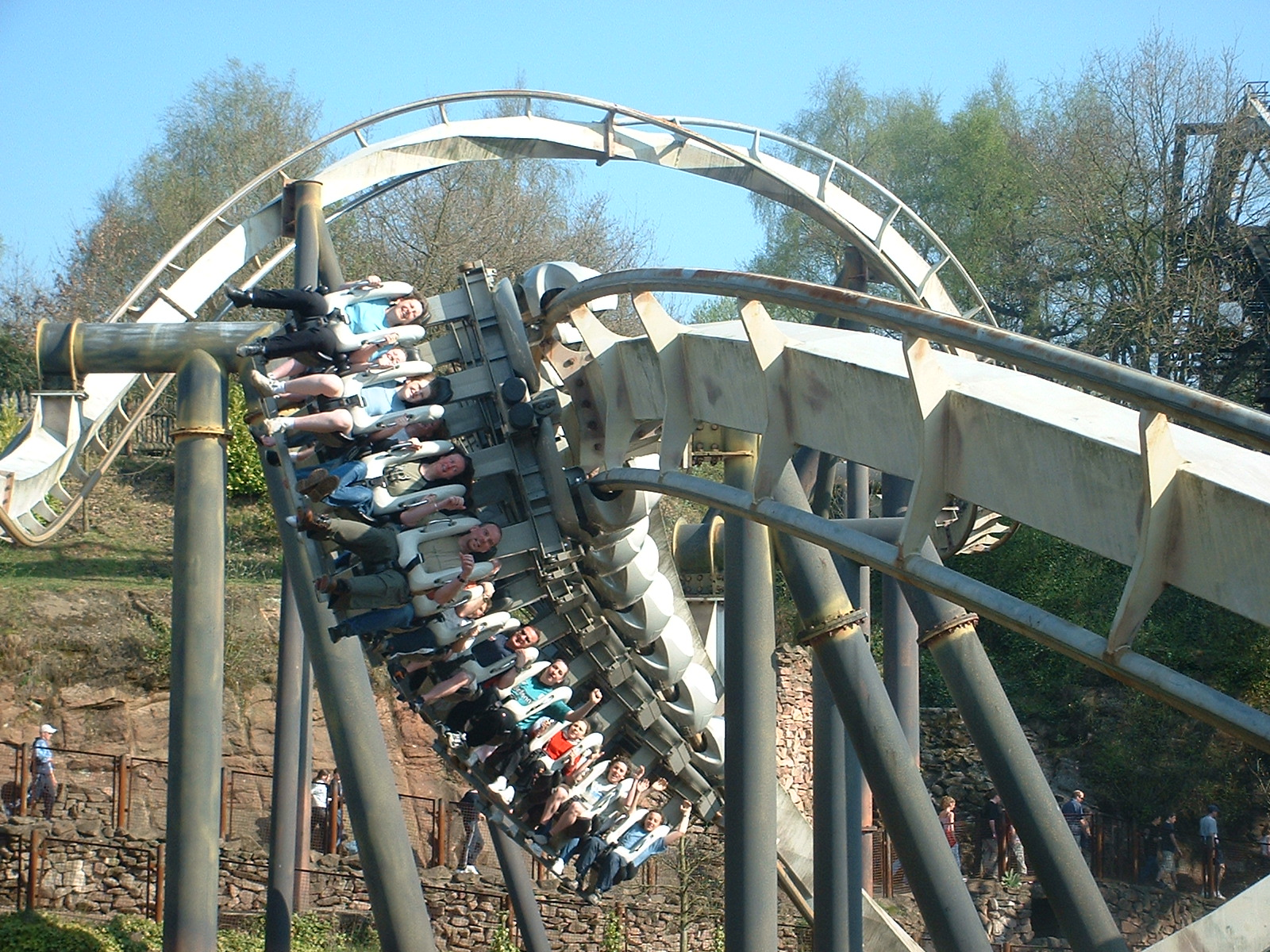
A train travelling the stall turn (2003)

While the ride was operating as Nemesis, riders entering the station chose between the standard queue or front row, the latter of which added significant queuing time, and has been removed for Nemesis Reborn. Riders are batched into rows of 4. Once the train is ready for dispatch, the floor beneath it is lowered prior to the train departing the station. When it does, the train makes a 45-degree, right-hand turn toward the lift hill. Upon reaching the top of the 13-metre (43 ft) hill, the train makes a small dip and a 180-degree turn to the left, followed by a small drop into a right-handed corkscrew. The on-ride photo is taken just before the drop into the corkscrew.

The train then navigates a right-handed, 270-degree downward helix, which features 90-degree banking. This leads into an elevating second inversion, a zero-g roll, where riders experience a feeling of weightlessness in an air time moment. A 180-degree right-handed turn follows, sending riders into the third inversion, a vertical loop. The train then makes a left-turning stall manoeuvre into a second corkscrew. In the finale, the train enters an underground tunnel and makes another 180-degree turn into the brake run, before returning to the station.

== Theme ==
Nemesis was originally themed as an excavation site in which a dormant, alien creature has been discovered. The ride and the surrounding area were decorated with post-apocalyptic, scrapyard features. The station building was designed as the alien creature's body. At the entrance to Forbidden Valley was an old roadheader partly encased in alien flesh. The waterfalls beneath the coaster were also initially dyed red to resemble blood.

At the original launch of Nemesis, guests could purchase a souvenir audio narration on CD or cassette, narrated by Tom Baker, known as the 'Nemesis Legend'. This described Nemesis as a mysterious alien creature from another dimension, found buried underground during excavation work at Alton Towers. Upon its discovery, steel was used to pin the creature down, becoming the steel that forms the coaster track today. In 1995, a limited run comic book was produced further imagining an extended story based on the ride.

The opening of Nemesis Sub-Terra in 2012 introduced the 'Phalanx' as a fictional organisation brought in to control Nemesis, taking its name from an organisation mentioned in the 1995 Nemesis comic. In Nemesis Sub-Terra, the Phalanx find an egg underground belonging to the Nemesis alien, which is being housed in their facility P-A1X. A large nest containing multiple eggs is later revealed to be in a cavern directly beneath the facility.

In the lead up to Nemesis Reborn, Alton Towers released several promotional videos beginning on 6 November 2022, when Alton Towers held its annual Fireworks Spectacular event. At the end of the show, a video was played that featured a Phalanx spokesman announcing the closure of Nemesis, confirming the start of an investigation. A promotional video released in April 2023 depicted surveillance footage from what appears to be a Phalanx testing facility, in which workers are examining the new Nemesis track. In November of that year, a further promotional video depicted scientists extracting DNA from a Nemesis egg before they are attacked and lose control, signaling the upcoming return of the Nemesis roller coaster.

The redesigned attraction reopened in March 2024, now featuring a re-awakened Nemesis with the Phalanx theme introduced to the area, with the creature creating chaos in the Phalanx research facility. The roadheader was replaced with a black helicopter and helipad. All the structures around the area were also repainted in solid black, with added tentacles. Parts of the station were repainted and revamped, and a screen with a video of an eye was added, with 2 rows of moving claws surrounding it.

== Reception and influence ==
Prior to its 2023 refurbishment, Nemesis was positively received by enthusiasts and the attraction industry, and it was consistently ranked among the best steel coasters in Amusement Today's annual Golden Ticket Awards. It was one of only seven roller coasters to appear in the top 50 every year since the award's inception in 1998 to 2025, ranking tenth in its debut and peaking at seventh in 2003; in the 2026 edition, it did not appear. In a 2012 poll conducted by the Los Angeles Times, Nemesis received 37.93% of the vote for the title of best roller coaster in England, while Nemesis Inferno received 0.32%. As of March 2012, more than 50 million guests had ridden the roller coaster since its opening in 1994.

Golden Ticket Awards: Top steel Roller Coasters
Year									1998	1999
Ranking									10	13
Year	2000	2001	2002	2003	2004	2005	2006	2007	2008	2009
Ranking	14	19	18	7	17	16	16	14	13	20
Year	2010	2011	2012	2013	2014	2015	2016	2017	2018	2019
Ranking	18	12	16	20	21	9	11	20	20	16
Year	2020	2021	2022	2023	2024	2025	2026			
Ranking	N/A	32	31	35	37	49 (tie)	–			

=== Spin-off rides ===
Two additional rides with the Nemesis brand were later added at Merlin theme parks. The first was Nemesis Inferno at Thorpe Park, another inverted coaster from B&M that opened in 2003. In 2012, Alton Towers opened another ride with a related theme, Nemesis Sub-Terra, a drop tower from ABC Rides which closed in 2015 and reopened in 2023 following an eight-year hiatus. COMPOUND, a scaremaze themed to the broader Nemesis storyline opened on the 11th October 2024.
