= HMAS Westralia (F95) =

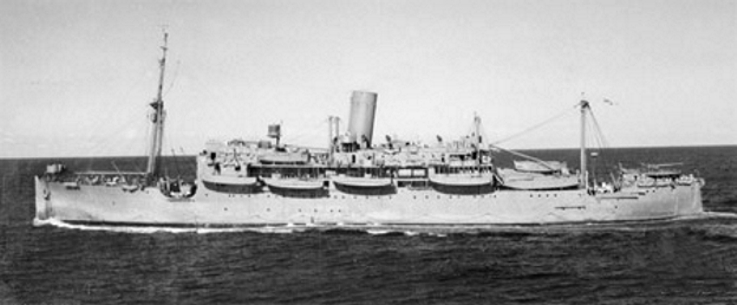
- HMAS Westralia after conversion to an LSI in 1944

History
- Name: Westralia (1929–59); Delfino (1959–1960); Woolambi (1960–1961)
- Owner: Huddart Parker, Melbourne (1929–1959); Asian & Pacific Shipping Company, Fiji (1959–1961)
- Builder: Harland and Wolff, Govan
- Yard number: 843
- Launched: 25 April 1929
- Completed: 1929
- Identification: UK official number: 153935; Code letters: LDRC
- Fate: Sold for scrap in 1961

History

Australia
- Name: Westralia
- Acquired: 1939
- Commissioned: 17 January 1940
- Decommissioned: September 1946
- Reclassified: Armed merchant cruiser (1940–1943); Landing Ship Infantry (1943–1946); Troop transport (1946–1951); Civilian ship (1951–1961)
- Motto: "Faithful and Bold"
- Honours and awards: Battle honours: Pacific 1941–45; New Guinea 1943–44; Leyte Gulf 1944; Lingayen Gulf 1945; Borneo 1945
- Fate: Returned to owners

General characteristics
- Tonnage: 8,108 tons gross, 4,717 tons net in 1931
- Length: 445 ft (136 m)
- Beam: 60 ft (18 m)
- Draught: 22 ft 6.5 in (6.871 m)
- Propulsion: 2 Harland and Wolff oil engines, twin screws, 1,750 horsepower
- Speed: 14 knots (26 km/h; 16 mph)
- Capacity: 1,004 troops (as landing ship)
- Complement: 541
- Armament: (as AMC): 7 × 6-inch guns; 2 × 3-inch anti-aircraft guns; 1 × Seagull V amphibian; (as LSI): 1 × 6-inch gun; 2 × 3-inch anti-aircraft guns; 12 × 20 mm Oerlikon anti-aircraft guns

HMAS Westralia (F95/C61) was an auxiliary cruiser of the Royal Australian Navy (RAN). Built by Scottish shipbuilder Harland and Wolff and completed in 1929, Westralia was operated by the Huddart Parker company until 1939, when she was requisitioned for service with the RAN as an Armed Merchant Cruiser (AMC). Fitted with guns and commissioned in early 1940, Westralia was initially used to escort convoys in the Pacific and Indian oceans. In November 1940, the largest mutiny in RAN history occurred aboard the ship, with 104 men charged.

In 1943, Westralia was converted into a Landing Ship, Infantry (LSI). The ship was used to transport units of the United States Army and United States Marine Corps, and took part in numerous amphibious landings. After being used to repatriate personnel at the end of the war, Westralia was decommissioned in 1946. Before she could be returned to her owners, the vessel was requisitioned again, this time for use as a troop transport supporting the British Commonwealth Occupation Force (BCOF). Westralia was not commissioned again, and operated by a merchant navy crew until 1951, when she was returned to Huddart Parker. In 1959, the ship was sold to the Asian and Pacific Shipping Co Ltd for use as a livestock carrier. Initially operated as Delfino, she was renamed Woolambi in 1960, before being sold for scrap in 1961.

== Construction and acquisition ==
Westralia was built at the Harland and Wolff shipyard in Govan for the Huddart Parker company as a twin screw motor vessel. Assigned the yard number 843, Westralia was launched on 25 April 1929, and completed later that year.

Westralia was requisitioned for war service by the Australian government on 2 November 1939 as an armed merchant cruiser (AMC). She was fitted with seven 6-inch (150 mm) guns and two 3-inch (76 mm) anti-aircraft guns. The ship was commissioned into the RAN on 17 January 1940, and assigned the pennant number F95.

== Operational history ==
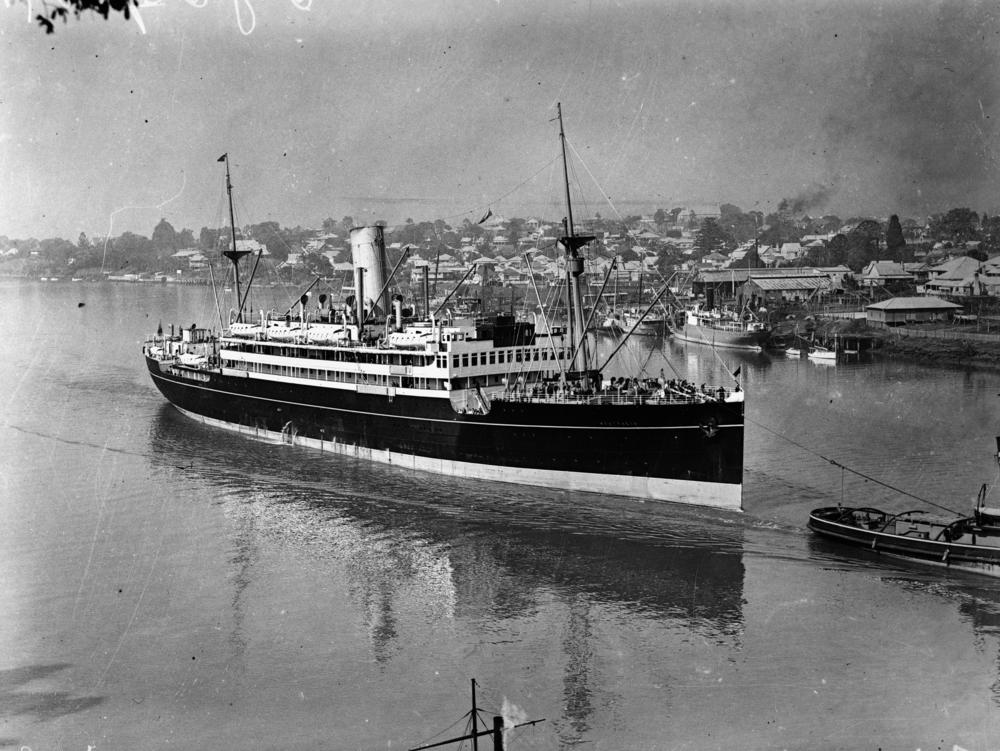
Westralia in her pre-war configuration, on the Brisbane River

Westralia's time as an AMC was spent escorting convoys in the Pacific and Indian oceans, primarily from Australia and New Zealand. In early November, the ship escorted a floating dock from Brisbane to Darwin, then commenced patrols of the Arafura Sea. Departing on the morning of 10 December 1941 Westralia with 445 troops aboard escorted SS Zealandia with another 957 troops of Sparrow Force from Darwin to Timor. The ships arrived Koepang without incident on 12 December. The two ships returned to Darwin on 16 December, then were instructed to make for Cairns; Westralia arrived on 25 December, with 117 soldiers aboard.

The calls to transport troops had come at short notice, and feeding the soldiers had put a significant dent in Westralia's supplies, with the sailors spending most of December on short rations. After sailing to Cairns for replenishment (most of the commissaries in Darwin had been drained to supply Australian and Dutch forces securing the Dutch East Indies against a pending Japanese invasion), the sailors had to work all day to disembark the troops, and when the planned evening departure was cancelled because the ship's floatplane could not be reembarked, shore leave was not granted. At midnight, the change of watch did not occur, as the sailors meant to start work did not report for duty. At around 01:50, the deck officer noticed around 100 sailors gathered near the anchor winches, blocking them from use. After the sailors disobeyed orders to disperse, Westralia's captain ordered the bridge machine guns trained on the men, then took the ship to Action Stations and noted who did not report for duty. The ship's master-at-arms was ordered to arrest those refusing to report for duty; 104 men were arrested and charged with mutiny (the largest number in RAN history), with the ringleaders confined in cells, and the rest agreeing to resume duties. Westralia arrived in Darwin on 30 December, then was ordered to Sydney so an inquiry into the incident could be held: the records relating to the legal proceedings and punishments have been lost.

During May 1942, Westralia was present in Sydney Harbour during the Japanese midget submarine attack.

Between February and May 1943, Westralia was converted into a Landing Ship, Infantry (LSI). She was recommissioned with the pennant number C61. In this role, Westralia had a capacity of 933 soldiers, and was used primarily to transport units of the United States Army and Marine Corps. The ship was assigned to Port Stephens for use as an accommodation ship while the combined operations training school (later commissioned as HMAS Assault) was developed. The ship took part in landings at Cape Cretin, Hollandia, Leyte Gulf, the Philippines, Borneo.

After the end of the war, Westralia was one of the ships at Ambon on 22 September 1945 for the surrender and occupation of the island where the 164 survivors of Gull Force prisoners had already been taken off on 10 September. She was later used for the repatriation of Australian troops, before being paid off in September 1946. The ship earned five battle honours for her wartime service: "Pacific 1941–45", "New Guinea 1943–44", "Leyte Gulf 1944", "Lingayen Gulf 1945", and "Borneo 1945".

Westralia sailed from Japan via Rabaul for Brisbane, due about 17 July 1946, and thereafter Sydney where she was to be converted to coastal passenger service. However, as she was being refitted for a return to civilian service, Westralia was taken up again for use as a troop transport between Sydney and Kure for the British Commonwealth Occupation Force (BCOF). She was not commissioned into the RAN in this role, and operated with a merchant navy crew. She ended her time with the BCOF in April 1949, then was chartered as a troop carrier by the British Ministry of Transport, and served in the Mediterranean until March 1950. Westralia was finally reconverted and returned to her owners on 27 March 1951. Westralia was sold to the Asian and Pacific Shipping Co Ltd in 1959, serving as a livestock carrier. Initially operated as Delfino, she was renamed Woolambi in 1960, before being sold for scrap and towed to Japan for breaking up in December 1961.
