= Nemesis 2 =

Nemesis 2 may refer to:

- Nemesis 2 (MSX), a video game released for the MSX in 1987
- Nemesis II (Game Boy), a video game released for the Game Boy in 1991
- Nemesis 2: Nebula, a 1995 film

== See also ==
- Nemesis (disambiguation)
