= HMAS Durraween =

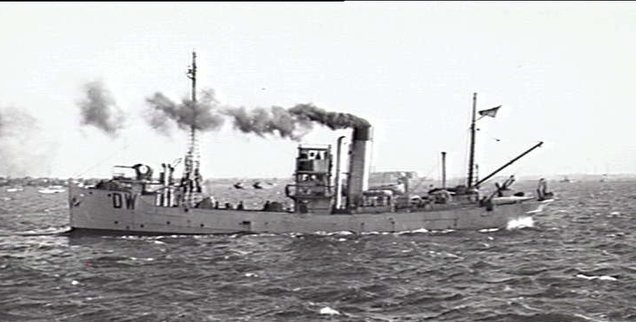
- Durraween during trials, July 1940

History

Australia
- Name: Seville; Durraween
- Owner: Red Funnel Fisheries Ltd
- Launched: 1919
- Acquired: 1928
- Out of service: 1940

Australia (RAN)
- Name: Durraween
- Commissioned: 29 July 1940
- Decommissioned: 1 November 1945

General characteristics
- Tonnage: 271 gross tonnage
- Length: 125.7 ft (38 m)
- Beam: 23.5 ft (7 m)
- Depth: 12.7 ft (4 m)
- Speed: 9 knots
- Armament: 1 × 12-pounder gun; 1 × 20mm Oerlikon cannon; 4 × .303-inch Vickers machine gun

History

Australia
- Owner: Red Funnel Trawler Pty Ltd
- Acquired: 1945
- Fate: broken up in 1952

HMAS Durraween (F93) was an auxiliary minesweeper operated by the Royal Australian Navy (RAN) during World War II. The ship was built as a trawler by Collingwood Shipbuilding Company at Collingwood, Ontario, Canada, and launched in 1918 as Seville. The ship served briefly in the Royal Canadian Navy during the last months of World War I, before being laid up and sold to a British company. In 1928, she was sold to Sydney-based fishing company and operated in Australian waters until she was requisitioned by the RAN in mid-1940 for use as an auxiliary minesweeper during World War II. Durraween operated in the Bass Strait as part of Minesweeping Group 54, and was responsible for clearing mines laid by German merchant raiders, and then later operated around the Torres Strait. She was returned to civilian service after paying off in late 1945, and was broken up in 1952.

== Construction and design ==
After being ordered in 1917, the ship was built as a trawler by Kingston Shipbuilding Company, at Kingston, Ontario and launched in 1918. After launch, she was completed by the Collingwood Shipbuilding Company at Collingwood, Ontario, and commissioned into the Royal Canadian Navy on 31 August 1918. Displacing 271 gross tonnage, she was 125.7 ft (38 m) long, had a beam of 23.5 ft (7 m) and a depth of 12.7 ft (4 m). In RAN service, the ship was fitted with one 12-pounder gun, one 20mm Oerlikon cannon, and four .303-inch Vickers machine guns for self defence. She was capable of a top speed of 9 knots.

== Operational history ==
After being commissioned into the Royal Canadian Navy, Seville served until 14 January 1919, when she was paid off and laid up. In 1921, the vessel was brought to the United Kingdom at Admiralty expense by the Rose Street Foundry & Engineering Company for laying up at Inverness prior to being sold. The ship remained laid up until 1926, when she was sold to Boston Deep Sea Fishing & Ice Company of Grimsby, and registered under the name Seville at Fleetwood. In 1928, she was sold to Red Funnel Trawler Limited of Sydney, New South Wales, and re-registered as Durraween.

After being purchased by Red Funnell, Durraween was sailed from Fleetwood, England to Sydney. The voyage took 92 days, during which the trawler spent some time aground at Cocos Islands, and finished in late 1928. On 28 December 1937, the trawler collided with the passenger liner Wanganella off Montague Island.

On 29 July 1940, Durraween was requisitioned by the RAN for use as an auxiliary minesweeper. During the war, Durraween was based in Port Melbourne, Victoria as part of Minesweeping Group 54, and operated in Bass Strait. Together with HMAS Orara, they swept for mines off Wilsons Promontory in November 1940 and removed forty-three mines from Bass Strait, which had been laid by the German auxiliary cruiser Pinguin and auxiliary minelayer Passat.

In August 1944, Durraween was employed conducting survey work in the Torres Strait. After the war, she was paid off from RAN service on 1 November 1945, and after being returned to her owners in 1946, she worked again as a trawler. She was stripped and broken up at Blackwattle Bay in 1952.
