= HMAS Coogee =

Passenger ferry that briefly served as a Royal Australian Navy armed patrol vessel

History
- Name: Lancashire Witch (1887–88); Coogee (1888–1928)
- Owner: New IoM Steam Nav Co (1887–88); Huddart Parker (1888–1927); G Allen (1927–28)
- Operator: As owners except: (United Kingdom) Royal Australian Navy (1918–19)
- Port of registry: (United Kingdom) Liverpool (1887–88); (Australia) Melbourne (1888–1928)
- Builder: J.L. Thompson and Sons, Sunderland
- Yard number: 224
- Launched: 23 March 1887
- Completed: 9 May 1887
- Identification: UK official number 93722
- Fate: Scrapped and hulk scuttled in 1928

General characteristics
- Type: ferry
- Tonnage: 762 GRT, 286 NRT
- Length: 225.0 ft (68.6 m)
- Beam: 30.2 ft (9.2 m)
- Depth: 13.5 ft (4.1 m)
- Installed power: 281 NHP
- Propulsion: 1 × triple-expansion steam engine; 1 × screw

HMAS Coogee was a passenger ferry that briefly served as a Royal Australian Navy armed patrol vessel and minesweeper in the latter part of the First World War. She was launched in 1887 and scuttled in 1928.

== History ==
J.L. Thompson and Sons built her at North Sands, Sunderland as Lancashire Witch, launching her on 23 March 1887 and completing her on 9 May. John Dickinson and Son of Monkwearmouth built her triple-expansion steam engines.

The New Isle of Man Steam Navigation Company had ordered her to be a ferry between Liverpool and the Isle of Man. However, in 1888 Huddart Parker bought her, renamed her Coogee and registered her in Melbourne.

On 20 May 1918 the Royal Australian Navy requisitioned Coogee and commissioned her as a minesweeper for the Bass Strait and as an armed patrol vessel. In 1919 the RAN returned her to her owners. In 1921 the Postmaster-General's Department chartered her to repair the Bass Strait cable.

== Fate ==
In 1927 Huddart Parker sold Coogee for scrap. Her engines were removed and she was scuttled outside Port Phillip Bay in 1928 at 38°18′12″S 144°35′0″E. The wreck is now a popular dive site.
