= Nozato Station =

Railway station in Himeji, Hyōgo Prefecture, Japan

Nozato Station 野里駅
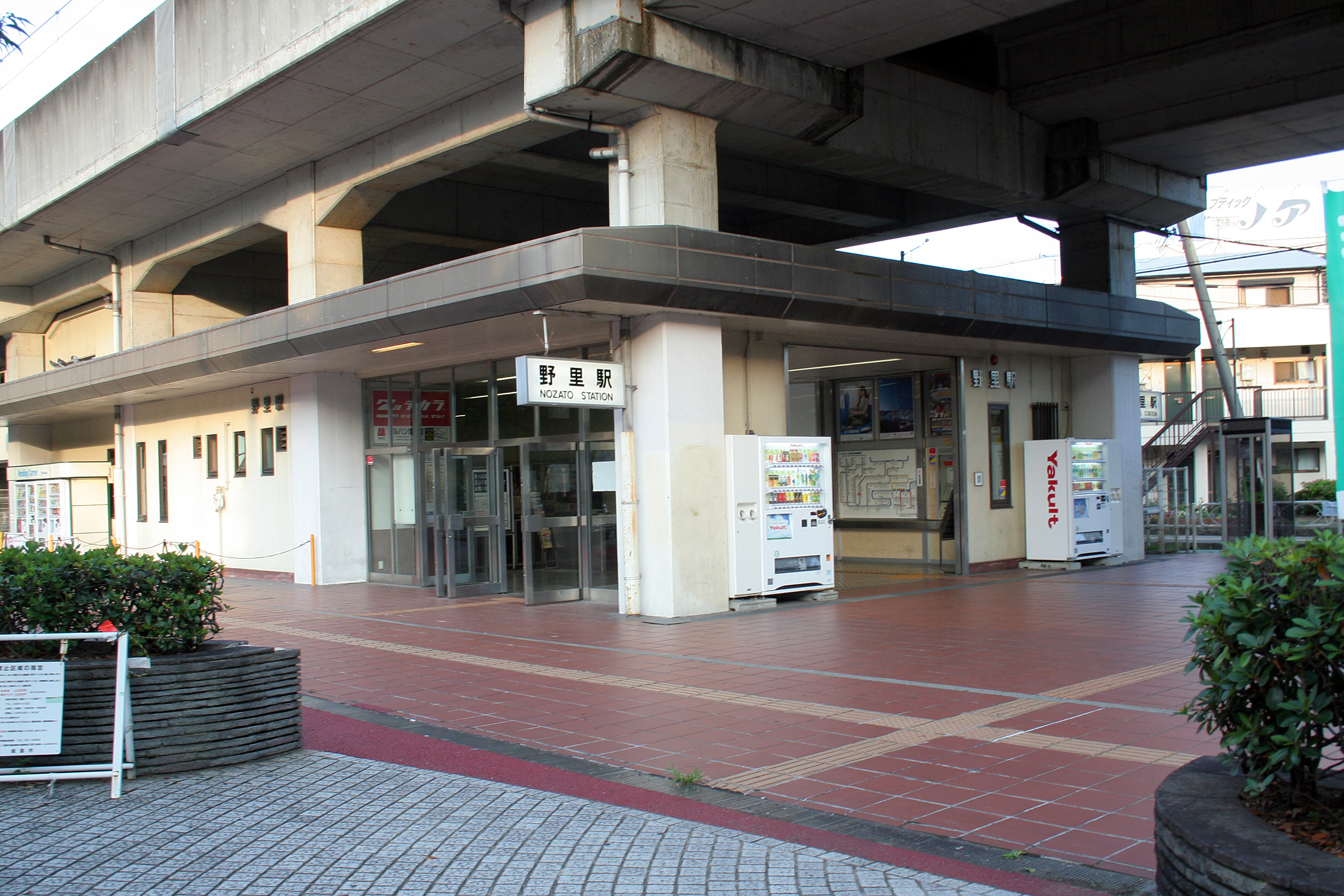
- Nozato Station entrance in August 2010

General information
- Location: 418-2 Kitakamiya, Jōtomachi,, Himeji-shi, Hyōgo-ken 670-0851; Japan
- Coordinates: 34°51′22″N 134°42′41″E
- Owner: West Japan Railway Company
- Operator: West Japan Railway Company
- Line: Bantan Line
- Distance: 4.3 km (2.7 miles) from Himeji
- Platforms: 1 island platforms
- Connections: Bus stop

Other information
- Status: Unstaffed
- Website: Official website

History
- Opened: 26 July 1894

Passengers
- FY2016: 1851 daily
Location
- Location within Hyōgo Prefecture Location within Japan

Nozato Station (野里駅, Nozato-eki) is a passenger railway station located in the city of Himeji, Hyōgo Prefecture, Japan, operated by West Japan Railway Company (JR West).

== Lines ==
Nozato Station is served by the Bantan Line, and is located 4.3 kilometers from the terminus of the line at Himeji.

== Station layout ==
The station consists of one elevated island platform with the station building underneath. The station is unattended.

=== Platforms ===
1	■ Bantan Line	for Himeji
2	■ Bantan Line	for Teramae, Wadayama

== Adjacent stations ==
«	Service	»
West Japan Railway Company
Bantan Line
Limited Express Hamakaze: Does not stop at this station
Kyōguchi	Local	Tohori

== History ==
Nozato Station opened on July 26, 1894. With the privatization of the Japan National Railways (JNR) on April 1, 1987, the station came under the aegis of the West Japan Railway Company.

== Passenger statistics ==
In fiscal 2016, the station was used by an average of 1851 passengers daily.

== Surrounding area ==
- Himeji Nishinakajima Post Office
- Himeji City Library Hanakita Annex (Reopened on April 13, 2019)
- Hananokita Citizen's Square

== See also ==
- List of railway stations in Japan
