= Nemesis (philosophy) =

Nemesis (Greek: νέμεσις) is a philosophical term first created by Aristotle in his Nicomachean Ethics. The term means one who feels pain caused by others' undeserved success. It is part of a trio of terms, with epikhairekakia (ἐπιχαιρεκακία ) meaning one who takes pleasure in others' pain, similar to Schadenfreude, and phthonos (φθόνος) meaning one who feels pain caused by any pleasure, deserved or not, similar to envy.

It is the opposite of pity, as pity is pain at undeserved misfortune.
