= SS Nemesis =

Australian ship sunk in 1904

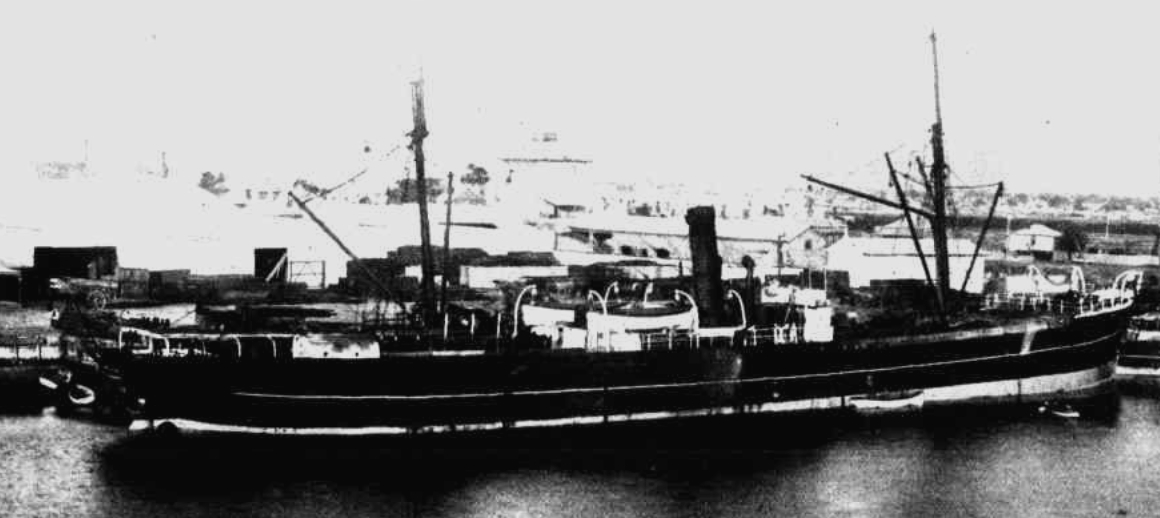
- SS Nemesis at Port Adelaide c.1903

History
- Name: Nemesis
- Owner: Huddart, Parker & Co
- Port of registry: (Australia) Melbourne
- Builder: Thomas Turnbull & Sons
- Yard number: 73
- Launched: 30 December 1880
- Identification: Melbourne Registry No. 82666
- Fate: Sunk during storm on 9 July 1904

General characteristics
- Crew: 32

SS Nemesis was a 1,393-ton cargo vessel built by Thomas Turnbull & Sons at Whitby in 1880. While on a voyage from Newcastle to Melbourne laden with coal and coke, she foundered south of Sydney on 9 July 1904 during a storm, with the loss of 32 crew.

== Service ==
Designed as a collier for the coastal transport of coal from Newcastle to Melbourne. She was fitted out to transport passengers during the Coolgardie gold rush in Western Australia in the early 1890s. Afterwards, she was refitted and used again to transport coal and coke between Newcastle and Melbourne.

== Loss ==
Working as an interstate collier, Nemesis, was carrying a cargo of coal and coke from Newcastle to Melbourne, but encountered a fierce gale. The gale was one of the worst to strike the NSW coast. It lasted 27 hours, blowing at an average of least 30 miles per hour (48km/h), peaking at an average of 40 m.p.h., with gusts to at least 58 m.p.h. (93 km/h) and up to 70 m.p.h. (113 km/h). Subsequently known as 'the Nemesis gale', it was regarded as being more severe than the notorious 'Maitland gale' of 1898.

Nemesis was last seen, from another ship, Marloo, for half an hour around 2:45 pm, on 9 July 1904, 10 miles off Coalcliff, heading south against the weather at only one knot, but seemingly not in trouble. Later, some rocket flares were sighted, as a signal that the ship was in distress, but weather and sea conditions were such that a rescue was not attempted. The ship and all 32 of her crew were lost. Some wreckage, including part of the ship's wheel, a cabin door, 17 cargo hatches, 20 life belts, a boat and part of another boat, a dining room chair that had been screwed to the floor, and a parcel box bearing the ship's name washed ashore, around Cronulla Beach, as did the bodies of some of her crew. More wreckage was also found south of Jibbon Point, to the south of Port Hacking, and a spar believed to be from the ship was seen floating 20 miles off Sydney Heads. The nature of the wreckage attested to the ferocity of the storm. The master of Marloo gave evidence to a Marine Court that, "It was the worst sea he ever saw. The seas came from three directions, met in a pinnacle, and exploded like a cannon."

== Wreck identification ==
In 2022 a wreck was found and it was in September 2023 that it was positively identified by a surveying vessel looking for lost shipping containers. The Department of Planning & Environment announced the identification to the public in February 2024.

In June 2025, some divers undertook a deep dive to survey the wreck. Unusually for the wreck of a ship which foundered, both the bow and stern parts of her hull had collapsed, suggesting that the ship broke apart before it sank.

The wreck is located around 26 km off Port Kembla, in 160 m of water.
