= Nemesis Sub-Terra =

Drop tower ride at Alton Towers

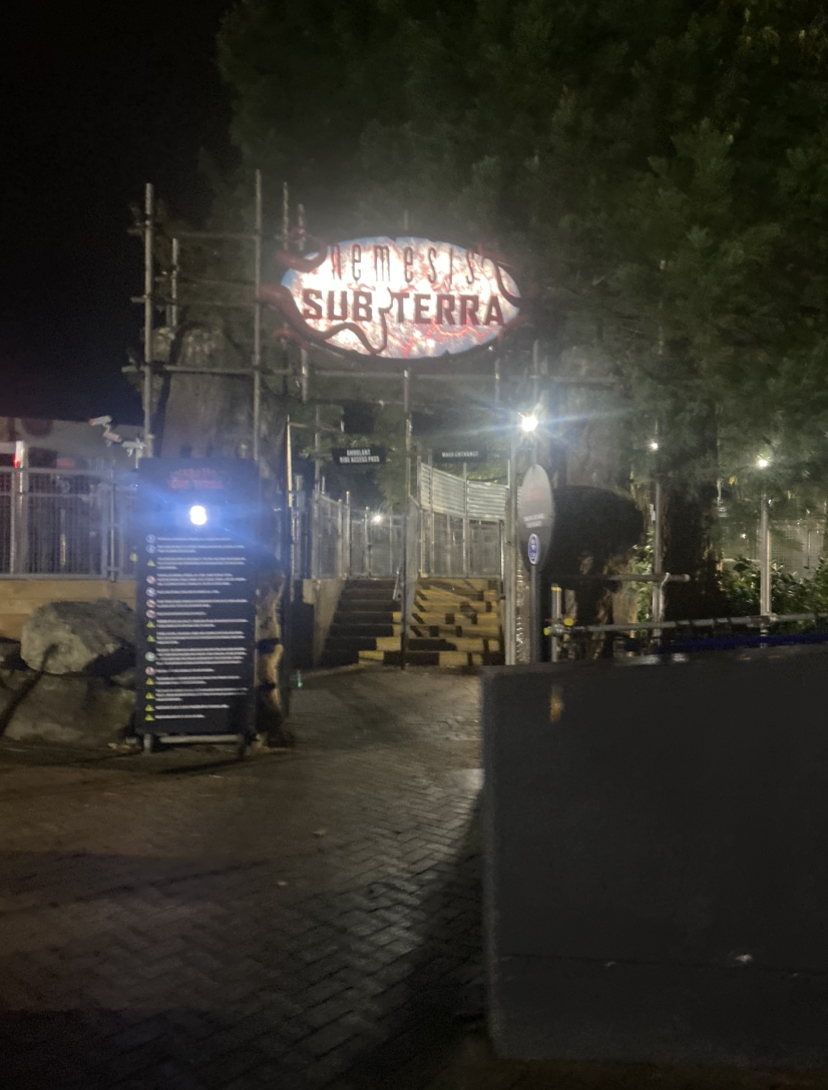

Alton Towers
- Area: Forbidden Valley
- Coordinates: 52°59′15″N 1°53′03″W
- Status: Operating
- Cost: £4,500,000
- Opening date: March 24, 2012 (original); May 27, 2023 (re-opening)
- Closing date: August 7, 2015 (original)
- Replaced: Dynamo

Ride statistics
- Attraction type: Haunted attraction, drop tower, dark ride
- Manufacturer: ABC Rides
- Model: Freefall tower
- Drop: 6 m (20 ft)
- Speed: 43 mph (69 km/h)
- G-force: 4.5 g
- Capacity: 400 riders per hour
- Riders per row: 10
- Duration: 6 minutes
- Height restriction: 140 cm (4 ft 7 in)
- Ride vehicles: 4
- Rows per vehicle: 1

Nemesis Sub-Terra is a haunted drop tower dark ride located at Alton Towers theme park in Staffordshire, United Kingdom. The ride opened to the public on 24 March 2012. Its theme is focused on the discovery of a nest of eggs in a network of caves, an extension of the theme and concept of the park's Nemesis Reborn roller coaster that opened in 1994.

After several years of operation, the ride closed abruptly in 2015 following a serious incident on The Smiler. Nemesis Sub-Terra, along with six other rides, remained closed the following season as the park transitioned into limited operation. Alton Towers later removed the attraction from its website in 2019, indicating it might be closed permanently. Following months of speculation in 2023, the park revealed that the ride was being refurbished, and it reopened on 27 May 2023. Before the ride reopened, the area was used as a viewing area for the Nemesis Reborn refurbishment.

== History ==
Plans for a new indoor drop tower ride were submitted in August 2011. Codenamed the Catacomb Project, construction began in September 2011 in the Forbidden Valley section of the park near the Nemesis and Air roller coasters (Air was renamed Galactica in 2016). Both the Body Zorb and Lava Lump rock-climbing wall attractions were removed to clear space. ABC Rides of Switzerland was hired to construct the ride, which would drop two stories underground and be based on their prototype Vertical Dark Ride concept. A similar drop tower ride opened as Extremis: Drop Ride to Doom at London Dungeon in 2007.

Alton Towers marketed the ride as a horror experience, dropping subtle clues in an online campaign and installing heartrate monitors at the exit as a promotional stunt. The park billed the ride as "your worst nightmare underground", and it received a 12A rating from the British Board of Film Classification (BBFC), meaning children under the age of 12 would need to be accompanied by an adult. The concept art released depicted "blood-red tentacles and a bulging serpent's eyeball of the ancient malevolent creature emerging from a volcanic terrain" according to the Los Angeles Times. Jack Osbourne, son of Ozzy Osbourne, was appointed Director of Fear for the attraction as an additional publicity stunt.

In February 2012, Alton Towers released a promotional video of a bottomless lift, a hint about the upcoming ride. Nemesis: Sub-Terra opened to the public the following month on 24 March 2012. Themed as an extension of the Nemesis narrative involving an alien creature that emerged after being buried for two million years, the new ride was named Nemesis: Sub-Terra. The backstory involves a shady organization known as The Phalanx, who discovered a nest egg underground that was believed to belong to Nemesis. The venue housing the ride is painted a military green, complete with staff dressing the part in military uniforms.

The ride was tweaked after significant negative feedback from the general public. The changes to the ride were believed to have been implemented during the park's closure due to high winds on 4 April. However, this was not the case, as the entire site, plus other nearby attractions, was deemed unsafe because of the high winds and proximity to large trees, and the attraction was improved during planned maintenance sessions before and after the theme-parks normal public opening hours. Various trees were felled and cut back during the following weeks to improve safety in future bad weather.

From 20 May 2012 the attraction closed for a period of six days in order to make improvements. Alton Towers Operations and Developments Director Mark Kerrigan revealed that the ride has yet to be officially completed by the park.

=== Extended closure and reopening ===
In November 2015, as part of the downsizing of the theme park's operation in response to the Smiler incident earlier that year, Alton Towers announced that six of its attractions would not reopen the following season, including Nemesis Sub-Terra. The ride was eventually removed from the park's website before the start of the 2019 season, which indicated the ride’s indefinite closure.

During its closure in 2018 and 2019, the Sub Terra building hosted the scare attraction Project 42 for Scarefest, the park's annual Halloween event. The attraction made use of most of the interior of the original attraction and was themed around a viral outbreak, where test subjects had developed animalistic qualities.

Following months of speculation, the ride reopened on 27 May 2023.

== Ride description ==
Phalanx operatives split 40 riders into 4 groups to watch a pre-show video, which outlines the story of how one of the Nemesis creature's eggs has been made safe for viewing by the public. Riders then move into two fake lifts, with effects mimicking descending underground.

The lift door opens to reveal a rock cavern, opening into the main ride chamber. Four rows of ten seats face the nemesis egg and riders are ushered into the seats by actors.

Details of the alien egg are played on screen. Midway through effects mimic a power failure. The lights are restored to reveal that the egg has hatched. Riders drop around 20 feet (6 metres) to the bottom of the chamber where lights show more eggs. The riders ascend to the main level whilst rapid light flashes occur and water is sprayed at riders whilst more sound effects are played. 'Back pokers' 'leg ticklers' and bursts of air surprise riders.

Sirens sound, and evacuation notices play, as actors usher riders to exit via 2 fake lifts. The lift begins to mimic ascent, but the lights turn off and the lift shakes and bangs although being attacked. Once the lift doors open riders exit through a decontamination zone.
