= Nemesis Inferno =

Steel inverted roller coaster

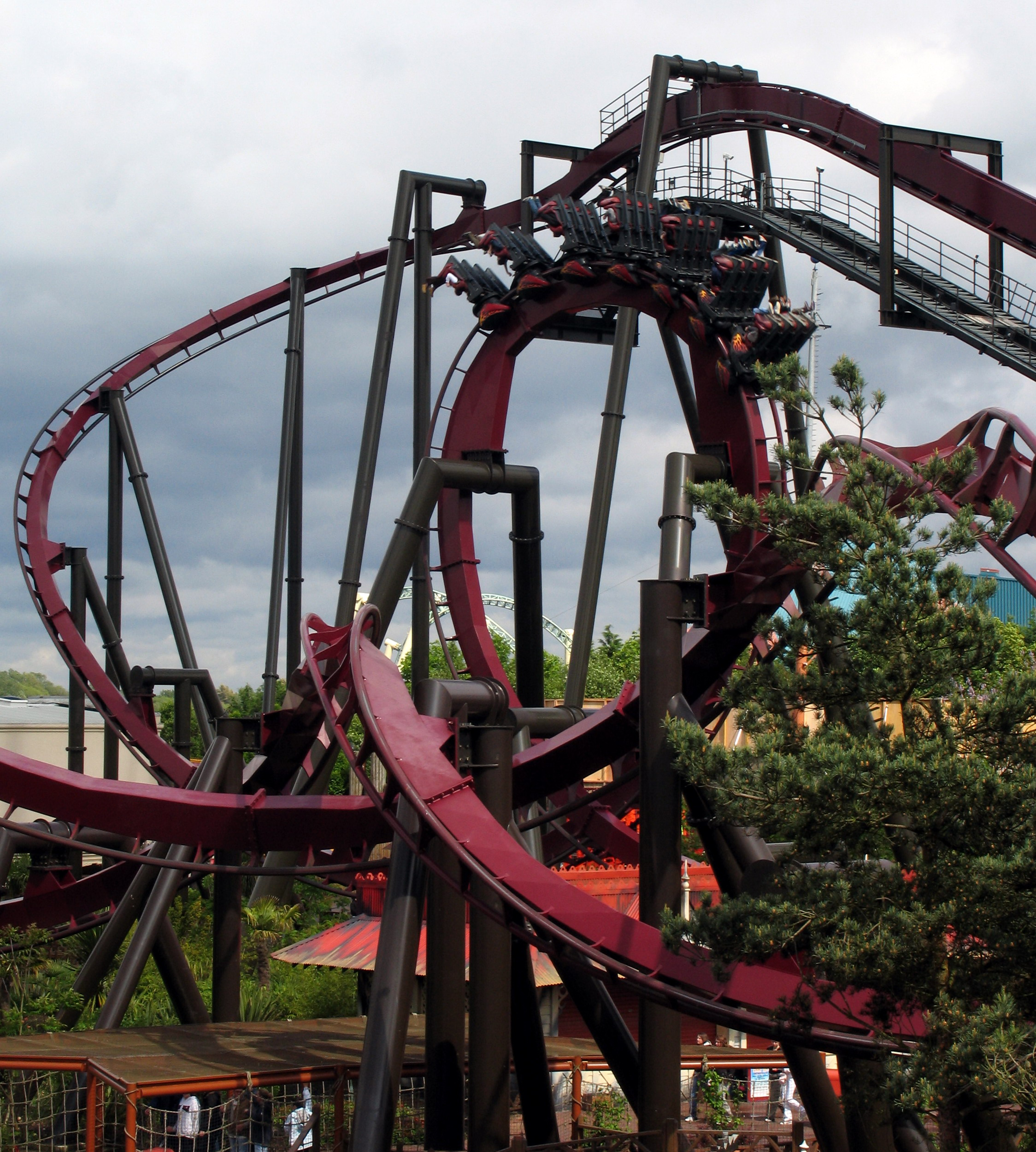
- One of Nemesis Inferno's trains navigating the vertical loop.

Thorpe Park
- Location: Thorpe Park
- Park section: The Jungle
- Coordinates: 51.403476°N 0.516408°W
- Status: Operating
- Opening date: 5 April 2003
- Cost: £8 million
- Replaced: Mr. Rabbit's Tropical Travels

General statistics
- Type: Steel – Inverted
- Manufacturer: Bolliger & Mabillard
- Designer: Werner Stengel & Jordan Forster
- Model: Inverted Coaster – Custom
- Lift/launch system: Chain lift hill
- Height: 29 m (95 ft)
- Drop: 28 m (92 ft)
- Length: 750 m (2,460 ft)
- Speed: 50 mph (80 km/h)
- Inversions: 4
- Duration: 1:43
- Capacity: 1,150 riders per hour
- G-force: 4.5
- Height restriction: 140 cm (4 ft 7 in)
- Trains: 2 trains with 7 cars; riders arranged 4 across in a single row for a total of 28 riders per train
- Fastrack available
- Wheelchair accessible
- Nemesis Inferno at RCDB

Nemesis Inferno is a steel inverted roller coaster located at Thorpe Park in Surrey, England. The ride was manufactured by Bolliger & Mabillard.

The 750-metre-long (2,460 ft) Nemesis Inferno is themed around an erupting tropical volcano. The ride stands 29 metres (95 ft) tall, features a top speed of 50 miles per hour (80 km/h), and four inversions.

== History ==
In 2002, after the opening of Colossus, Thorpe Park officially announced the addition of Nemesis Inferno in 2003. The coaster was designed by Werner Stengel for B&M.

Construction took place throughout 2002 with the first test run being completed in December 2002. Nemesis Inferno officially opened to the public on 5 April 2003. According to Nikki Nolan of The Tussauds Group who operated the park at the time, the ride was installed just one year after Colossus to "help transform Thorpe Park into a real thrill park".

In 2004, Thorpe Park approached Guinness World Records to set the record for the "Most Naked People on a Rollercoaster". In May 2004, 81 students took part in the record, which was set at 28 – the number of seats on a single Nemesis Inferno train. In August 2004, Nemesis at Alton Towers broke the record with 32 riders.

The roller coaster was featured in an episode of the British sitcom The Inbetweeners, titled "Thorpe Park", that originally aired on 8 May 2008.

== Characteristics ==
The 750-metre-long (2,460 ft) Nemesis Inferno stands 29 metres (95 ft) tall. With a top speed of 80 kilometres per hour (50 mph), the ride features four inversions including a vertical loop, a zero-g roll, and a set of interlocking corkscrews. Riders of Nemesis Inferno experience up to 4.5 times the force of gravity on the near-two-minute ride. The ride is reported to have cost £8 million.

Nemesis Inferno operates with two steel and fiberglass trains, each containing seven cars. Each car seats four riders in a single row for a total of 28 riders per train. Two seats on Nemesis Inferno have been modified to cater for larger riders.

The ride is themed around an erupting volcano. The name of the ride suggests that it is related to the original Nemesis, an inverted coaster installed at Alton Towers in 1994.

== Ride experience ==
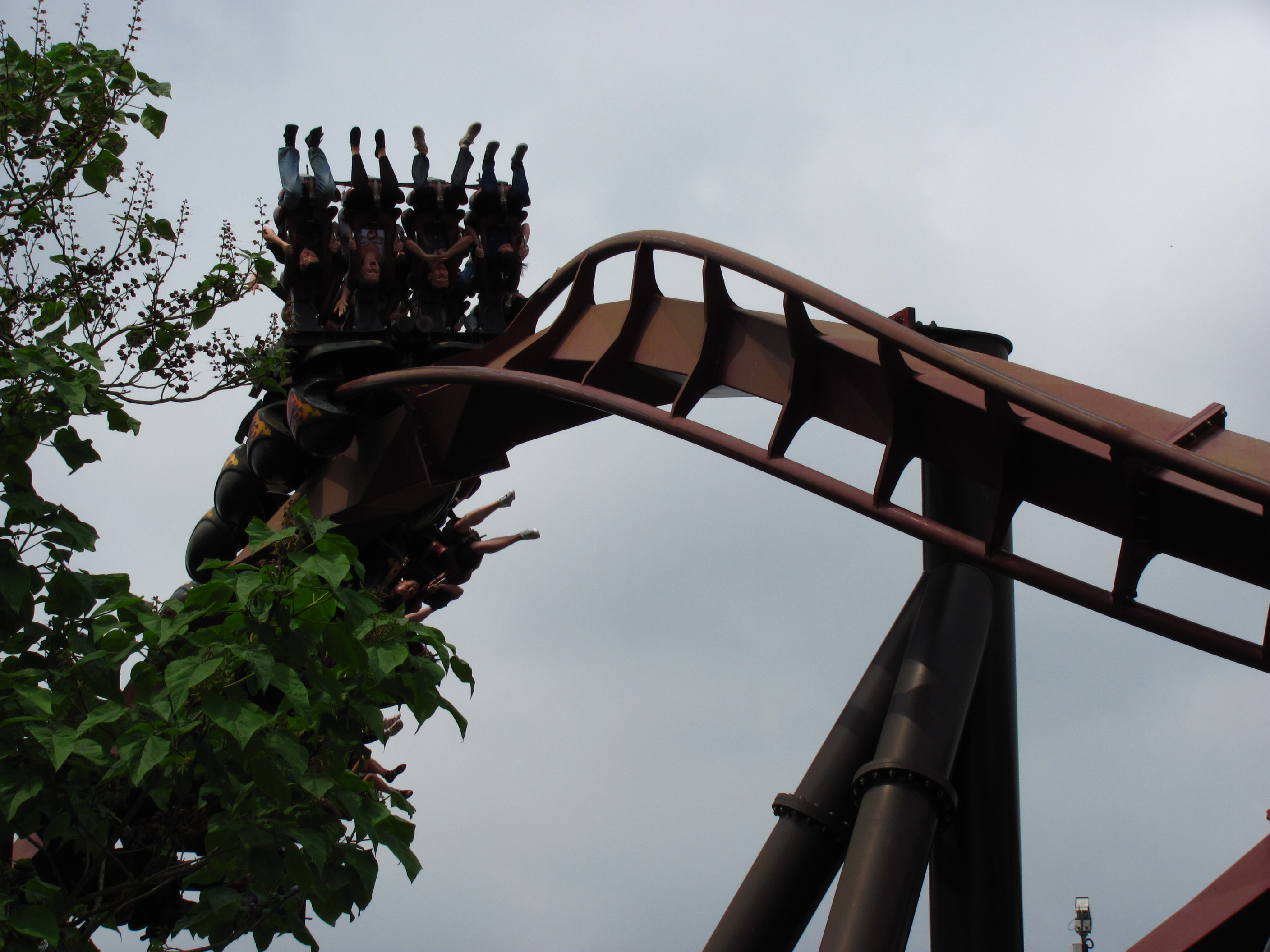
A train going through one of the interlocking corkscrews

After leaving the station, the train descends a right-hand swooping drop into a tunnel, where riders are exposed to simulated fire effects. The train then makes a brief left turn before ascending the 29-metre-tall (95 ft) chain lift hill. At the top, it descends in a long left-hand swing into its first inversion, a vertical loop, the train then rises into the second inversion, a zero-G roll. The ride continues with a right-hand turn into the first of two interlocking corkscrews, followed by a right-handed overbanked turn, and then passes through the second interlocking corkscrew. After a large right-hand helix and a sharp left-hand upward turn, the train enters the final brake run. A small right-hand turn then guides the train back into the station.

== Reception ==
In Mitch Hawker's worldwide Best Roller Coaster Poll, Nemesis Inferno entered at position 70 in 2003, before peaking at 51 in 2006. The ride's ranking in subsequent polls is shown in the table below.

Mitch Hawker's Best Roller Coaster Poll: Best Steel-Tracked Roller Coaster
Year	2003	2004	2005	2006	2007	2008	2009	2010	2011	2012	2013
Ranking	70	55	63	51	60	61	88	94	(Note: No steel roller coaster poll was held in 2011.)	123	138

Nemesis Inferno is commonly compared with its Alton Towers counterpart, Nemesis, with many citing the latter as the superior ride. Nemesis has ranked favourably in Amusement Today's annual Golden Ticket Awards, being one of only seven roller coasters to appear in the top 50 steel roller coasters for all 15 years. Nemesis Inferno, on the other hand, has never made an appearance. In Mitch Hawker's worldwide Best Roller Coaster Poll, Nemesis Inferno has averaged a ranking of 80, compared to Nemesis, which has averaged a ranking of 6. In a poll conducted by the Los Angeles Times, Nemesis received 37.93% of the vote for title of best roller coaster in England, while Nemesis Inferno received 0.32%. Jeremy Thompson of Roller Coaster Philosophy describes Nemesis as "a vastly superior ride" to Nemesis Inferno. Thompson describes Nemesis Inferno as "something a bit better" than his expectations; however, he was "not sure if it was a particularly good ride or not".
