= Himeji Central Park =

Safari park in Himeji, Hyōgo, Japan

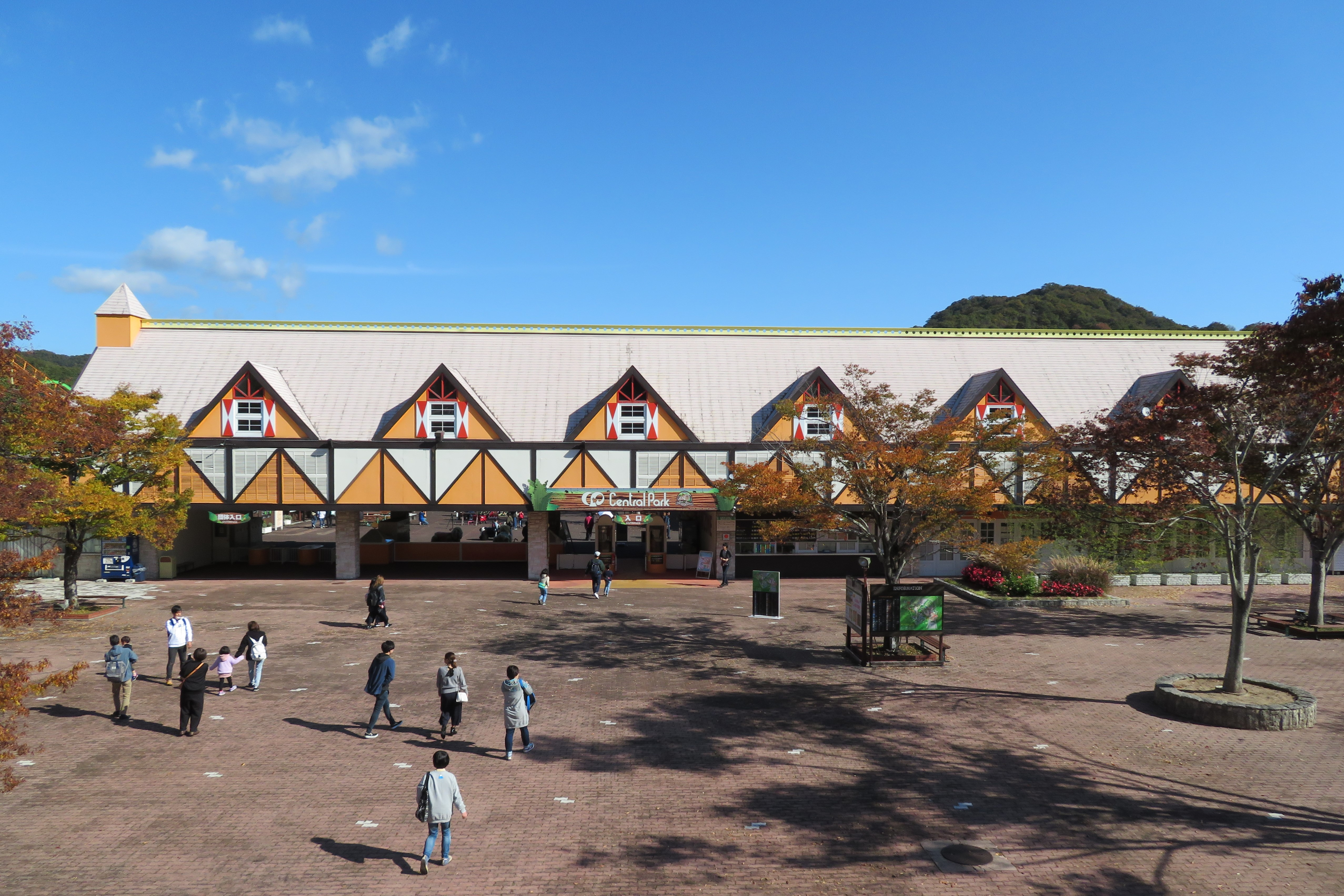
- Entrance to Himeji Central Park
- Interactive map of Himeji Central Park
- 34.867746°N 134.752064°E
- Date opened: March 1984
- Location: Himeji, Hyōgo, Japan
- Land area: 190 hectares (470 acres)
- No. of animals: 1200
- No. of species: 190
- Annual visitors: 567,000 (2019)

The Himeji Central Park (姫路セントラルパーク, Himeji Sentoraru Pāku) is a safari park in Himeji, Hyōgo, Japan. The park opened in March 1984, and is the only safari park in Kansai region. It has a "sister park" agreement with Nairobi National Park, Kenya. The park also incorporates an amusement park. It is operated by Himeji Park Management (姫路パークマネジメント, Himeji Pāku Manejimento), a Kamori Kankō Group company.

== Safari park ==
- Drive-through safari
  - Cheetah section
  - Lion section
  - Tiger section
  - Herbivore section A: Somali giraffes, sitatungas, etc.
  - Herbivore section B: Himalayan tahrs, bharals, etc.
  - Herbivore section C: hippopotamuses, American bisons, etc.
  - Zebra section: Grevy's zebras, etc.
  - Larger herbivore section: White rhinoceroses, African bush elephants, etc.
- Walking safari
  - Child's farm
  - Walking Avenue: white lions, white tigers, etc.
  - Kangaroo park
  - 1st flying cage
  - 2nd flying cage
  - Bear park
  - Monkey mountain
  - Elephant kingdom
  - Sky safari

== Amusement park ==
- Aquaria: Swimming pool, summer season only
- Buster Bomb
- Diavlo
- Free fall
- Giant Peter: Ferris wheel
- Go! Go! Jet
- Hurricane
- Ice park: Ice rink, winter season only
- Imorinth
- Labyrinth
- Venus GP
- and others

== Sky safari ==
There is an aerial lift inside the safari park called Sky Safari (スカイサファリ, Sukai Safari). Opened in 2003, this is the only aerial lift in Japan that was built to watch animals. Three cabins are attached to transport more passengers at once.

=== Basic data ===
- System: Gondola lift, 1 cable
- Distance: 317 m (1,040 ft)
- Vertical interval: 41 m (135 ft)
- Operational speed: 4.0 m/s
- Passenger capacity per a cabin: 12
  - 36 per 3 cabins.
- Cabins: 2 groups of 3 cabins
- Stations: 2
- Duration of one-way trip: 3 minutes
