= Tsurui Station =

Railway station in Ichikawa, Hyōgo Prefecture, Japan

Tsurui Station 鶴居駅
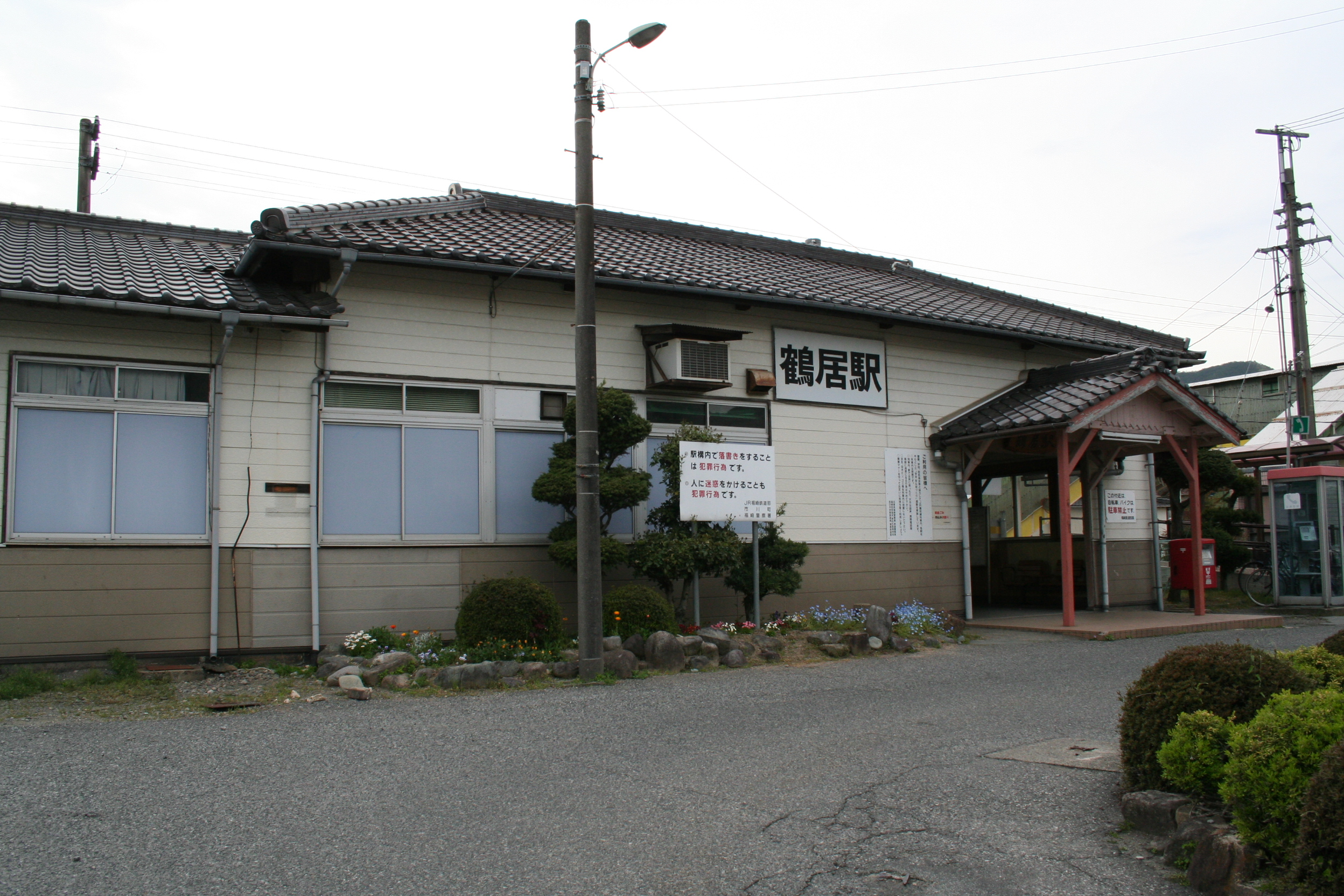
- Tsurui Station building in April 2009

General information
- Location: 27 Tsurui, Ichikawa-chō, Kanzaki-gun, Hyōgo-ken 679-2334; Japan
- Coordinates: 35°01′25″N 134°45′17″E
- Owner: West Japan Railway Company
- Operator: West Japan Railway Company
- Line: Bantan Line
- Distance: 24.5 km (15.2 miles) from Himeji
- Platforms: 2 side platforms
- Connections: Bus stop

Other information
- Status: Unstaffed
- Website: Official website

History
- Opened: 26 July 1894

Passengers
- FY2016: 241 daily
Location
- Location within Hyōgo Prefecture Location within Japan

Tsurui Station (鶴居駅, Tsurui-eki) is a passenger railway station located in the town of Ichikawa, Kanzaki District, Hyōgo Prefecture, Japan, operated by West Japan Railway Company (JR West).

== Lines ==
Tsurui Station is served by the Bantan Line, and is located 24.5 kilometers from the terminus of the line at Himeji.

== Station layout ==
The station consists of two opposed side platforms connected to the station building by a footbridge. The station is unattended.

=== Platforms ===
1	■ Bantan Line	for Fukusaki and Himeji
2	■ Bantan Line	for Teramae, Wadayama

== Adjacent stations ==
«	Service	»
West Japan Railway Company
Bantan Line
Limited Express Hamakaze: Does not stop at this station
Amaji	Local	Niino

== History ==
Tsurui Station opened on July 26, 1894. With the privatization of the Japan National Railways (JNR) on April 1, 1987, the station came under the aegis of the West Japan Railway Company.

== Passenger statistics ==
In fiscal 2016, the station was used by an average of 241 passengers daily.

== Surrounding area ==
- Ichikawa Municipal Tsurui Elementary School

== See also ==
- List of railway stations in Japan
