= Ichikawa, Hyōgo =

Ichikawa 市川町
- Town
- Ichikawa Town
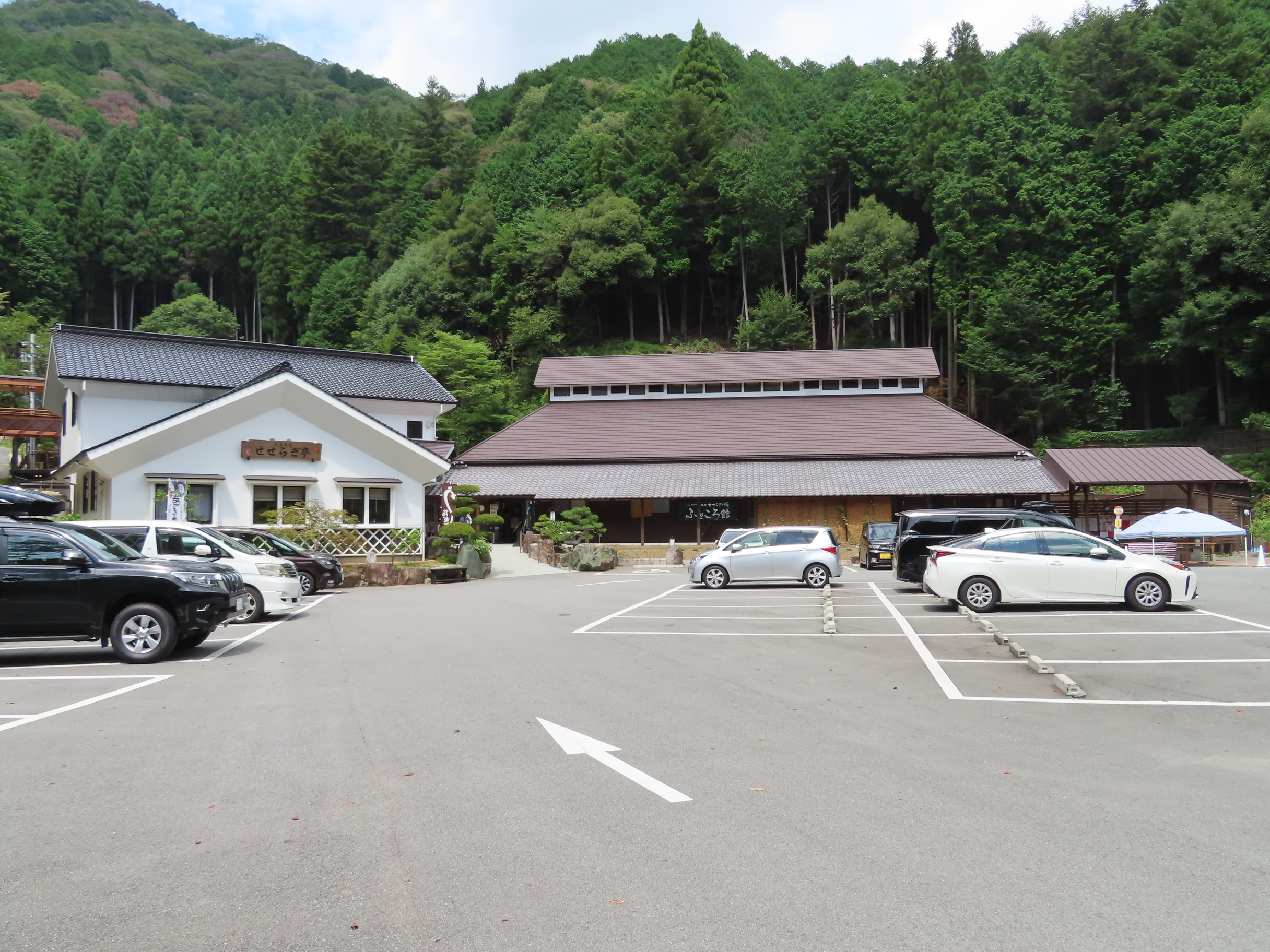
- Kasagata Onsen Seseragi-no-Yu

- Flag Emblem

- Location of Ichikawa in Hyōgo Prefecture
- Interactive map of Ichikawa
- Location within Japan Location within Hyōgo Prefecture
- Coordinates: 34°59′N 134°46′E
- Country: Japan
- Region: Kansai
- Prefecture: Hyōgo
- District: Kanzaki
- Municipal status: 1 April 1955

Government
  - Mayor: Yoshikazu Tsuda
  - Deputy mayor: Tetsuya Obana

Area
  - Total: 82.67 km^{2} (31.92 sq mi)

Population (1 April 2025)
  - Total: 9,916
  - Density: 119.9/km^{2} (310.7/sq mi)
- Time zone: UTC+09:00 (JST)
- Postcode: 679-2392
- Town hall address: 165-3 Nishikawanabe, Ichikawa-chō, Kanzaki-gun, Hyōgo-ken 679-2392
- Website: www.town.ichikawa.lg.jp
- Symbols
- Flower: Sunflower
- Tree: Castanopsis

Ichikawa (市川町, Ichikawa-chō) is a town located in the central part of Kanzaki District, Hyōgo Prefecture, Japan. Approximately three-quarters of its total area is mountainous, with flat land spreading along the Ichikawa River, which flows north to south through the centre of the town. It falls under the jurisdiction of the Naka-Harima Prefectural Citizens Centre.

== Overview ==
Located roughly in the central part of Hyōgo Prefecture, this town is a naturally rich area in which forests account for most of its land area. It developed along the basin of the Class 2 river Ichikawa River, which flows through the town, and has a history as an important industrial hub, once connected by the Silver Cart Road (Gin-no-Bashamichi).

Today, transport infrastructure such as the Bantan Renraku Road and the JR Bantan Line is well developed, making it a highly convenient area for commuting and schooling to Himeji and the wider Keihanshin region.

From an industrial perspective, it is known as the birthplace in Japan of domestically produced golf iron heads, and manufacturing centred on forging technology has been passed down. In recent years, against the backdrop of strong transport convenience, e-commerce-related businesses and logistics hubs have increasingly located in the area, and, alongside traditional manufacturing, new employment opportunities have emerged.

Furthermore, the area is also engaged in tourism initiatives, including the development of natural hot spring facilities such as Kasagata Onsen Seseragi-no-Yu, and the promotion of tourism that makes use of natural assets such as Mount Kasagata, thereby also serving as a place of recreation and exchange for visitors from urban areas.

In the field of education, school consolidation within the town has been advanced in response to declining birth rates, leading to the reorganisation of the educational environment. While placing importance on local community ties, efforts are being made to form a sustainable local society by harmonising traditional industries with new industries.

== Geography ==
Located slightly to the south-west of the central part of Hyōgo Prefecture, the town lies in the central area of Kanzaki District. It extends approximately 13 km (8.1 mi) from east to west and about 10 km (6.2 mi) from north to south, and its municipal boundary is said to have a heart-like shape. It is situated within a mountainous and hilly region, with terrain surrounded by mountains. Of the total area of 82.67 km^{2} (31.92 sq mi), only 19.97 km^{2} (7.71 sq mi) (24.2%) is habitable land, and flat terrain is largely limited to the basin of the Ichikawa River, which flows roughly north–south through the centre of the town.

=== Mountains ===
The most representative mountain within the town's area is Mount Kasagata (939 m (3,081 ft)), which spans the three municipalities of Kamikawa, Taka, and Ichikawa. It is a conical mountain known as the "Harima Fuji", and is counted among the 100 Famous Mountains of Kansai and the 50 Local Hyōgo Mountains. The summit lies on the boundary between Kamikawa and Taka, while the southern part of its slopes extends into Ichikawa. The eastern area falls within the Kasagatayama-Sengamine Prefectural Natural Park.

At the foot of Mount Kasagata are Kasagata Shrine and Kasagata Temple, which are traditionally said to have been founded by the Buddhist ascetic Hōdō Sennin. The mountain area is known as the northernmost habitat of the Koyasu tree and as a growing site for rare plants such as Seppiko-tennanshō, and it also preserves caves and unusual rock formations believed to be remains of Shugendō practice.

Near the border with Fukusaki to the south lies Mount Kanzaki (333 m (1,093 ft)), which spans Fukusaki and Ichikawa. The Harima Province Fudoki records that Takeihashiki-no-Mikoto resided on Mount Kanzaki, and that the district was named Kanzaki because a deity was believed to dwell there. This Mount Kanzaki mentioned in the Fudoki is identified with the mountain area of present-day Yamazaki in Fukusaki.

=== Rivers ===
The main river flowing through the town is the Ichikawa (Ichikawa River system), a Class 2 river and one of the Harima Five Rivers. The Ichikawa flows from north to south, and is joined by tributaries such as the Kōra River, Furiko River, Oichi River, Obata River, and Okabe River. All of these are designated Class 2 rivers under the management of the Governor of Hyōgo Prefecture. Downstream, the river flows through Himeji and eventually into the Harima Sea.

=== Agricultural land ===
Agricultural land, which forms the basis of the primary sector, is distributed in a belt-like pattern along the Ichikawa River and its tributaries, forming a rural landscape. Rice cultivation is the main agricultural activity, supported by fertile soil and abundant water resources. In the eastern area at the foot of Mount Kasagata, organic farming is also widely practised. The average cultivated land area per farming household is small at 54.2 a (0.542 ha), and alongside designated agricultural zones, the conservation of rural environments such as satoyama and irrigation ponds remains an ongoing issue.

=== Neighbouring municipalities ===
Hyōgo Prefecture

- Himeji
- Kasai
- Kanzaki District: Fukusaki, Kamikawa
- Taka District: Taka

== Local areas ==
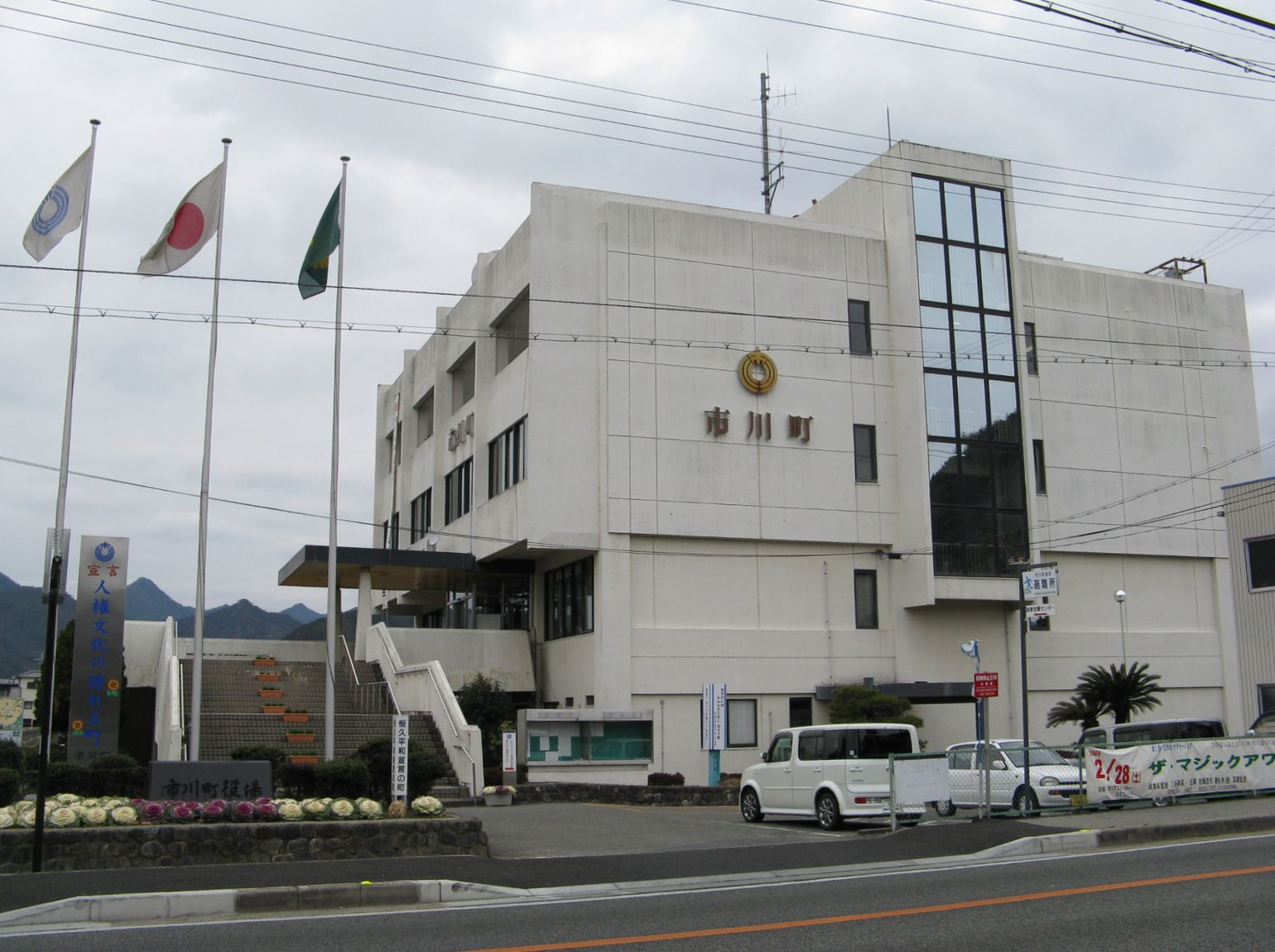
Ichikawa Town Hall (Nishikawanabe)

The 26 oaza within the town are divided into four districts under the Regional Agricultural Management Base Strengthening Promotion Plan, based on the Act on the Promotion of Strengthening of Agricultural Management Bases. The town centre is located in the Kawanabe district along the Ichikawa River. The Bantan Renraku Road passes via the Ichikawa South Interchange and Ichikawa North Interchange (both in the Kawanabe district), and JR West's Bantan Line includes Amaji Station (Amaji district) and Tsurui Station (Tsurui district) within the town. The distribution of each oaza is as follows:

Kawanabe district
Nishikawanabe, Asano, Obata, Higashikawanabe, Nishitanaka, Kitatanaka, Uedanaka, Hoki
Seka district
Shimoseka, Kamiseka, Shimoushio, Kamiushio
Amaji district
Amaji, Chikara, Kodani, Chihara, Tani, Oku, Sakado
Tsurui district
Sawa, Misa, Tsurui, Kanzaki, Tanaka, Komuro, Yakata

=== Oaza (named localities) ===
The list below shows the town's official named localities (oaza), in ascending order of postal code. In Japan, an oaza is a named locality used in official addresses; it is larger than a chōme or aza (smaller address subdivisions) and corresponds to the traditional large village sections used in rural municipalities.

==== Kawanabe district ====
This district corresponds to the area of the former Kawanabe Village. Many of the town hall, cultural, and sports facilities are concentrated here, and the district forms flat land along the Ichikawa River.

Postal code	Locality (oaza)
679-2311	Uedanaka
679-2312	Hoki
679-2313	Nishitanaka
679-2314	Kitatanaka
679-2315	Nishikawanabe
679-2316	Higashikawanabe
679-2317	Asano
679-2318	Obata

==== Seka district ====
This district corresponds to the area of the former Seka Village. At the foot of Mount Kasagata, facilities include Kasagata Onsen Seseragi-no-Yu (Kamiushio), and settlements are scattered through mountainous and valley terrain.

Postal code	Locality (oaza)
679-2301	Kamiushio
679-2302	Shimoushio
679-2303	Kamiseka
679-2304	Shimoseka

==== Amaji district ====
This district corresponds to the area of the former Amaji Village. It includes Amaji Station on the Bantan Line, and lies on the western side of the town. In the temple-front area of Sekishoji in Amaji, there is a spring known as “Amaji no Shimizu”.

Postal code	Locality (oaza)
679-2321	Chihara
679-2322	Kodani
679-2323	Amaji
679-2324	Sakado
679-2325	Oku
679-2326	Tani
679-2327	Chikara

==== Tsurui district ====
In addition to the area of the former Tsurui Village, this district includes Yakata (former Yakata Village). It extends across the northern part of the town and includes Tsurui Station on the Bantan Line.

Postal code	Locality (oaza)
679-2331	Komuro
679-2332	Tanaka
679-2333	Kanzaki
679-2334	Tsurui
679-2335	Misa
679-2336	Sawa
679-2337	Yakata

== Population ==
At the time of the Reiwa 2 (2020) population census, the nighttime population (residents) was 11,231; however, outflow due to commuting and schooling to areas outside the town, including Himeji, is substantial, and the daytime population was 9,850, with the daytime population equal to 0.877 times the nighttime population (day–night population ratio of 87.7 per cent). When the population change from the previous survey is examined in the Reiwa 7 (2025) population census (compared with Reiwa 2), the population was 9,916, a decrease of 11.71 per cent; the rate of change ranked 40th among the 41 municipalities in the prefecture and 48th among the 49 administrative areas. In the census of the same year, there were 4,324 households, with 2.60 persons per household. The population structure comprised 10.0 per cent young population, 52.6 per cent working-age population, and 37.4 per cent elderly population, indicating advancing population ageing. The population of children under the age of 18 was 1,432; among households with children under the age of six, three-generation and similar households accounted for 28.3 per cent, a proportion higher than the averages for Hyōgo Prefecture and the national average.

Left: age distribution of Ichikawa and Japan (2005). Right: age distribution of Ichikawa by sex (2005).
Source: Statistics Bureau of Japan, 2005 National Census

Population change in Ichikawa (corresponding area)

Year	Pop.	±% p.a.
1970	14,686	—
1975	14,915	+0.31%
1980	15,230	+0.42%
1985	15,354	+0.16%
1990	15,105	−0.33%
1995	15,060	−0.06%

Year	Pop.	±% p.a.
2000	14,812	−0.33%
2005	14,150	−0.91%
2010	13,288	−1.25%
2015	12,300	−1.53%
2020	11,231	−1.80%

Source: Statistics Bureau of Japan, national census.

== Climate ==
Whilst influenced by a Seto Inland Sea climate, Ichikawa also has inland characteristics owing to the surrounding mountains. The Japan Meteorological Agency operates no surface meteorological observation stations or AMeDAS sites within Ichikawa; within Kanzaki District, the only reference observation point is the Fukusaki AMeDAS station in Fukusaki, the municipality immediately to the south, at an elevation of 72 m (236 ft). The figures below are taken from that station and are cited as climatic indicators for Ichikawa.

The mean annual temperature is 15.1 °C (59.2 °F), annual precipitation is 1,445.0 mm (56.89 in), and annual sunshine duration is 1,929.9 hours (all 1991–2020 climatological normals). Precipitation is heavy during the rainy season (June–July); it decreases somewhat from August onwards, but September remains high at around 190 mm (7.5 in). In winter, daily minimum temperatures often fall below 0 °C (32 °F).

Notable historical extremes at Fukusaki AMeDAS
Element	Value	Date
Daily maximum temperature	39.1 °C (102.4 °F)	30 July 2025
Daily minimum temperature	−7.8 °C (18.0 °F)	3 February 1996

Climate data for Fukusaki AMeDAS (Fukusaki-shin, Fukusaki, at 72 m (236 ft)) The only meteorological observation site in Kanzaki District; cited here for Ichikawa because no observation station is located within the town
Month	Jan	Feb	Mar	Apr	May	Jun	Jul	Aug	Sep	Oct	Nov	Dec	Year
Record high °C (°F)	17.2 (63.0)	22.3 (72.1)	25.4 (77.7)	30.0 (86.0)	32.9 (91.2)	36.4 (97.5)	39.1 (102.4)	38.9 (102.0)	37.3 (99.1)	32.5 (90.5)	27.0 (80.6)	21.9 (71.4)	39.1 (102.4)
Mean daily maximum °C (°F)	8.8 (47.8)	9.8 (49.6)	13.7 (56.7)	19.6 (67.3)	24.7 (76.5)	27.8 (82.0)	31.5 (88.7)	33.2 (91.8)	28.9 (84.0)	23.1 (73.6)	17.0 (62.6)	11.2 (52.2)	20.7 (69.3)
Daily mean °C (°F)	3.6 (38.5)	4.4 (39.9)	7.8 (46.0)	13.3 (55.9)	18.4 (65.1)	22.4 (72.3)	26.3 (79.3)	27.4 (81.3)	23.5 (74.3)	17.5 (63.5)	11.3 (52.3)	5.8 (42.4)	15.1 (59.2)
Mean daily minimum °C (°F)	−0.6 (30.9)	−0.3 (31.5)	2.5 (36.5)	7.5 (45.5)	12.8 (55.0)	18.0 (64.4)	22.5 (72.5)	23.4 (74.1)	19.3 (66.7)	12.9 (55.2)	6.6 (43.9)	1.5 (34.7)	10.5 (50.9)
Record low °C (°F)	−7.7 (18.1)	−7.8 (18.0)	−5.6 (21.9)	−2.1 (28.2)	2.2 (36.0)	7.6 (45.7)	15.0 (59.0)	15.7 (60.3)	8.6 (47.5)	2.5 (36.5)	−2.6 (27.3)	−6.2 (20.8)	−7.8 (18.0)
Average precipitation mm (inches)	42.2 (1.66)	56.5 (2.22)	107.1 (4.22)	128.2 (5.05)	154.4 (6.08)	182.9 (7.20)	207.3 (8.16)	132.5 (5.22)	188.8 (7.43)	117.5 (4.63)	72.3 (2.85)	55.3 (2.18)	1,445 (56.89)
Average precipitation days (≥ 1.0 mm)	5.4	6.8	9.4	9.4	10.0	11.5	11.4	8.2	10.3	8.0	6.3	6.3	103.0
Mean monthly sunshine hours	141.6	134.6	170.0	187.7	192.7	142.1	150.3	195.6	152.5	165.2	149.4	148.3	1,929.9
Source: Japan Meteorological Agency (normals: 1991–2020; extremes: 1977–present)

Kanzaki District – Fukusaki AMeDAS

Climate chart (precipitation, max. and min. temperature)
J	F	M	A	M	J	J	A	S	O	N	D
42 9 −1	57 10 0	107 14 3	128 20 8	154 25 13	183 28 18	207 32 23	133 33 23	189 29 19	118 23 13	72 17 7	55 11 2
- █ Average max. and min. temperatures in °C
- █ Precipitation totals in mm
- Source: Japan Meteorological Agency (1991–2020 climatological normals)
Imperial conversion
J	F	M	A	M	J	J	A	S	O	N	D
1.7 48 31	2.2 50 31	4.2 57 37	5 67 46	6.1 76 55	7.2 82 64	8.2 89 73	5.2 92 74	7.4 84 67	4.6 74 55	2.8 63 44	2.2 52 35
- █ Average max. and min. temperatures in °F
- █ Precipitation totals in inches

Climatological normals for Fukusaki AMeDAS, the only observation point in Kanzaki District (there is no Japan Meteorological Agency station within Ichikawa).

== Disaster prevention ==
Much of the town's area is designated as flood inundation hazard zones and landslide disaster warning zones. The main risks are regarded as shaking from the Yamazaki Fault Zone and the Goshodani Fault Zone in the event of an Earthquake, together with flood and wind disasters and landslides caused by heavy rainfall and typhoons. In March 2021 (Reiwa 3), the town revised the Ichikawa Town Regional Disaster Prevention Plan, setting out measures from disaster prevention through to recovery. In April 2026 (Reiwa 8), it also formulated the Ichikawa Town Resilience Plan as a regional plan under the National Land Resilience programme.

For disaster information dissemination, in November 2021 (Reiwa 3) the town concluded an agreement with Yahoo on the provision of information during disasters. This includes directing users via Yahoo! JAPAN to cache sites and distributing emergency information from the municipality through the Yahoo! Bosai Sokuhō app. Household receivers for the disaster prevention administrative radio system are lent free of charge, one per household. Public wireless LAN has also been installed at municipal facilities and other sites; when evacuation centres are opened, operation switches to an unauthenticated disaster mode.

The town provides guidance on establishing voluntary disaster prevention organisations, and operates a system under which residents who have difficulty evacuating, such as elderly and disabled people, are registered as “people requiring assistance during evacuation”, with individual evacuation plans drawn up where necessary.

== Administration ==
=== Town emblem ===

The town emblem, which stylises the characters for “ichi” (市) and “kawa” (川), was adopted on 2 July 1964. The “ichi” represents soaring progress with an arrow, while the “kawa”, rendered as a circle, symbolises harmony.

=== Mayor ===
- Mayor: Yoshikazu Tsuda (津田義和 (つだ よしかず)) (in office since 9 August 2023 (Reiwa 5); first term)
- Deputy mayor: Tetsuya Obana (尾花哲也 (おばな てつや)) (in office since 1 January 2024 (Reiwa 6))
- Town staff: 103 (Reiwa 7 fiscal year)

Former mayors

- 1st – 安井九一, 12 August 1955 – 10 July 1959, 1 term
- 2nd – 後藤丹次, 8 August 1959 – 7 August 1967, 2 terms
- 3rd – 木村円次, 8 August 1967 – 7 August 1979, 3 terms
- 4th – 山下光雄, 8 August 1979 – 7 August 1991, 3 terms
- 5th – 安積正義, 8 August 1991 – 7 August 1995, 1 term
- 6th – 尾崎光雄, 8 August 1995 – 7 August 1999, 1 term
- 7th – 松下洋一, 8 August 1999 – 7 August 2003, 1 term
- 8th – 尾崎光雄, 8 August 2003 – 7 August 2011, 2 terms
- 9th – 岡本修平, 8 August 2011 – 7 August 2015, 1 term
- 10th – 岩見武三, 9 August 2015 – 8 August 2023, 2 terms

Former deputy mayors

- 1st – 藤原茂, 1 April 2007 – 23 August 2011
- 2nd – 岡本哲夫, 1 October 2011 – 10 August 2015
- 3rd – 藤原茂, 1 January 2016 – 22 August 2023

== External relations ==
=== Sister cities and friendship cities ===
==== Overseas ====
Sister cities

City/town	Country	Region	Date of agreement
Port Townsend, Washington	United States	Washington	24 October 2002 (Heisei 14)

=== Regional cooperation ===
Collaborative core city area

- Harima regional collaborative core city area – On 5 April 2015 (Heisei 27), Ichikawa Town signed a cooperation agreement designating Himeji as the collaborative core city. Ichikawa is one of the participating municipalities (eight cities and eight towns).

Cooperation within Kanzaki District

- Comprehensive partnership agreement on regional revitalisation – On 17 December 2018 (Heisei 30), a signing ceremony for the “Comprehensive Partnership Agreement on Regional Revitalisation” was held at the Kamikawa Town Hall, involving the municipalities and chambers of commerce of Ichikawa Town, Fukusaki, and Kamikawa, together with Tanyo Shinkin Bank.

== Legislature ==
=== Town council ===
The town’s deliberative body. Regular sessions are held four times a year (March, June, September and December), with extraordinary sessions convened as required. Proceedings can also be viewed via internet broadcast of council sessions.

- Membership: 12
- Term of office: 23 September 2023 – 22 September 2027
- Chair: 中岡輝昭
- Vice-chair: 藤本壮啓

=== House of Representatives ===
- Constituency: Hyogo 12th district (Aioi, Tatsuno, Ako, Shiso, Himeji (former Ieshima, Yumesaki, Kodera and Yasutomi areas), Kanzaki District, Ibo District, Ako District and Sayō District)
- Term of office: 8 February 2026 – 7 February 2030
- Polling day: 8 February 2026
- Registered voters on polling day: 269,062
- Turnout: 58.38%

51st election · Hyogo 12th district
Result	Candidate	Age	Party	Status	Votes	Dual candidacy
Elected	Tsuyoshi Yamaguchi (山口壯, Yamaguchi Tsuyoshi; やまぐち つよし)	71	Liberal Democratic Party	Incumbent	78,957	Yes
Elected (PR)	Kotaro Ikehata (池畑浩太朗, Ikehata Kōtarō; いけはた こうたろう)	51	Japan Innovation Party	Incumbent	53,882	Yes
Defeated	Kiyoyuki Oota (太田清幸, Ōta Kiyoyuki; おおた きよゆき)	70	Japanese Communist Party	New	15,935	

== Economy ==
More than half of employed persons work in the tertiary sector, but the secondary sector also accounts for a high share (39.4%). Manufacturing is distinguished by metalworking related to golf, while primary industries show a declining trend in both employed persons and farm household numbers.

Employment structure by sector
Of 5,546 employed persons, 194 (3.5%) work in the primary sector, 2,179 (39.4%) in the secondary sector and 3,154 (57.1%) in the tertiary sector (2020 Population Census, Reiwa 2 (2020))

=== Primary sector ===
Unless otherwise noted, figures in this subsection are from the 2025 (Reiwa 7) Agriculture and Forestry Census (Hyōgo Prefecture statistical tables).

Primary-sector employed persons
194 (agriculture 184, forestry 10) (2020 Population Census, Reiwa 2 (2020))

==== Agriculture ====
Farm household numbers have continued to fall, from 2,316 households in 1975 (Shōwa 50) to 733 in 2020 (Reiwa 2) (both figures use the former census category “farm households”). Farmland is distributed in belts along the main stream of the Ichikawa River and its tributaries, with rice cultivation as the mainstay. Organic farming is also active in the eastern foothills of Mount Kasagata.

- Agriculture and forestry management entities

208 (179 individuals; 29 collective entities, including 16 corporations)

Agriculture management entities: 206 (179 individuals; 27 collective entities, including 15 corporations)
Forestry management entities: 4 (2 individuals; 2 collective entities, including 1 corporation)

- Total farm households

539 households (180 commercial farm households, including 2 corporations; 359 subsistence farm households)

- Managed farmland

204 entities with managed farmland
Total managed farmland area: 556.11 ha (55,611 a; about 6.7% of the town area)

Breakdown: paddy fields 498.4 ha, dry fields 56.09 ha, orchard land 1.62 ha
Average per entity: 272.6 a (556.11 ha ÷ 204 entities)
Of which leased farmland: 463.69 ha (113 entities); owned farmland: 92.42 ha (178 entities)

- Rice cultivation area

Table rice: 156 cultivating entities; cultivated area 320.27 ha

- Core agricultural workers

127 (111 men, 16 women); average age 68.7

- Dependence on agricultural income

Entities primarily dependent on agricultural income: 69
Entities primarily dependent on non-agricultural income: 110

==== Forestry ====
Mountainous land accounts for about 75% of the town area of 82.67 km^{2}.

- Forestry employed persons

10 (2020 Population Census)

- Forestry management entities

4 (2 individuals; 2 collective entities, including 1 corporation) (Table 3-1)

=== Secondary sector ===
Unless otherwise noted, figures in this subsection are from the Reiwa 5 (2023) Economic Structure Actual Survey (Manufacturing Establishments Survey) (municipal tables and land/water-use tables).

Secondary-sector employed persons
2,179 (manufacturing 1,737; construction 441; mining 1) (2020 Population Census, Reiwa 2 (2020))

==== Industry ====
Ichikawa is known as the birthplace of Japan’s first domestically made golf club iron heads in Shōwa 5 (1930), and manufacturing of sporting goods and metal goods using swordsmithing and forging techniques has become a core local industry. As of July 2025, the town had about 20 golf-related businesses.

- Manufacturing establishments and employees

48 establishments; 1,552 employees (Municipal Table No. 2; establishments with four or more employees)

Value of manufactured goods shipments: ¥36.164 billion
Value added: ¥15.120 billion
Total cash wages: ¥5.995 billion
Value of raw materials used: ¥19.557 billion

- Year-on-year change

Establishments 47 → 48 (+2.1%); employees 1,516 → 1,552 (+2.4%) (Municipal Table No. 3; Reiwa 4 → Reiwa 5)
Value of manufactured goods shipments ¥35.091 billion → ¥36.164 billion (+3.1%); value added ¥16.420 billion → ¥15.120 billion (−7.9%)

- By employee size

4–29 employees: 30 establishments, 342 employees, ¥7.746 billion (Municipal Table No. 5)
30 or more employees: 18 establishments, 1,210 employees, ¥28.418 billion (Municipal Table No. 4)

- Industrial land and water use

Industrial site area: 383,068 m^{2} (18 establishments) (Land/Water Table No. 5; establishments with 30 or more employees)
Total water use: 322 m^{3}/day (municipal water supply 125; well water 197) (Land/Water Table No. 6)

- Manufacturing employed persons

1,737 (2020 Population Census, Reiwa 2 (2020))

==== Construction ====
- Employed persons

441 (2020 Population Census)

=== Tertiary sector ===
Unless otherwise noted, figures in this subsection are from the Reiwa 3 (2021) Economic Census Activity Survey (wholesale and retail trade) (Tables 6 and 7).

Tertiary-sector employed persons
3,154 (services 1,856; wholesale, retail and restaurants 706; transport and communications 325; public service 137; finance and insurance 61; real estate 37; electricity, gas, heat supply and water supply 32) (2020 Population Census, Reiwa 2 (2020))

==== Commerce ====
- Wholesale and retail establishments and employees

73 establishments; 482 employees

Annual merchandise sales: ¥8.994 billion

Wholesale establishments: 6

Employees: 17
Annual merchandise sales: ¥436.9 million

Retail establishments: 67

Employees: 465
Annual merchandise sales: ¥8.557 billion
Sales floor area: 5,250 m^{2}

- Wholesale, retail and restaurant employed persons

706 (2020 Population Census, Reiwa 2 (2020))

==== Service industry ====
- Employed persons

1,856 (2020 Population Census)

==== Other ====
- Employed persons

592 (2020 Population Census)

Transport and communications: 325
Public service: 137
Finance and insurance: 61
Real estate: 37
Electricity, gas, heat supply and water supply: 32

== Local specialities ==
- Golf clubs – birthplace of Japan’s domestically produced iron heads; manufacturing by soft forging is active
- Tazumi eggs (タズミの卵) – brand eggs produced by Tazumi Poultry Farm (田隅養鶏場) in the town

== Public institutions ==
=== Facilities ===
==== Government offices ====
- Ichikawa Town Hall (165-3 Nishikawanabe)
- Ichikawa Town Employment Improvement Centre (177 Nishikawanabe)
- Ichikawa Town Health and Welfare Centre (323-1 Amaji)
- Ichikawa Town Board of Education (848 Obata)
- Ichikawa Town Community Centre (848 Obata)
- Regional Child-rearing Support Centre (1216 Higashikawanabe)
- Ichikawa Town Senior Citizens’ Welfare Centre (108-1 Tsurui)
- Ichikawa Town Joint School Lunch Preparation Centre (440-1 Chihara)
- Ichikawa Town Child Welfare Centre (149-1 Chihara)
- Ichikawa Town General Waste Landfill Final Disposal Site (443 Kamiseka)
- Ichikawa Crematorium (1068-5 Yakata)
- Kamiseka Water Purification Plant (474 Kamiseka)

==== Post offices ====
- Ichikawa Post Office (178-3 Amaji); ATM available
- Ichikawa Seka Post Office (1714-4 Kamiseka); ATM available
- Yakata Post Office (521-4 Yakata); ATM available
- Obata Post Agency (224-7 Higashikawanabe); no ATM
- Ichikawa Misa Post Agency (382-1 Misa); no ATM

==== Cultural facilities ====
- Ichikawa Town Culture Centre (715 Nishikawanabe)
- Shinobu Hashimoto Memorial Museum (715 Nishikawanabe; within the Culture Centre)
- Ichikawa Library (715 Nishikawanabe)
- Okabe Community Centre Hall (1736-2 Kamiseka)
- Kasagata Community Centre Hall (94-1 Kamiushio)

==== Sports facilities ====
- Ichikawa Town Sports Centre (498 Kitatanaka)
- Ichikawa Town General Ground (129 Komuro)
- Ichikawa Town Health Plaza Park (1010 Misa)

== Healthcare ==
There are no hospitals (medical institutions with general inpatient beds) within the town. Routine outpatient care is provided by clinics and dental surgeries in the town, whilst inpatient treatment and specialist care are received at hospitals and other medical institutions in neighbouring areas. If you are unsure where to go for a sudden illness or injury, you can telephone for advice from doctors, nurses and other staff on the short code #7119, available across Hyōgo Prefecture 24 hours a day, 365 days a year. The town provides free medical care for children from birth until the end of the school year in which they turn 18 (upper secondary school year 3).

=== Maternal and child health ===
As part of programmes under the Maternal and Child Health Act, maternal and child health services, health counselling and vaccinations are provided by the Ichikawa Town Health and Welfare Centre (323-1 Amaji). (→Public institutions) From April 2025 (Reiwa 7), the town established the Parent and Child Sukuoyaka Centre (Ichikawa Town Kodomo Katei Centre) within the same centre as a comprehensive consultation service for expectant and nursing mothers, child-rearing families and children under 18.

Pregnancy and childbirth
Public health nurses conduct pregnancy interviews (a mid-term interview at around six months of pregnancy and a late-term interview at around eight months). Free dental check-ups for pregnant women and postnatal care (mainly for those within one year of childbirth; those who have experienced miscarriage or stillbirth may also consult) are also provided.

Infants and home visits
Public health nurses conduct newborn visits and postnatal visits (home visits to all households with infants) for infants up to four months of age and their mothers or other carers.

Financial support
For pregnant women in households exempt from resident tax or receiving public assistance, the town subsidises the first obstetric consultation fee up to ¥10,000. The town also runs a programme to subsidise part of the costs of infertility examination and treatment not covered by health insurance. For single-mother and single-father families, medical certificates for mother–child and father–child medical care subsidise the patient’s share of insured medical costs.

Classes and gatherings
Classes and gatherings such as parent classes (for pregnant women and partners), Mama Café (for pregnant women and parent–child pairs within seven months of birth) and the parent–child cookery class “Sweet Shop Play” (for pre-school children and guardians) are held at the Health and Welfare Centre and other venues.

=== Hospitals ===
Main hospitals in neighbouring areas

- Kanzaki Public General Hospital (Kamikawa) — internal medicine, surgery, orthopaedics, obstetrics and gynaecology, paediatrics, ophthalmology, dentistry and other departments
- Himeji Kita Hospital (Fukusaki) — psychiatry and psychosomatic medicine

=== Clinics ===
Clinics and dental surgeries in the town are as follows.

Internal medicine
Kimura Clinic (891-1 Higashikawanabe) — internal medicine, ophthalmology
Tazumi Internal Medicine Clinic (804-12 Amaji) — internal medicine
Fujikawa Clinic (520-1 Yakata) — internal medicine, paediatrics
Matsuoka Clinic (1205-1 Shimoseka) — internal medicine, paediatrics, surgery

Orthopaedics
Ono Orthopaedic Clinic (612 Nishikawanabe) — orthopaedics

Dentistry
Kataoka Dental Clinic (347-1 Nishikawanabe)
Tazumi Dental Clinic (804-12 Amaji)
Fujimoto Dental Clinic (297-1 Tsurui)
Yamaguchi Dental Clinic (825-2 Amaji)
Shimoyama Dental Clinic (635 Nishikawanabe)

=== Medical specialities in neighbouring municipalities ===
Medical specialities not available in the town are mainly provided by institutions in Fukusaki and Kamikawa.

Obstetrics and gynaecology
Sasaki Obstetrics and Gynaecology (Fukusaki), Matsuoka Obstetrics and Gynaecology Clinic (Fukusaki)

Ophthalmology
Fukuda Ophthalmology (Kamikawa), Tamura Ophthalmology (Fukusaki)

Otorhinolaryngology
Maki Otorhinolaryngology Clinic (Fukusaki)

Dermatology
Miyake Dermatology Clinic (Fukusaki)

Surgery (neighbouring areas)
Akitake Surgical Clinic (Fukusaki)

Orthopaedics (neighbouring areas)
Minami Orthopaedic Clinic (Fukusaki) — orthopaedics, rheumatology

=== Pharmacies ===
There are five dispensing pharmacies in the town.

- Tanpopo Pharmacy (520-4 Yakata)
- Tanpopo Pharmacy Seka Branch (1205-12 Shimoseka)
- Family Pharmacy (891-3 Higashikawanabe)
- Family Pharmacy Ichikawa Branch (618-6 Nishikawanabe)
- Amaji Pharmacy (805-49 Amaji)

=== Travel to medical appointments ===
The Seka and Asano routes of the Ichikawa Town community bus connect with Kanzaki Public General Hospital.

== Transport ==
=== Rail ===
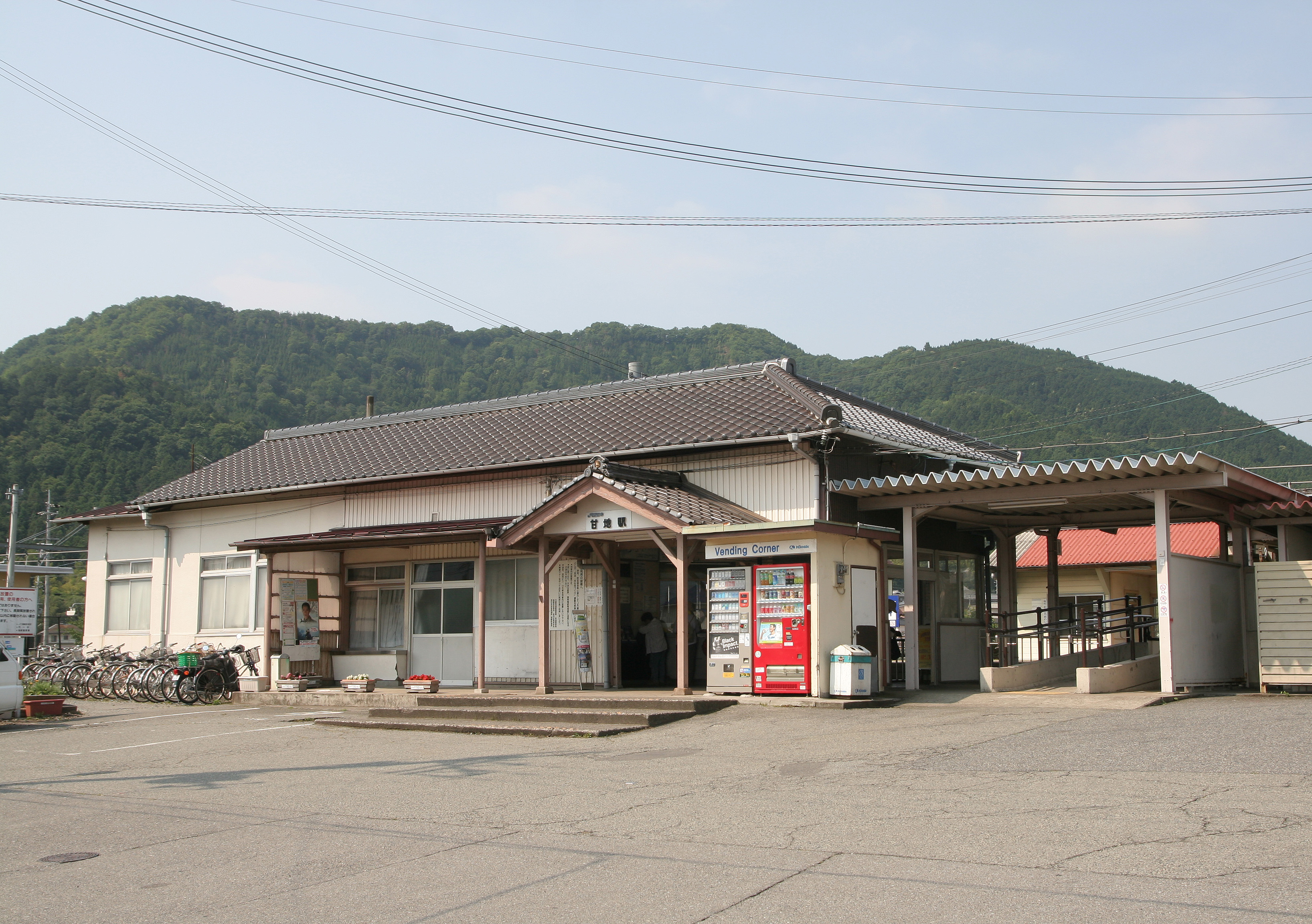
Amaji Station

Main station: Amaji Station

West Japan Railway Company (JR West)

J

Bantan Line
- – (Fukusaki Station) – Amaji Station – Tsurui Station – (Niino Station) –
※ Tsurui Station is an unstaffed station.
※ Some areas are closer to Fukusaki Station in neighbouring Fukusaki.
※ The limited express Hamakaze stops at Fukusaki Station but not at stations within the town.

==== Connections to other cities ====
Neighbouring municipalities
- Fukusaki — local train: about 4 minutes (Amaji Station – Fukusaki Station)
- Himeji — local train: about 30 minutes (Amaji Station – Himeji Station)
- Kamikawa — local train: about 11 minutes (Amaji Station – Teramae Station)

Wider region
- Kobe (Sannomiya Station) — local train (Amaji Station – Himeji Station) to Himeji, then transfer to the Sanyō Main Line (JR Kōbe Line) Special Rapid: about 1 hour 20 minutes
- Osaka (Osaka Station) — local train (Amaji Station – Himeji Station) to Himeji, then transfer to the Sanyō Main Line Special Rapid: about 1 hour 40 minutes
※ The above wider-area times are approximate and include transfer waiting time at Himeji Station. Excluding waiting time, the journey takes about 1 hour 10 minutes to Sannomiya and about 1 hour 30 minutes to Osaka.

=== Bus ===
The town’s community buses are the main form of public transport. The fare is ¥100 per ride (one way) on all routes. Services operate in principle from Monday to Friday (no service on Saturdays, Sundays or public holidays).

Ichikawa Town community bus (Seka route)
Connects Seka and Kanzaki Public General Hospital. Operates Monday to Friday.

Ichikawa Town community bus (Asano route)
Connects Asano and Kanzaki Public General Hospital. Operates Monday to Friday.

Ichikawa Town shopping bus
Operates for shopping, medical appointments and similar purposes. On Mondays and Fridays, it serves the Seka and Kawanabe areas; on Tuesdays and Thursdays, the Amaji and Tsurui areas.

Fukusaki–Ichikawa partnership community bus
Reservation-based service Monday to Friday. Connects with the Seka and Asano community bus routes above; passengers transfer at the Ichikawa Town Hall bus stop to reach commercial facilities and other destinations in Fukusaki.

=== Taxi ===
- Kanzaki Kotsu Taxi (Kanzaki Transport Co., Ltd.) — available at Amaji Station, Fukusaki Station and other locations

=== Roads ===
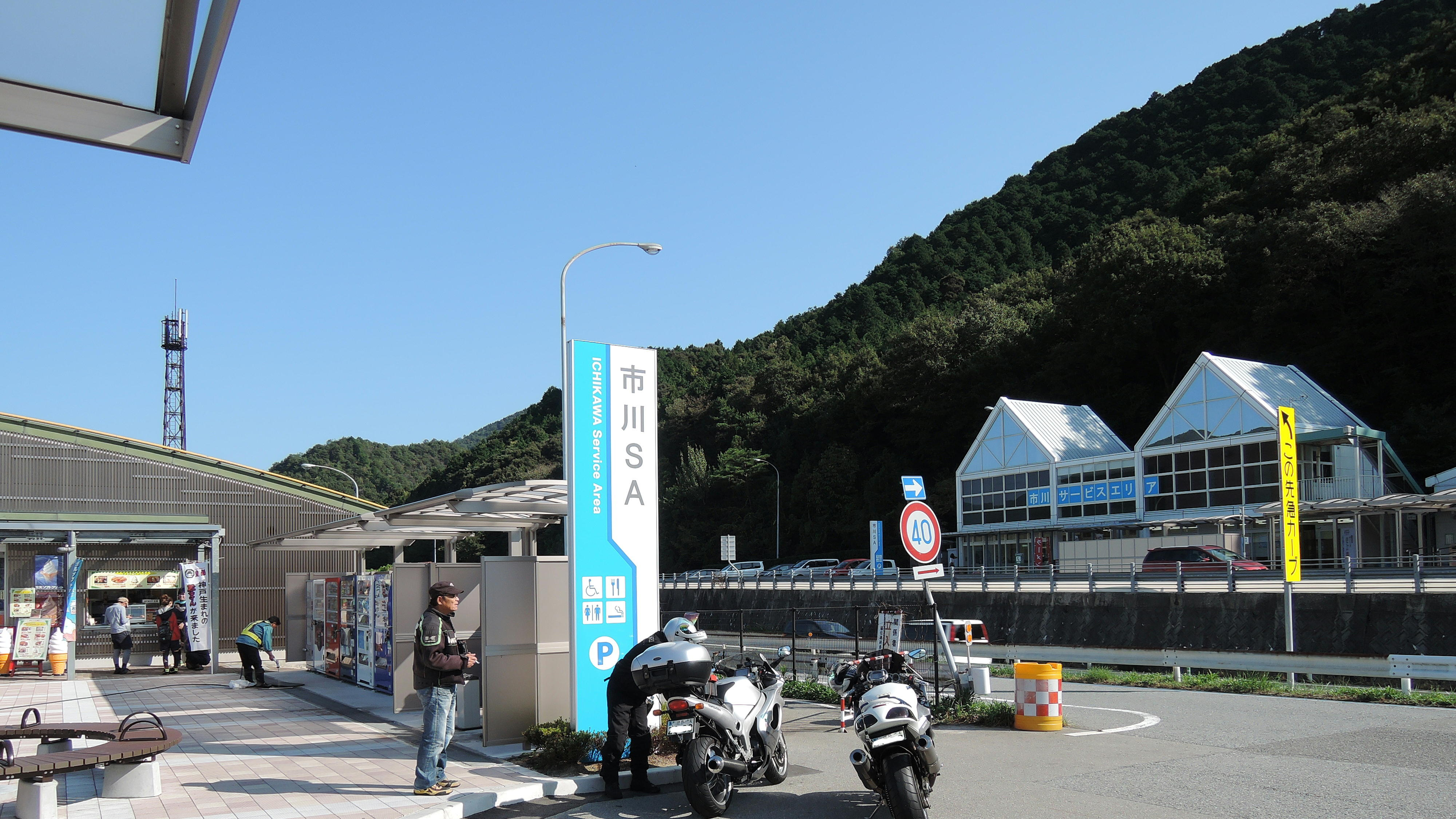
Ichikawa Service Area

==== Highways ====
Hyōgo Prefectural Road Public Corporation (Bantan Renraku Road)

- Bantan Renraku Road: – Ichikawa South Interchange – Ichikawa SA – Ichikawa North Interchange –

The Ichikawa South and Ichikawa North interchanges opened on 1 November 1975 (Shōwa 50) when the section between Fukusaki North Interchange and Ichikawa North Interchange came into service. On 28 September 1982 (Shōwa 57), the section between Ichikawa North Interchange and Kanzaki North Interchange opened, extending the main route towards Kamikawa.

==== National routes ====
- National Route 312

==== Prefectural roads ====
Major prefectural roads

- Hyōgo Prefectural Route 34 (Nishiwaki-Yachiyo-Ichikawa Line)

General prefectural roads

- Hyōgo Prefectural Route 145 (Shimotakino-Ichikawa Line)
- Hyōgo Prefectural Route 214 (Tsurui Station Line)
- Hyōgo Prefectural Route 215 (Amaji Station Line)
- Hyōgo Prefectural Route 404 (Hase-Ichikawa Line)
- Hyōgo Prefectural Route 405 (Amaji-Fukusaki Line)
- Hyōgo Prefectural Route 407 (Maenoshō-Ichikawa Line)

=== Vehicle registration plates ===
Himeji plates

Vehicles are assigned registration plates under the jurisdiction of the Himeji Motor Vehicle Inspection and Registration Office (Kobe Transport Branch).

== Education ==
According to the Reiwa 5 (2023) School Basic Survey (as of 1 May), municipal elementary schools had 455 pupils and the municipal junior high school had 260 students. As of 1 April Reiwa 6 (2024), there were 185 children with Category 2 and 3 certification at certified kodomo-en, a decrease of 32.5 per cent from 274 in Reiwa 2 (2020). School lunch fees are free at Ichikawa Junior High School, whilst elementary schools charge a reduced fee of ¥300 per month. From fiscal year 2024 (Reiwa 6), the town has introduced the community school system.

=== Senior high schools ===
Private

- Ichikawa High School

=== Junior high schools ===
Municipal

- Ichikawa Municipal Junior High School

=== Elementary schools ===
Municipal

- Ichikawa Municipal Kawanabe Elementary School
- Ichikawa Municipal Seka Elementary School
- Ichikawa Municipal Amaji Elementary School
- Ichikawa Municipal Tsurui Elementary School

=== Nurseries and kindergartens ===
For children aged from six months to under three who are not enrolled at a kodomo-en or similar facility, the town runs the infant attendance support programme (the “Free Early Childhood Education and Care for All Children” scheme). Use is limited to ten hours per month, with Ichikawa East and West Kodomo-en serving as accepting facilities. Nursery fees are also reduced for households with multiple children (half price for the second child; free from the third child onwards).

Public integrated kodomo-en (certified nursery and kindergarten)

- Ichikawa West Kodomo-en
- Ichikawa East Kodomo-en

Private certified kodomo-en

- Yakata Kodomo-en

=== After-school children’s clubs ===
Clubs are open on weekdays until 6:30 p.m., with an extension until 7:00 p.m. available on request.

Municipal (after-school healthy upbringing programme for children)

- Obata After-school Children’s Club
- Amaji After-school Children’s Club

=== Other ===
- Democratic School Makkuro Kurosuke — a Sudbury school
- “Fermata” community space project — a free meeting place for children, young people and their families who find it difficult to go out or attend school owing to non-attendance, social withdrawal or similar circumstances. Held at the workshop of the Ichikawa Town Culture Centre.

=== Former schools ===
- Ichikawa Municipal Commercial School (established 1959; reorganised in 1961 as Ichikawa Gakuin Ichikawa Commercial High School)
- Ichikawa Municipal Obata Elementary School (closed March 2008; merged into Ichikawa Municipal Kawanabe Elementary School)
- Ichikawa Municipal Seka Junior High School (closed March 2014; merged into Ichikawa Municipal Junior High School)
- Tsurui Nursery (closed March 2018)
- Tsurui Kindergarten (closed March 2018)
- Kawanabe Nursery (closed March 2019)
- Seka Nursery (closed March 2019)
- Ichikawa Municipal Tsurui Junior High School (closed March 2022; merged into Ichikawa Municipal Junior High School)

=== Sick-child and convalescent childcare ===
On 1 March 2021 (Reiwa 3), the three municipalities of Kanzaki District (Ichikawa, Fukusaki and Kamikawa) jointly opened the Kanzaki District Sick-child and Convalescent Childcare Service (Kanzaki District Sick-child and Convalescent Childcare Facility) on the second floor of Care Station Kanzaki, on the grounds of Kanzaki Public General Hospital in Kamikawa. The service temporarily cares for children who are ill or recovering and cannot participate in group life at nurseries, elementary schools or similar settings.

Eligible children (general conditions)

- Generally from six months of age through elementary school year 6
- Children resident in Kanzaki District, or children resident outside the district whose guardians work at workplaces within the district
- Children for whom home care is temporarily difficult owing to guardians’ employment, illness or injury, childbirth, nursing care, ceremonial occasions or other circumstances generally regarded as unavoidable
- Children who have received a medical diagnosis and for whom a physician has completed a “use contact form”

How to use the service

- Advance registration is required in principle
- Same-day admission has been available since 1 April 2024 (Reiwa 6). Reservations may be made from 8:30 a.m. on the day before use; for same-day admission, telephone applications are accepted from 7:30 a.m. on the day of use

== History ==
The area of the modern town of Ichikawa was within ancient Harima Province. In the Edo Period, it was divided between Himeji Domain and tenryō territory under direct administration of the Tokugawa shogunate. Following the Meiji restoration, the villages of Amaji, Kawanabe, Seka and Tsurui were created within Kanzaki District, Hyōgo. The four villages merged on March 31, 1955 forming the town of Ichikawa.

== Places of interest ==
Amaji no Shimizu

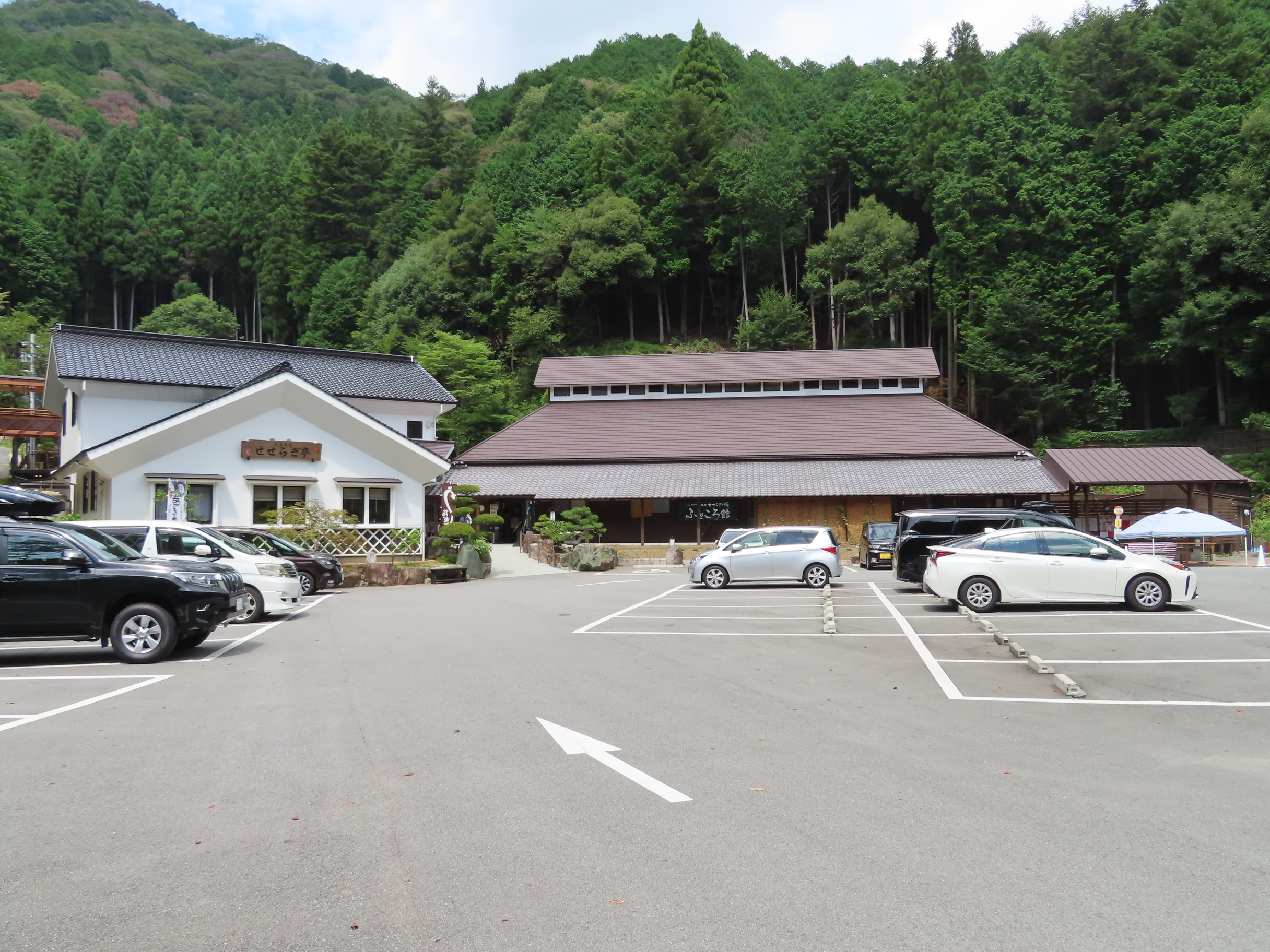
Kasagata Onsen Seseragi-no-Yu

=== Nature and mountaineering ===
- Mount Kasagata (elevation 939 m (3,081 ft); the “Harima Fuji”) — from the summit, views extend over the mountain ranges of Tajima and Tanba and the Seto Inland Sea. At the foot of the mountain are Kasagata temple, Kasagata Shrine, Sennin Falls (35 m (115 ft) drop) and other sites.
- Kasagata Temple — traditionally said to have been founded in the Hakuchi era (650–654); one of the oldest temples in the town. It houses a wooden statue of Fudō Myōō (a town cultural property), among other items.
- Kasagata Shrine — said to have been founded about 1,300 years ago. A monument commemorates the sacred tree that was donated for the central pillar of the keep of Himeji Castle, a National Treasure.
- Amaji no Shimizu — spring water in front of the gate of Sekisei-ji in Amaji

=== Hot springs, accommodation and leisure ===
- Kasagata Onsen Seseragi-no-Yu — a natural hot spring at the foot of Mount Kasagata. About 20 minutes by car from Fukusaki Interchange on the Chūgoku Expressway.
- Refresh Park Ichikawa — a community facility with accommodation, camping, hot springs, restaurants and other amenities
- Omoide Museum — a private museum in Kamiushio. Exhibits include Shōwa-period folk tools, cameras and butterfly specimens (free admission).

=== Culture and history ===
- Shinobu Hashimoto Memorial Museum — within the Ichikawa Town Culture Centre. Permanent displays of screenplays, award trophies and other items relating to screenwriter Shinobu Hashimoto (free admission).
- Silver Cart Road (Gin-no-Bashamichi) — a Meiji-period carriage-road heritage site. A carriage monument, “Hayabu”, stands along National Route 312 in Asano.
- Sunflower Fields — to promote the town flower, the sunflower, agricultural cooperatives and others cultivate fields in various parts of the town. Blooming status is updated on the town’s official website.

== Festivals and events ==
=== Annual events ===
- Hyōgo Ichikawa Marathon National Tournament (third Sunday in February) — more than 2,000 runners take part from across Japan. The race starts from the Ichikawa Town Sports Centre.
- Ichikawa Festival (late July) — night stalls, stage events and a group performance of the Ichikawa Ondo on the lawn of the Ichikawa Town Culture Centre.
- Amaji Lion Dance dedication (early September and early October) — dedication performances of “Amaji Lion Dance”, a prefecturally designated cultural property of Hyogo Prefecture. Held at Amaji Hachiman Shrine (early September) and Oku Ōtoshi Shrine (early October).

=== Other events ===
- Himarin Morning Market (on the second Saturday of each month, among other dates) — Ichikawa Terrace
- Amaji Station-front Yukata Festival (July) — Amaji Station forecourt car park
- Cool Evening Festival and Scorching Heat Festival (August and September) — lawn of the Ichikawa Town Culture Centre

== Notable people ==
=== Natives of the town ===
==== Historical figures ====
- Rihachi Naito (内藤利八 (ないとう りはち)) (politician and businessman in the Meiji era; involved in the construction of the Bantan Railway. Born in Higashikawanabe, Ichikawa Town, in Ansei 3 (1856))
- Kaneo Hinokimoto (檜本兼夫 (ひのきもと かねお)) (waka (poetry) poet; born in Shimoushio, Ichikawa Town, in Taishō 2 (1913))
- Shinobu Hashimoto (橋本忍 (はしもと しのぶ)) (screenwriter; born in Tsurui, Ichikawa Town, in Taishō 7 (1918))

==== Academic and medical ====
- Masato Fujisawa (藤澤正人 (ふじさわ まさと)) (15th president of Kobe University; a leading figure in the development of Japan’s first domestically produced surgical support robot, “hinotori”)
- Kunio Haoka (羽岡邦男 (はおか くにお)) (psychologist)

==== Culture and entertainment ====
- Yūki Fukumoto (福本雄樹 (ふくもと ゆうき)) (actor)
- Hikaru (YouTuber)
- Takahiro Hamada (濵田崇裕 (はまだ たかひろ)) (idol and actor; member of WEST.)

==== Sports ====
- Kenji Miyamoto (宮本賢治 (みやもと けんじ)) (former professional baseball pitcher)
- Syūya Iwami (岩見秀哉 (いわみ しゅうや)) (track and field athlete; Sumitomo Electric)

=== Furusato PR ambassadors ===
- Onna to Otoko (comedy duo: Yoshikazu Ichikawa and Wada-chan). Furusato Ichikawa PR ambassadors since July 2017 (Heisei 29). The “Ichikawa” in the duo’s name comes from a surname and does not indicate that they are from the town. Onna to Otoko Channel (official YouTube), Ichikawa House (town PR project)

=== Mascot ===
- Himarin — Ichikawa Town’s image character, modelled on the town flower, the sunflower. The name was chosen in 2010, and the character made its debut at the Hyōgo Ichikawa Marathon National Tournament in February of the same year. Himarin appears at town events and in tourism promotion.
