= Niino Station =

Railway station in Kamikawa, Hyōgo Prefecture, Japan

Niino Station 新野駅
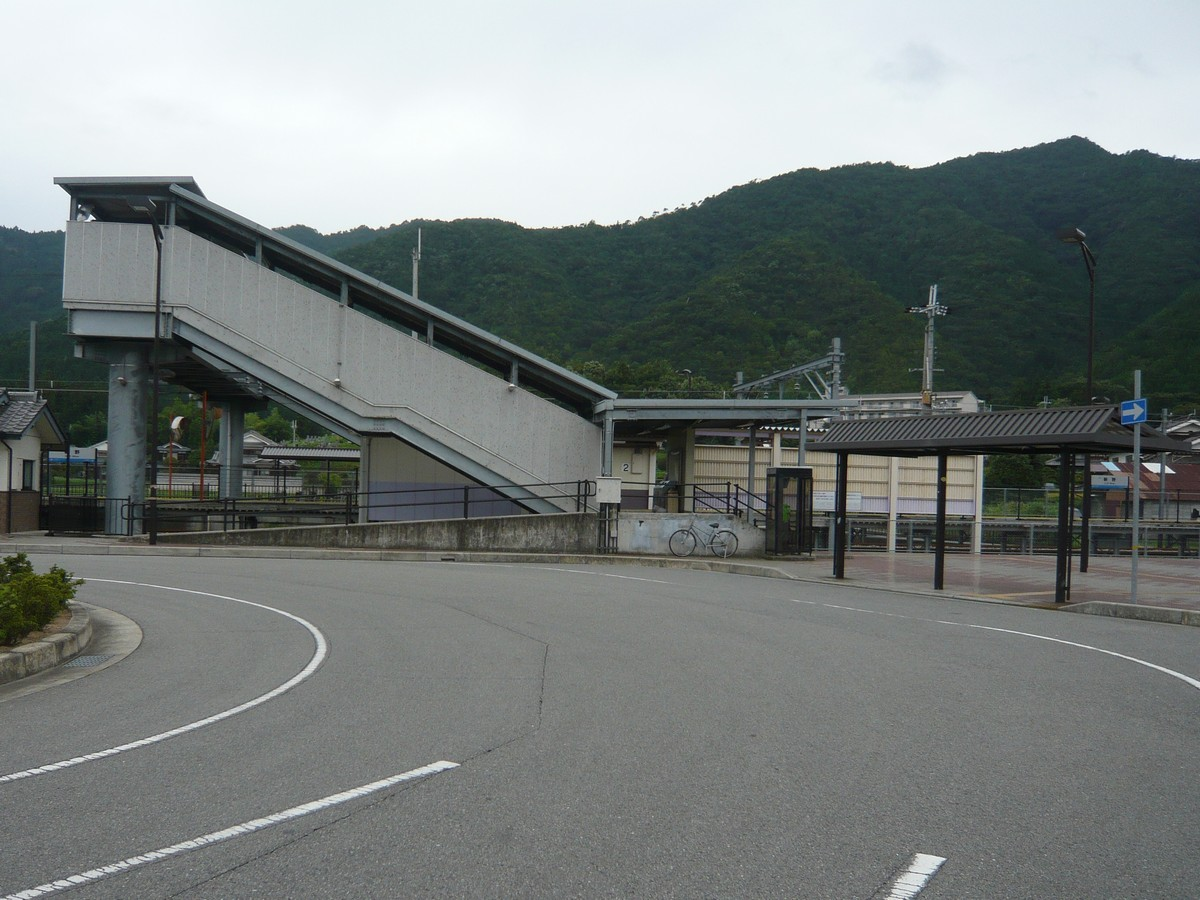
- Niino Station, August 2007

General information
- Location: 227-2 Niino-Nakamura, Kamikawa-chō, Kanzaki-gun, Hyōgo-ken 679-3114; Japan
- Coordinates: 35°03′01″N 134°45′09″E
- Owner: West Japan Railway Company
- Operator: West Japan Railway Company
- Line: Bantan Line
- Distance: 27.7 km (17.2 miles) from Himeji
- Platforms: 2 side platforms
- Connections: Bus stop

Other information
- Status: Unstaffed
- Website: Official website

History
- Opened: 15 October 1951

Passengers
- FY2016: 595 daily
Location
- Location within Hyōgo Prefecture Location within Japan

Niino Station (新野駅, Niino-eki) is a passenger railway station located in the town of Kamikawa, Kanzaki District, Hyōgo Prefecture, Japan, operated by West Japan Railway Company (JR West).

== Lines ==
Niino Station is served by the Bantan Line, and is located 27.7 kilometers from the terminus of the line at Himeji.

== Station layout ==
The station consists of two opposed side platforms connected to the station building by a footbridge. The station is unattended.

=== Platforms ===
1	■ Bantan Line	for Fukusaki and Himeji
2	■ Bantan Line	for Teramae, Wadayama

== Adjacent stations ==
«	Service	»
West Japan Railway Company
Bantan Line
Limited Express Hamakaze: Does not stop at this station
Tsurui	Local	Teramae

== History ==
Niino Station opened on October 5, 1951. With the privatization of the Japan National Railways (JNR) on April 1, 1987, the station came under the aegis of the West Japan Railway Company.

== Passenger statistics ==
In fiscal 2016, the station was used by an average of 595 passengers daily.

== Surrounding area ==
- Joko-ji temple

== See also ==
- List of railway stations in Japan
