= Fukusaki =

Fukusaki 福崎町
- Town
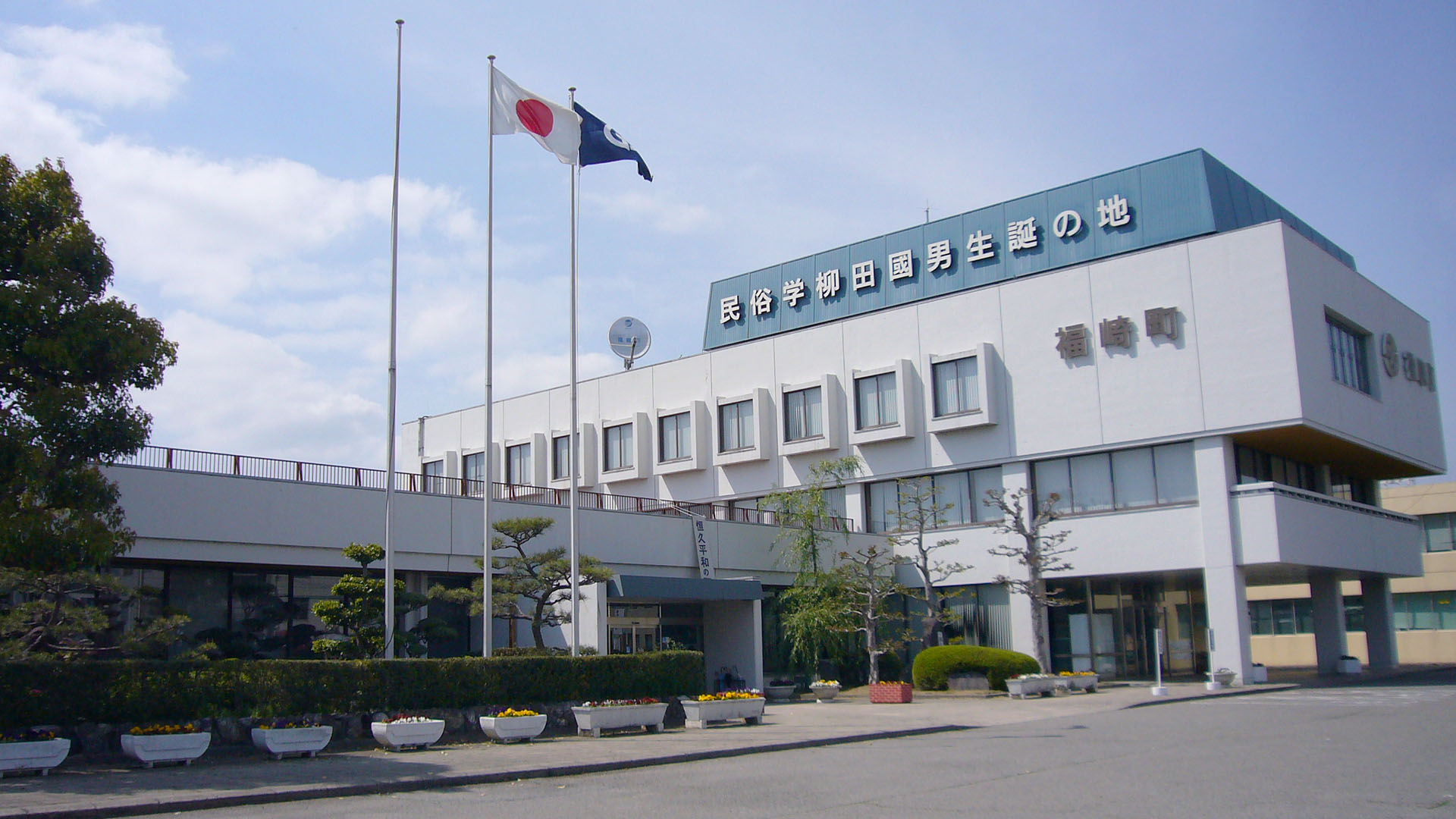
- Fukusaki City Hall

- Flag Chapter

- Location of Fukusaki in Hyōgo Prefecture

- Location in Japan
- Coordinates: 34°57′N 134°46′E
- Country: Japan
- Region: Kansai
- Prefecture: Hyōgo
- District: Kanzaki

Area
  - Total: 45.79 km^{2} (17.68 sq mi)

Population (April 30, 2022)
  - Total: 18,742
  - Density: 409.3/km^{2} (1,060/sq mi)
- Time zone: UTC+09:00 (JST)
- City hall address: 1-3116 Minamitawara, Fukusaki-chō, Kanzaki-gun, Hyōgo-ken
- Climate: Cfa
- Website: Official website
- Symbols
- Flower: Salvia splendens
- Tree: Kurogane Holly

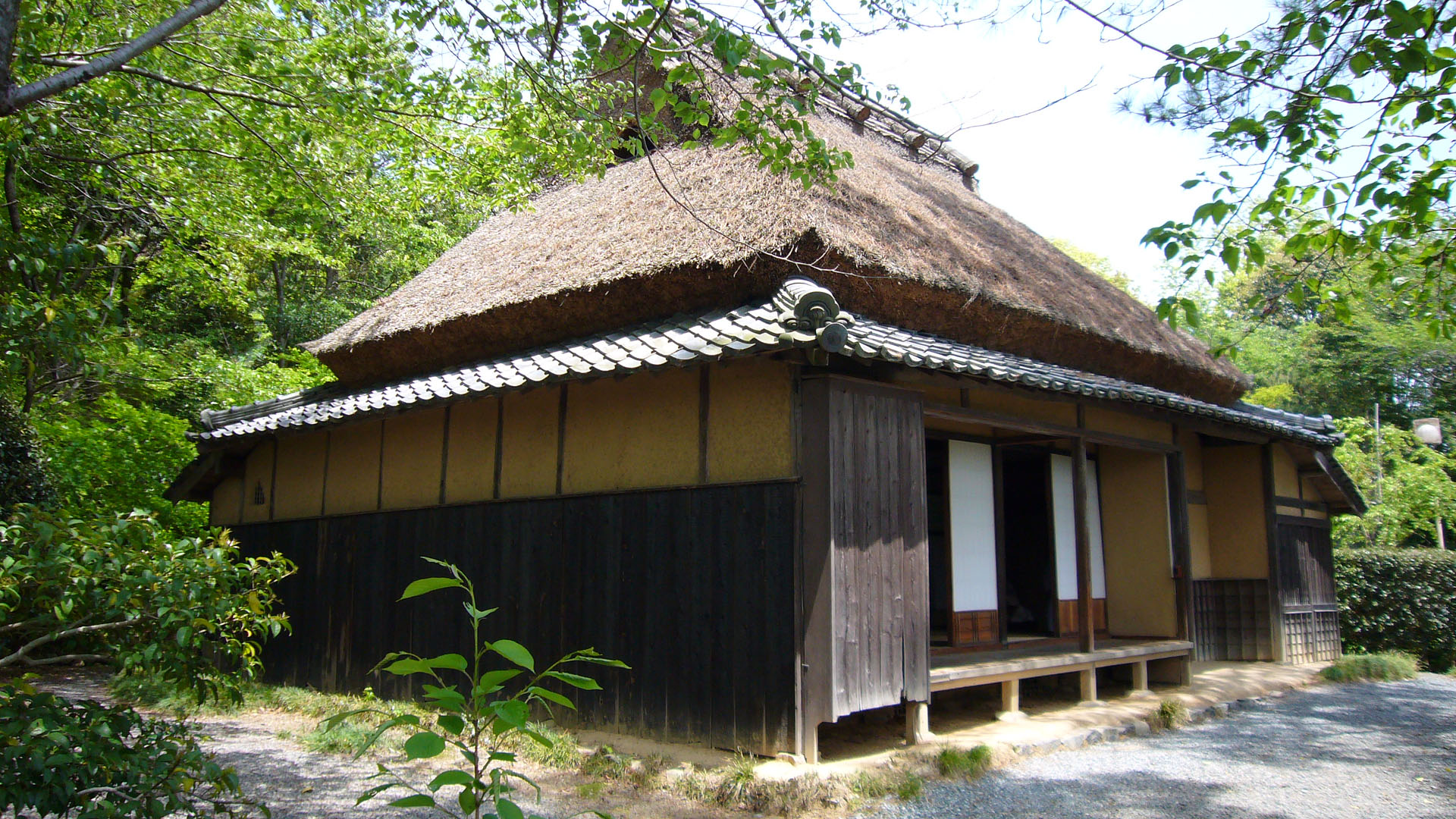
Kunio Yanagida birthplace

Fukusaki (福崎町, Fukusaki-chō) is a town in Kanzaki District, Hyōgo Prefecture, Japan. As of 30 April 2022, the town had an estimated population of 18,742 in 7803 households and a population density of 410 persons per km^{2}. The total area of the town is 45.79 square kilometres (17.68 sq mi).

== Geography ==
Fukusaki is located in the center of Hyōgo Prefecture, and occupies the middle part of Ichikawa River Basin. It is surrounded by low mountains and hills. Nagusayama (683 meters) in the northwestern end has seven waterfalls and many reservoirs are located in the eastern part of the town.

=== Neighbouring municipalities ===
Hyōgo Prefecture

- Himeji
- Ichikawa
- Kasai

=== Climate ===
Fukusaki has a humid subtropical climate (Köppen climate classification Cfa) with hot summers and cool to cold winters. Precipitation is significantly higher in summer than in winter, though on the whole lower than most parts of Honshū, and there is no significant snowfall. The average annual temperature in Fukusaki is 15.1 °C (59.2 °F). The average annual rainfall is 1,445.0 mm (56.89 in) with July as the wettest month. The temperatures are highest on average in August, at around 27.4 °C (81.3 °F), and lowest in January, at around 3.6 °C (38.5 °F). The highest temperature ever recorded in Fukusaki was 39.6 °C (103.3 °F) on 2 August 2026; the coldest temperature ever recorded was −7.8 °C (18.0 °F) on 3 February 1996.

Climate data for Fukusaki (1991−2020 normals, extremes 1977−present)
Month	Jan	Feb	Mar	Apr	May	Jun	Jul	Aug	Sep	Oct	Nov	Dec	Year
Record high °C (°F)	17.2 (63.0)	22.3 (72.1)	23.8 (74.8)	30.0 (86.0)	32.9 (91.2)	36.4 (97.5)	38.8 (101.8)	39.6 (103.3)	37.3 (99.1)	32.5 (90.5)	25.9 (78.6)	21.9 (71.4)	39.6 (103.3)
Mean daily maximum °C (°F)	8.8 (47.8)	9.8 (49.6)	13.7 (56.7)	19.6 (67.3)	24.7 (76.5)	27.8 (82.0)	31.5 (88.7)	33.2 (91.8)	28.9 (84.0)	23.1 (73.6)	17.0 (62.6)	11.2 (52.2)	20.8 (69.4)
Daily mean °C (°F)	3.6 (38.5)	4.4 (39.9)	7.8 (46.0)	13.3 (55.9)	18.4 (65.1)	22.4 (72.3)	26.3 (79.3)	27.4 (81.3)	23.5 (74.3)	17.5 (63.5)	11.3 (52.3)	5.8 (42.4)	15.1 (59.2)
Mean daily minimum °C (°F)	−0.6 (30.9)	−0.3 (31.5)	2.5 (36.5)	7.5 (45.5)	12.8 (55.0)	18.0 (64.4)	22.5 (72.5)	23.4 (74.1)	19.3 (66.7)	12.9 (55.2)	6.6 (43.9)	1.5 (34.7)	10.5 (50.9)
Record low °C (°F)	−7.7 (18.1)	−7.8 (18.0)	−5.6 (21.9)	−2.1 (28.2)	2.2 (36.0)	7.6 (45.7)	15.0 (59.0)	15.7 (60.3)	8.6 (47.5)	2.5 (36.5)	−2.6 (27.3)	−6.2 (20.8)	−7.8 (18.0)
Average precipitation mm (inches)	42.2 (1.66)	56.5 (2.22)	107.1 (4.22)	128.2 (5.05)	154.4 (6.08)	182.9 (7.20)	207.3 (8.16)	132.5 (5.22)	188.8 (7.43)	117.5 (4.63)	72.3 (2.85)	55.3 (2.18)	1,445 (56.89)
Average precipitation days (≥ 1.0 mm)	5.4	6.8	9.4	9.4	10.0	11.5	11.4	8.2	10.3	8.0	6.3	6.3	103
Mean monthly sunshine hours	141.6	134.6	170.0	187.7	192.7	142.1	150.3	195.6	152.5	165.2	149.4	148.3	1,929.9
Source: Japan Meteorological Agency

=== Demographics ===
Per Japanese census data, the population of Fukusaki in 2020 is 19,377 people. Fukusaki has been conducting censuses since 1920.

Historical population
Year	Pop.	±%
1920	11,377	—
1925	11,627	+2.2%
1930	12,155	+4.5%
1935	12,130	−0.2%
1940	12,340	+1.7%
1945	16,240	+31.6%
1950	16,385	+0.9%
1955	16,347	−0.2%
1960	16,312	−0.2%
1965	16,322	+0.1%
1970	16,637	+1.9%
1975	17,603	+5.8%
1980	18,089	+2.8%
1985	18,787	+3.9%
1990	19,913	+6.0%
1995	19,854	−0.3%
2000	19,582	−1.4%
2005	20,669	+5.6%
2010	19,829	−4.1%
2015	19,738	−0.5%
2020	19,377	−1.8%
Fukusaki population statistics

== History ==
The area of the modern town of Fukusaki was within ancient Harima Province. In the Edo Period, it was mostly under the controls of Himeji Domain with small portions as tenryō territory under direct administration of the Tokugawa shogunate. Following the Meiji restoration, the villages of Fukusaki was created within Kanzaki District, Hyōgo. On December 1, 1925, Fukuzawa merged with the neighboring village of Tomioka and was elevated to town status. Fukusaki expanded on May 3, 1956, by annexing the neighboring villages of Tahara and Yachikusa.

== Government ==
Fukusaki has a mayor-council form of government with a directly elected mayor and a unicameral town council of 14 members. Fukusaki, together with the other municipalities of Kanzaki District, contributes one member to the Hyogo Prefectural Assembly. In terms of national politics, the town is part of Hyōgo 12th district of the lower house of the Diet of Japan.

== Economy ==
Fukusaki has an economy centered on light manufacturing of electrical component, food processing, pharmaceuticals and metals processing, with agriculture playing a smaller role.

== Education ==
Fukusaki has four public elementary schools and two public middle schools operated by the town government and one public high school operated by the Hyōgo Prefectural Department of Education. The Kinki Health Welfare University is also located in the town.

== Transportation ==
=== Railway ===
JR West – Bantan Line

- Fukusaki

=== Highway ===
- Chūgoku Expressway
- Bantan Renraku Road
- National Route 312

== Local attractions ==
Kunio Yanagita (1875–1962) Was born in Fukusaki, and due to his importance in the study of Japanese folklore, the town has a number of yokai sculptures. In Tsujikawayama Park there are currently five statues whose designs were chosen through "The National Yokai Modeling contest". A total of 17 "Yokai benches" also exist within the town. As a way to create tourism, these benches were created and placed near local businesses and other points of interest.

Kunio Yanagita's house and Matsuoka family memorial museum

The house of folklorist Kunio Yanagita and memorial hall to his brothers is located in Fukusaki. He wrote about his house in one of his books, Kokyou Nanajunen (70 years in hometown): "It was the smallest house in [his] hometown." The book also describes Gataro (ガタロ), a kappa. The municipal government of Fukusaki installed a mechanical kappa statue that pops out of a pond in Tsujikawayama Park to attract tourists. In 2015, the government went on to design a kappa costume for the character Gajiro (ガジロウ), who is said to be the younger brother of Gataro. Gajiro has since been adopted as the mascot of Fukusaki. Yanagita had four brothers. One of the younger brother's name is Teruo (Eikyū), a famous Japanese traditional painter. Some of his paintings are shown in the museum. The anniversary day of Yanagita's death is held at the Santou-Ki Haiku Festival.

Kanzaki-gun Museum of History and Customs

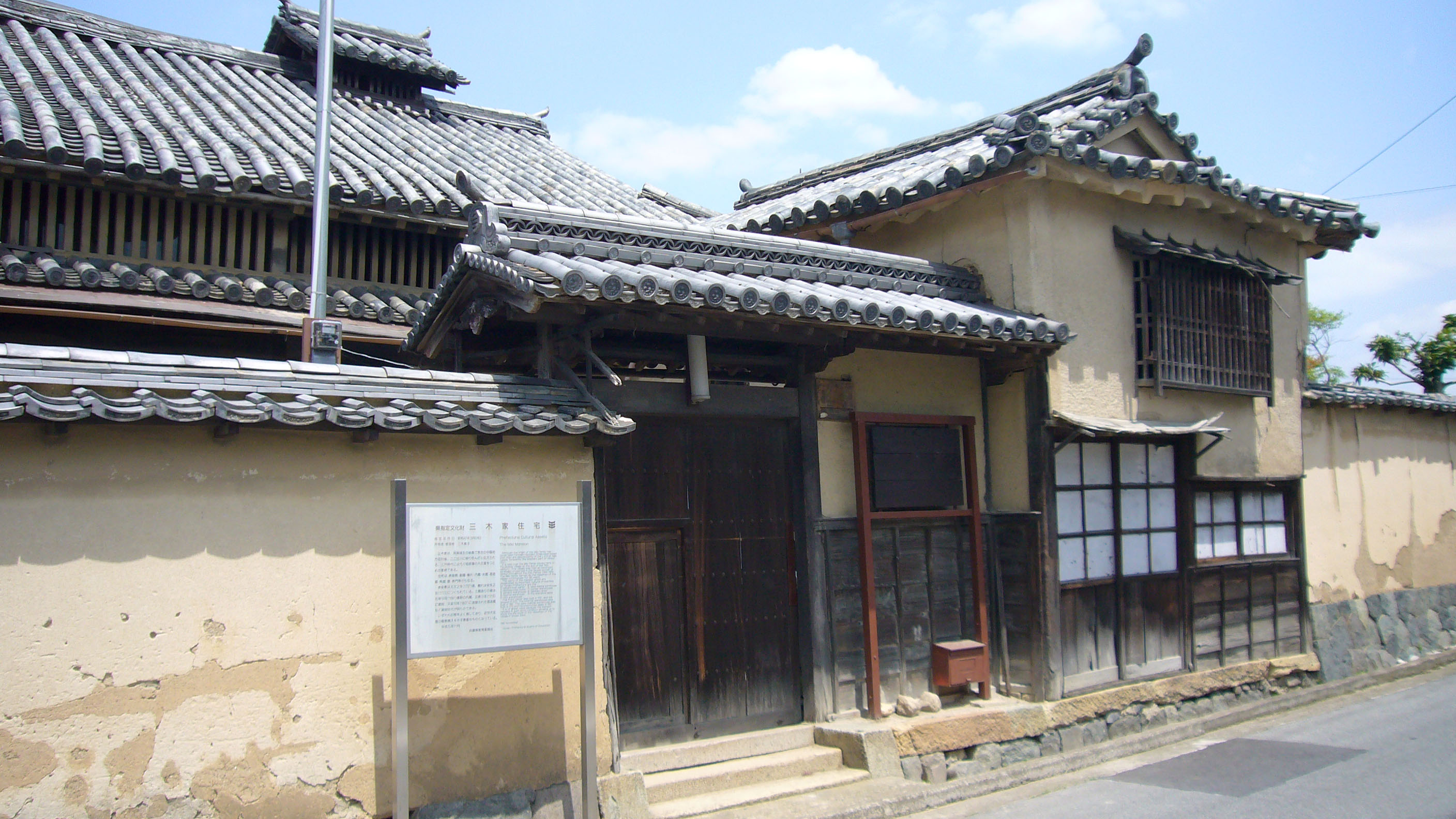
Miki house

The museum is a western-style building built in 1886. It was renovated in 1972 to a museum for keeping and promoting the development of culture.

House of the Miki family

The Miki House belonged to the great chief of Fukusaki. It is said that Kunio Yanagita read thousands of books from this family when he was a child.

Suzunomori shrine

Suzunomori shrine is in the Tsujikawa region, near Kunio Yanagita's house.

=== Festivals ===
There are two Major festivals: the Autumn Festival and Summer Festival.

During the Autumn Festival, young men carry a portable shrine and pray for a good harvest. These young men often wear 'happi'.

The Summer Festival is held on the 9th of August at the playground of Fukusaki Junior High School. There are fireworks displayed, bon dancing and drum performances. As well as food/game stalls.
