= Mount Kasagata =

Mountain in Hyōgo Prefecture, Japan

- 笠形山
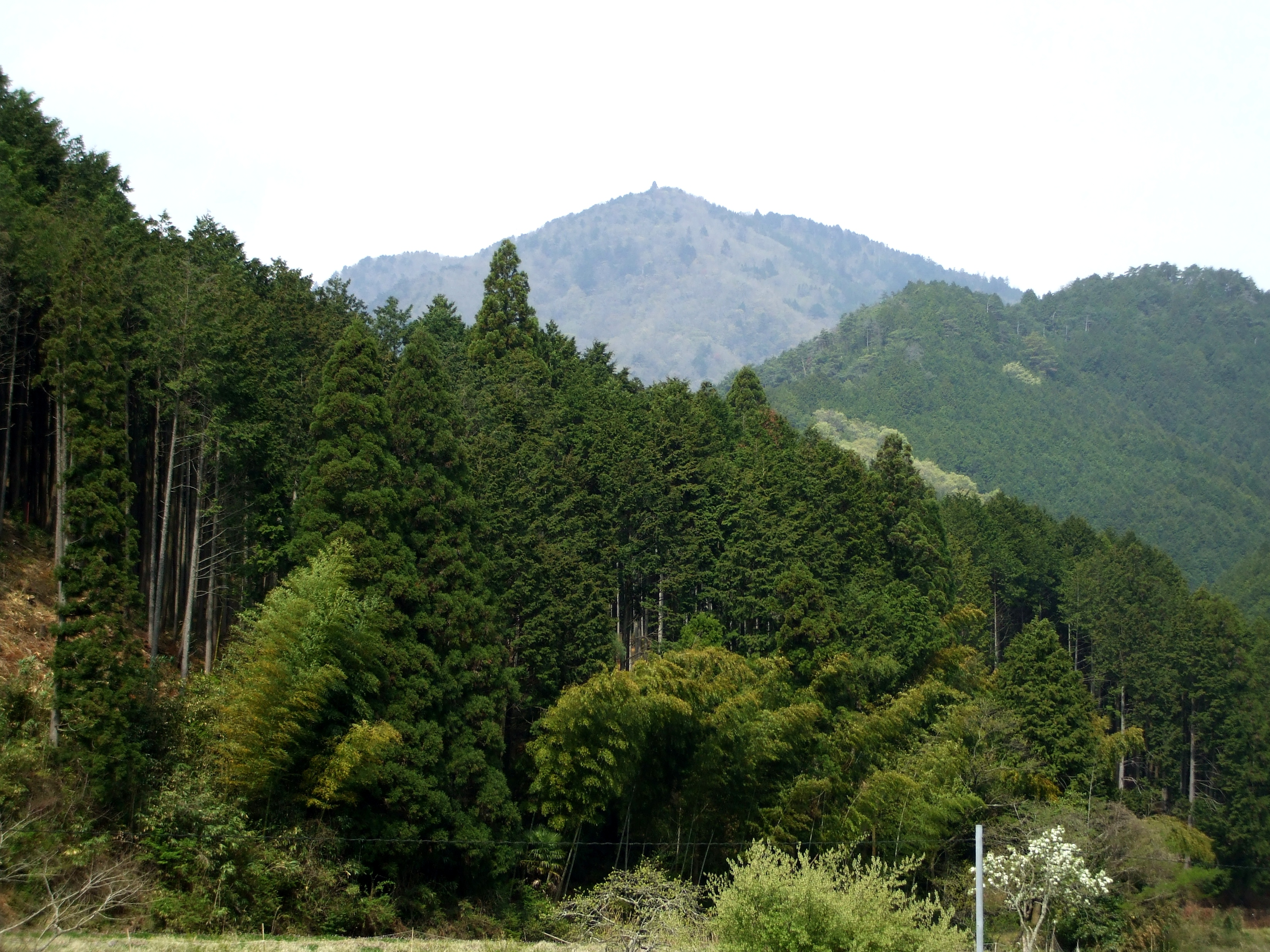
- Mount Kasagata from Ōya, Taka (April 2009)

Highest point
- Elevation: 939.4 m (3,082 ft)
- Listing: List of mountains and hills of Japan by height
- Coordinates: 35°3′51″N 134°50′5″E

Naming
- Language of name: Japanese
- Pronunciation: [kasaɡatajama]

Geography
- Location: Taka and Kamikawa, Hyōgo, Japan
- Parent range: Chūgoku Mountains

Geology
- Mountain type: fault-block

Mount Kasagata (笠形山, Kasagata-yama) is a 939.4 m (3,082 ft) mountain in the Chūgoku Mountains, located on the border of Taka and Kamikawa, Hyōgo, Japan. This mountain is one of Hyōgo 50 mountains. This mountain is an important center of Kasagatayama-Sengamine Prefectural Natural Park.

== Outline ==
Mount Kasagata is a typical fault-block mountain in this area. The name comes from the fact that the shape of the mountain is like an umbrella ('Kasa' in Japanese)..

== Route ==
There are three major routes to the top of this mountain. The most popular route is from Seka, Ichikawa. It takes one hour. Another route is from Mitani route and Iwazashin route start from Kadokura Bus Stop of Shinki Bus. It takes about two and half hours. The other routes are from Ōya, Taka and Miyono, Kamikawa.,

== Access ==
- Ōya Bus Stop of Shinki Bus
- Yamato Bus Stop of Shinnki Bus

== Gallery ==
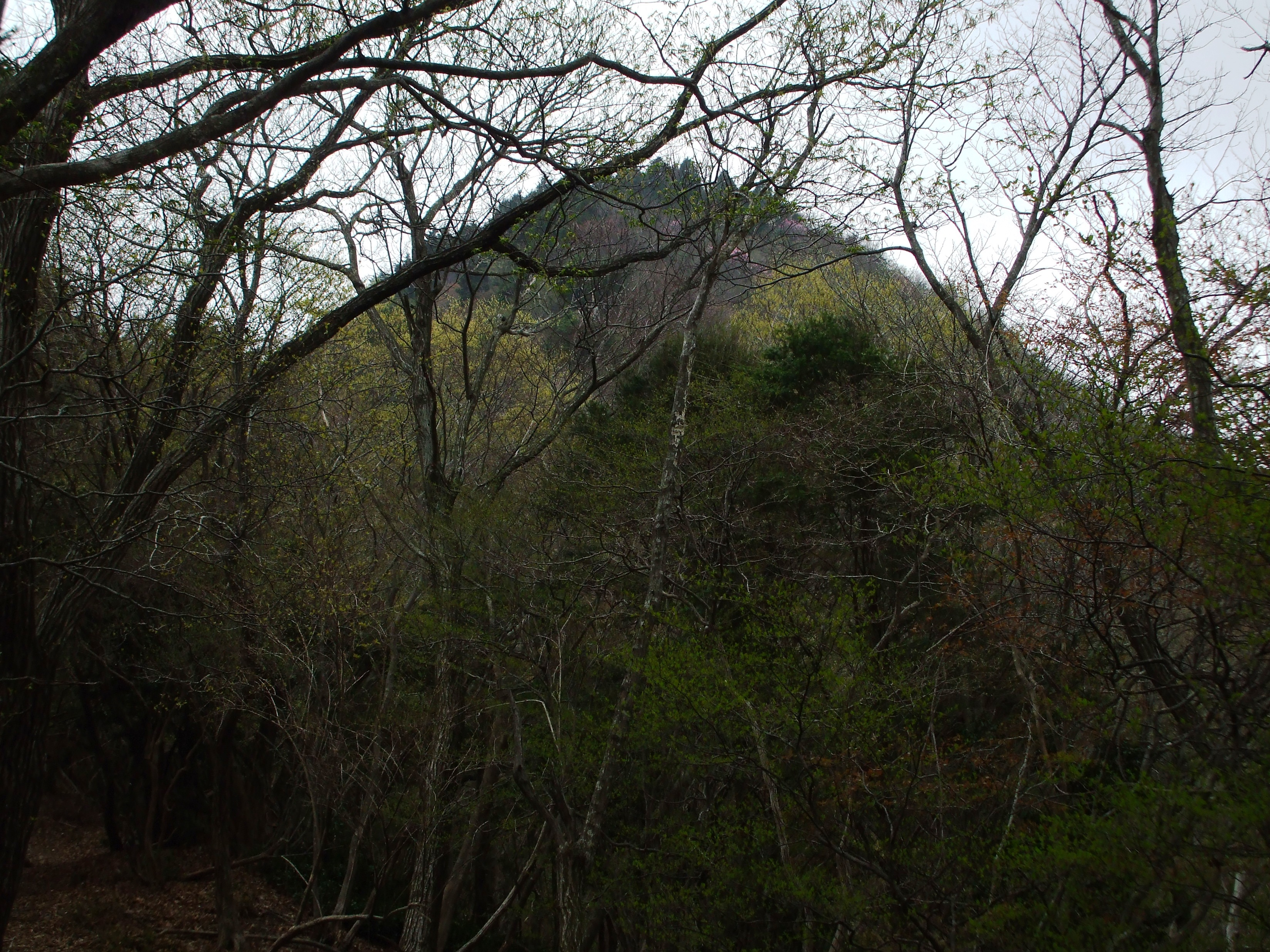
Mount Kasagata from north (4/2009)

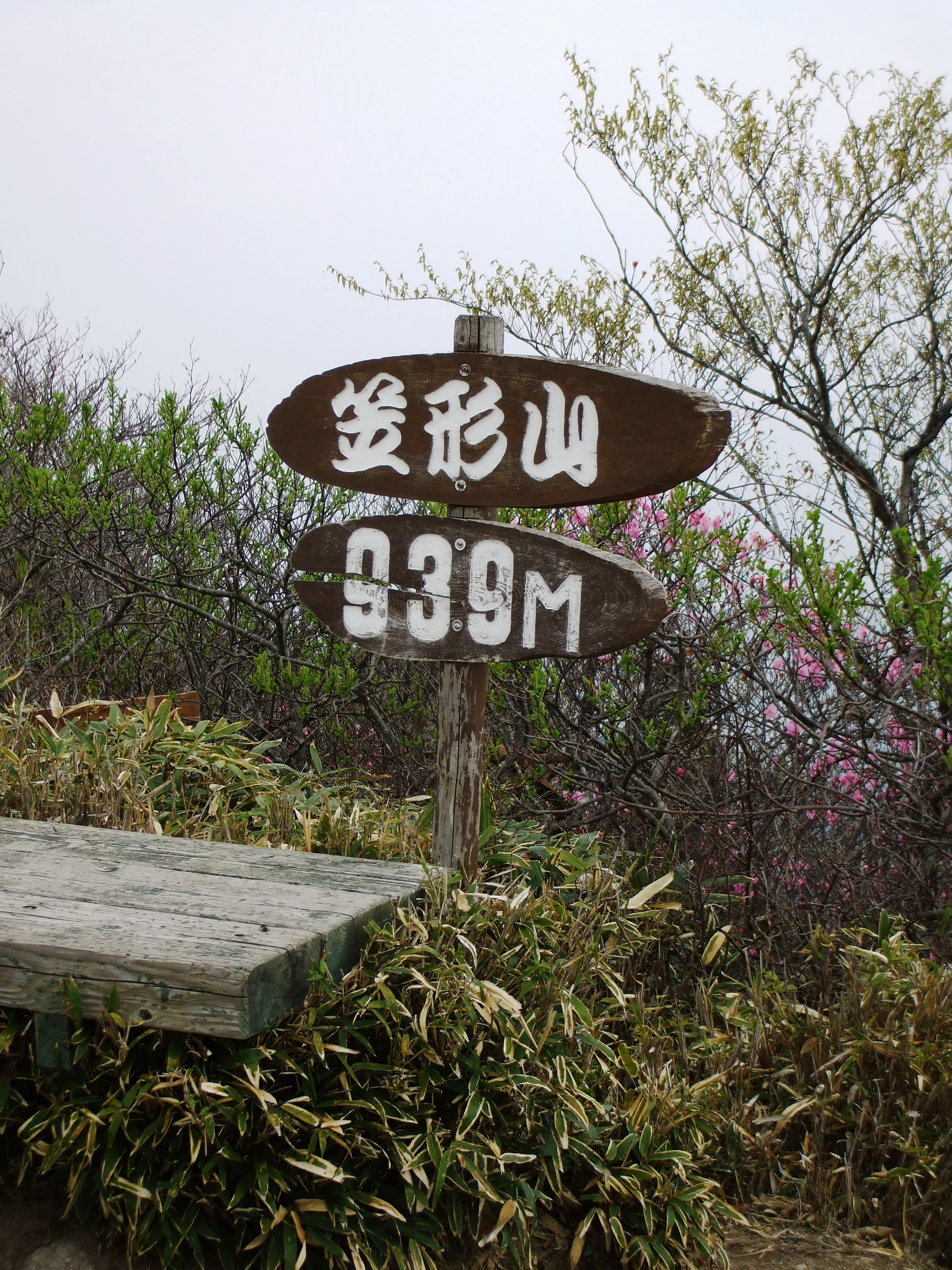
The top of Mount Kasagata (4/2009)

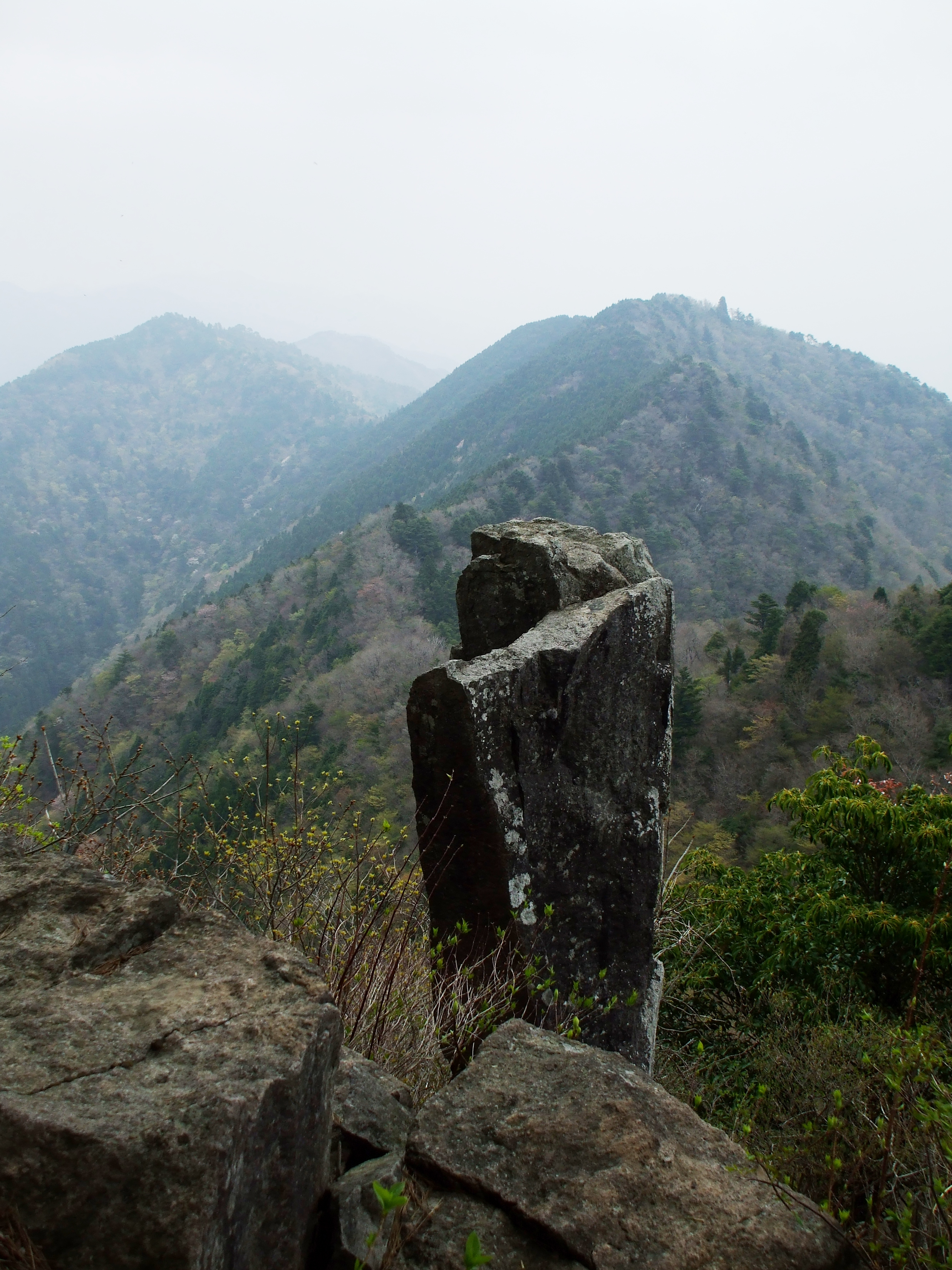
Northside view from Mount Kasagata (4/2009)

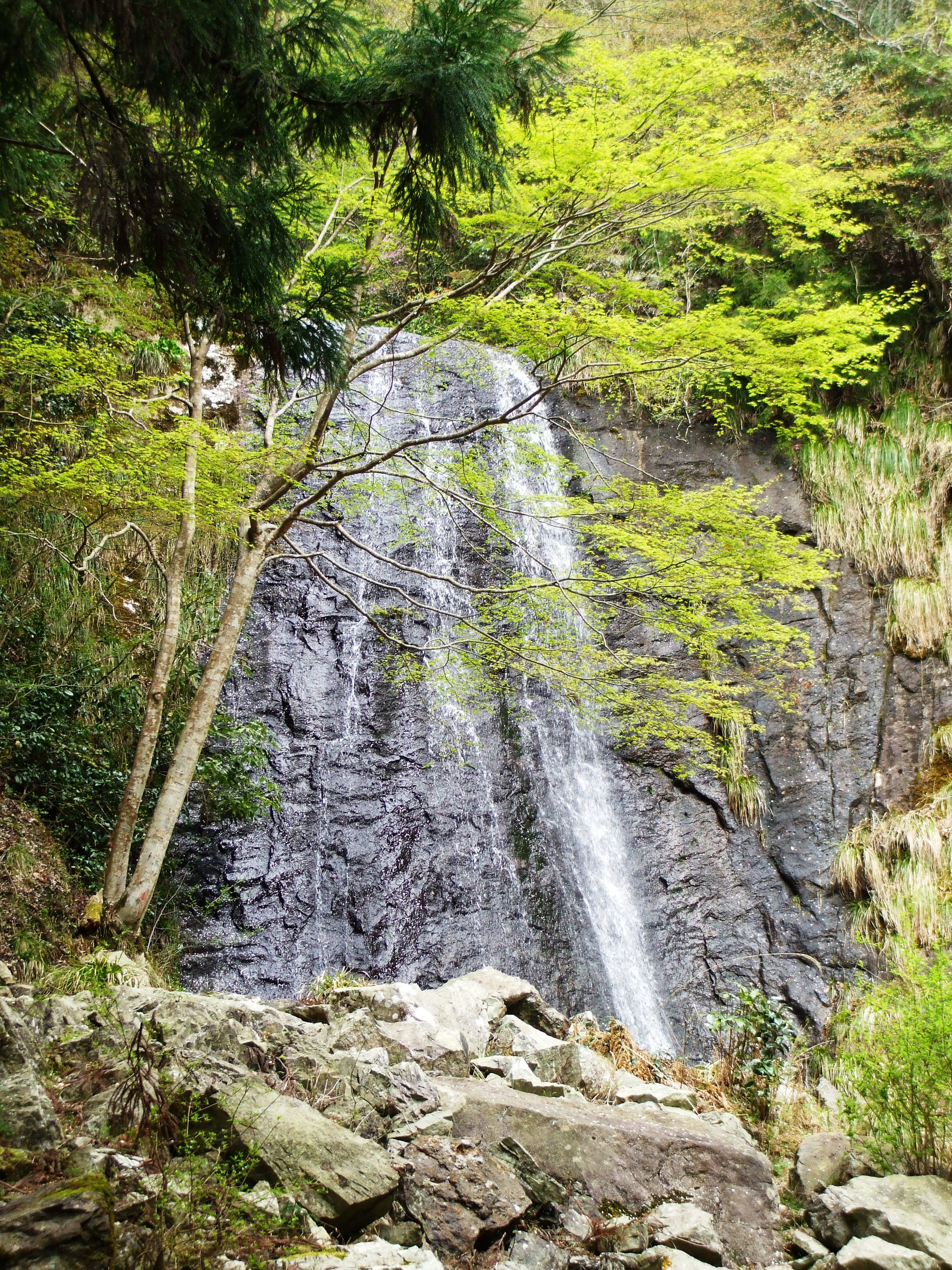
Ryugataki waterfall in Mount Kasagata (4/2009)

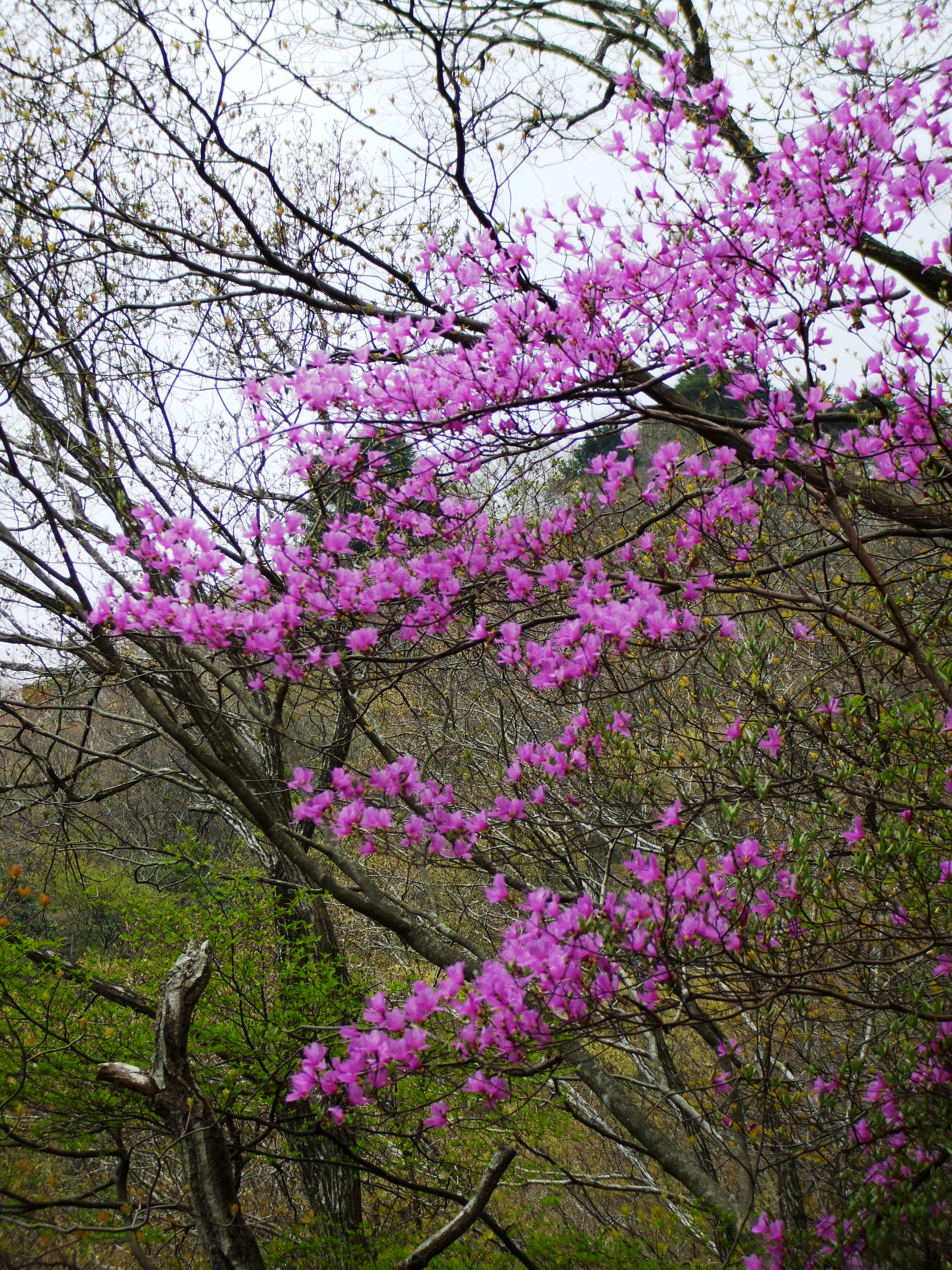
A view at Mount Kasagata (1) (4/2009)

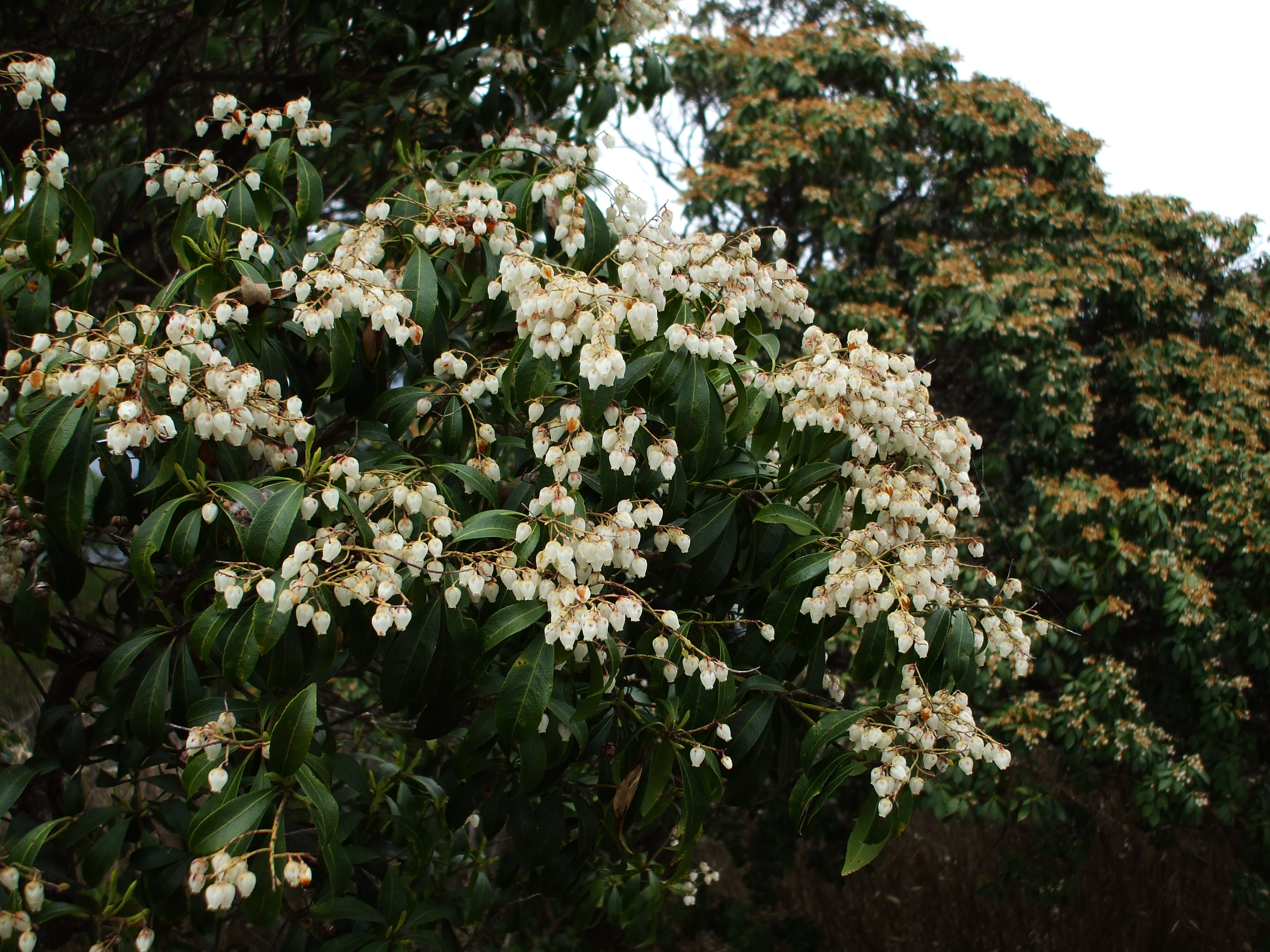
A view at Mount Kasagata (2) (4/2009)

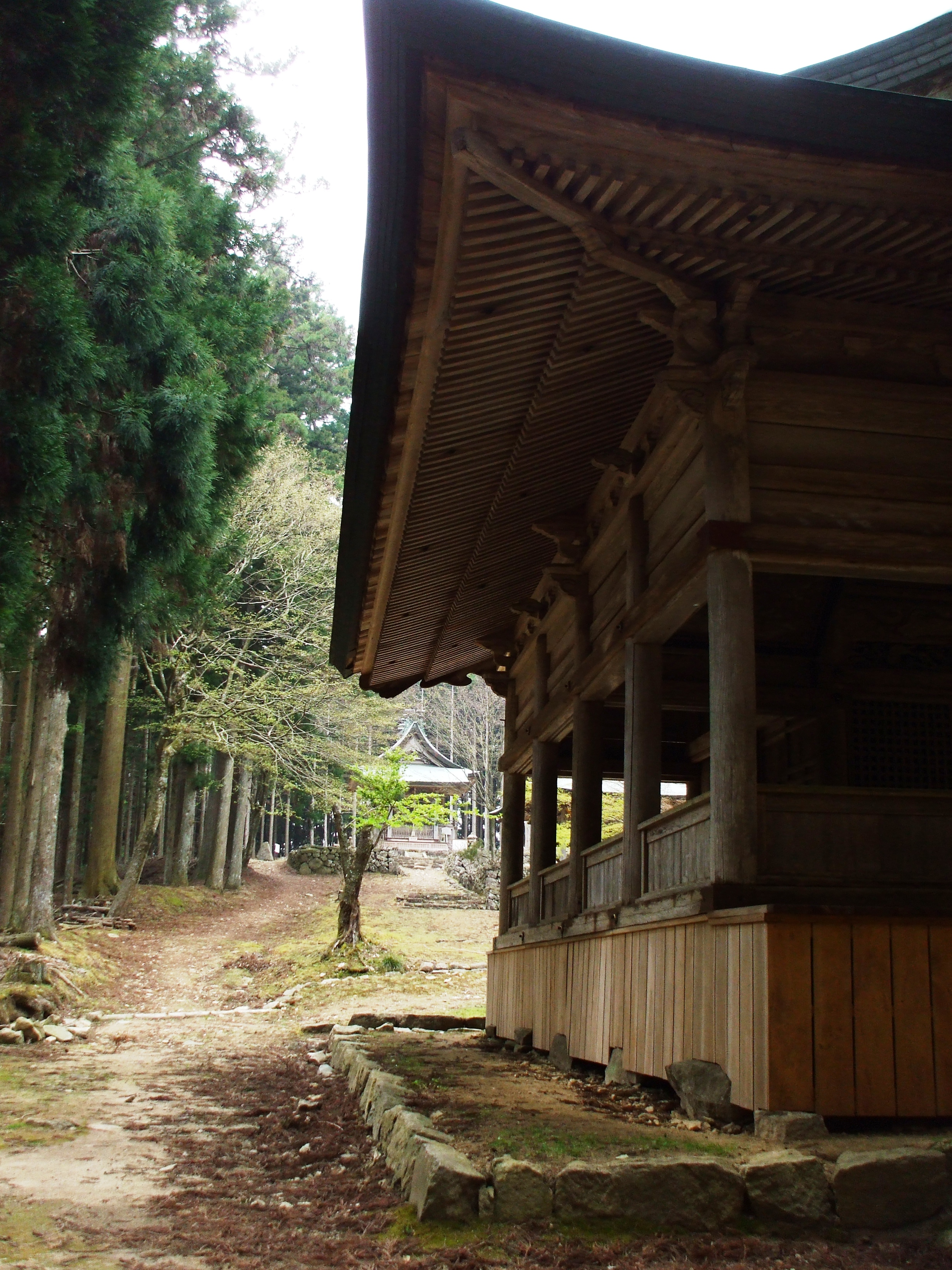
Kasagata Shrine (4/2009)

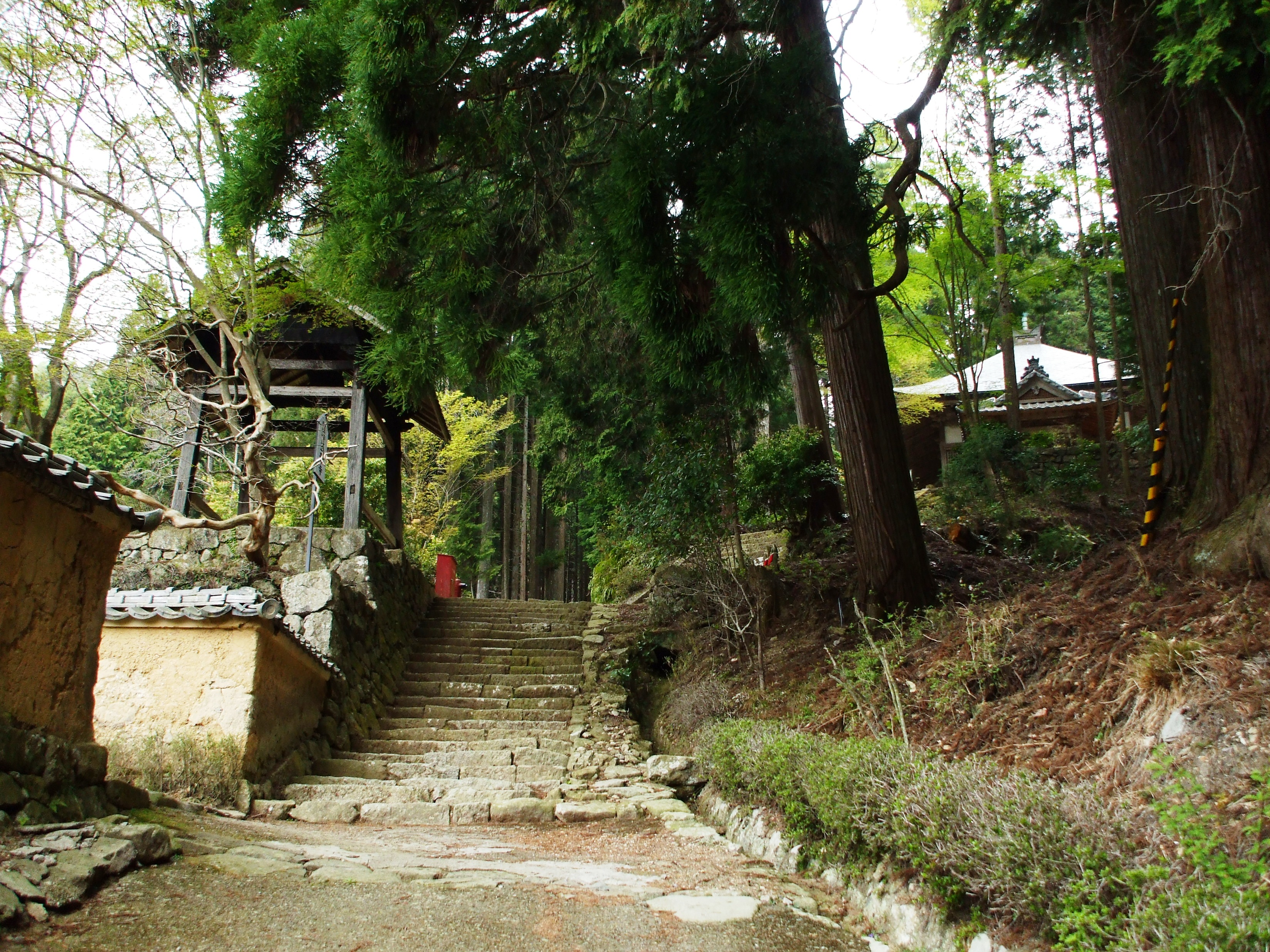
Kasagata Temple (4/2009)
