= Teramae Station =

Railway station in Kamikawa, Hyōgo Prefecture, Japan

Teramae Station 寺前駅
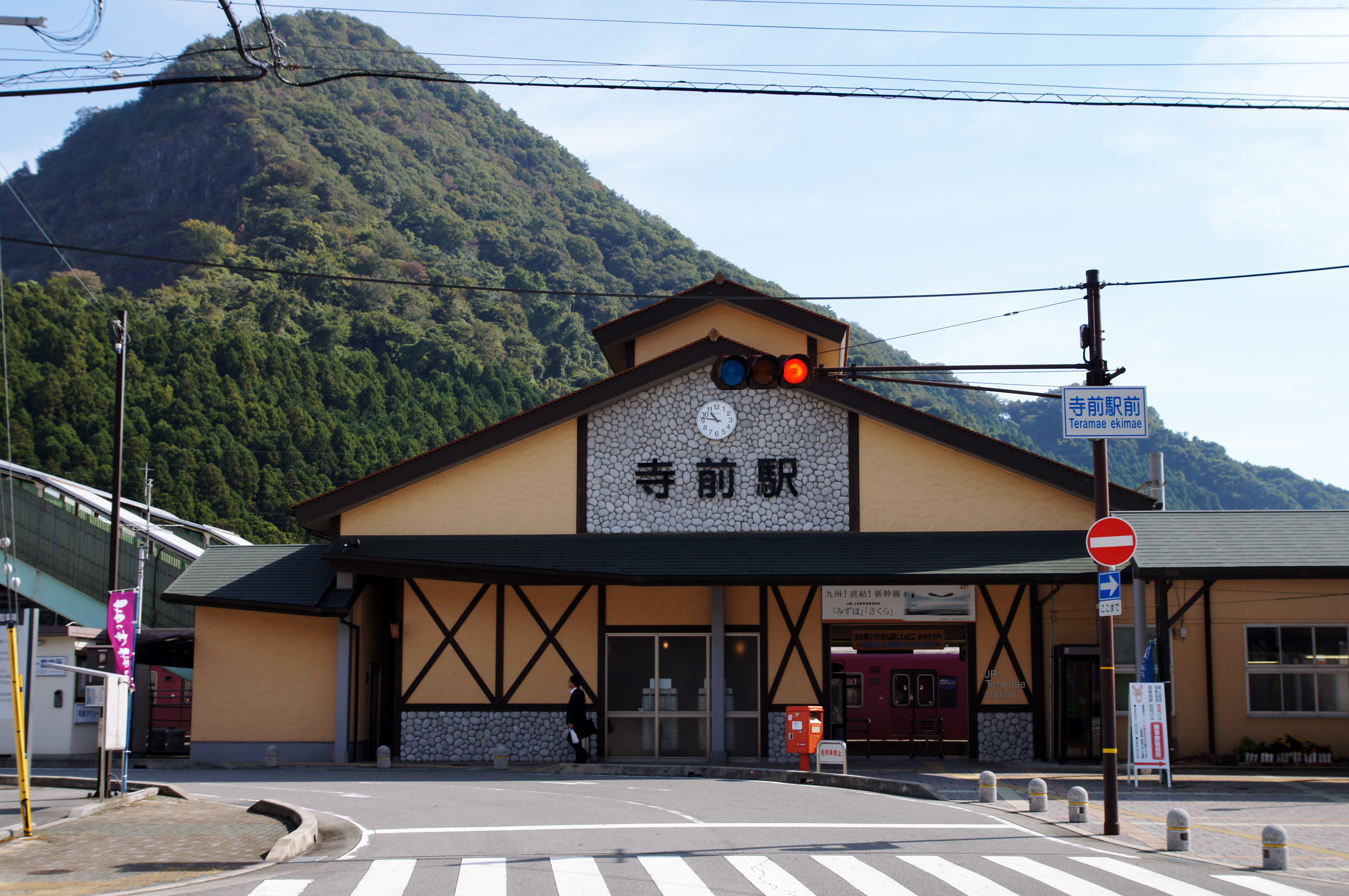
- Teramae Station building in October 2012

General information
- Location: 227-2 Niino-Nakamura, Kamikawa-chō, Kanzaki-gun, Hyōgo-ken 679-3114; Japan
- Coordinates: 35°03′56″N 134°44′36″E
- Owner: West Japan Railway Company
- Operator: West Japan Railway Company
- Line: Bantan Line
- Distance: 29.6 km (18.4 miles) from Himeji
- Platforms: 1 side + 1 island platform
- Connections: Bus stop

Other information
- Status: Staffed (Midori no Madoguchi)
- Website: Official website

History
- Opened: 25 July 1894

Passengers
- FY2016: 413 daily
Location
- Location within Hyōgo Prefecture Location within Japan

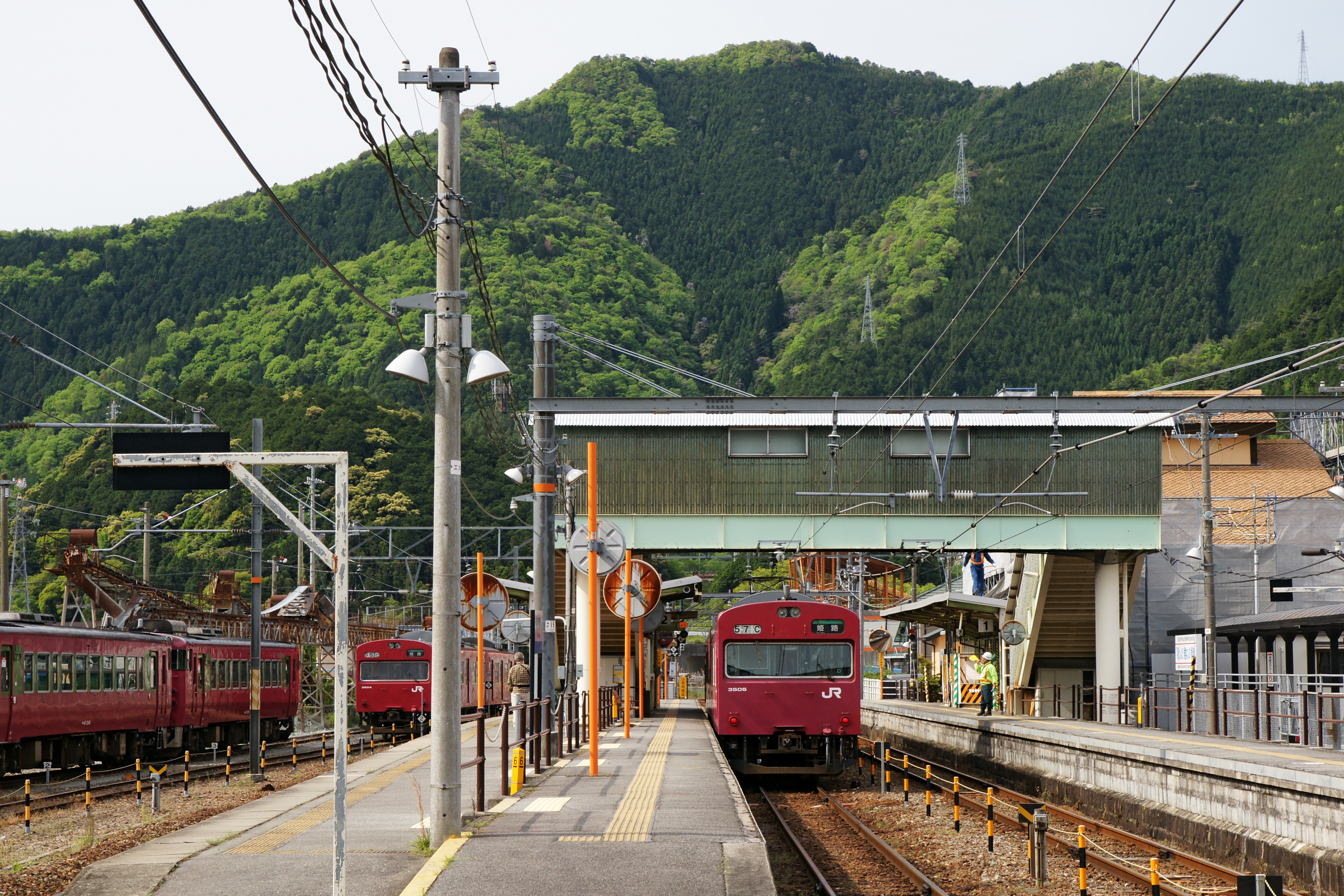
Teramae Station platforms in May 2010

Teramae Station (寺前駅, Teramae-eki) is a passenger railway station located in the town of Kamikawa, Kanzaki District, Hyōgo Prefecture, Japan, operated by West Japan Railway Company (JR West).

== Lines ==
Teramae Station is served by the Bantan Line, and is located 29.6 kilometers from the terminus of the line at Himeji.

== Station layout ==
The station consists of one side platform and one island platform connected to the station building by a footbridge. The station has a Midori no Madoguchi staffed ticket office. The platforms are used without differentiation in train operating direction. The limited express Hamakaze departs from platform 1.

=== Platforms ===
1, 2, 3	■ Bantan Line	for Wadayama for Fukusaki and Himeji

== Adjacent stations ==
«	Service	»
West Japan Railway Company
Bantan Line
Fukusaki	Limited Express Hamakaze	Ikuno
Niino	Local	Hase

== History ==
Teramae Station opened on July 26, 1894. With the privatization of the Japan National Railways (JNR) on April 1, 1987, the station came under the aegis of the West Japan Railway Company.

== Passenger statistics ==
In fiscal 2016, the station was used by an average of 413 passengers daily.

== Surrounding area ==
- Kamikawa Town Tourist Association (adjacent to the station building)
- Kamikawa Town Hall
- Kamikawa Municipal Teramae Elementary School
- Kamikawa Municipal Okochi Junior High School

== See also ==
- List of railway stations in Japan
