= Fukusaki Station =

Railway station in Fukusaki, Hyōgo Prefecture, Japan

Fukusaki Station 福崎駅
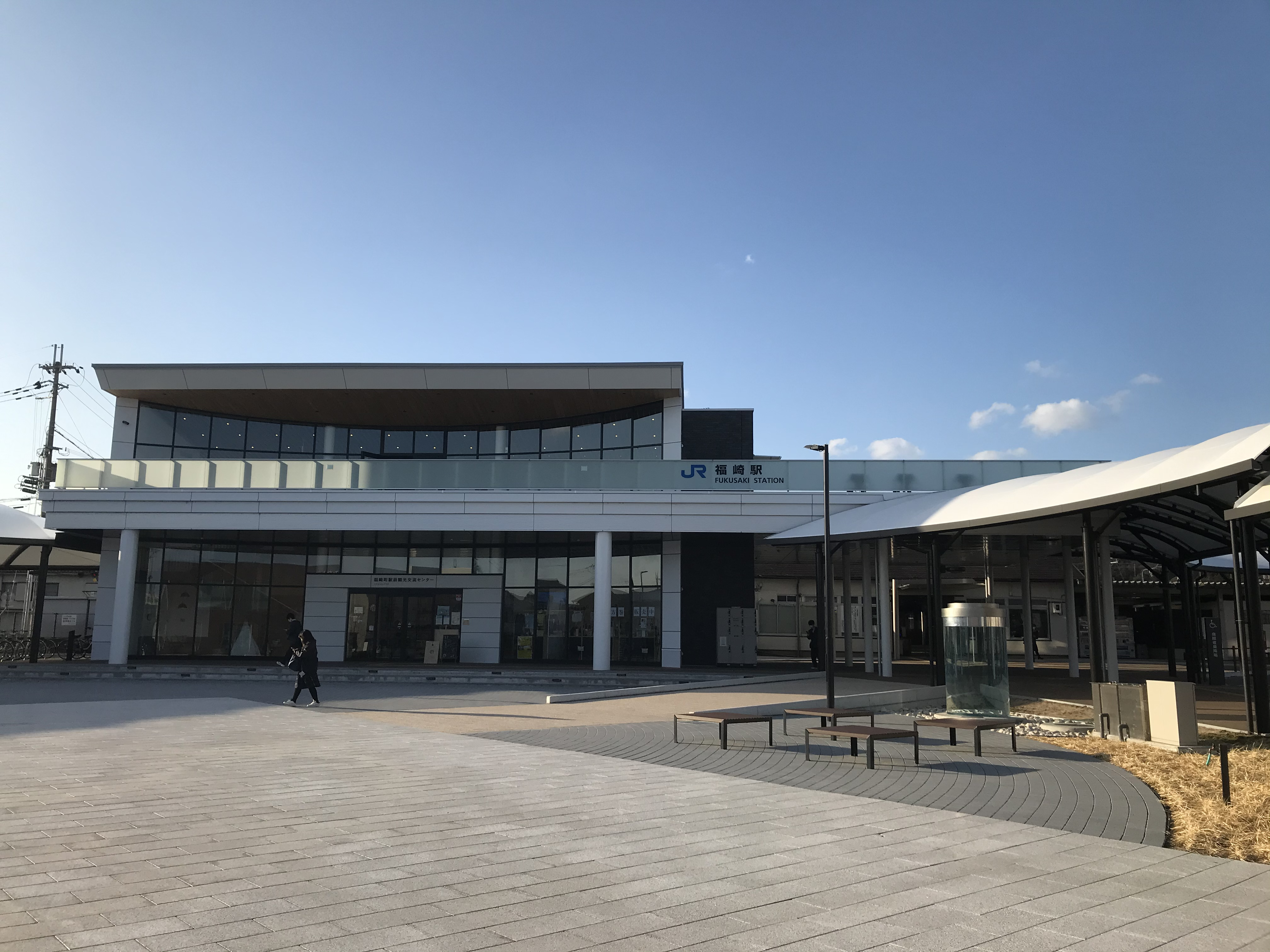
- Fukusaki Station building in February 2021

General information
- Location: Fukuda, Fukuzaki-chō, Kanzaki-gun, Hyōgo-ken 679-2212; Japan
- Coordinates: 34°57′40″N 134°45′04″E
- Owner: West Japan Railway Company
- Operator: West Japan Railway Company
- Line: Bantan Line
- Distance: 17.1 km (10.6 miles) from Himeji
- Platforms: 1 side + 1 island platform
- Connections: Bus stop

Other information
- Status: Staffed
- Website: Official website

History
- Opened: 26 July 1894

Passengers
- FY2016: 1733 daily
Location
- Location within Hyōgo Prefecture Location within Japan

Fukusaki Station (福崎駅, Fukusaki-eki) is a passenger railway station located in the town of Fukusaki, Kanzaki District, Hyōgo Prefecture, Japan, operated by West Japan Railway Company (JR West).

== Lines ==
Fukusaki Station is served by the Bantan Line, and is located 17.1 kilometers from the terminus of the line at Himeji.

== Station layout ==
The station consists of one side platform and one island platform connected to the station building by a footbridge. The station is staffed.

=== Platforms ===
1	■ Bantan Line	for Himeji
2, 3	■ Bantan Line	for Teramae, Wadayama

== Adjacent stations ==
«	Service	»
West Japan Railway Company
Bantan Line
Himeji	Limited Express Hamakaze	Teramae
Mizoguchi	Local	Amaji

== History ==
Fukusaki Station opened on July 26, 1894. With the privatization of the Japan National Railways (JNR) on April 1, 1987, the station came under the aegis of the West Japan Railway Company.

== Passenger statistics ==
In fiscal 2016, the station was used by an average of 1733 passengers daily.

== Surrounding area ==
- Hyogo Prefectural Fukusaki High School

== See also ==
- List of railway stations in Japan
