= Kanzaki District, Hyōgo =

District in Hyōgo Prefecture, Japan

Kanzaki district

Kanzaki (神崎郡, Kanzaki-gun) is a district located in Hyōgo Prefecture, Japan.

As of 2003, the district has an estimated population of 67,363 and a density of 185.93 persons per km^{2}. The total area is 362.31 km^{2}.

== Towns and villages ==
- Fukusaki 34°57′01″N 134°45′37″E
- Ichikawa 34°59′22″N 134°45′47″E
- Kamikawa 35°03′51″N 134°44′22″E

== Merger ==
- On November 7, 2005, the towns of Kanzaki and Ōkawachi merged to form the new town of Kamikawa.
- On March 27, 2006, the town of Kōdera merged into the city of Himeji.
