= 新井駅 =

新井駅 may refer to:

- Arai Station (disambiguation)
  - Arai Station (Niigata)
- Nii Station (disambiguation)
  - Nii Station (Hyōgo)
