= 竹田駅 =

竹田駅 or 竹田驛 may refer to:

- Jukjeon station
- Jukjeon station (Daegu Metro)
- Takeda Station (disambiguation)
  - Takeda Station (Hyōgo)
  - Takeda Station (Kyoto)
