= Asago Gunzan Prefectural Natural Park =

Natural park of Hyogo prefecture, Japan

- 朝来群山県立自然公園
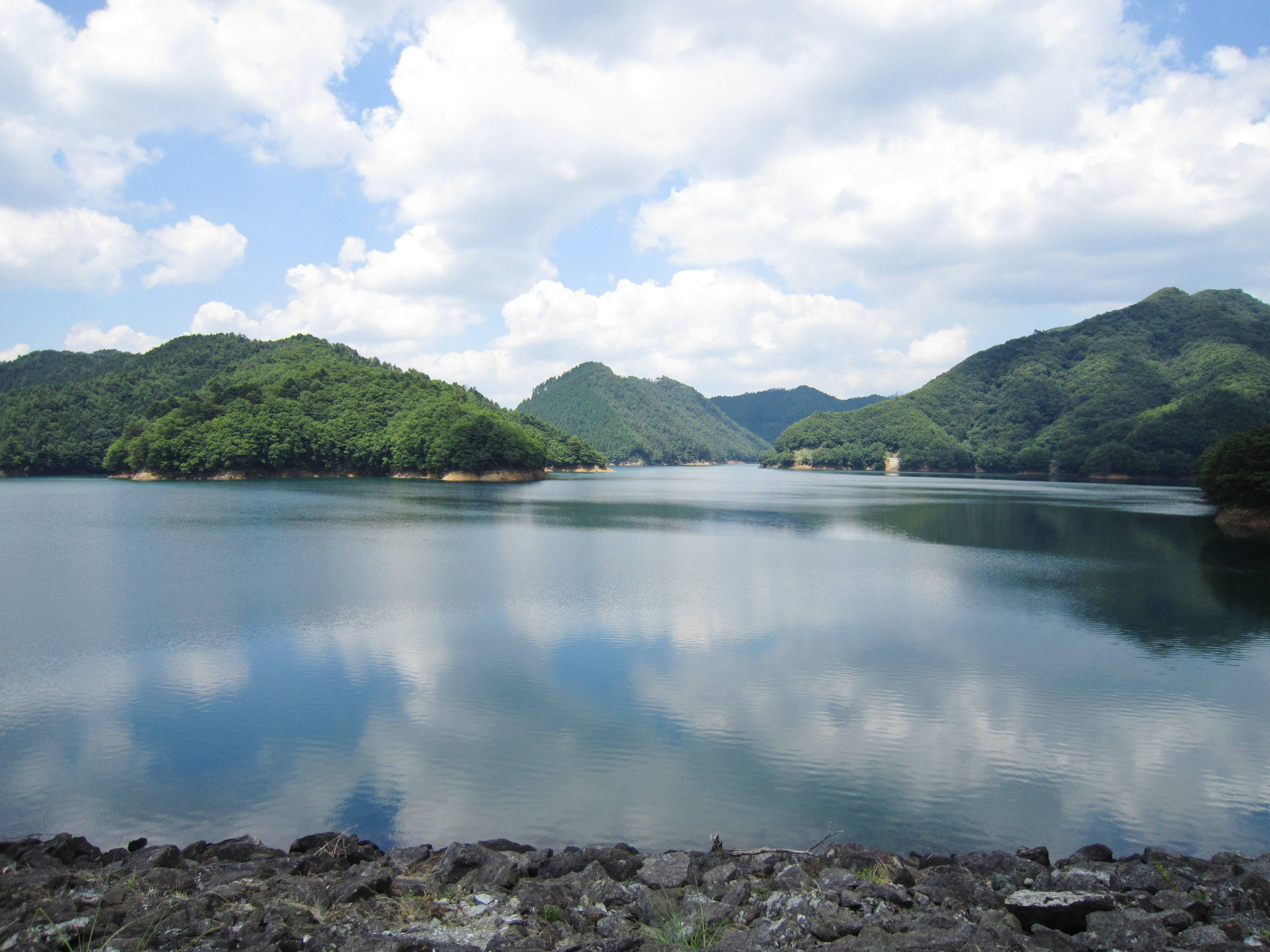
- Lake Kurokawa
- Interactive map of Asago Gunzan Prefectural Natural Park
- Location: Hyōgo Prefecture, Japan
- Coordinates: 35°14′02″N 134°52′46″E
- Area: 147.66 km^{2} (57.01 sq mi)
- Established: 21 November 1958

Asago Gunzan Prefectural Natural Park (朝来群山県立自然公園, Asago Gunzan kenritsu shizen kōen) is a Prefectural Natural Park in eastern Hyōgo Prefecture, Japan. Established in 1958, the park spans the municipalities of Asago, Taka, and Tamba.

== See also ==
- National Parks of Japan
