= Ikuno (disambiguation) =

Ikuno, Hyōgo is a dissolved municipality in Asago District

Ikuno may also refer to:

- Ikuno Korea Town
- Ikuno-ku, Osaka
- Ikuno Station (Hyōgo)
- Ikuno Station (Hokkaido)
- Ikuno Dam
