= Hase Station =

Hase Station may refer to either of the following railway stations in Japan:

- Hase Station (Kanagawa) on the Enoshima Electric Railway
- Hase Station (Hyōgo) on the Bantan Line
