= Takeda Castle =

Castle ruins in Asago, Japan

- 竹田城
- Asago, Hyōgo, Japan
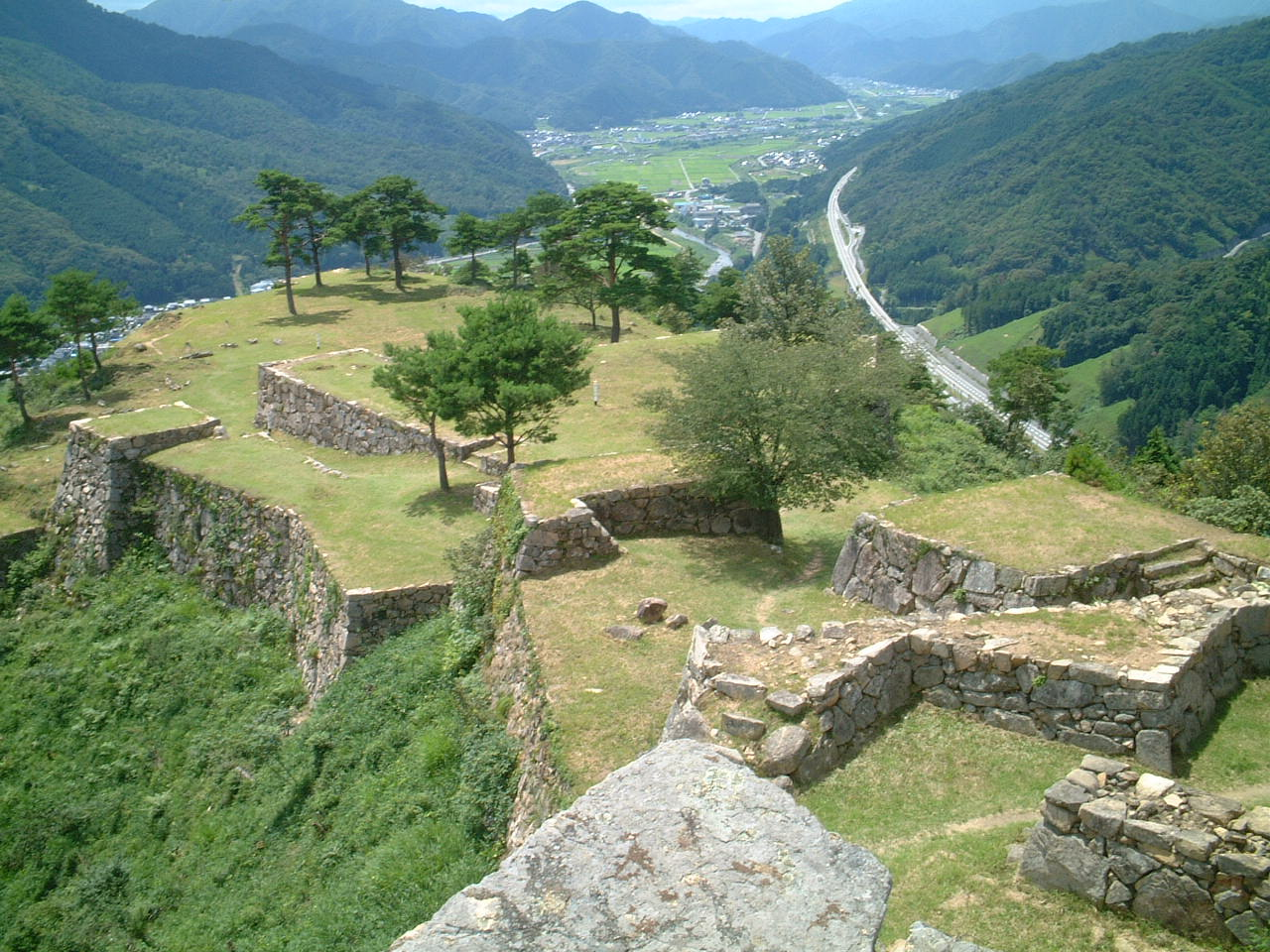
- Takeda Castle

Site information
- Type: Mountaintop-style castle
- Owner: Yamana clan
- Condition: ruins

Location
- Takeda Castle
- Location within Hyōgo Prefecture Location within Japan
- Coordinates: 35°18′00″N 134°49′44″E

Site history
- Built: c.1441
- Built by: Otagaki Mitsukage
- Materials: Stone walls
- Demolished: 1600
- National Historic Site of Japan

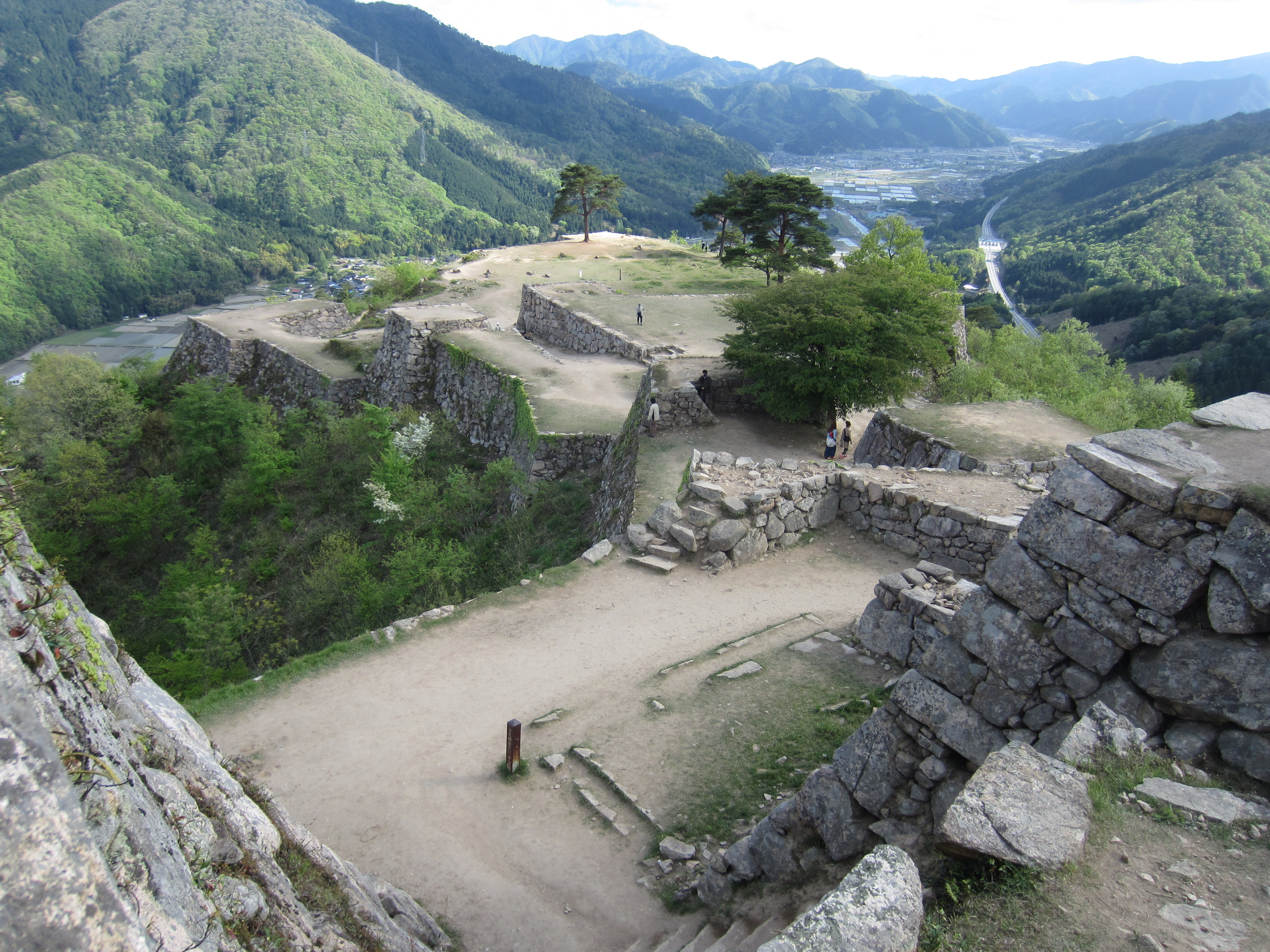
Ruins of Takeda Castle

Takeda Castle (竹田城, Takeda-jō) was a Sengoku period Japanese castle located in the Wadayama neighborhood of the city of Asago, in the northern part of Hyōgo Prefecture, Japan. It is located north of Himeji, and north-west of Kyoto, and is situated some 353 metres above sea level It is often referred to locally as the "Machu Picchu of Japan". The castle was destroyed during the Sengoku period, only its foundations and stone walls remain. The ruins have been protected as a National Historic Site since 1943.

== History ==
Takeda Castle is located on Mount Shiroyama at a strategic location commanding the intersection of the San'indo highway from Tanba to Inaba Province connects with the road south to Harima Province and the Seto Inland Sea. The castle is also close to the Ikuno mine, one of the largest silver mines in Japan during the Muromachi period.

The area came under the control of the Yamana clan, a cadet branch of the Nitta clan, in the Muromachi period. The Yamana clan had close relations with the Ashikaga shogunate and was one of four clans with hereditary rights to the position of Samurai-dokoro. The Yamana leveraged their position to eventually claim the position of shugo over 11 of the 66 provinces of Japan. However, the Ashikaga grew fearful of the expanding power of the clan, and Shogun Ashikaga Yoshimitsu encouraged internal conflicts within the clan and sponsored the Hosokawa clan in its position of kanrei to offset the Yamana. By the middle of the 15th century, the power the Ashikaga shogunate began to decline, and a succession dispute within the shogunate led to the Ōnin War from 1467 to 1477.

Takeda Castle was built during this period by Otagaki Mitsukage, a retainer of Yamana Sōzen, in 1441; however, many details are unclear and this date is uncertain. The year 1441 is the year when Shogun Ashikaga Yoshinori was assassinated by the Akamatsu clan. The Yamana clan and the Akamatsu clan went into war against one another, and Takeda Castle was constructed both to protect the Ikuno mine, but also to guard the border between Akamatsu-held Harima and Yamana-held Tajima. In 1468, a large Hosokawa clan army was defeated by Yamana forces led by Otagaki Mitsukage from Takeda Castle. The Ōnin War weakened the Yamana clan as the conflict extended into decades. Even within their strongholds Tajima itself, the Yamana mostly became nominal overlords as local retainers (such as the Otagaki) gained much independence. Under these circumstances, the clan was defeated in 1576 by Toyotomi Hideyoshi. Yamana Suketoyo managed to escape to Sakai and was pardoned by Nobunaga in 1570, and allowed to return to his ancestral territory in Tajima. Although he served Nobunaga loyally, in 1580 when Toyotomi Hideyoshi was fighting the Mōri clan, the Otagaki clan, defected to the enemy. Hideyoshi charged the Yamana with treason, and attacked Arikoyama Castle, ending the power of the clan. Hideyoshi assigned the area to his younger brother, Toyotomi Hidenaga.

Hidenaga appointed his general Kuwaharu Shigeharu (1524-1606) as castellan, but after Hidenaga was transferred to Yamato Province, Hideyoshi placed Akamatsu Hirohide (1562-1600) as a governor of this castle. Under Hirohide, Takeda Castle was significantly reconstructed. Akamatsu retained the basic layout: from the summit of the mountain, three ridges extend outwards, and each ridge was shaped by enclosures which made extensive use of the natural terrain. Akamatsu added stone walls and dry moats.

After the death of Hideyoshi, Akamatsu was initially loyal to the Toyotomi side, but after the Battle of Sekigahara, changed his fealty to Tokugawa Ieyasu. Ordered to attack Tottori Castle, he was accused of setting fire to the jokamachi during the siege and was forced to commit seppuku. Takeda Castle was destroyed at this time, but the foundations and stone walls were allowed to remain relatively intact.

Due to its mountaintop location, often above the cloud layer, the castle ruins have become a popular tourist attraction. It is located a 60-minute walk from Takeda Station on the JR West Bantan Line, but the climb is very steep.

Takeda Castle was listed as one of Japan's Top 100 Castles by the Japan Castle Foundation in 2006.

== Gallery ==
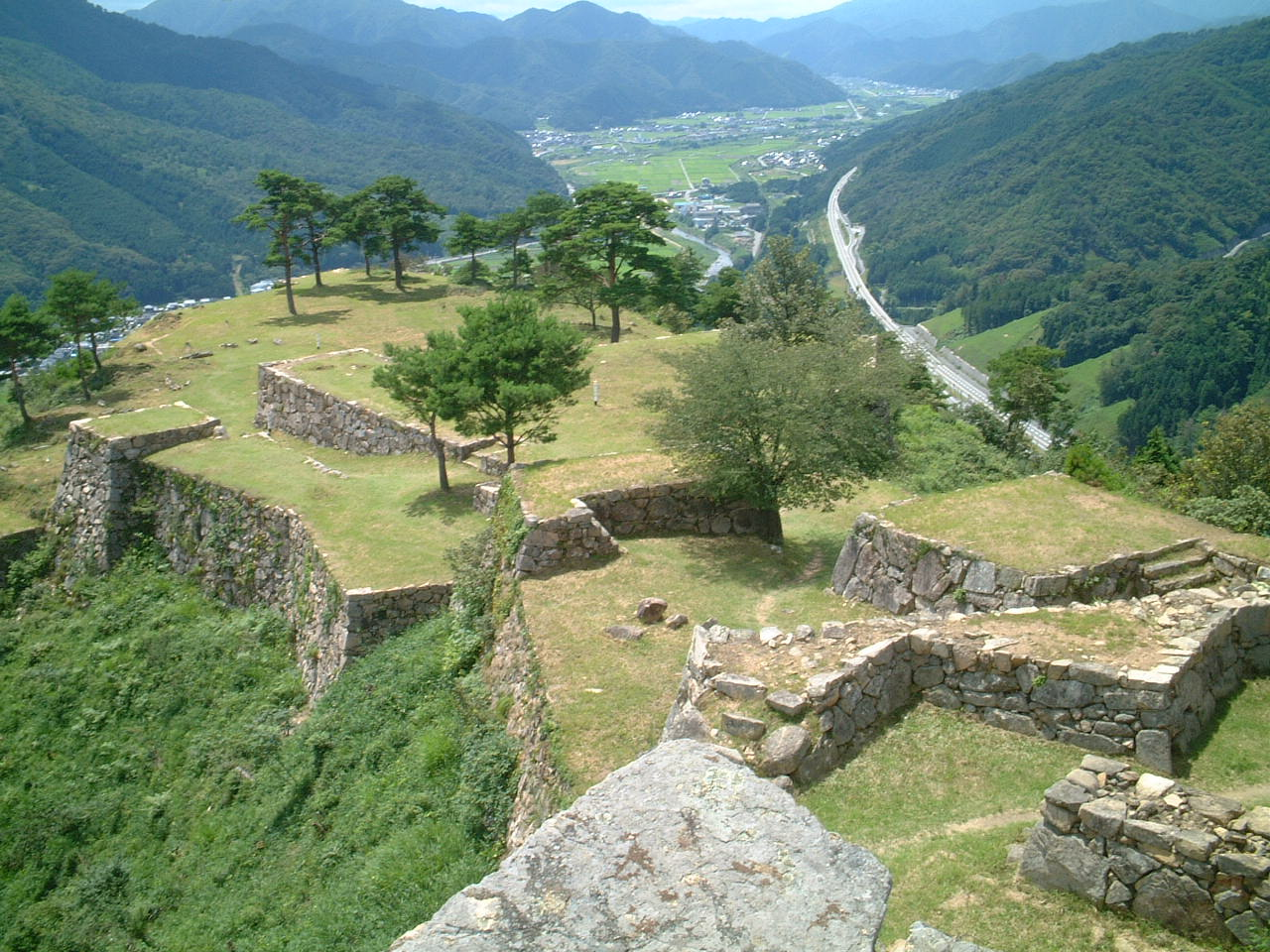
Takeda Castle

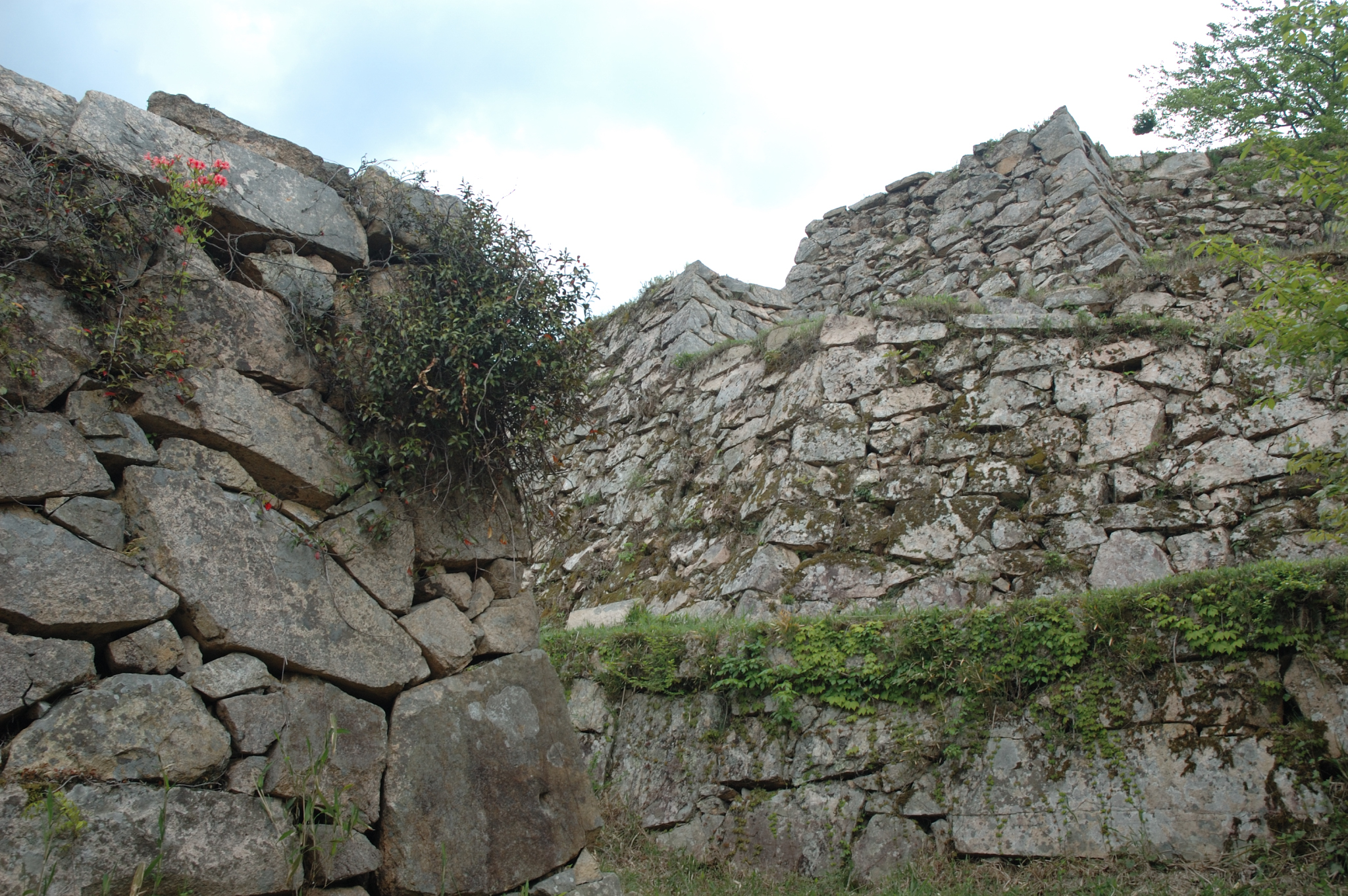
Stone wall of Hanayashiki compound

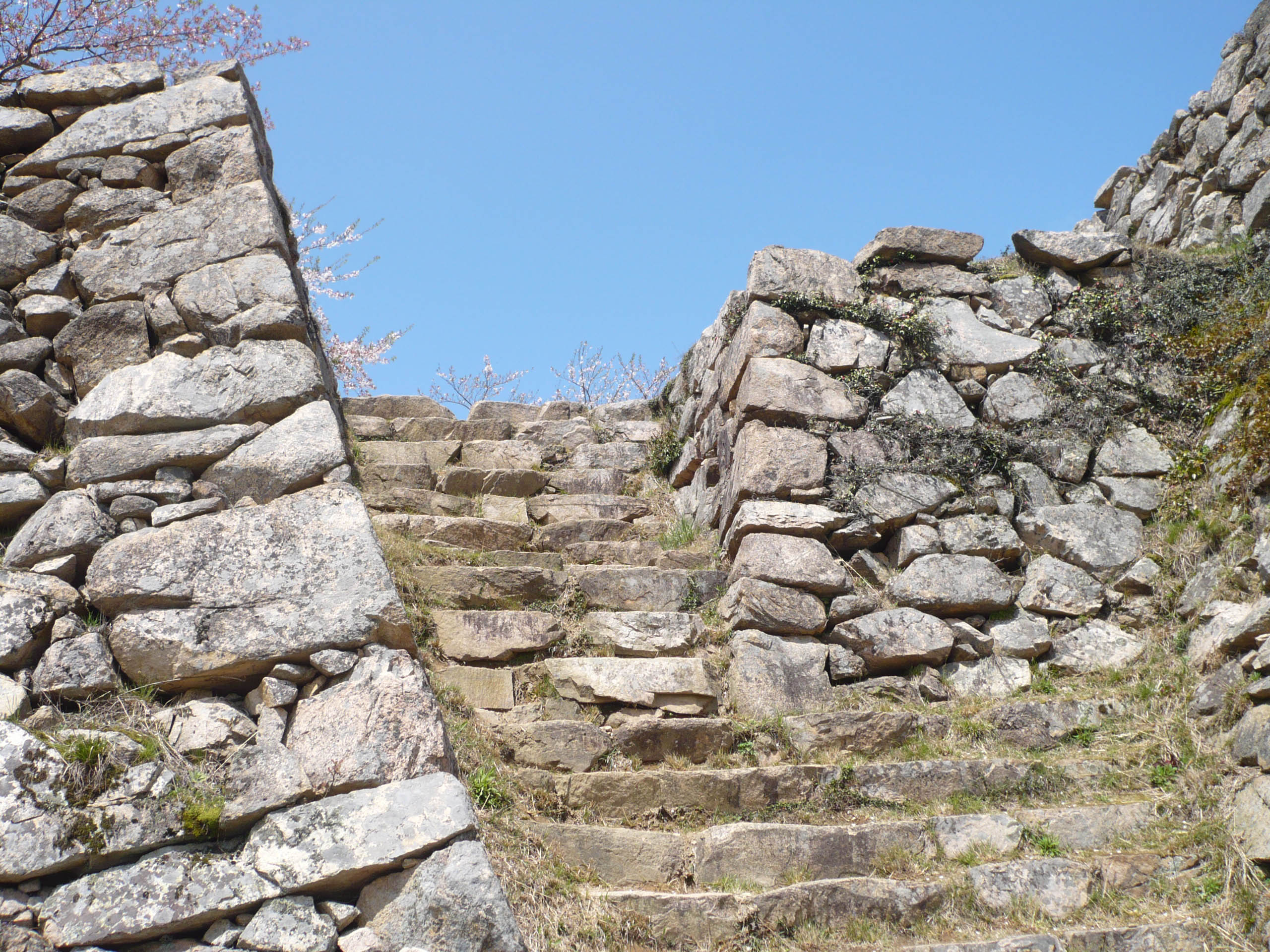
Gate of Tenshu tower

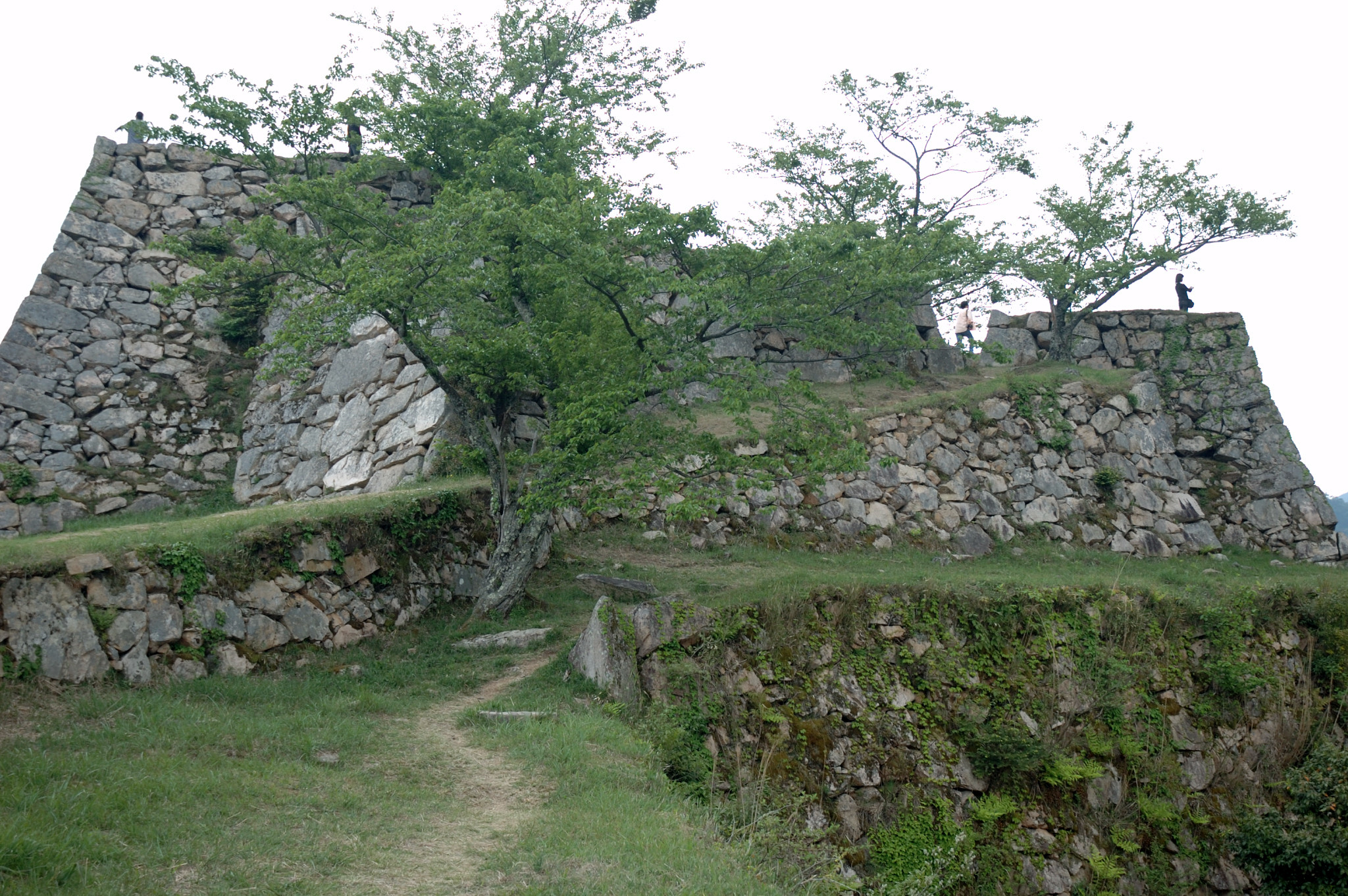
Honmaru compound

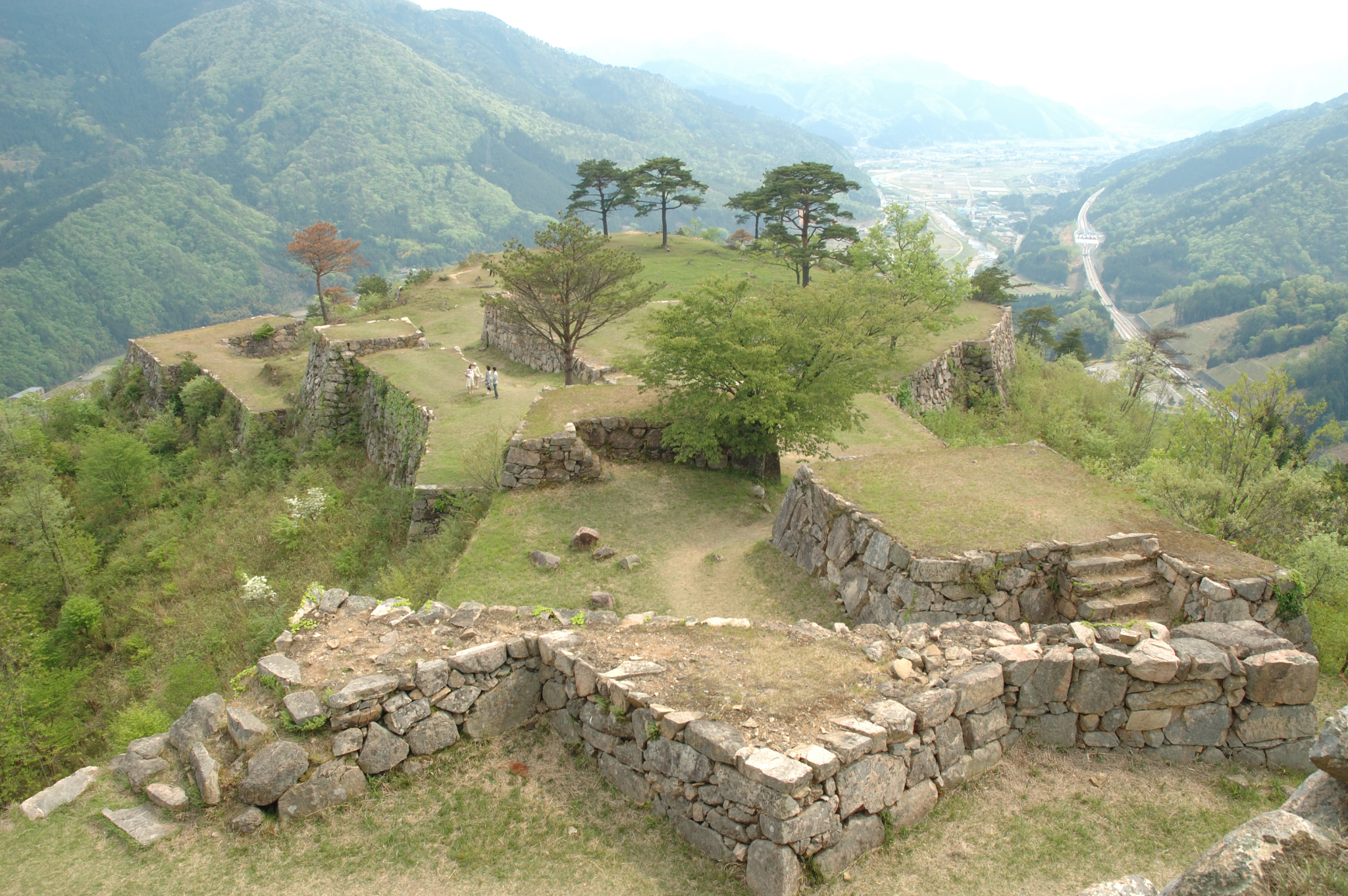
Minami Senjojiki compound

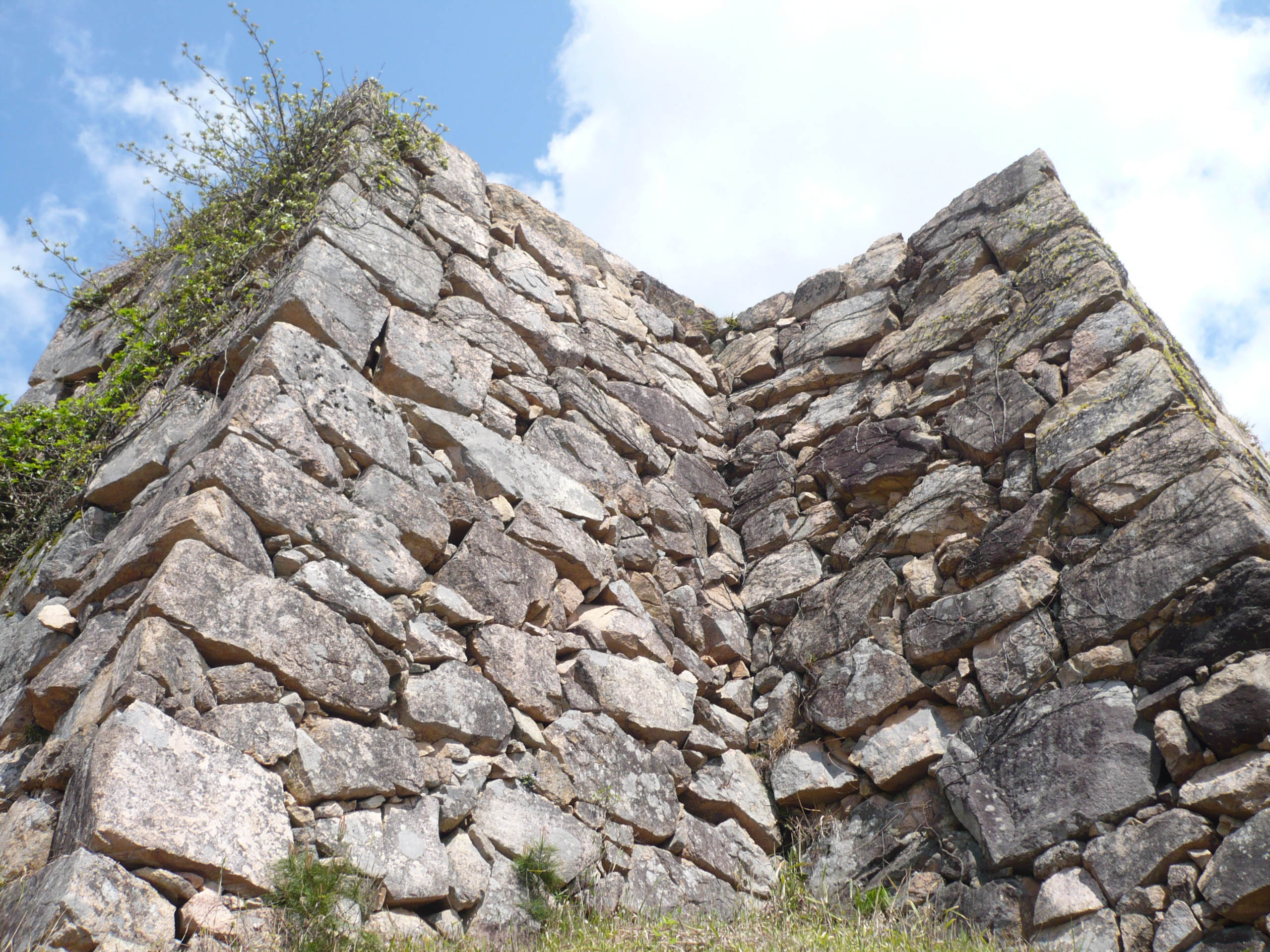
Stone wall of Mitsukeyagura tower

== Literature ==
- De Lange, William (2021). An Encyclopedia of Japanese Castles. Groningen: Toyo Press. pp. 600 pages. ISBN 978-9492722300.
