= Kyōguchi Station =

Railway station in Himeji, Hyōgo Prefecture, Japan

Kyōguchi Station 京口駅
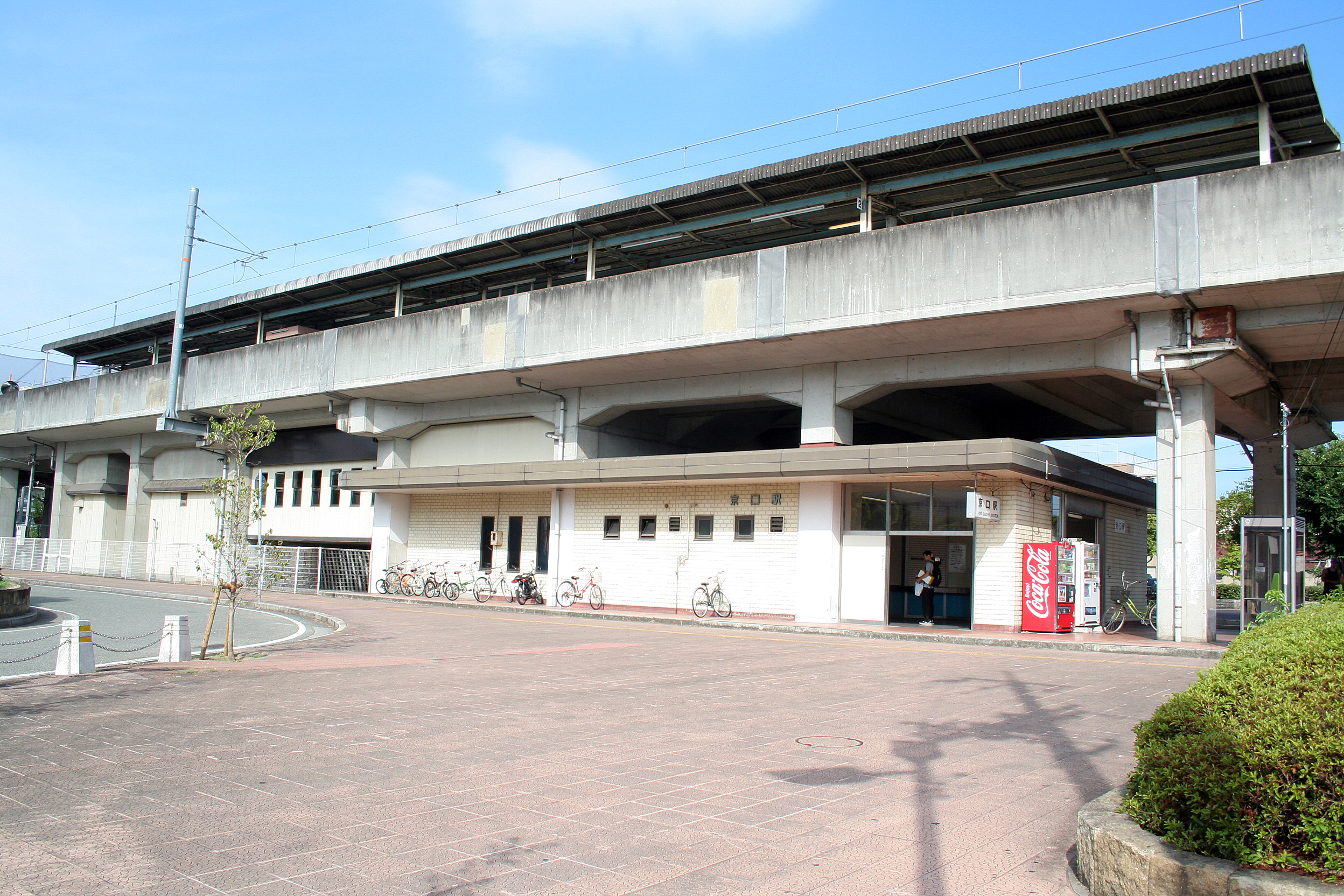
- Kyōguchi Station in August 2010

General information
- Location: 418-2 Kitakamiya, Jōtomachi,, Himeji-shi, Hyōgo-ken 670-0851; Japan
- Coordinates: 34°50′05″N 134°42′20″E
- Owner: West Japan Railway Company
- Operator: West Japan Railway Company
- Line: Bantan Line
- Distance: 1.7 km (1.1 miles) from Himeji
- Platforms: 1 island platforms
- Connections: Bus stop

Other information
- Status: Unstaffed
- Website: Official website

History
- Opened: 18 February 1898

Passengers
- FY2016: 1034 daily
Location
- Location within Hyōgo Prefecture Location within Japan

Kyōguchi Station (京口駅, Kyōguchi-eki) is a passenger railway station located in the city of Himeji, Hyōgo Prefecture, Japan, operated by West Japan Railway Company (JR West).

== Lines ==
Kyōguchi Station is served by the Bantan Line, and is located 1.7 kilometers from the terminus of the line at Himeji.

== Station layout ==
The station consists of one elevated island platform with the station building underneath. The station is unattended.

=== Platforms ===
1	■ Bantan Line	for Himeji
2	■ Bantan Line	for Teramae, Wadayama

== Adjacent stations ==
«	Service	»
West Japan Railway Company
Bantan Line
Limited Express Hamakaze: Does not stop at this station
Himeji	Local	Nozato

== History ==
Kyōguchi Station opened on February 18, 1898. With the privatization of the Japan National Railways (JNR) on April 1, 1987, the station came under the aegis of the West Japan Railway Company.

== Passenger statistics ==
In fiscal 2016, the station was used by an average of 1034 passengers daily.

== Surrounding area ==
- Himeji City Joto Elementary School
- Himeji City Toko Junior High School
- Junshin Gakuin Junior and Senior High School
- Himeji Chamber of Commerce
- Himeji City Cultural Convention Center (Acrier Himeji)
- Hyogo Prefectural Harima Himeji General Medical Center

== See also ==
- List of railway stations in Japan
