= Hase Station (Hyōgo) =

Railway station in Kamikawa, Hyōgo Prefecture, Japan

Hase Station 長谷駅
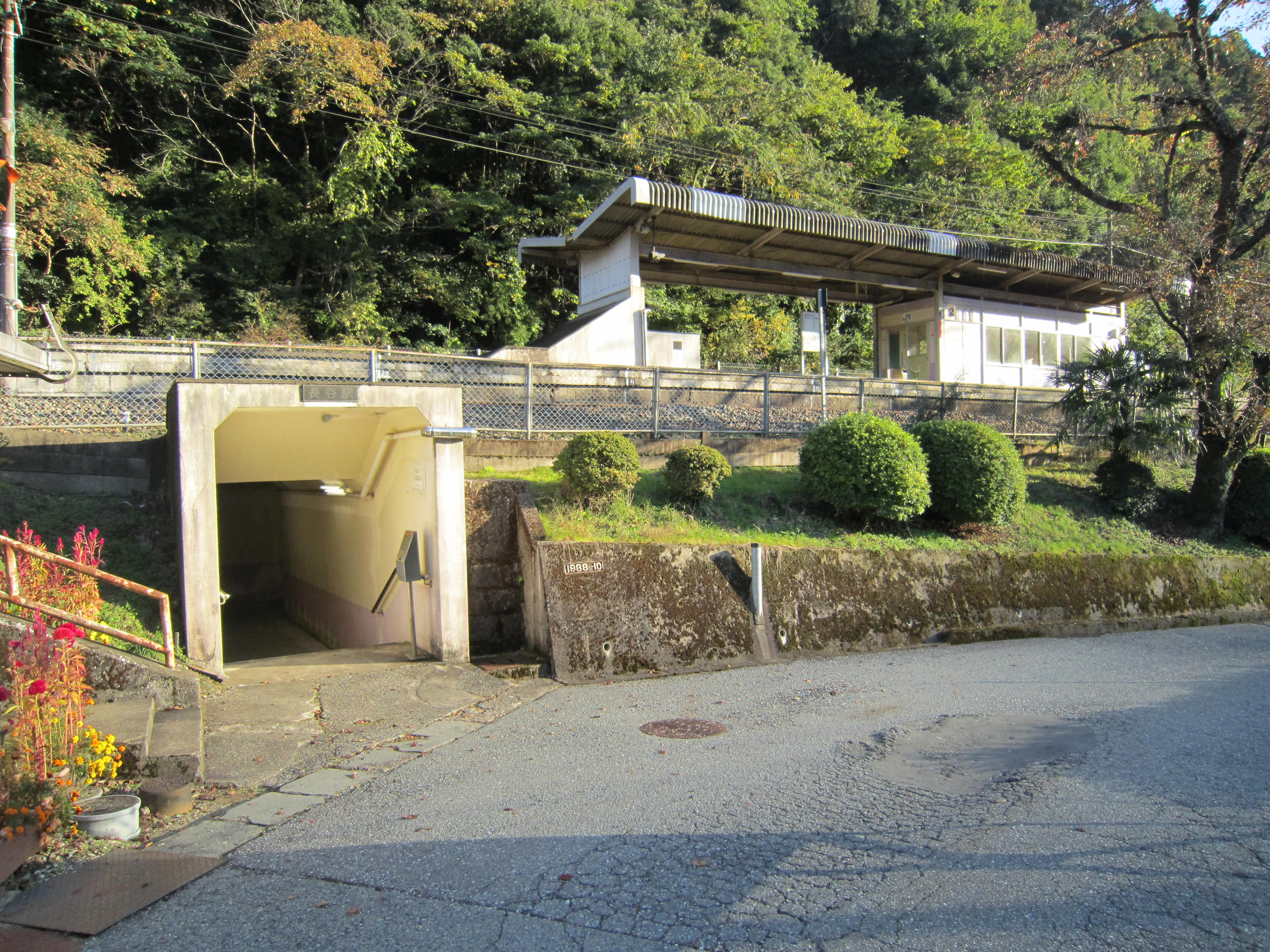
- Hase Station, October 2008

General information
- Location: -Kuri, Kamikawa-chō, Kanzaki-gun, Hyōgo-ken 679-3102; Japan
- Coordinates: 35°07′01″N 134°44′53″E
- Owner: West Japan Railway Company
- Operator: West Japan Railway Company
- Line: Bantan Line
- Distance: 35.9 km (22.3 miles) from Himeji
- Platforms: 1 island platform
- Connections: Bus stop

Other information
- Status: Unstaffed
- Website: Official website

History
- Opened: 15 January 1895

Passengers
- FY2016: 19 daily
Location
- Location within Hyōgo Prefecture Location within Japan

Hase Station (長谷駅, Hase-eki) is a passenger railway station located in the town of Kamikawa, Kanzaki District, Hyōgo Prefecture, Japan, operated by West Japan Railway Company (JR West).

== Lines ==
Hase Station is served by the Bantan Line, and is located 35.9 kilometers from the terminus of the line at Himeji.

== Station layout ==
The station consists of oneisland platform on an embankment, which is accessed by an underground passage. There is no station building and the station is unattended.

=== Platforms ===
1	■ Bantan Line	for Fukusaki and Himeji
2	■ Bantan Line	for Wadayama

== Adjacent stations ==
«	Service	»
West Japan Railway Company
Bantan Line
Limited Express Hamakaze: Does not stop at this station
Teramae	Local	Ikuno

== History ==
Hase Station opened on January 15, 1895, as a temporary terminus of the Bantan Railway from Himeji. The railway was stretched to the north in April 1895. With the privatization of the Japan National Railways (JNR) on April 1, 1987, the station came under the aegis of the West Japan Railway Company.

== Passenger statistics ==
In fiscal 2016, the station was used by an average of 19 passengers daily.

== Surrounding area ==
- Kamikawa Town Hase Branch
- Okochi Power Station

== See also ==
- List of railway stations in Japan
