= Takeda Station =

Takeda Station is the name of multiple train stations in Japan.

- Takeda Station (Hyōgo) - in Hyōgo Prefecture
- Takeda Station (Kyoto) - in Kyoto Prefecture
