= Asago =

Asago 朝来市
- City
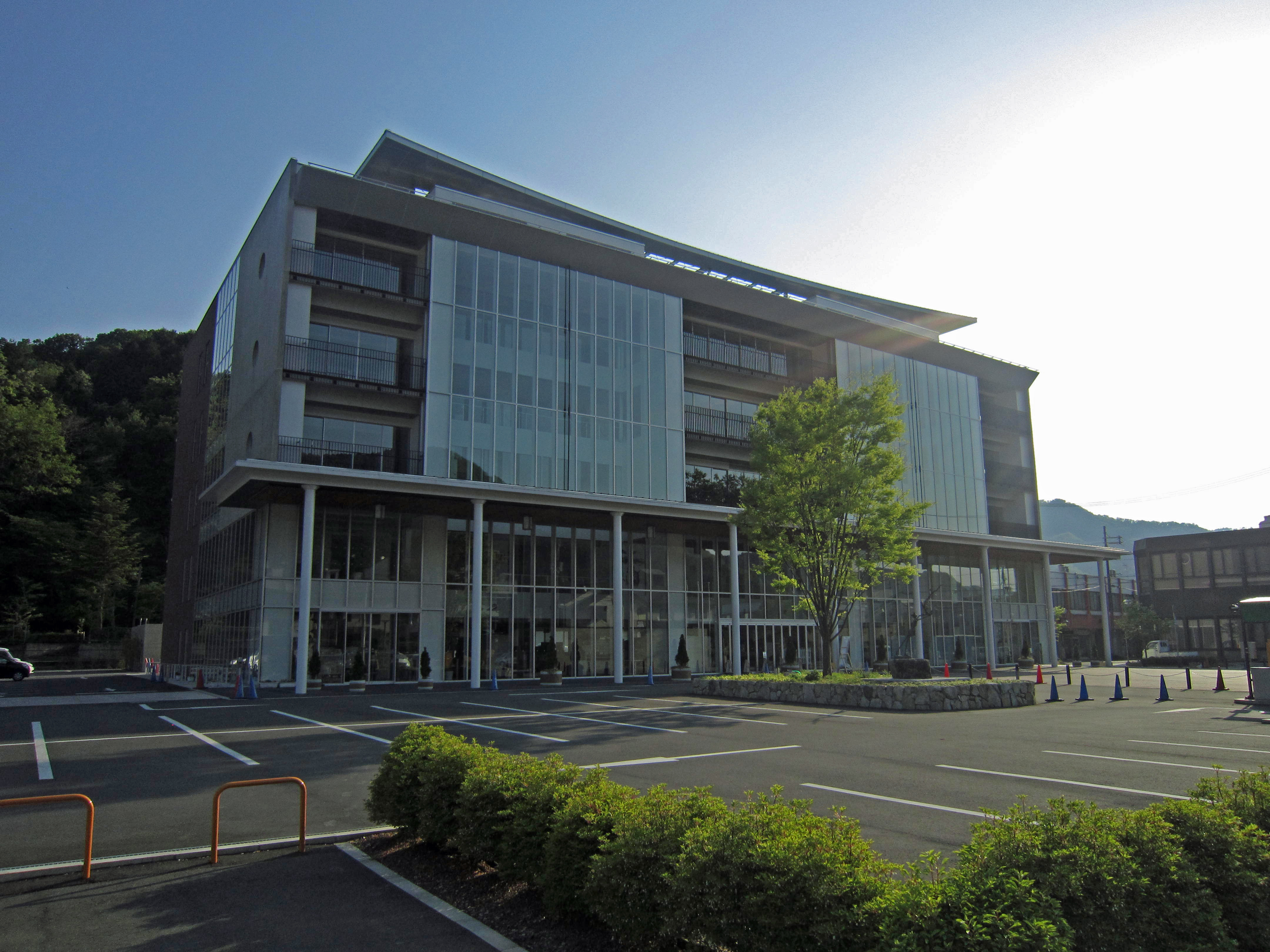
- Asago City Hall

- Flag Emblem

- Location of Asago in Hyōgo Prefecture

- Location in Japan
- Coordinates: 35°20′N 134°51′E
- Country: Japan
- Region: Kansai
- Prefecture: Hyōgo

Government
  - Mayor: Isamu Fujioka (since May 2021)

Area
  - Total: 403.06 km^{2} (155.62 sq mi)

Population (March 31, 2022)
  - Total: 28,971
  - Density: 71.878/km^{2} (186.16/sq mi)
- Time zone: UTC+09:00 (JST)
- City hall address: 213-1 Higashitani, Wadayama-cho, Asago-shi, Hyogo-ken 669-5292
- Climate: Cfa
- Website: Official website
- Symbols
- Flower: Cherry blossom
- Tree: Zelkova serrata

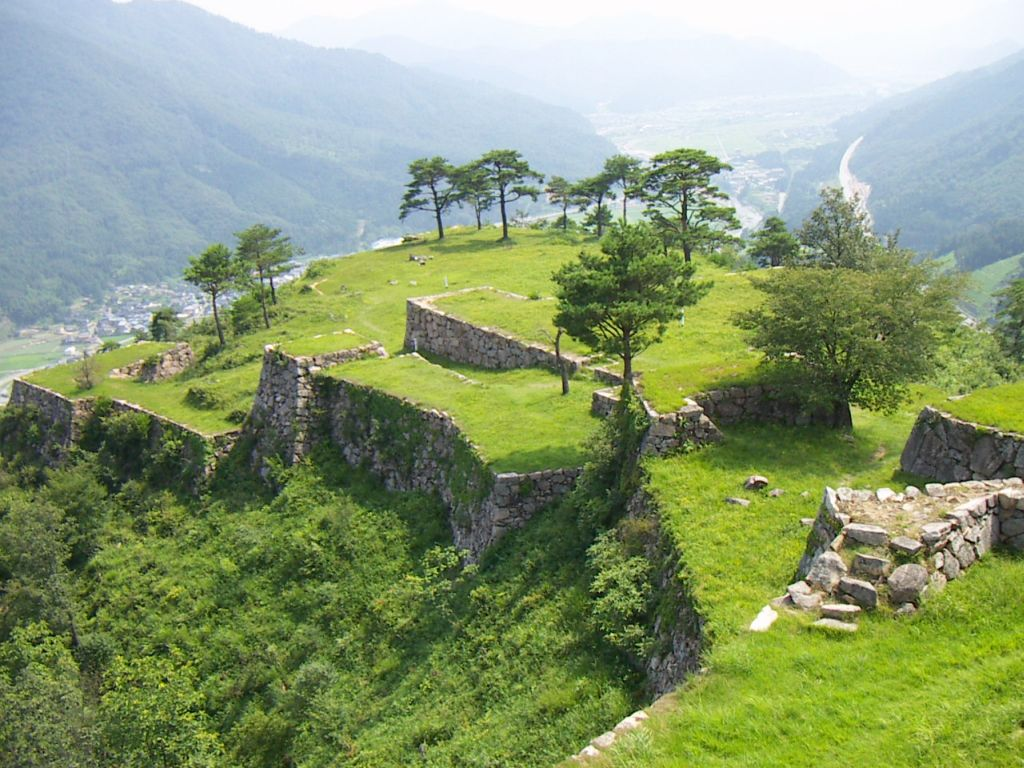
Ruins of Takeda Castle

Asago (朝来市, Asago-shi; Japanese pronunciation: [ä̀.sä́.ɡó̞(.ɕì), -ŋó̞(.ɕì)]) is a city located in northern Hyōgo Prefecture, Japan. As of 31 March 2022, the city had an estimated population of 28,971 in 12245 households and a population density of 72 persons per km^{2}. The total area of the city is 403.06 square kilometres (155.62 sq mi).

== Geography ==
Asago is located in the north of Hyōgo Prefecture. It is located in the east of Chūgoku Mountains, and the mountains and forests occupy 93% of the town. The Maruyama flows from south to north in the town. The Tataragi Dam was built across the Tataragi stream, a tributary of the Maruyama.

=== Neighbouring municipalities ===
Hyōgo Prefecture

- Kamikawa
- Shisō
- Taka
- Tanba
- Toyooka
- Yabu

Kyoto Prefecture

- Fukuchiyama

=== Climate ===
Asago has a humid subtropical climate (Köppen climate classification Cfa) with hot summers and cool to cold winters. Precipitation is significantly higher in summer than in winter, though on the whole lower than most parts of Honshū, and there is no significant snowfall. The average annual temperature in Asago is 13.4 °C (56.1 °F). The average annual rainfall is 2,091.8 mm (82.35 in) with July as the wettest month. The temperatures are highest on average in August, at around 25.7 °C (78.3 °F), and lowest in January, at around 1.9 °C (35.4 °F). The highest temperature ever recorded in Asago was 38.0 °C (100.4 °F) on 20 August 2020; the coldest temperature ever recorded was −12.8 °C (9.0 °F) on 28 February 1981.

Climate data for Ikuno, Asago (1991−2020 normals, extremes 1978−present)
Month	Jan	Feb	Mar	Apr	May	Jun	Jul	Aug	Sep	Oct	Nov	Dec	Year
Record high °C (°F)	15.0 (59.0)	20.2 (68.4)	23.8 (74.8)	28.8 (83.8)	32.4 (90.3)	35.8 (96.4)	37.5 (99.5)	38.0 (100.4)	37.0 (98.6)	31.8 (89.2)	25.2 (77.4)	20.0 (68.0)	38.0 (100.4)
Mean daily maximum °C (°F)	6.1 (43.0)	7.0 (44.6)	11.4 (52.5)	17.7 (63.9)	22.9 (73.2)	25.9 (78.6)	29.7 (85.5)	31.3 (88.3)	26.3 (79.3)	20.5 (68.9)	14.7 (58.5)	8.9 (48.0)	18.5 (65.4)
Daily mean °C (°F)	1.9 (35.4)	2.5 (36.5)	6.0 (42.8)	11.6 (52.9)	16.8 (62.2)	20.7 (69.3)	24.7 (76.5)	25.7 (78.3)	21.4 (70.5)	15.4 (59.7)	9.6 (49.3)	4.4 (39.9)	13.4 (56.1)
Mean daily minimum °C (°F)	−1.3 (29.7)	−1.1 (30.0)	1.3 (34.3)	6.0 (42.8)	11.2 (52.2)	16.4 (61.5)	21.2 (70.2)	21.9 (71.4)	17.7 (63.9)	11.3 (52.3)	5.5 (41.9)	0.9 (33.6)	9.3 (48.7)
Record low °C (°F)	−9.7 (14.5)	−9.9 (14.2)	−7.3 (18.9)	−2.5 (27.5)	0.8 (33.4)	6.2 (43.2)	13.3 (55.9)	14.2 (57.6)	7.8 (46.0)	1.3 (34.3)	−1.8 (28.8)	−7.1 (19.2)	−9.9 (14.2)
Average precipitation mm (inches)	97.0 (3.82)	107.4 (4.23)	161.3 (6.35)	172.0 (6.77)	205.5 (8.09)	228.7 (9.00)	285.7 (11.25)	196.3 (7.73)	263.8 (10.39)	173.8 (6.84)	101.3 (3.99)	99.1 (3.90)	2,091.8 (82.35)
Average precipitation days (≥ 1.0 mm)	13.2	13.6	13.7	11.4	11.4	12.8	14.8	11.2	12.6	9.8	10.4	12.3	147.2
Mean monthly sunshine hours	85.3	89.0	136.9	177.6	186.3	126.5	132.1	173.3	127.4	144.1	115.6	97.8	1,592
Source: Japan Meteorological Agency

Climate data for Wadayama, Asago (1991−2020 normals, extremes 1977−present)
Month	Jan	Feb	Mar	Apr	May	Jun	Jul	Aug	Sep	Oct	Nov	Dec	Year
Record high °C (°F)	18.1 (64.6)	22.1 (71.8)	24.7 (76.5)	32.2 (90.0)	34.1 (93.4)	37.3 (99.1)	37.8 (100.0)	38.3 (100.9)	36.9 (98.4)	31.4 (88.5)	25.5 (77.9)	21.7 (71.1)	38.3 (100.9)
Mean daily maximum °C (°F)	7.1 (44.8)	8.1 (46.6)	12.6 (54.7)	19.0 (66.2)	24.1 (75.4)	26.9 (80.4)	30.6 (87.1)	31.9 (89.4)	27.3 (81.1)	21.7 (71.1)	15.9 (60.6)	10.1 (50.2)	19.6 (67.3)
Daily mean °C (°F)	2.6 (36.7)	3.1 (37.6)	6.6 (43.9)	12.2 (54.0)	17.6 (63.7)	21.5 (70.7)	25.4 (77.7)	26.2 (79.2)	21.9 (71.4)	15.9 (60.6)	10.2 (50.4)	5.1 (41.2)	14.0 (57.3)
Mean daily minimum °C (°F)	−0.9 (30.4)	−0.9 (30.4)	1.4 (34.5)	5.8 (42.4)	11.7 (53.1)	17.1 (62.8)	21.7 (71.1)	22.2 (72.0)	18.0 (64.4)	11.6 (52.9)	5.8 (42.4)	1.2 (34.2)	9.6 (49.2)
Record low °C (°F)	−11.2 (11.8)	−12.8 (9.0)	−9.6 (14.7)	−2.9 (26.8)	0.1 (32.2)	6.6 (43.9)	13.8 (56.8)	14.9 (58.8)	7.0 (44.6)	1.2 (34.2)	−2.3 (27.9)	−7.8 (18.0)	−12.8 (9.0)
Average precipitation mm (inches)	122.5 (4.82)	109.7 (4.32)	120.8 (4.76)	101.0 (3.98)	121.9 (4.80)	151.6 (5.97)	187.7 (7.39)	145.7 (5.74)	224.5 (8.84)	147.2 (5.80)	85.4 (3.36)	110.2 (4.34)	1,628 (64.09)
Average snowfall cm (inches)	64 (25)	66 (26)	11 (4.3)	0 (0)	0 (0)	0 (0)	0 (0)	0 (0)	0 (0)	0 (0)	0 (0)	26 (10)	170 (67)
Average precipitation days (≥ 1.0 mm)	16.7	15.4	14.7	10.8	9.9	11.5	12.6	9.7	12.2	10.6	11.2	14.9	150.2
Average snowy days (≥ 3 cm)	6.5	5.6	1.3	0	0	0	0	0	0	0	0	2.3	15.7
Mean monthly sunshine hours	86.2	87.4	129.1	168.9	182.9	132.7	141.6	186.2	123.4	123.6	106.7	93.9	1,559.8
Source: Japan Meteorological Agency

== Demographics ==
Per Japanese census data, the population of Asago in 2020 is 28,989 people. Asago has been conducting censuses since 1960.

Historical population
Year	Pop.	±%
1960	47,118	—
1965	43,637	−7.4%
1970	39,506	−9.5%
1975	37,763	−4.4%
1980	36,850	−2.4%
1985	37,149	+0.8%
1990	36,625	−1.4%
1995	36,766	+0.4%
2000	36,069	−1.9%
2005	34,791	−3.5%
2010	32,819	−5.7%
2015	30,805	−6.1%
2020	28,989	−5.9%
Asago population statistics

== History ==
The area of Asago was in ancient Tajima Province and is the location of many burial mounds from the Kofun period. These include the Chasuriyama Kofun in Wadayama, one of the largest enpun (円墳)-style elliptical burial mounds in the Kansai region. The Ikuno Silver Mine opened in 807 in the early Heian period and mining continue through the Edo Period. During the Sengoku period the area was under the control of the Yamana clan, the shugo of Tajima Province and Takeda Castle was the stronghold their retainers, the Otagaki clan. Following the establishment of the Tokugawa shogunate, the area was mostly tenryō territory under direct control of the shogunate due to the importance of the silver mine, with some small areas undertone control of Toyooka Domain or Izushi Domain. Following the Meiji restoration, the area was under"Toyooka Prefecture" until incorporated into Hyōgo Prefecture in 1876. The town of Ikuno and the villages of Yamaguchi and Akagawa were created with the establishment of the modern municipalities on April 1, 1889. Asago was founded on March 31, 1954, from the merger of the former villages of Yamaguchi and Nakagawa. By 2004, the town had an estimated population of 7,465 and a density of 57.33 persons per km^{2}. The total area was 130.20 km^{2}. On April 1, 2005, Asago absorbed the towns of Ikuno, Santō and Wadayama (all from Asago District) to create the city of Asago.

== Government ==
Asago has a mayor-council form of government with a directly elected mayor and a unicameral city council of 18 members. Asago contributes one member to the Hyogo Prefectural Assembly. In terms of national politics, the city is part of Hyōgo 5th district of the lower house of the Diet of Japan.

== Economy ==
Asago has mostly a rural economy based on agriculture and commerce. Local industries include food processing, metal products, electrical machinery, and non-ferrous metals.

== Education ==
Asago has seven public elementary schools and four public middle schools operated by the city government and two public high schools operated by the Hyōgo Prefectural Department of Education. There is also one private middle school and one private high school. The prefecture also operates one special education school for the handicapped.

== Transportation ==
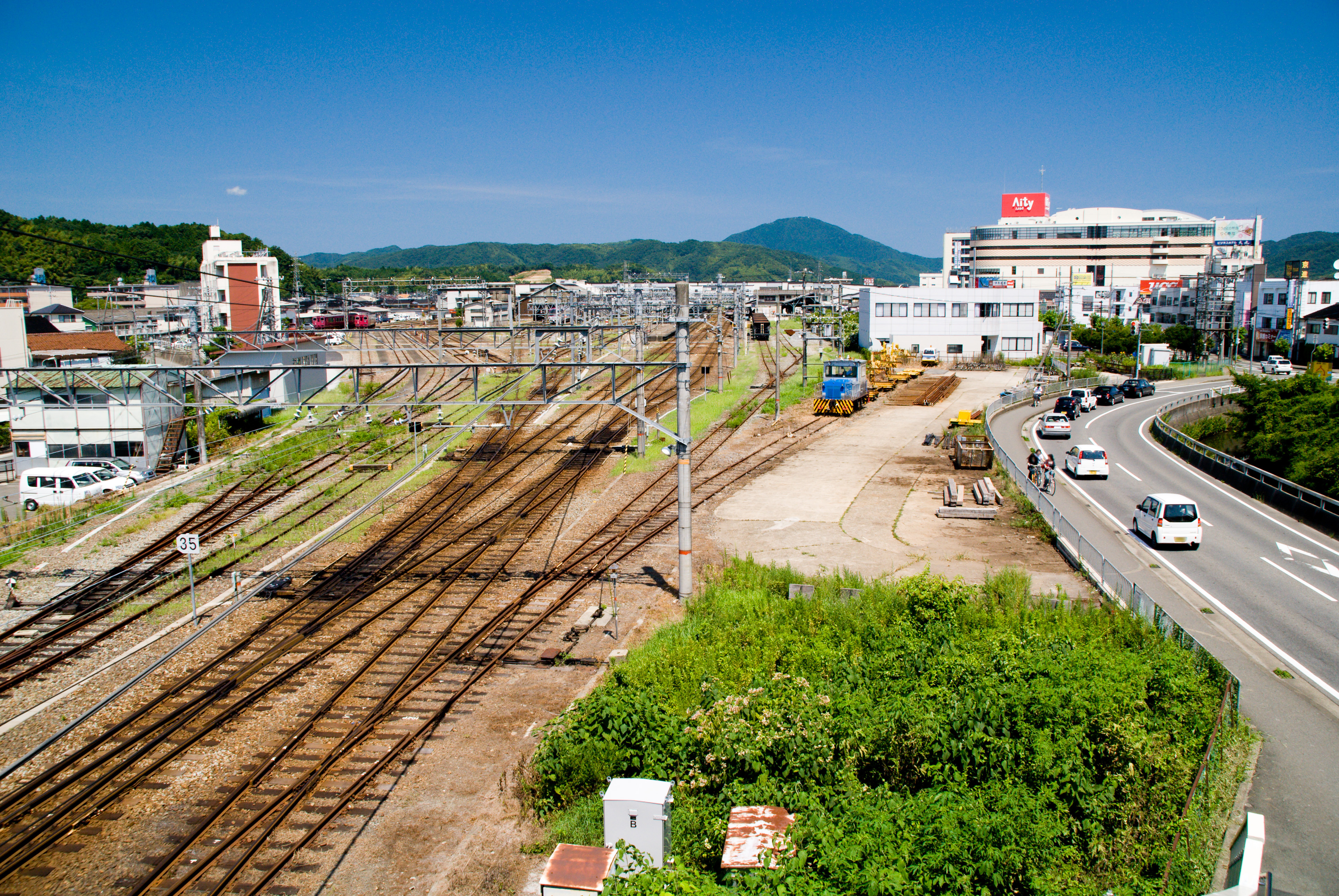
Fukuchiyama branch office of JR West on Toyooka.

=== Railway ===
JR West – San'in Main Line

- Yanase - Wadayama

JR West – Bantan Line

- Ikuno - Nii - Aokura - Takeda - Wadayama

=== Highways ===
- Kitakinki-Toyooka Expressway
- Bantan Renraku Road
- National Route 9
- National Route 312
- National Route 427
- National Route 429

== International relations ==
=== Sister cities ===
- Newberg, Oregon, United States
- Perth, Ontario, Canada

=== Friendship cities ===
- Barbizon, France

== Local attractions ==
- Asago Art Village
- Ikuno Dam
- Ikuno Ginzan Silver Mine
- Kuchiganaya area
  - Tanyo Museum
  - Ikuno Shoin
- Kurokawa Dam
- Takeda Castle
- Tataragi Dam
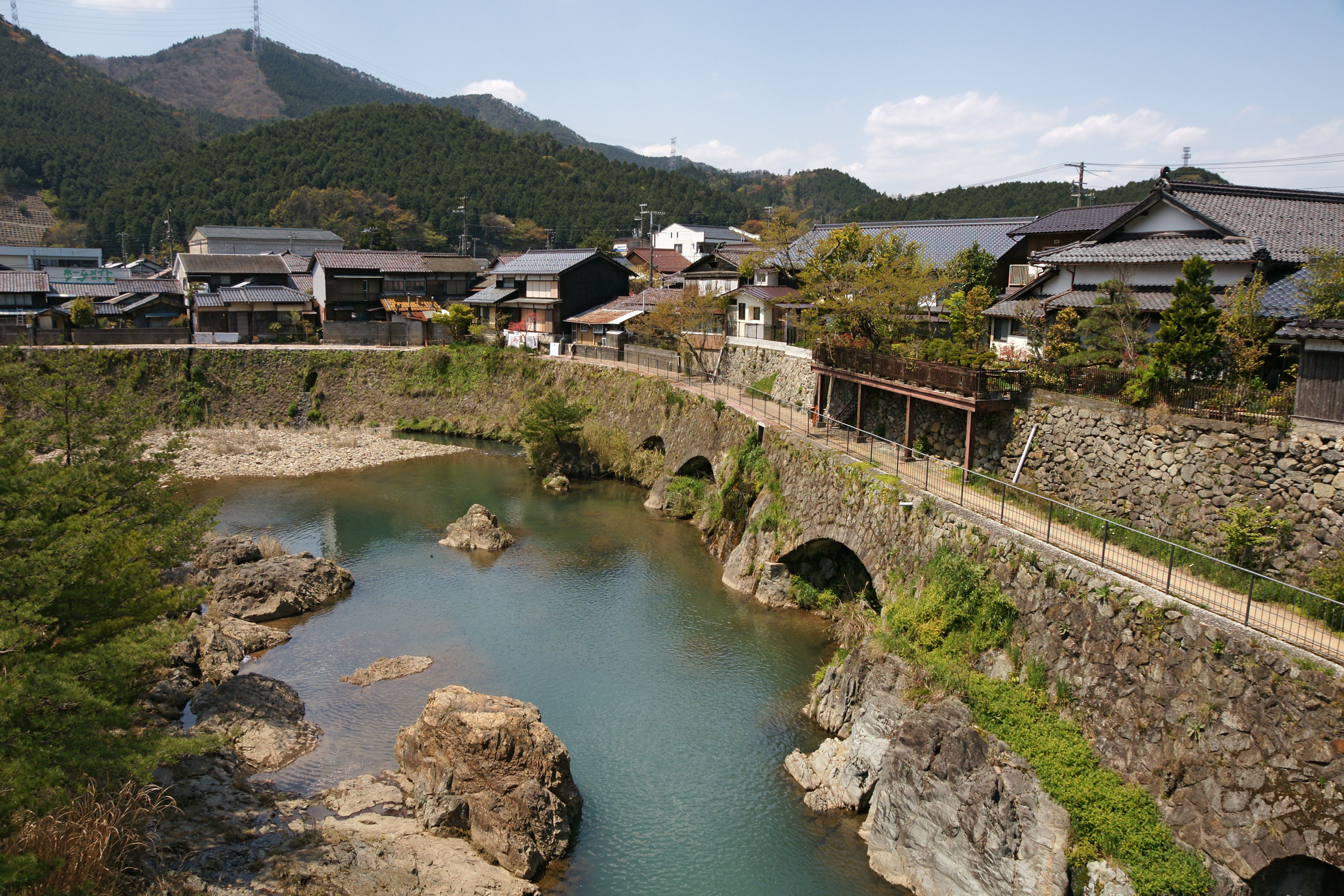
Scenery of Kuchiganaya, Ikuno

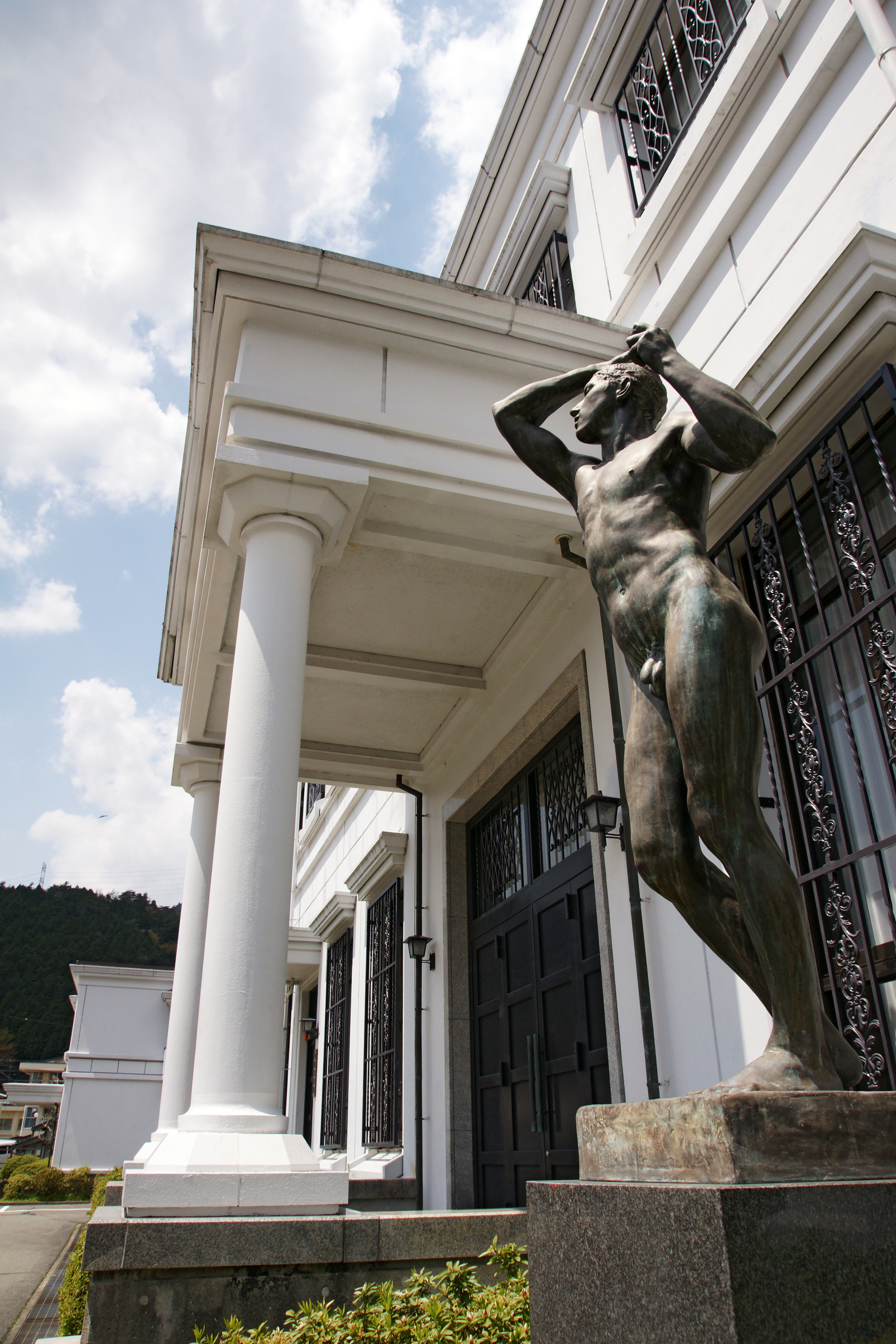
Tanyo Museum

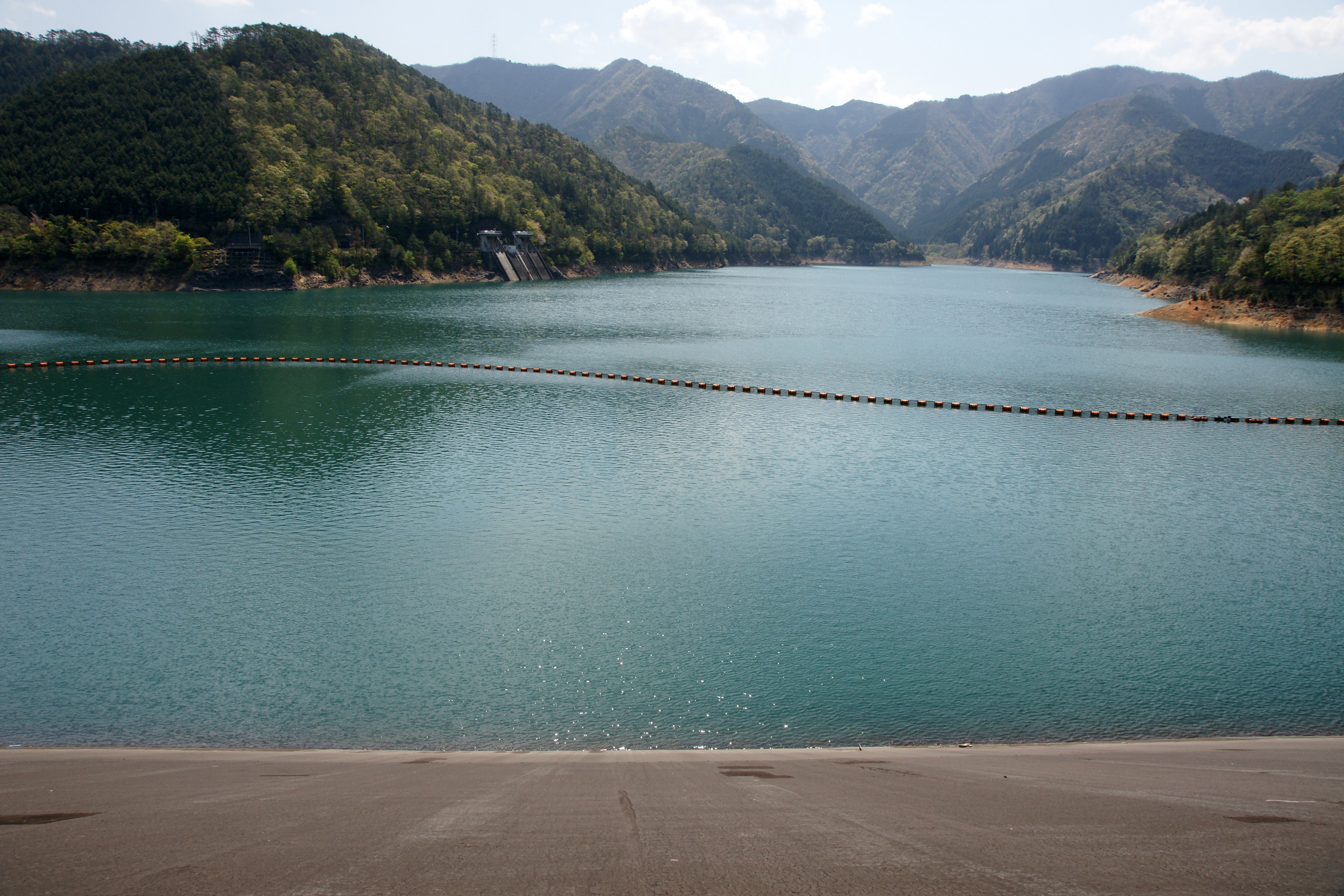
Tataragi Dam

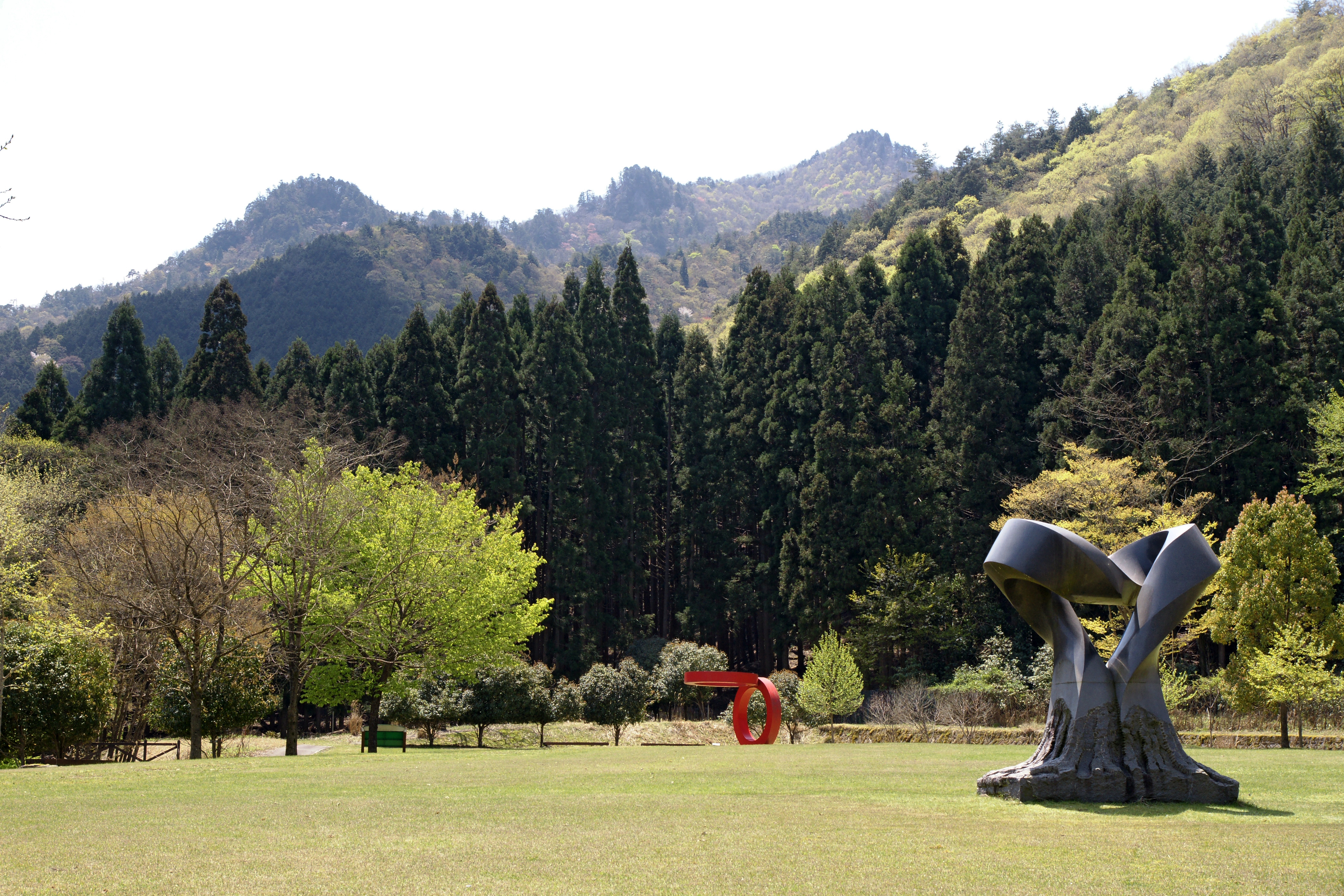
Asago Art Village

== Noted people from Asago ==
- Takashi Shimura, actor
- Sanzo Wada, artist, costume designer
