= Nii Station =

Nii Station is the name of two train stations in Japan:

- Nii Station (Hyōgo) (新井駅)
- Nii Station (Mie) (新居駅)
