= Chasuriyama Kofun =

Burial mound in Hyōgo, Japan

- 茶すり山古墳 (Japanese)
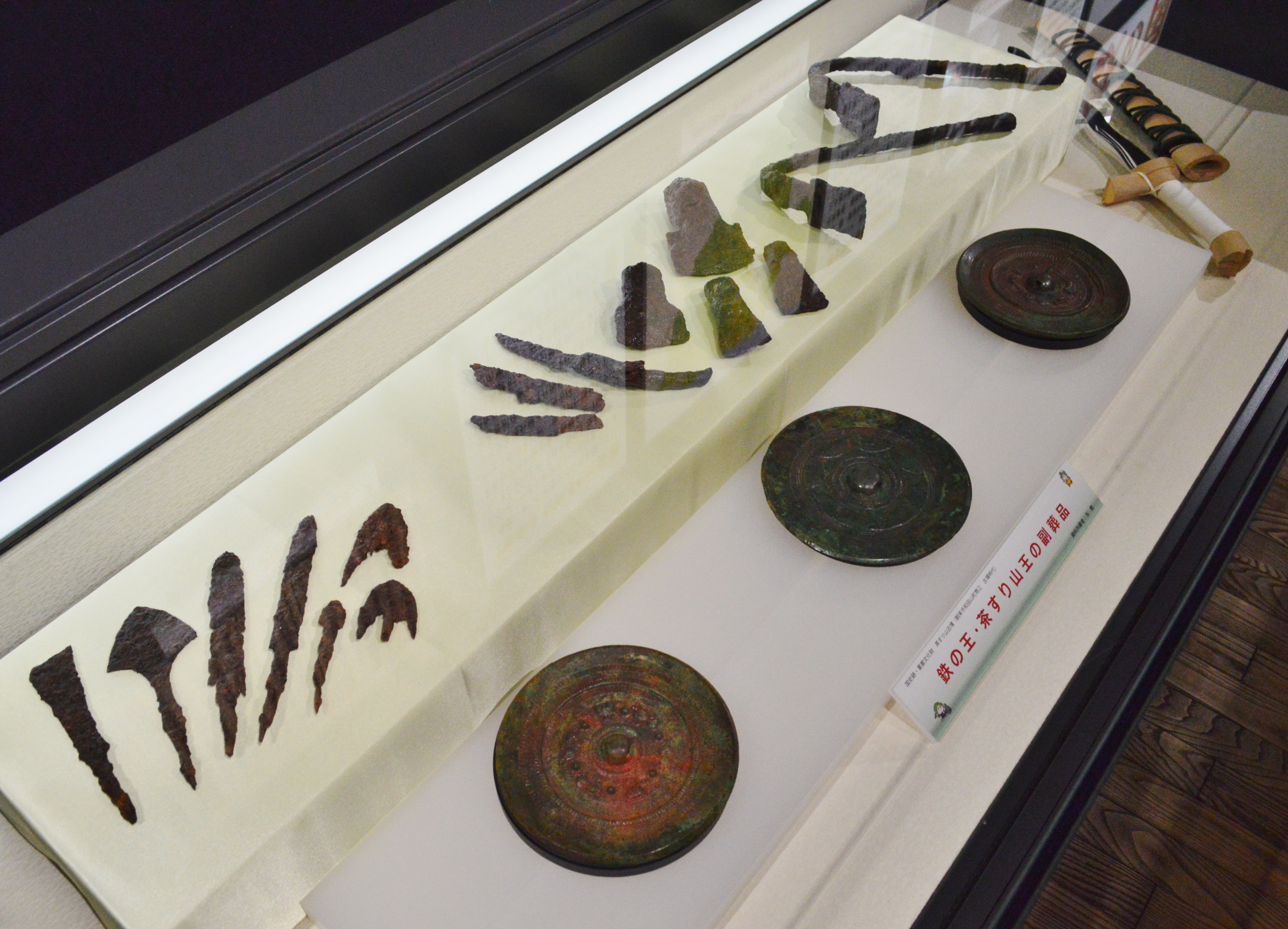
- Artifacts recovered from the Chasuriyama Kofun (ICP)

- Chasuriyama Kofun Chasuriyama Kofun (Japan)
- 35°18′34.4″N 134°51′40.3″E
- Type: Kofun cluster
- Periods: Kofun period
- Location: Asago, Hyōgo, Japan
- Region: Kansai region

History
- Built: c.5th century

Site notes
- Public access: Yes (park and museum)
- National Historic Site of Japan

The Chasuriyama Kofun (茶すり山古墳) is a Kofun period burial mound, located in the Ikunocho Kuchiganaya neighborhood of the city of Asago, Hyōgo, in the Kansai region of Japan. It was designated a National Historic Site of Japan in 2004.

== Overview ==
The Chasuriyama Kofun is located at the tip of a narrow ridge overlooking the Wadayama basin in the southern part of the Tajima region. This area is a transportation hub that connects Harima and Tajima, and is on the estimated route of the ancient San-in highway from the Kinai region to the Sea of Japan and the San'in region of Japan. It is a large empun (円墳)-style elliptical burial mound with a major axis of 90 meters, minor axis of 78 meters and a height of 18 meters. The mound was considerably damaged by the construction of a fortification in the 16th century. Part of the fukiishi remain in the northeastern quadrant mound, and fragments of both cylindrical and morning glory-shaped haniwa have been found. However, some of the haniwa shards remained in situ and could be completely restored. The construction period of the tumulus is estimated to be from the first half of the 5th century from the style of haniwa used.

The tumulus was excavated in 2001in conjunction with construction of the Kitakinki-Toyooka Expressway, during which time two burial chambers, each containing multiple burials, and a very large quantity of grave goods were discovered. Due to the very large quantity of weapons, it is assumed that the persons buried in this tumulus were warrior chieftains.

The first chamber was 13.6 by 10.1 meters and contained a long clay-covered wooden casket orientated to the each. Inside, the casket was painted red and was divided in several sections by partitions. The main (central) partition contained the burial, with side-rooms to the east and west, which were further sub-divided. Figurative haniwa, one of which depicted a house, were also found within the casket. Grave goods included three bronze mirrors, (one of which appears to be Late Han dynasty), two sets of armor, and 10 iron swords, hatchets and other bladed weapons and 370 iron arrowheads, remnants of leather shields with rhombus or sawtooth decorations, magatama and glass beads. The second burial chamber was smaller, at 7.5 by 3.7 meters, and the wooden casket had no clay covering. As with the first burial chamber, the casket was divided into compartments; however, the number of grave goods was smaller and different in nature. One bronze mirror was placed on the chest of the deceased, who also a necklace with magatama and other beads, and two iron swords were found, one on either side of the body. The eastern sub-chamber had more than 50 iron agricultural implements, but these were too small to have been of practical use and appear to have been made as ritual objects. The western sub-chamber had on 14 iron arrowheads. The artifacts were collectively designated a National Important Cultural Property in 2013.

Currently, the site is preserved as is the Chasuriyama Kofun Park, with some of the artifacts on display at the Chasuriyama Kofun Learning Center (茶すり山古墳学習館, Chasuriyama kofun gakushū-kan) on site. It is located about 18 minutes by car from Yanase Station on the JR West San'in Main Line.

== See also ==
- List of Historic Sites of Japan (Hyōgo)
