= Aokura Station =

Railway station in Asago, Hyōgo Prefecture, Japan

Aokura Station 青倉駅
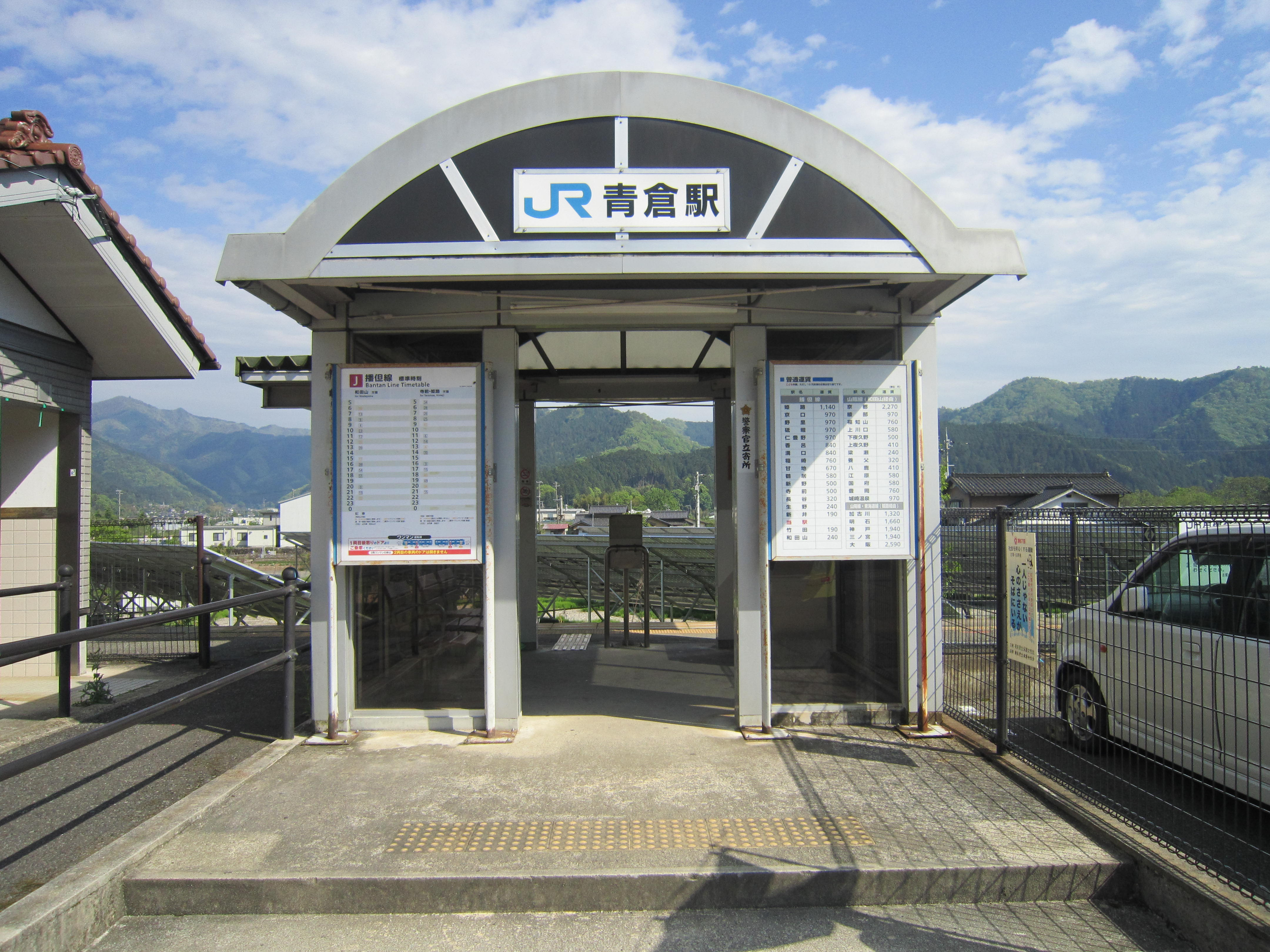
- Aokura Station, April 2018

General information
- Location: 1521-2 Maeda, Mononobe, Asago-shi, Hyōgo-ken 679-3401; Japan
- Coordinates: 35°16′02″N 134°48′42″E
- Owner: West Japan Railway Company
- Operator: West Japan Railway Company
- Line: Bantan Line
- Distance: 55.6 km (34.5 miles) from Himeji
- Platforms: 1 side platform
- Connections: Bus stop

Other information
- Status: Unstaffed
- Website: Official website

History
- Opened: 10 August 1934

Passengers
- FY2016: 52 daily
Location
- Location within Hyōgo Prefecture Location within Japan

Aokura Station (青倉駅, Aokura-eki) is a passenger railway station located in the city of Asago, Hyōgo Prefecture, Japan, operated by West Japan Railway Company (JR West). The name Aokura come from Aokura shrine that is about 5 kilometers east of the station and is known as the "God of Eyes" in Japan.

== Lines ==
Aokura Station is served by the Bantan Line, and is located 55.6 kilometers from the terminus of the line at Himeji.

== Station layout ==
The station consists of one ground-level side platform serving a single bi-directional track. The station is unattended.

== Adjacent stations ==
«	Service	»
West Japan Railway Company (JR West) Bantan Line
Limited Express Hamakaze: Does not stop at this station
Nii	Local	Takeda

== History ==
Aokura Station opened on August 10, 1934. With the privatization of the Japan National Railways (JNR) on April 1, 1987, the station came under the aegis of the West Japan Railway Company.

== Passenger statistics ==
In fiscal 2016, the station was used by an average of 52 passengers daily

== Surrounding area ==
- Aokura Shrine

== See also ==
- List of railway stations in Japan
