= Ikuno Station (Hyōgo) =

Railway station in Asago, Hyōgo Prefecture, Japan

Ikuno Station 生野駅
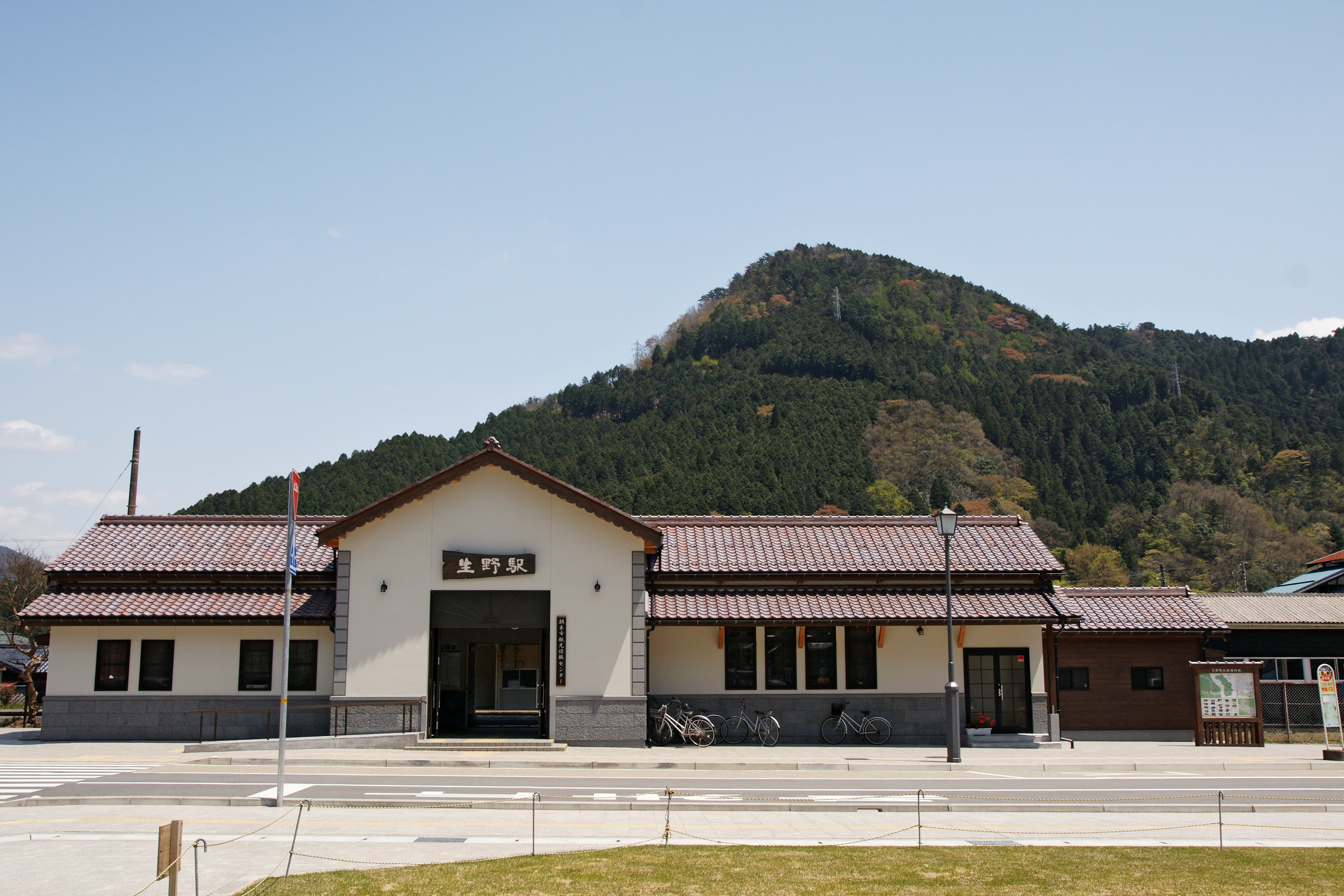
- Ikuno Station in May 2010

General information
- Location: Ikunocho Kuchiganaya, Asago-shi, Hyōgo-ken 679-3301; Japan
- Coordinates: 35°09′48″N 134°47′21″E
- Owner: West Japan Railway Company
- Operator: West Japan Railway Company
- Line: Bantan Line
- Distance: 43.6 km (27.1 miles) from Himeji
- Platforms: 2 side platforms
- Connections: Bus stop

Other information
- Status: Staffed
- Website: Official website

History
- Opened: 17 April 1895

Passengers
- FY2016: 273 daily
Location
- Location within Hyōgo Prefecture Location within Japan

Ikuno Station (生野駅, Ikuno-eki) is a passenger railway station located in the city of Asago, Hyōgo Prefecture, Japan, operated by West Japan Railway Company (JR West).

== Lines ==
Ikuno Station is served by the Bantan Line and is located 43.6 kilometers from the terminus of the line at Himeji.

== Station layout ==
The station consists of two opposed ground-level side platforms connected to the station building by a footbridge. The station is staffed.

=== Platforms ===
1	■ Bantan Line	for Wadayama
2	■ Bantan Line	for Teramae and Himeji

== Adjacent stations ==
«	Service	»
West Japan Railway Company (JR West) Bantan Line
Teramae	Limited Express Hamakaze	Wadayama
Hase	Local	Nii

== History ==
Ikuno Station opened on April 17, 1895. With the privatization of the Japan National Railways (JNR) on April 1, 1987, the station came under the aegis of the West Japan Railway Company.

== Passenger statistics ==
In fiscal 2016, the station was used by an average of 273 passengers daily

== Surrounding area ==
- Ginzan Town Corridor
- Ikuno Silver Mine

== See also ==
- List of railway stations in Japan
