= Arai Station =

Arai Station may refer to one of the following railway stations in Japan:

- Arai Station (Hyōgo) (荒井駅)
- Arai Station (Miyagi) (荒井駅)
- Arai Station (Niigata) (新井駅)
