= Nii Station (Hyōgo) =

Railway station in Asago, Hyōgo Prefecture, Japan

Nii Station 新井駅
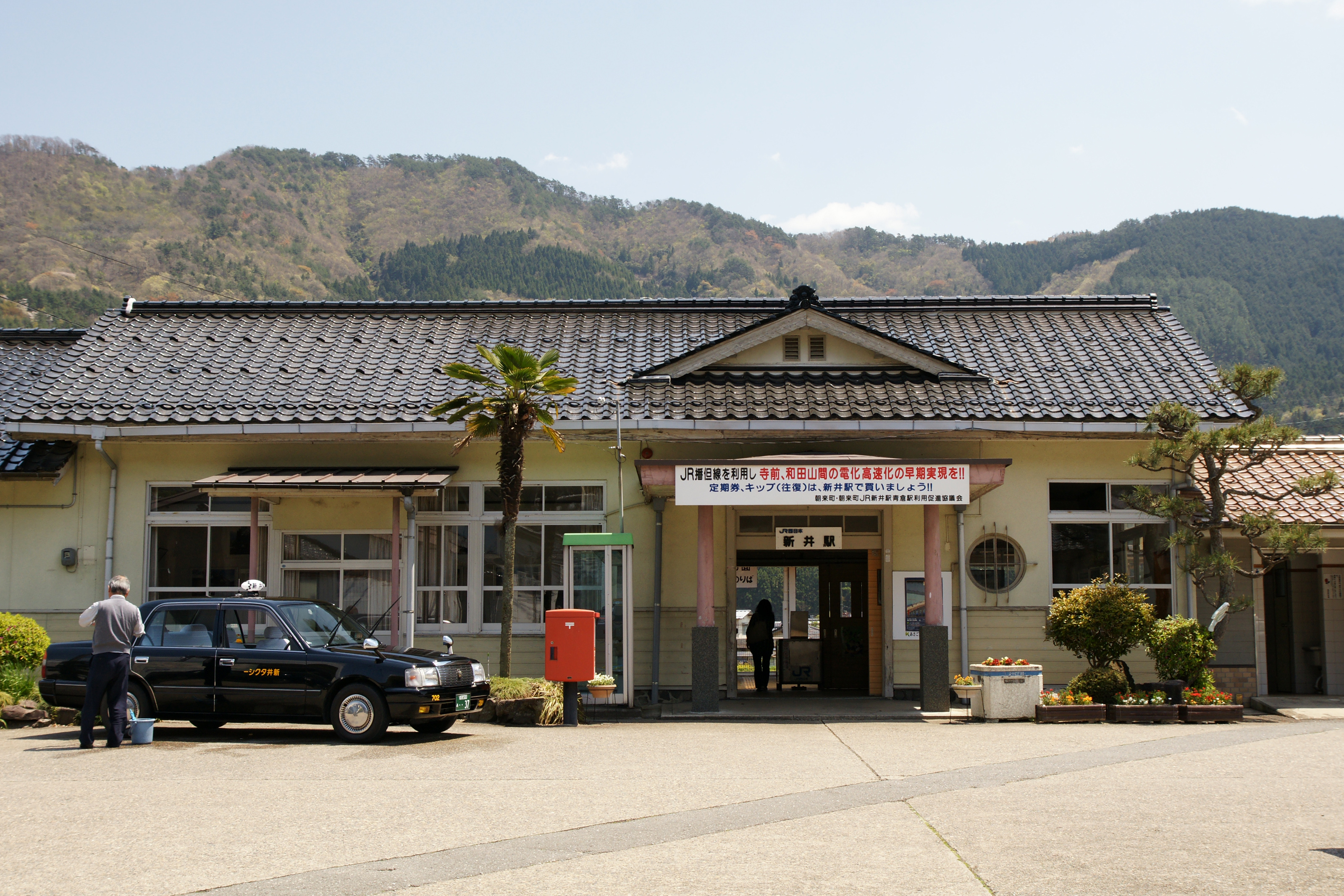
- Nii Station, May 2010

General information
- Location: 558-2 Kawanakahara, Nii, Asago-shi, Hyōgo-ken 679-3431; Japan
- Coordinates: 35°14′12″N 134°47′43″E
- Owner: West Japan Railway Company
- Operator: West Japan Railway Company
- Line: Bantan Line
- Distance: 51.9 km (32.2 miles) from Himeji
- Platforms: 2 side platforms
- Connections: Bus stop

Other information
- Status: Staffed
- Website: Official website

History
- Opened: 29 August 1901

Passengers
- FY2016: 132 daily
Location
- Location within Hyōgo Prefecture Location within Japan

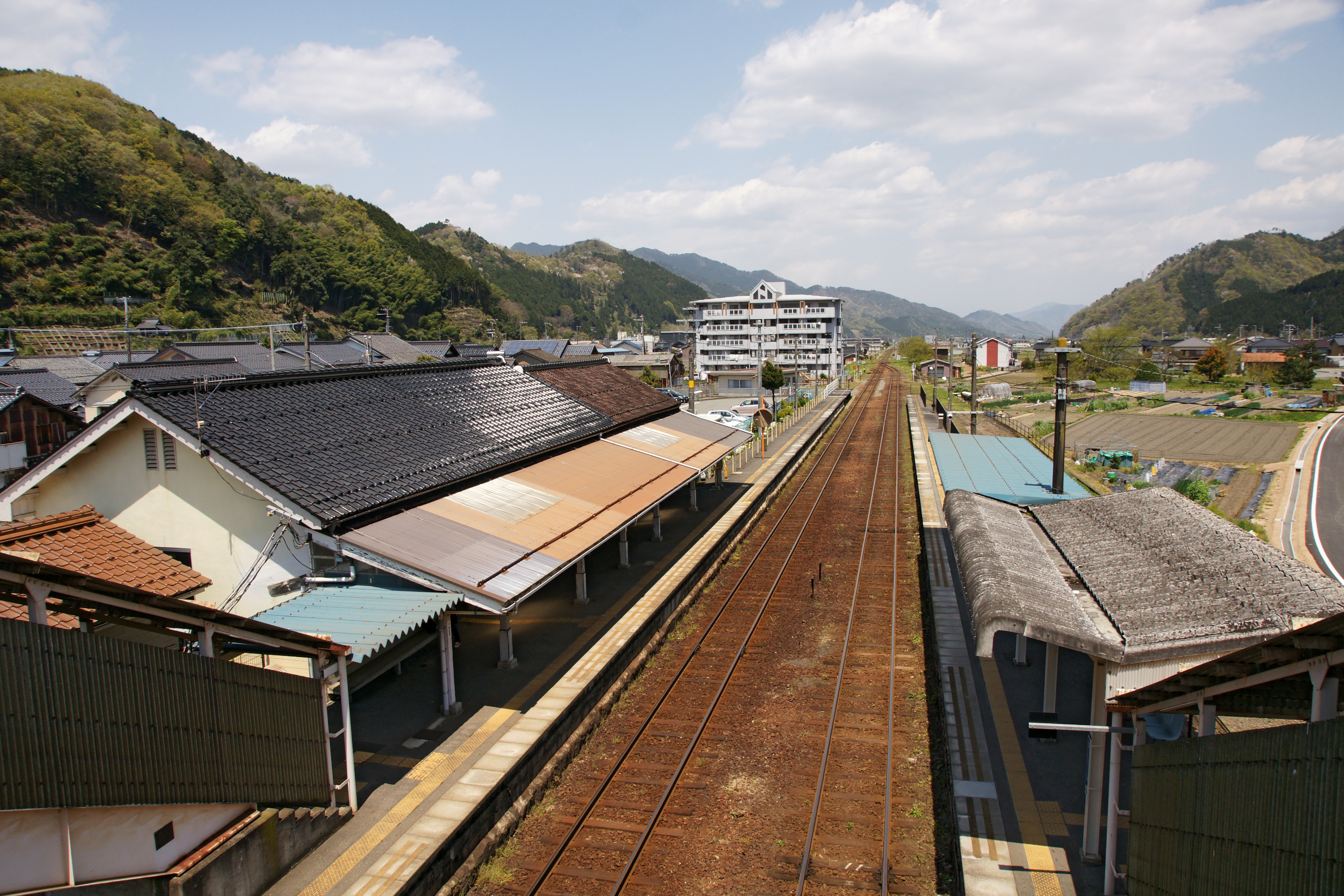
Nii Station platforms in May 2010

Nii Station (新井駅, Nii-eki) is a passenger railway station located in the city of Asago, Hyōgo Prefecture, Japan, operated by West Japan Railway Company (JR West).

== Lines ==
Nii Station is served by the Bantan Line, and is located 51.9 kilometers from the terminus of the line at Himeji.

== Station layout ==
The station consists of two opposed ground-level side platforms connected to the station building by a footbridge. The station is staffed.

=== Platforms ===
1	■ Bantan Line	for Teramae and Himeji
2	■ Bantan Line	for Wadayama

== Adjacent stations ==
«	Service	»
West Japan Railway Company (JR West) Bantan Line
Limited Express Hamakaze: Does not stop at this station
Ikuno	Local	Aokura

== History ==
Nii Station opened on August 29, 1901. With the privatization of the Japan National Railways (JNR) on April 1, 1987, the station came under the aegis of the West Japan Railway Company.

== Passenger statistics ==
In fiscal 2016, the station was used by an average of 132 passengers daily

== Surrounding area ==
- Asago City Hall Asago Branch
- Japan National Route 312

== See also ==
- List of railway stations in Japan
