= Ikuno Dam =

Dam in Hyōgo Prefecture, Japan

Coordinates: 35°11′04″N 134°49′18″E

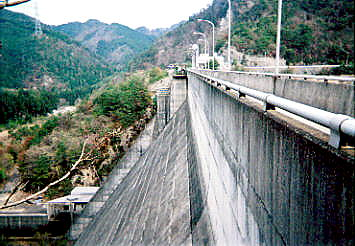
- Location: Asago, Hyōgo, Japan
- Construction began: 1970
- Opening date: 1984

Dam and spillways
- Impounds: Ichi River
- Height: 56.5 m
- Length: 220 m

Reservoir
- Total capacity: 18,000,000 m^{3}
- Catchment area: 490 km^{2}
- Surface area: 90 hectares

Ikuno Dam (生野ダム, Ikuno damu) is a dam in Asago, Hyōgo Prefecture, Japan.
