= Okutataragi Pumped Storage Power Station =

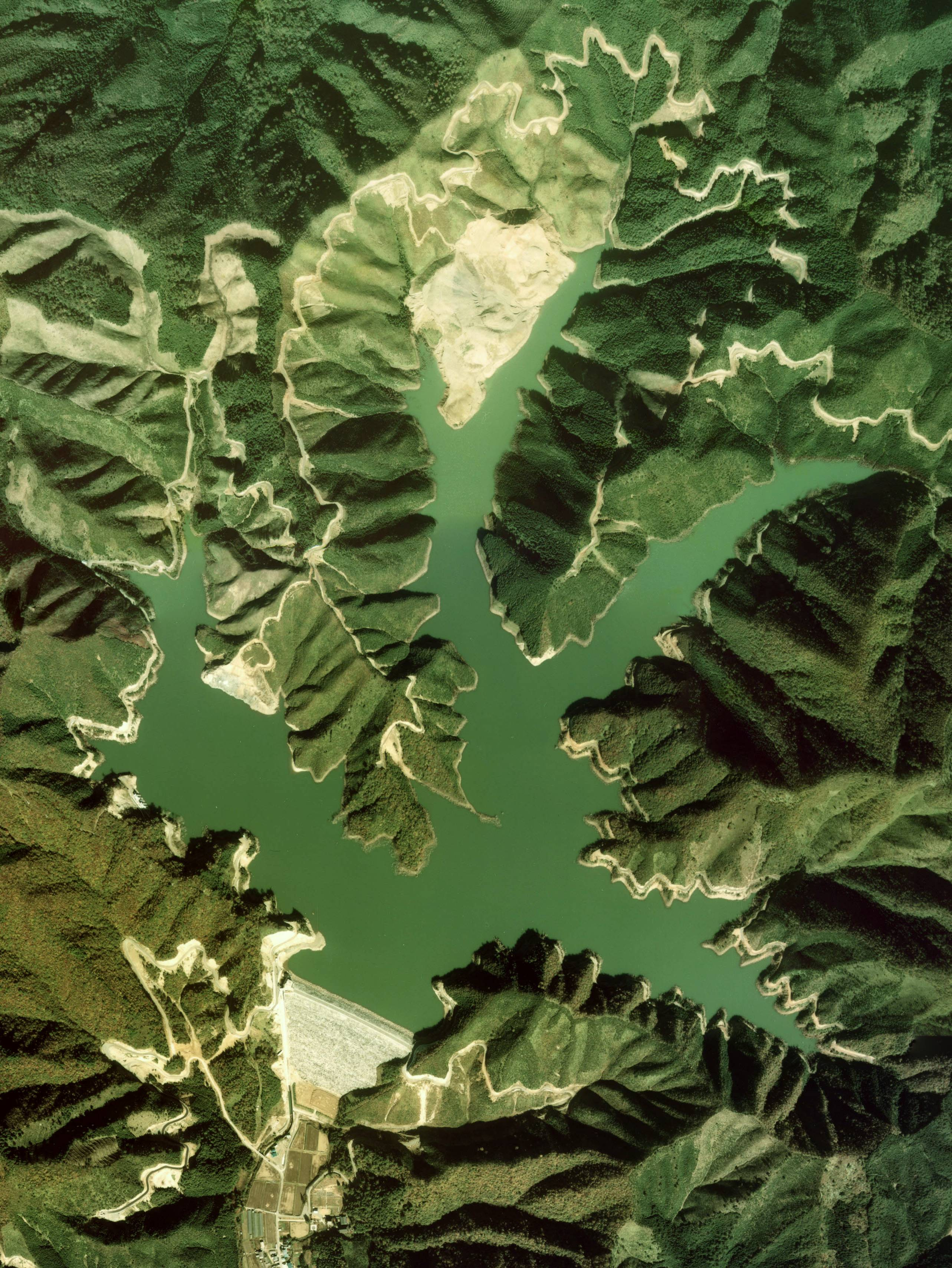
- Satellite view of the upper reservoir.
- Country: Japan
- Location: Asago, Hyōgo, Japan
- Coordinates: 35°14′12″N 134°51′23″E
- Status: Operational
- Construction began: 1970
- Opening date: 1974
- Operator(s): KEPCO

Upper reservoir
- Creates: Kurokawa Reservoir
- Total capacity: 33,387,000 m^{3} (27,067 acre⋅ft)

Lower reservoir
- Creates: Tataragi Reservoir
- Total capacity: 19,440,000 m^{3} (15,760 acre⋅ft)

Power Station
- Installed capacity: 1,932 MW (2,591,000 hp)

The Okutataragi Pumped Storage Power Station (奥多々良木発電所, Okutataragi hatsudensho) is a large pumped-storage hydroelectric power station in Asago, in the Hyōgo Prefecture of Japan. With a total installed capacity of 1,932 megawatts (2,591,000 hp), it is one of the largest pumped-storage power stations in the world, and the largest in Japan. The facility is currently run by the Kansai Electric Power Company.

Like most pumped-storage facilities, the power station utilizes two reservoirs, releasing and pumping as the demand rises and falls. Construction on the facility began in 1970 and was completed in 1974.

== Kurokawa Reservoir ==
The Kurokawa Reservoir, the upper reservoir, has a capacity of 33,387,000 cubic metres (27,067 acre⋅ft), a catchment area of 1,090,000 square metres (11,700,000 sq ft), and a reservoir surface area of 5.2 square kilometres (2.0 sq mi), and is held back by the Kurokawa Dam Japanese: 黒川ダム.

The embankment dam, located on the Ichi River, measures 98 metres (322 ft) tall, 325 metres (1,066 ft) wide, and is built with 3,650,000 cubic metres (129,000,000 cu ft) of material. The dam is located at 35°14′15″N 134°52′52″E.

== Tataragi Reservoir ==
The Tataragi Reservoir, the lower reservoir, has a capacity of 19,440,000 cubic metres (687,000,000 cu ft), a catchment area of 1,050,000 square metres (11,300,000 sq ft), and a reservoir surface area of 13.4 square kilometres (5.2 sq mi), and is held back by the Tataragi Dam Japanese: 多々良木ダム.

The dam measures 64.5 metres (212 ft) tall, 278 metres (912 ft) wide, and is built with 1,462,000 cubic metres (51,600,000 cu ft) of material. The dam is located at 35°14′13″N 134°49′55″E.

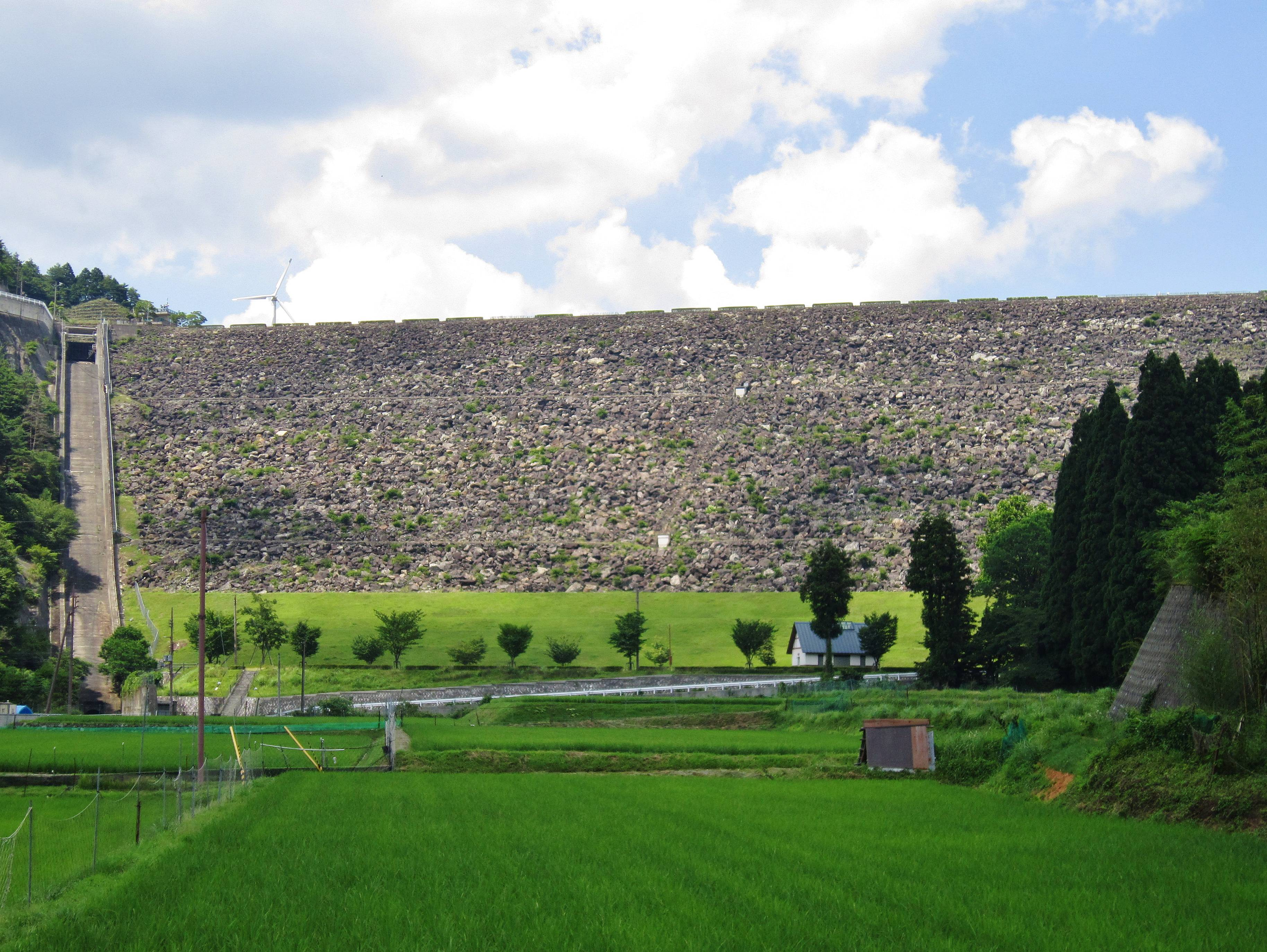
Kurokawa Dam

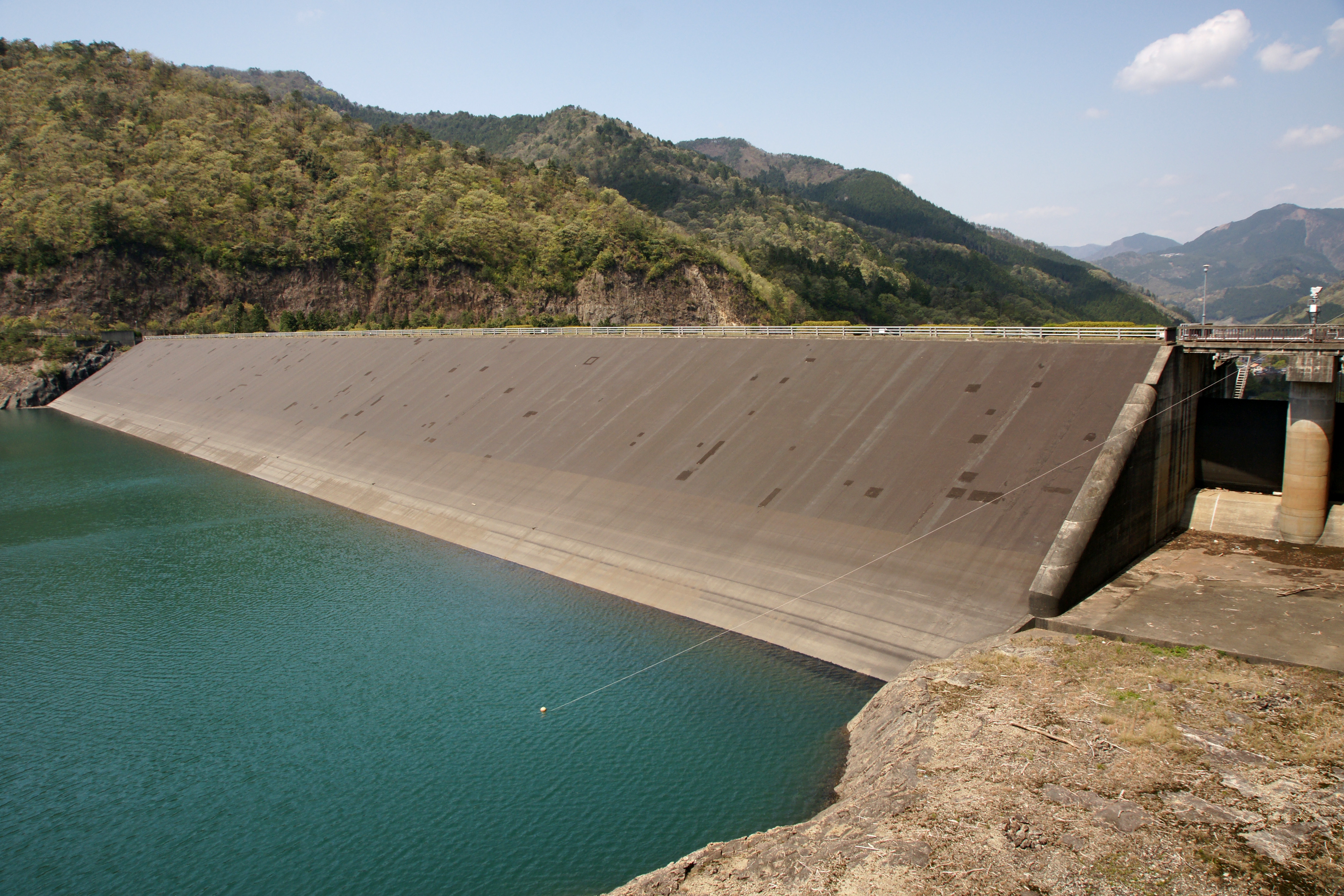
Tataragi Dam

== See also ==
- List of power stations in Japan
