= Takeda Station (Hyōgo) =

Railway station in Asago, Hyōgo Prefecture, Japan

Takeda Station 竹田駅
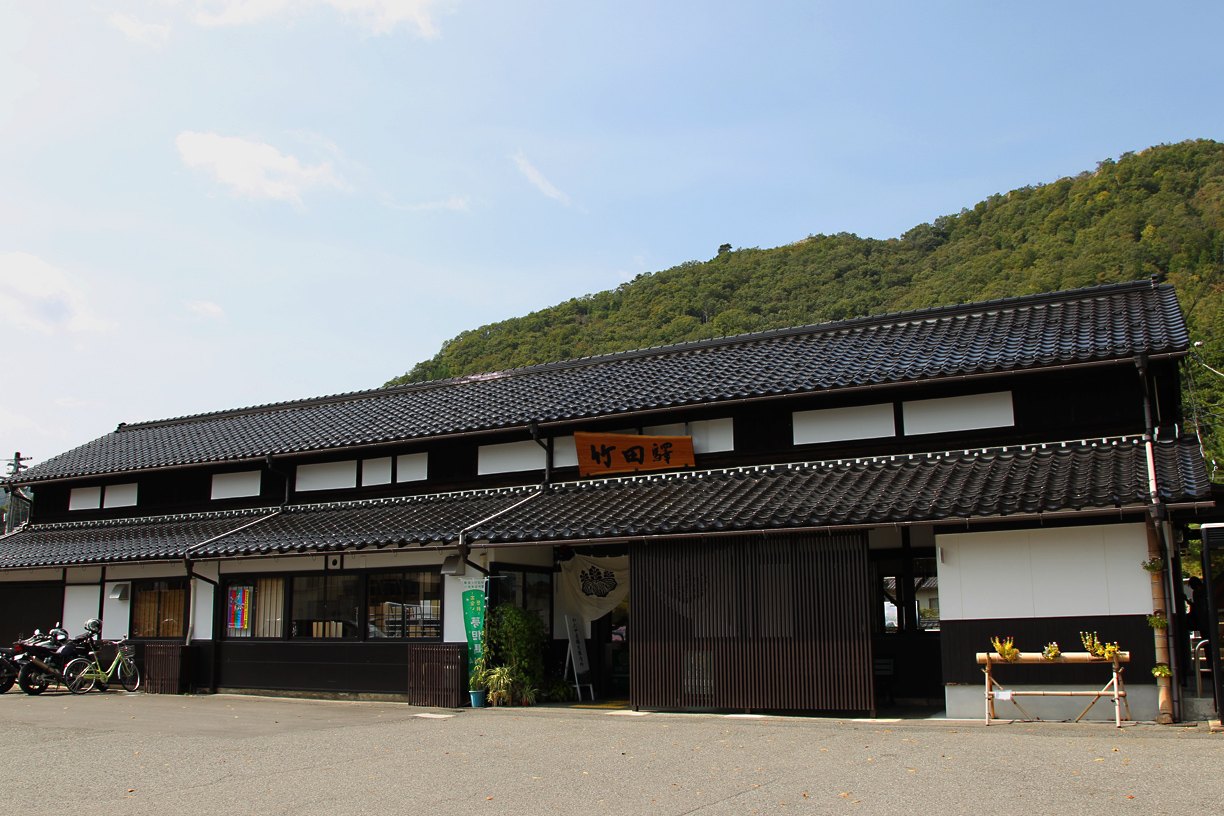
- Takeda Station, September 2014

General information
- Location: Wadayamacho Takeda, Asago-shi, Hyōgo-ken 669-5252; Japan
- Coordinates: 35°17′57″N 134°50′09″E
- Owner: West Japan Railway Company
- Operator: West Japan Railway Company
- Line: Bantan Line
- Distance: 59.9 km (37.2 miles) from Himeji
- Platforms: 2 side platform
- Connections: Bus stop

Other information
- Status: Staffed
- Website: Official website

History
- Opened: 1 April 1906

Passengers
- FY2016: 173 daily
Location
- Location within Hyōgo Prefecture Location within Japan

Takeda Station (竹田駅, Takeda-eki) is a passenger railway station located in the city of Asago, Hyōgo Prefecture, Japan, operated by West Japan Railway Company (JR West).

== Lines ==
Takeda Station is served by the Bantan Line, and is located 59.9 kilometers from the terminus of the line at Himeji.

== Station layout ==
The station consists of two opposed ground-level side platforms connected to the station building by a footbridge. The station is staffed.

=== Platforms ===
1	■ Bantan Line	for Teramae and Himeji
2	■ Bantan Line	for Wadayama

== Adjacent stations ==
«	Service	»
West Japan Railway Company (JR West) Bantan Line
Limited Express Hamakaze: Does not stop at this station
Aokura	Local	Wadayama

== History ==
Takeda Station opened on April 1, 1906. With the privatization of the Japan National Railways (JNR) on April 1, 1987, the station came under the aegis of the West Japan Railway Company.

== Passenger statistics ==
In fiscal 2016, the station was used by an average of 173 passengers daily

== Surrounding area ==
- Tachiunkyo Grge
- Takeda Castle ruins
- Maruyama River
- Japan National Route 312

== See also ==
- List of railway stations in Japan
