= Bantan Line =

Railway line in Hyogo prefecture, Japan

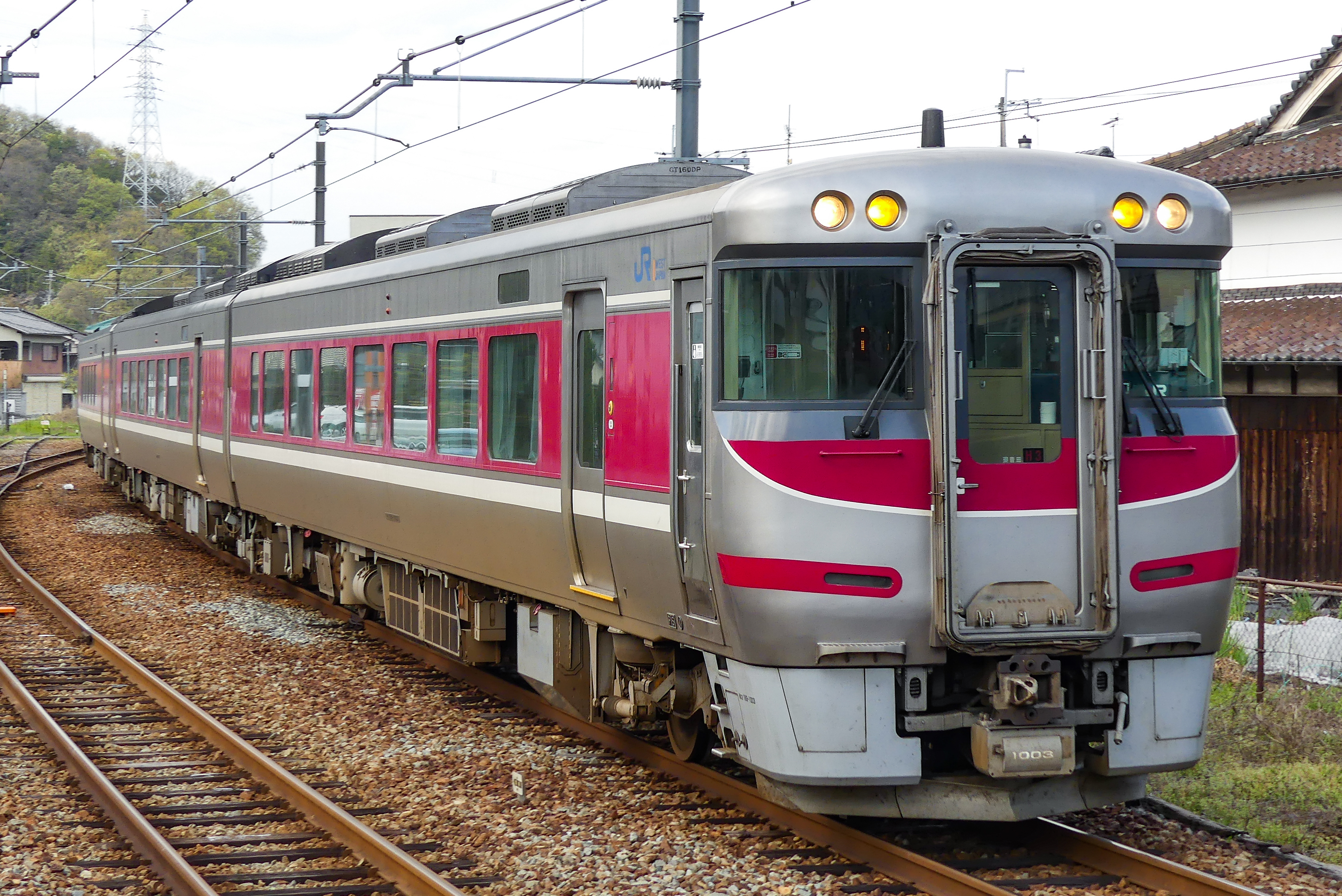
- KiHa 189 series DMU on a Hamakaze limited express service

Overview
- Locale: Hyōgo Prefecture
- Termini: Himeji; Wadayama
- Stations: 18

Service
- Operator(s): JR West
- Rolling stock: 103 series EMU, 221 series EMU, 223-6000 series EMU, KiHa 40/41 DMU, KiHa 189 series DMU

History
- Opened: 26 July 1894; 131 years ago
- Last extension: 1 April 1906; 120 years ago

Technical
- Line length: 65.7 km (40.8 mi)
- Track gauge: 1,067 mm (3 ft 6 in)
- Electrification: 1,500 V DC (overhead lines) (Himeji–Teramae)
- Operating speed: 95 km/h (59 mph) (Himeji–Fukusaki, Teramae–Wadayama); 110 km/h (68 mph) (Fukusaki–Teramae)
- Signalling: Special automatic closed block
- Train protection system: ATS-SW

The Bantan Line (播但線, Bantan-sen) is a railway line that connects Himeji and Wadayama station in Asago City, Hyōgo Prefecture, Japan. The line is operated by the West Japan Railway Company (JR West) and serves as a connector between the Sanyo Main Line and the Sanin Main Line. The name refers to the ancient provinces of Harima (播磨) and Tajima (但馬), which the line connects.

The line is 65.7 km (40.8 mi) long, with 18 stations.

== Service ==
Local train operation is divided into the electrified section between Himeji and Teramae, and the non-electrified section between Teramae and Wadayama. All local trains makes every stop on the line, and no local train runs the entire length of the line.

The Hamakaze limited express, which connects the Kinki region to the San'in region, uses the Bantan Line to access the Sanin Main Line.

== Stations ==
Station		Distance (km)	Transfers	Location	
Himeji^{1}	姫路	0.0	Sanyō Shinkansen; San'yō Main Line (JR Kobe Line); Kishin Line; Sanyo Railway Main Line (SY 43: Sanyo Himeji Station)	Himeji	Hyōgo Prefecture
Kyōguchi	京口	1.7		Himeji	Hyōgo Prefecture
Nozato	野里	4.3		Himeji	Hyōgo Prefecture
Tohori	砥堀	6.0		Himeji	Hyōgo Prefecture
Nibuno	仁豊野	8.2		Himeji	Hyōgo Prefecture
Kōro	香呂	11.2		Himeji	Hyōgo Prefecture
Mizoguchi	溝口	13.2		Himeji	Hyōgo Prefecture
Fukusaki^{1}	福崎	17.1		Fukusaki	Hyōgo Prefecture
Amaji	甘地	20.6		Ichikawa	Hyōgo Prefecture
Tsurui	鶴居	24.5		Ichikawa	Hyōgo Prefecture
Niino	新野	27.7		Kamikawa	Hyōgo Prefecture
Teramae^{1}	寺前	29.6		Kamikawa	Hyōgo Prefecture
Hase	長谷	35.9		Kamikawa	Hyōgo Prefecture
Ikuno^{1}	生野	43.6		Asago	Hyōgo Prefecture
Nii	新井	51.9		Asago	Hyōgo Prefecture
Aokura	青倉	55.6		Asago	Hyōgo Prefecture
Takeda^{1}	竹田	59.9		Asago	Hyōgo Prefecture
Wadayama^{1}	和田山	65.7	Sanin Main Line	Asago	Hyōgo Prefecture
Notes: 1. Hamakaze stop; Local trains stop at all stations. Local trains operate from Himeji to Teramae and from Teramae to Wadayama. Some rapid trains operate from Teramae to Wadayama, stopping at all stations except Hase.

== Rolling stock ==
- 103 series EMUs (since 1998)
- 221 series EMUs (since 2003, sometimes substituted by 223-6000 series)
- KiHa 40 series DMUs
- KiHa 189 series DMUs (Hamakaze limited express, since 2010)

=== Former ===
- 113 series EMUs (from 2006 until 2007)
- KiHa 10 series DMUs
- KiHa 58 series DMUs (Tajima express)
- KiHa 80 series DMUs (Hamakaze limited express, until 1982)
- KiHa 181 series DMUs (Hamakaze limited express, from 1982 until 2010)
- JNR 50 series coaches hauled by JNR Class DD51 or JNR Class DE10 locomotive (until 1992)

== History ==
The 29.6km section from Himeji north to Teramae was constructed by the private Bantan Railway (播但鉄道, Bantan Tetsudō) company and opened in 1894, with the 6.3km section to Hase opening in January the following year, and the 7.7km section to Ikuno three months later. The 8.3km section to Nii opened in 1901. The Bantan Railway was purchased by the Sanyō Railway (山陽鉄道, Sanyō Tetsudō) in 1903, which extended the line 13.8km to Wadayama, opening in April 1906, 8 months before the company was nationalised. Individual section opening dates are given below.

The line was named the Bantan Line in anticipation of the Sanyo Railway company being purchased by the Japanese government under the Railway Nationalisation Act of 1906.

The Bantan Railway Co. also built a ~15.7km line from Himeji east to Shikama-Kou (near Kakogawa), opened in 1895 and closed in 1986.

CTC signalling was commissioned between Himeji and Wadayama in 1978, and freight services ceased between 1984 and 1986. The Himeji - Teramae section was electrified in 1998.

=== Bantan Railway (north of Himeji) ===
- July 26, 1894: Himeji - Teramae opens.
- January 15, 1895: Teramae - Hase opens.
- April 17, 1895: Hase - Ikuno opens.
- August 19, 1896: Nibuno Station opens.
- February 20, 1898: Kyoguchi Station opens.
- March 28, 1898: Mizoguchi Station opens.
- August 29, 1901: Ikuno - Nii opens.

=== Sanyō Railway ===
- June 1, 1903: Sanyō Railway purchased Bantan Railway.
- April 1, 1906: Nii - Wadayama opens.
- October 12, 1906: Line renamed Bantan Line.

=== JNR/JR West ===
- December 1, 1906: Sanyō Railway company nationalised.
- October 15, 1925: Tofu-Machi Station closed.
- August 10, 1934: Aokura Station opens.
- November 20, 1935: Tohori Station opens.
- October 15, 1951: Niino Station opens.
- April 1, 1987: Japanese National Railways (JNR) was privatised and regionalised, with the line transferring to the West Japan Railway Company (JR West).
- March 14, 1998: Himeji - Teramae electrified.

=== Bantan Railway (east of Himeji) ===
- April 17, 1895: Himeji - Shikama Station (later Shikama-Kou Station) opened.
- November 20, 1897: Tenjin Station (later Shikama Station) opened.
- September 21, 1915: Shikama Station was renamed Shikama-Kou Station, and Tenjin Station was renamed Shikama Station.
- November 1, 1986: Himeji - Shikama-Kou closed.
