= Wadayama Station =

Railway station in Asago, Hyōgo Prefecture, Japan

Wadayama Station 和田山駅
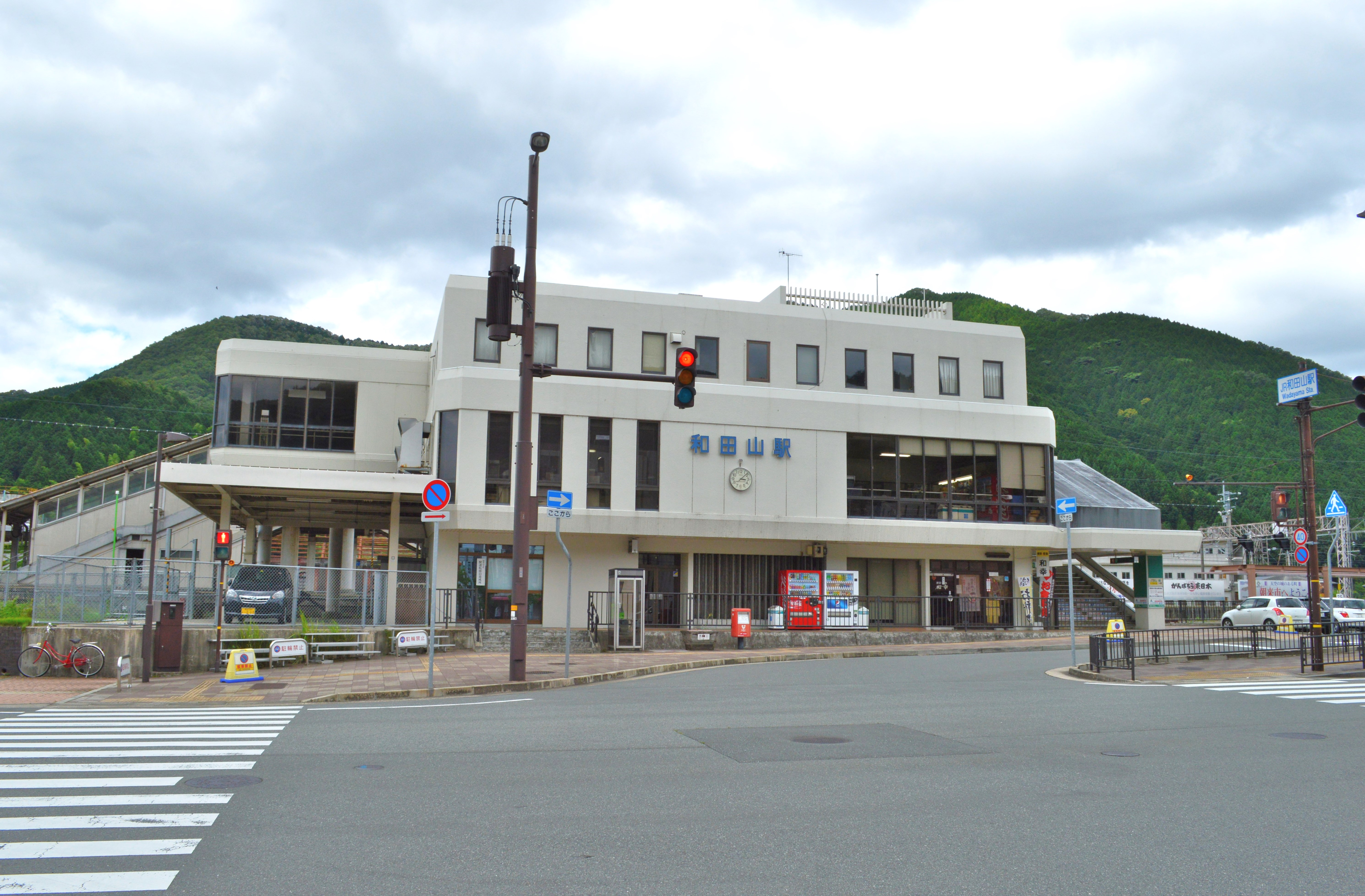
- Wadayama Station in Asago, Hyogo, Japan

General information
- Location: 184-5 Higashiya, Wadayama-chō, Asago-shi, Hyōgo-ken 669-5202; Japan
- Coordinates: 35°20′29″N 134°51′05″E
- Owner: West Japan Railway Company
- Operator: West Japan Railway Company
- Lines: San'in Main Line; Bantan Line
- Distance: 119.0 km (73.9 miles) from Kyoto
- Platforms: 2 island platforms

Construction
- Structure type: Ground level

Other information
- Status: Staffed
- Website: Official website

History
- Opened: 1 April 1906

Passengers
- FY 2023: 1,104 daily
Location
- Location within Hyōgo Prefecture Location within Japan

Wadayama Station (和田山駅, Wadayama-eki) is a passenger railway station located in the city of Asago, Hyōgo Prefecture, Japan, operated by West Japan Railway Company (JR West).

== Lines ==
Wadayama Station is served by the San'in Main Line, and is located 119.0 kilometers from the terminus of the line at Kyoto. It is also the northern terminus of the 65.7 kilometer Bantan Line from Himeji.

== Station layout ==
The station consists of two ground-level island platforms connected by an elevated station building. The station is staffed.

=== Platforms ===
1	■ San'in Main Line	for Kyoto and Osaka
2	■ San'in Main Line	for Toyooka and Kinosaki Onsen
3	■ Bantan Line	for Teramae and Himeji

== Adjacent stations ==
«	Service	»
San'in Main Line
Fukuchiyama	Limited Express Kounotori	Yōka
Fukuchiyama	Limited Express Kinosaki	Yōka
to Bantan Line	Limited Express Hamakaze	Yōka
Yanase	Local	Yabu
Bantan Line
Ikuno	Limited Express Hamakaze	to San'in Main Line
Takeda	Local	Terminus

== History ==
Wadayama Station opened on April 1, 1906. With the privatization of the Japan National Railways (JNR) on April 1, 1987, the station came under the aegis of the West Japan Railway Company.

== Passenger statistics ==
In fiscal 2016, the station was used by an average of 693 passengers daily

== Surrounding area ==
- Asago City Hall
- Wadayama Health Center

== See also ==
- List of railway stations in Japan
