= Harima =

Harima may refer to:

== Places ==
- Harima Chūbu Kyūryō Prefectural Natural Park a Prefectural Natural Park in southern Hyōgo Prefecture, Japan
- Harima Historical Museum
- Harima, Hyōgo a town located in Kako District, Hyōgo Prefecture, Japan
- Harima Kokubun-ji a Shingon-sect Buddhist temple
- Harima Province a province of Japan in the part of Honshū
- Harima Science Garden City a city constructed by opening up a hilly area in Harima
- Harima Sea is the eastern part of the Seto Inland Sea in Japan

Stations

- Harima Station
- Harima-Katsuhara Station
- Harima-Shimosato Station
- Harima-Shingū Station
- Harima-Tokusa Station
- Harima-Yokota Station

== Sports ==
- AS Harima Albion a women's football club
- Cento Cuore Harima FC a football (soccer) club

== People ==
- Hirokane Harima (播磨 浩謙; born 1998), Hong Kong former professional footballer
- Harima no Inabi no Ōiratsume (播磨稲日大郎姫), was the first wife of Emperor Keikō
- Harima no Tsubone (播磨局), Japanese female samurai warlord and chief of Amakusa clan

== Others ==
- Harima Expressway
- Harima no Kuni Fudoki
- Harima Sake Culture Tourism
- Ishikawajima-Harima F3
- Ishikawajima-Harima J3
- Rakuraku Harima
