= Harima no Kuni Fudoki =

Ancient Japanese report on local culture and geography in Harima Province

- 播磨国風土記
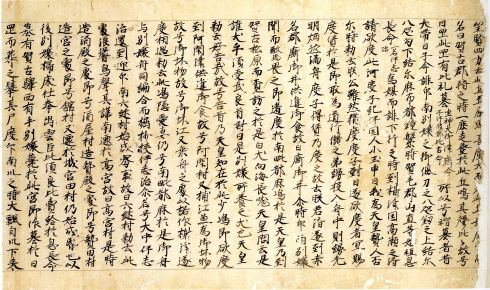
- The Sanjōnishike scroll of Harima no Kuni Fudoki
- Writing: Japanese calligraphy
- Created: c. first year of Reiki era, 715 (original)
- Discovered: 1796
- Place: Sanjōnishi family records
- Present location: Tenri Central Library, Tenri University, Nara Prefecture, Japan
- Period: Heian period (extant manuscript copy)

Harima no Kuni Fudoki (播磨国風土記) is a fudoki text describing Harima Province (in present-day Hyōgo Prefecture), which was compiled in the early Nara period. The manuscript copy of it dates from near the end of the Heian period, and it was designated a National Treasure in 1965.

== Compilation ==
The entry for the second day of the fifth month of the year Wadō 6 (713) in Nihon Shoki records that reports containing the following items were commanded to be submitted from provinces of Japan:

- record the names of gun (rural districts/counties) and sato (villages) with pleasant graphs (Chinese characters)
- products such as silver, copper, dyestuffs, herbaceous plants, trees, birds, fauna, insects, etc.
- soil fertility
- the origins of the names of mountains, rivers, plains and grasslands, etc.
- tales and unusual stories passed down by the elders

These gebumi (解文, official documents to be submitted to a higher authority) about the situation in the province eventually came to be called fudoki (literally, “records of customs” or “gazetteers”). As gebumi, their prefaces were written in a specific format, but in the Harima no Kuni Fudoki manuscript this is missing, and is not verified. Nevertheless, it is evident that it was written as a ge document, as one phrase says “the same as the aforementioned ge.”

There is no extant documentation that provides the date of compilation of Harima no Kuni Fudoki, but it must have been around the first year of Reiki (715 CE). The grounds for this are that local government administrative divisions were revised from kuni (国), kōri (郡) and sato (里), to kuni (国), kōri (郡), sato (郷) and ri (里) in the first year of Reiki (715 CE) or Reiki 3 (717 CE), and Harima no Kuni Fudoki employs the former. While it could have been compiled later but adhered to the earlier usage, and there are indeed some inconsistencies in some other nomenclature, the orthography of sato is without exception in the former style, so that is considered unlikely. This means that the compilation took place between 713 and 715, when the kokushi (国司, provincial governors) of Harima were Kose no Ōji (巨勢邑治), Ōishi no Ō (大石王), Ishikawa no Kimiko (石川君子), and the daisakan (大目, fourth in the official hierarchy, scribe) was Sasanami/Takaoka no Kawachi (楽浪河内/高岡河内).

Traces of deliberate changes are fewer in Harima no Kuni Fudoki compared to the other fudoki, so the local stories are relatively unadulterated by the editors. It has several distinctive features, such as that the style is Japanese-influenced kanbun (漢文, classical Chinese style) similar to that of Kojiki; it appears to be a draft; and it is relatively unpretentious in style. In that sense, it contrasts with Hitachi no Kuni Fudoki (常陸国風土記), which has more kanseki (漢籍, Classical Chinese) aspects.

There are certain local differences in the style of writing. On this basis, the kōri (郡, rural district, county) sections are divisible into three groups: (a) Kako (賀古), Inami (印南) and Minagi (美嚢) (Minō); (b) Shikama (飾磨), Kamusaki (神前), Taka (託賀) and Kamo (賀毛); and (c) Ihibo (揖保, Ibo), Sayo (讃容) and Shisawa (宍禾) (Shisō). Two theories have been proposed for these three groupings. The first is that it mirrors the jurisdiction of the three kuni no miyatsuko (国造, local hereditary lords) of Akashi no Kuni (明石国), Harima no Kuni (針間国), and Harima no Kamo no Kuni (針間鴨国) prior to the introduction of the ritsuryō legal system, and that their spheres of influence were reflected in the tales and information collected for the compilation of Harima no Kuni Fudoki. Another theory is that they reflect the circumstances of the collection of such information by the data collectors of the time. It could have been a difference caused by dividing up then work of collection according to the river catchments and roads along the Kako River, the Ichi River, the Ibo River and the Chikusa River.

== Text transmission ==
There is only one extant manuscript of Harima no Kuni Fudoki: the Sanjōnishikebon (三条西家本) scroll copied at the end of the Heian period, which was in the collection of the Sanjōnishi family. The manuscript is designated a National Treasure, and it is held in the collection of Tenri Central Library. There being no other copies, and because the existence of the Sanjōnishi family scroll was unknown for a long time, only parts of Harima no Kuni Fudoki were known as fragmenta cited in other works. However, Yanagihara Norimitsu seems to have been the first to copy the manuscript, privately, in 1796. Later, Tanimori Yoshiomi verified that it was held by the Sanjōnishi family, copied it and revealed it to the world in Kaei 5 (1852 CE). Research into it got going in the Meiji period: Shikida Toshiharu (敷田年治) produced Hyōchū Harima Fudoki (標註古風土記, Harima Fudoki with commentary and notes) in 1864, but did not publish it until 1899; Kurita Hiroshi published Hyōchū Ko Fudoki (標註古風土記, Ancient Fudoki with commentary and notes [Harima]) in 1899; and most-significantly Inoue Michiyasu published his ground-breaking work of scholarship Harima Fudoki Shinkō (播磨風土記新考, New Thoughts on Harima no Kuni Fudoki) in 1931.

Harima no Kuni Fudoki is one of only five more-or-less complete extant fudoki, but it is not as complete as Izumo no Kuni Fudoki (出雲国風土記). It is missing the introductory overview of Harima province, the whole of the entry for Akashi Kōri, the heading for Kako Kōri (modern-day Kakogawa) and the whole of Akaho Kōri (modern-day Akō). The reason why it is assumed that the above-mentioned sections have been lost is because each kōri in Harima Province is consistently described in a roughly clockwise sequence from southeast to southwest, northwest to northeast, and the absence of those sections breaks that pattern. Fragments of the Akashi Kōri entry are cited in Shaku Nihongi (釈日本紀), such as the Hayatori (速鳥, "Fast Bird") tale, so there is no doubt that Akashi Kōri was originally included, but there are no clues as to what the situation is regarding the missing section on Akaho Kōri. Possible reasons are that it was never included, was included but is lost, or that the extant text was a draft from which Akaho Kōri was omitted. Apart from the above, there is an entry for Inami Kōri but it lacks the kōri’s name heading. It might have been originally included but was omitted in copying; or perhaps Inami Kōri was not formed until some time after the compilation of Harima Fudoki, when it might still have been administered as part of Kako Kōri, and was therefore entered in the fudoki as Inami Ura (Bay).

Because there is nothing for Akaho Kōri, and that there are inconsistencies in the section on Shikama Kōri, etc., it is generally accepted by academics that the extant version of Harima no Kuni Fudoki had not yet had its final editing carried out in the Provincial Office (kokuchō). When this theory was first proposed, it was assumed that the whole of the present text was only partially edited, but nowadays the mainstream of thought is that the text derives from when only additional (appended or inserted) passages remained to be edited.

== Harima's response to the official Wadō order ==
Of the five items included in the official order for the compilation of fudoki, those to which Harima no Kuni Fudoki most conscientiously responds are those relating to soil fertility, the origins of place names, and local stories. Its structure is roughly as follows: the name of the kōri; the origin of the kōri name; the sato name; the fertility of the soil in the sato; the origins of the sato name; the names of mura (hamlets), mountains, rivers, etc., within the sato; the origin of that name; the next sato name, and so forth. In several of the sato entries, notable products are listed, and place name changes are noted for several sato; but there are fewer of these than are recorded in Izumo no Kuni Fudoki.

The order unequivocally requests that place names be written with two pleasant Chinese characters. At this time representations of Japanese pronunciations were being written in man'yōgana (万葉仮名), which is to say, particular characters were employed as phonograms: for their sound—contemporaneous approximation of Japanese pronunciation—rather than for their meaning. For example, the mountainous district called Taka Kōri self-evidently means, literally, “High District.” The place name Taka could possibly have been written with the graph (高) meaning "high", but the Wadō order specifies that place names should be expressed with two graphs. Thus the name was written with the characters (託賀) for their sound, combined with the auspicious meanings.

The compilers of Harima no Kuni Fudoki complied quite consistently with the order to use pleasant graphs. An extreme example of this appears, which says that the entry explaining the origin of the place name Ikuno (生野), which literally means “Living Moor”, was originally Shinino (死野, “Death Moor”); and that it was changed because King Homuda (品太天皇) said it was too “bad” as a place name. From this entry it may be inferred that the practice of rendering place names with pleasant meanings had already been preferred for a long time, and therefore that the Wadō order was merely formalising an established custom. This preference reflected superstitious belief in kotodama (言霊), the spirit of speech, a kind of magical thinking whereby the utterance of a word was thought to be sufficiently powerful to bring about or conjure up the thing spoken of.

The fertility of the soil was a question no doubt raised by the Nara Court for cadastral purposes. People subjected to taxation tend to respond with circumspection, and the issue is avoided in the fudoki for other provinces. In Harima no Kuni Fudoki, however, soil fertility is recorded in considerable detail: in almost all the sato the soil is evaluated according to 9 categories using upper, medium and lower, from “upper upper” to “lower lower”. None is actually assessed as "upper upper”, and given that no other extant fudoki texts provide this information at all, it may well be that in Harima they recorded all the fertility levels as one lower than in actuality to minimise their tax levy.

Tanaka and Matsushita (1994) compared Fudoki's assessment with the yields of rice per tan in the relevant kōri/gun for 1885, which found that with few exceptions there was a fairly good correspondence between the two. The exceptions were Kako-gun and Sayo-gun, where in fudoki the report for Kako Kōri was lower and that for Sayo Kōri was higher. Many reservoirs were constructed in Kako-gun in the Meiji period, which increased yields, and that may account for the discrepancy.

The discrepancy for Sayo Kōri remains unexplained. The evaluation might have been based on the taste of the rice that the land produced. It took into consideration the geomorphology and drainage of each sato in order to determine the flavour of the rice. It found that the sato with a high grade were places with clay soils and good irrigation, while those with a low grade were flood-prone soils with poor drainage. This method also showed a good correlation, and in the various sato in Sayo Kōri which were not explained previously, a higher grade was evident. Sayo Kōri is located in the westernmost part of Harima Province, and it may have been given a higher evaluation than other kōri due to its remoteness.

== Place names ==
Map of Japanese provinces (1868) with Harima Province highlighted

More than 360 place names are recorded in Harima no Kuni Fudoki. The origins of place names and local tales, myths and legends form the bulk of the text, as in the other fudoki, and that accords with the two items of the government order pertaining to the origins of the names of mountains, rivers, plains and grasslands, and the stories passed down by the elders. There is no strict division between the two items, and all but two of the local tales are linked to place name origins.

Apart from the names of kōri (administrative districts), sato (administrative villages), mura (natural hamlets), mountains, rivers, plains, moors (uncultivated land), place names include kofun (grave sites), wells, harbours, shrines, etc. There are 81 sato, and Ihibo Kōri contains the most, with 18. One sato is estimated to contain a population of about 1,000 people, which means that Ihibo Kōri would have had a population of about 18,000. The total number of sato at the time of the compilation of Harima no Kuni Fudoki is unknown on account of the missing sections for Akashi and Akaho, but judging by Wamyō Ruijushō (和名類聚抄) there were about 95 sato, making the population close to 100,000.

The entries which record the origins of place names range from simple ones that say “because of x it came to be called y;” to those which are more narrative, specifying a time period, protagonists, and what they did; to those which link all such elements together.

Some place names are straightforwardly descriptive, such as Suzume-shima ("Sparrow Island"). Others evoke their silhouette on the landscape, such as Kabuto-oka ("Helmet Hill"). On the other hand, kunitama (the spirit of the land) resided in the place name, and revelation of it to outsiders denoted surrender of local autonomy to external authorities. The aims of the Nara government in recording place names were not only for pragmatic cadastral purposes, but also to consolidate ideological control over the newly-formed nation state.

Entries in which a person is named include those that are actually about that person and those that specify a time period (e.g., “in the time of King…”). In Harima no Kuni Fudoki they include deities, kings (emperors) and royalty, nobles and commoners. Entries for the origins of place names that involve a deity or a king seem to be included with the intention of stressing that this place had a distinguished history. Whereas stories in Izumo no Kuni Fudoki are predominantly about deities, and those in Hitachi no Kuni Fudoki, Hizen no Kuni Fudoki and Bungo no Kuni Fudoki are more about people, including kings, those in Harima Fudoki are a mixture of both.

Some place name stories about deities recount that the very existence of the deity there is its origin, while others are because the deity did something there. For example, they may have said something, dropped something, tussled with another deity for occupation—with an origin story accordingly. Local deities such as Iwa no Ōkami (伊和大神, the Great Deity of Iwa) frequently appear; he is unique to Harima.

Several of the deities are araburu kami (malevolent entities), particularly those that kill people by disrupting transportation or preventing them from settling in a particular place.

Like deities, kings are portrayed as authority figures, and in Harima Fudoki they are typically visiting Harima on royal progresses. As in the case of deities, place name origins are said to be because while the king was on a royal progress he said something, dropped something, performed kunimi (land viewing), or went hunting.

Local tendencies can be seen in the content of the tales. Roughly speaking, there is a higher proportion of tales naming a king in entries for southeastern Harima, while there is a higher proportion naming a deity in the northwestern parts. Being nearer to the Kinai area, the Yamato polity had greater sway from earlier on in the southeast, whereas Harima's autonomy persisted longer in the northwest.

Among the common people who appear as protagonists, there are entries about government officials, and entries relating to the immigration of individuals and communities. That there are comparatively more entries about immigration and cultural exchange is another distinctive feature of Harima no Kuni Fudoki. These include passages about movements from other areas in Harima and from neighbouring provinces, and even from the Korean Peninsula.

Most of those that relate to immigration from the continental mainland (toraijin (和名類聚抄)) are in the kōri of Ihibo and Shikama. This is corroborated by the fact that most relics and archaeological sites relating to continental immigrants in Harima have been found along the Inland Sea coast centred on those two kōri. So saying, they do not necessarily coincide at the sato level. Tales about Ame no Hiboko, who is considered to be a deity of Korean immigrants, are thought to represent them symbolically. That stories about him are narrated as myth rather than fact is deemed to be because such immigrant groups had already become acculturated into Harima over a long period by the time Harima no Kuni Fudoki was compiled.

A recent dimension to the study of Harima no Kuni Fudoki in conjunction with archaeological evidence suggests that the seafaring ama communities based around Ōsaka Bay and the Inland Sea played an important role in the formation of the Yamato state.

== Selected stories in Harima no Kuni Fudoki ==
=== Ōtarashihiko no mikoto (King Keikō) and Inami no Waki Iratsume (Inabi no Ōiratsuhime) ===
Ōtarashihiko (大帯日子) wore the sacred comma-shaped bead tied to the upper cord fastener of his sacred long sword, and reached Akashi Kōri to woo Inami no Waki Iratsume (印南別嬢) for her hand in marriage. When Waki Iratsume heard about this she was astonished, and fled to hide at Nabitsuma (南毗都麻) Island. (Note: There was a custom that women to whom marriage was to be proposed went into hiding. A similar such tale appears in the entry for Uka Sato, Izumo Kōri, in Izumo no Kuni Fudoki.) While he was asking after her at Kako no Matsubara (賀古松原, Kako Pine Grove), he came across a dog that was facing out to sea and howling. Realising that this must be Waki Iratsume's dog, the King crossed to the island. Because it was where his wife (tsuma) hid (nabita), it was called Nabitsuma Island. Having found her, the King proposed and they married.

Many years passed. Waki Iratsume died, and she was to be interred at Hioka. Her body was placed in a boat to cross the Inami River, but just then a whirlwind blew up and swirled her remains into the river. They searched for her remains to no avail. All that they found were her comb box and a thin stole, which they placed in her tomb. That was why it was called Hirehaka (Scarf Tomb) — now known as Hioka Ryōkofun.

The King grieved and said “We shall not eat the fish from this river.” From then on, the ayu (年魚, sweetfish) of this river were no longer served at the royal table.

=== Ōnamuchi (Ōkuninushi) and Ame no Hoakari no mikoto ===
Ōnamuchi's son, Hoakari no mikoto, was wild and out of control. Ōnamuchi was in despair at him and decided to abandon him. When they arrived at the sacred hill of Idate (因達), he sent Hoakari off to fetch some water. While he was away, Ōnamuchi set off again by boat and fled. As soon as Hoakari discovered he had been marooned, he flew into a rage, conjured up a gale, and caused Ōnamuchi's boat to capsize. The "fourteen surrounding hills" were named after the boat, the waves and the flotsam that fell from the boat:

- Idate no Kami Yama (因達神山, the sacred hill of Idate): the hill where Hoakari was abandoned. Now called Hachijōganzan (八丈岩山).
- Funa-oka (船丘): where the boat sank (now Keifukuji-yama (景福寺山)).
- Nami-oka (波丘): where Hoakari conjured up waves (now Nago-yama (名古山)).
- Himeji-oka (日女道丘): where his silkworms fell (now Hime-yama, on which Himeji Castle now stands).
- Kotokami-oka (琴神丘): the hill where his koto landed (now Yakushi-yama).
- Hako-oka (箱丘): the hill where his box landed (now Otoko-yama).
- Kushige-oka (匣丘): the hill where his comb box landed (now either Funakoshi-yama or Binjiku-yama).
- Mikata-oka (箕形丘): the hill where his winnow landed (now Chichibu-yama).
- Mika-oka (甕丘): the hill where his sake bottle landed (now Miko-oka).
- Inamure-oka (稲牟礼丘): the hill where his sheaves of rice landed (now Ina-oka).
- Kabuto-oka (冑丘): the hill where his helmet landed (now Kabuto-yama).
- Fuji-oka (藤丘): the hill where his rope landed (in the vicinity of Nikai-machi, to the south of Himeji Castle).
- Ikari-oka (沈石丘): the hill where his anchor-stone landed (unknown location).
- Shika-oka (鹿丘): the hill where his deer landed (unknown location).
- Inu-oka (犬丘): the hill where his dog landed (unknown location).

=== Ashihara no Shikoo (Ōkuninushi), Iwa no Ōkami, Ōkami and Amenohiboko ===
In Harima no Kuni Fudoki, the three names of native deities who compete with Ame no Hiboko for occupation of the land are Ashihara no Shikoo, Iwa no Ōkami, and Ōkami. There is much academic discussion whether these are different deities, or whether they are just different names for the same deity.

Amenohiboko, a deity who immigrated from the Korean Peninsula, reached the estuary of the Uzu River (宇頭川, Ibo River). He demanded lodgings of the native deity, Ashihara no Shikoo (葦原志挙乎). Shiko told him he could stay in the sea. Thereupon, Ame no Hiboko plunged the tip of his sword in the water, swirled it around, and settled on it. Shikoo was alarmed by Ame no Hiboko's bold stance. He headed upstream, thinking that he must stake his claim to the land first. He stopped to eat on the top of a hill, where he dropped some grains of rice. For that reason, it was called Ihibo-oka (粒丘, Rice-Grain Hill).

Ashihara no Shikoo and Ame no Hiboko each hurled three vine-ropes from a hill. Shikoo's first one landed in Mikata (御方), Shisaha Kōri, and his other two landed in Keta Kōri and Yabu Kōri in Tajima Province. All three of Ame no Hiboko's landed in Tajima Province, so it came about that Ame no Hiboko settled in Izushi in Tajima.

Passages in which a deity or king drops something connote that the place where it fell is under the power of that deity or sovereign. Such tales have aspects of ukehi or ukei (誓), a type of ancient Japanese divination.

=== Ōnamuchi (Ōkuninushi) and Sukunahikone ===
Ōnamuchi and Sukunahikone wondered, “Who could last longer, carrying a load of clay or not defecating?” They agreed that Ōnamuchi would walk on holding in his bowel movements, while Sukunahikone would carry the load of clay. After several days, Ōnamuchi exclaimed, “I can't go on any longer!” and relieved himself there and then. Sukunahikone laughed, “I'm exhausted too!” and dumped his load of clay (堲, hani) on the hill, causing it to be named Hani-oka (堲岡, Clay Hill). While Ōnamuchi was defecating, the flattened bamboo grass sprang back and spattered his clothes with excrement. For that reason, it is called Hajika Mura (波自加村, Rebound Village). The excrement and clay combined and are still there to this day.

=== Giant ===
In olden days there was a giant who always walked with a stoop. He travelled all over the country, but when he reached Taka District, he said, "Everywhere else the sky was so low that I had to stoop to walk, but here it is high, so I can stretch my back straight. How high it is!” That is why it was called Taka Kōri (託賀郡, "High" Kōri). The giant's footsteps turned to numerous ponds.

A similar tale of a giant appears in the entry for Naka Kōri (那賀郡) in Hitachi no Kuni Fudoki.

=== Oracular sake ===
A deity called Michinushihime (道主日女) resided in Arata Mura (荒田村). She gave birth to a baby without a father. She decided to brew some sake to divine who the baby's father was. She cultivated 7 chō (nearly 7 hectares) of paddy fields, and the rice grew in seven days and seven nights. She used it to brew sake, and invited all the other deities to a party. Her son poured the sake for the one-eyed deity Ame no ma Hitotsu (天目一). Thereby, she divined that he was the child's father. The fields where she had grown the rice were abandoned, which is why the place was called Arata (overgrown rice field).

There is a similar tale about oracular sake being used to divine an unknown father of a child, Kamo no Wake Ikazuchi no mikoto, in Yamashiro no Kuni Fudoki Itsubun.

In Harima no Kuni Fudoki there is also the following entry: “Ōkami's dried rice turned bad and mouldy. So he had sake brewed with it and held a party.” This is the earliest written reference in Japan to the brewing of sake from rice.

=== Oke (Emperor Ninken) and Woke (Emperor Kenzō) ===
King Ichibe (市辺天皇) (elsewhere known as Prince Ichibe no Oshiha (市辺押磐皇子)) was assassinated at Kutawata-no in Ōmi Province. He was the father of boys called Oke (later to be Emperor Ninken) and Woke (later to be Emperor Kenzō), who fled to hide in a rock overhang at Shijimi Sato in Minagi Kōri, along with Kusakabe no Muraji Omi (日下部連意美). Later on, Kusakabe no Muraji Omi, recognising the gravity of his crime (i.e., of absconding with the royal princes), cut loose their horses, burned all their belongings, and committed suicide. Oke and Woke roamed the countryside incognito, until they entered into the service of Itomi (伊等尾), the headman of Shijimi Village. At festivities held by Itomi, the younger brother – Woke – sang a song in which he revealed their identity. This was notified to a government official in Harima province, Yamabe no Muraji Odate. Odate met the two princes and told them that their mother, Tashiraga no mikoto, was worrying herself sick about them. Odate went to the capital, reported the circumstances to the Court, and the two princes were welcomed back into the royal family.

Oke and Woke revisited this district and maintained palaces and miyake (granaries) there. While they were staying in one of these palaces, they sought the hand in marriage of Nehime no mikoto, the daughter of Koma, the kuni no miyatsuko (official) of Harima no Kamo. Nehime responded affirmatively, but Oke and Woke each yielded to the other, so the marriage talks stalled, until eventually Nehime passed away. The two princes grieved deeply, and directed Odate to “construct a burial mound for her in a place where it gets both the morning and evening sunshine. Decorate the mound with tama (玉, cobblestones).” The mound was called Tama-oka (now the Tamaoka Kofun Cluster), and the hamlet constructed to service it was called Tama-no.
