= Kako River (Japan) =

River in Hyōgo Prefecture, Japan

Kako River 加古川
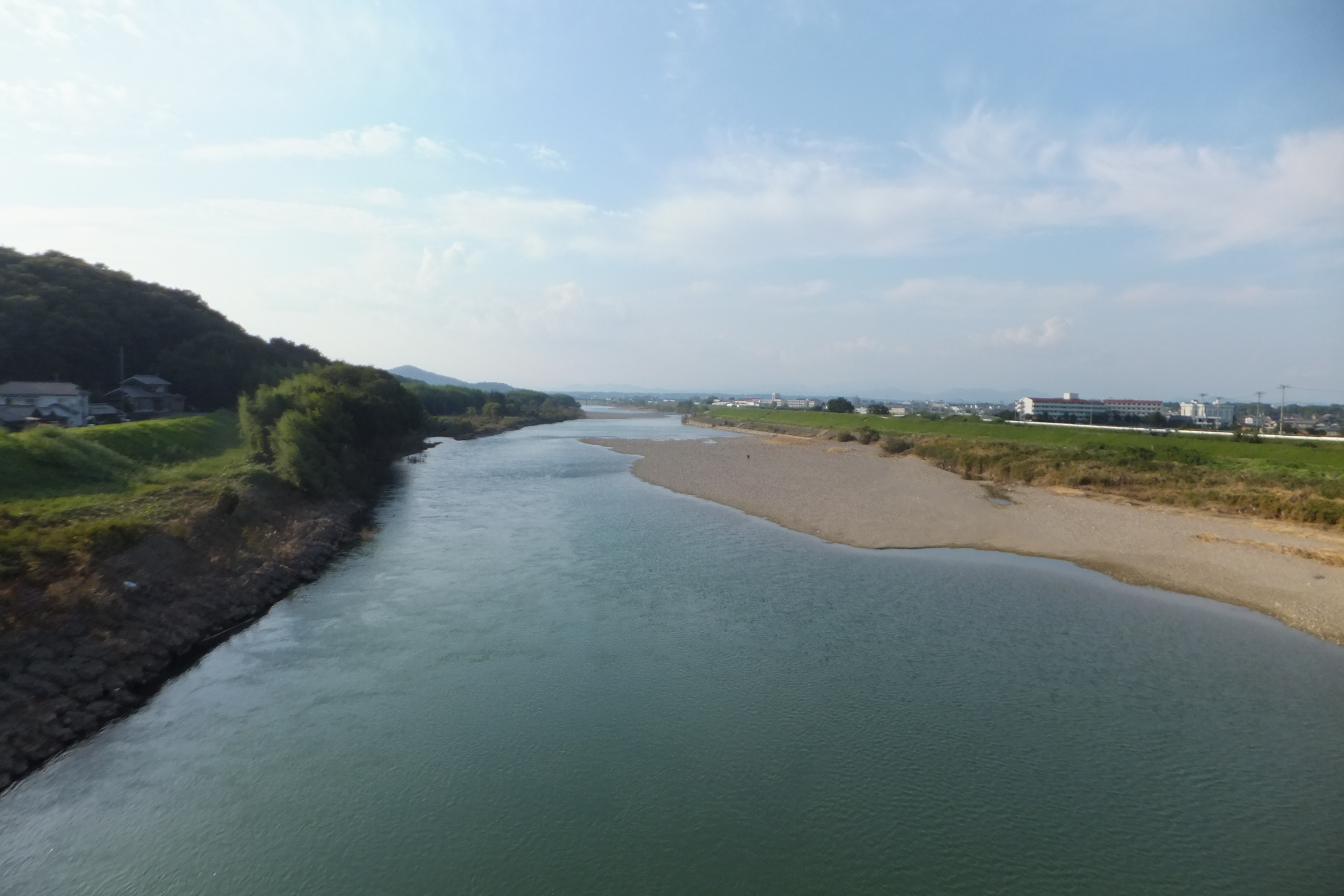
- The Kako River, viewed from a bridge in Ono.

- Location within Japan
- Native name: 加古川 (Japanese); Kako-gawa (Japanese)

Location
- Country: Japan
- Prefecture: Hyōgo

Physical characteristics
- Source: Mount Awaga
  - location: Hyōgo Prefecture
  - coordinates: 35°15′43″N 134°54′58″E
  - elevation: 962 m (3,156 ft)
- Mouth: Harima Sea
  - location: Hyōgo Prefecture
  - coordinates: 34°43′57″N 134°48′27″E
  - elevation: 0 m (0 ft)
- Length: 96 km (60 mi)
- Basin size: 1,730 km^{2} (670 mi^{2})
- Discharge
  - location: Kakogawa
  - average: 51.82 m^{3} (1,830 cu ft)

Basin features
- Population: 640,000

The Kako River (加古川, Kako-gawa) is a river that flows through Hyōgo Prefecture, Japan. It is the largest river system in Hyōgo Prefecture by basin area, encompassing 21% of the prefecture's land area. It rises at Mount Awaga, and flows 96 kilometres (60 mi) south, reaching the Harima Sea and forming part of the border between Kakogawa and Takasago cities. The Ministry of Land, Infrastructure, Transport and Tourism (MLIT) has designated the Kako River system as Class A.

Since the Yayoi period, the river has been used for water, irrigation, recreation, transportation, defense, and trade. The Toryu-nada rocks near Kamitakino are a popular tourist spot. The river hosts a diverse ecosystem, and is known for its ayu sweetfish, for which there is an annual festival.

== Geography ==
The Kako River originates from Mount Awaga, 962 metres (3,156 ft) above sea level. Flowing through Tamba and Nishiwaki, it joins the Sugihara and Noma rivers, before continuing south through Ono and Miki, where it is combined with the Tojo, Manganji, and Mishuku rivers. It reaches the Harima Sea at Onoe-chō, where it forms part of the border between Kakogawa and Takasago.

The river has a length of 96 kilometres (60 mi) and a basin area of 1,730 square kilometres (670 sq mi). Among the river systems in Hyōgo Prefecture, it has the largest basin area, which encompasses 21% of Hyōgo Prefecture's land area. The Kako River system contains 129 tributary rivers. Within the basin, 59% of the land is considered mountainous, 26% is agricultural land, 11% is residential land, and 4% is used for other purposes.

=== Municipalities ===
The Kako River basin encompasses eleven cities and three towns. These include:

- Tamba
- Tamba-Sasayama
- Nishiwaki
- Taka
- Katō
- Ono
- Sanda
- Miki
- Kasai
- Kakogawa
- Inami
- Takasago
- Himeji
- Toyono (in Osaka Prefecture)

Six national parks have been designated in the river's vicinity, including the Setonaikai National Park. In 2017, the population of the basin area was estimated to be 640,000.

== Name ==
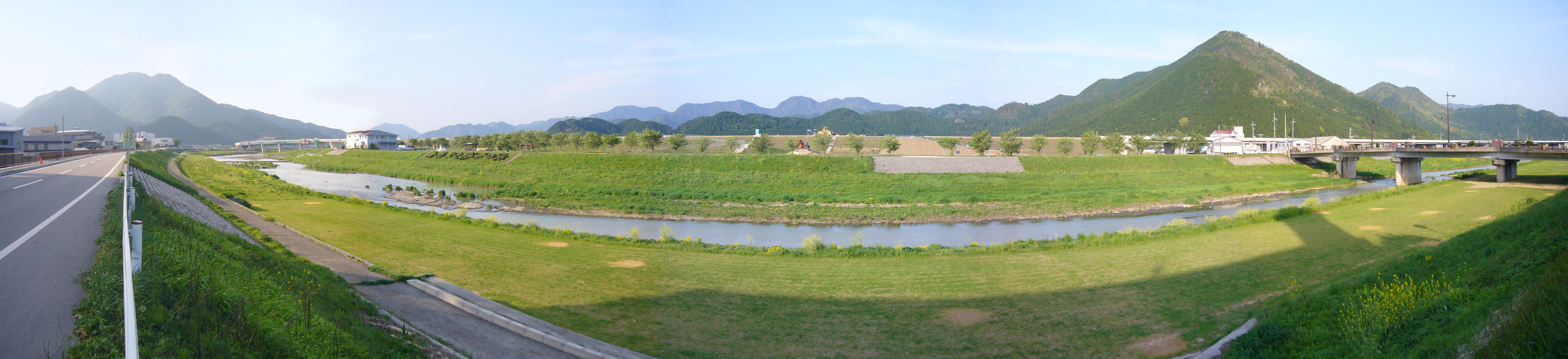
Panorama of the Kako River, taken in Tamba.

In the Harima Fudoki, the river is known as Inami-gawa (印南川). The following excerpt from the Harima Fudoki refers to the administrative area known as Kako Kōri.

(The Sovereign) gazed out all around and declared, “This country is very open, with [low] hills and undulating plains. When I look at this hill, it looks like a fawn.” Hence it is called Kako Kōri.

Japanese studies scholar Edwina Palmer's hypothesis is that either the shape of the hill looks like the rounded back of a fawn, or that the hill resembles a fawn because deer give birth to only one fawn, and the hill stands alone. However, she also states that the true etymology of the name is likely derived from kako (水夫; oarsman).

The Japan Historical Placenames Compendium (日本歴史地名大系, Nihon Rekishi Chimei Taikei) posits that the Harima Glacier (針間の氷河, Harima-no-hyōga) named in the Kojiki refers to the Kako River.

By the Kamakura period the name "Kako River" had already been established, appearing in a poem written by the Minister of Civil Affairs in 1267 for a poetry contest. The name also appears in some documents as Kako-gawa (賀古川).

The Japan Historical Placenames Compendium also lists other theories as to the name's origin.

- The name Kako-suimon (鹿子水門; lit. Deer-child-floodgate) appears in the Nihon Shoki, and refers to the area around the mouth of the river. It is assumed that a port existed there since ancient times.
- The Shoku Nihongi from 789 CE mentions Kako-funase (水児船瀬; lit. Helmsman-landing).

== History ==
=== Pre-Asuka period ===
Humans have inhabited the area surrounding the Kako River since at least the Yayoi period. Many Yayoi period ruins are found in the wetlands surrounding the river. At that time, waterway technology was undeveloped, so rice paddies and villages were formed by planting rice in wetlands or selecting areas in alluvial fans where water could easily drain. It is apparent that there were many battles during this period, and many of the area's villages were defended by moats. The area also includes traces of human occupation from the Kofun period.

Towards the middle of the Yayoi period, highland settlements began to appear from the Seto Inland Sea coast to Osaka Bay. These comprise a number of ruins found throughout most of Hyōgo Prefecture. These settlements were known to have been permanent settlements between 50 metres (160 ft) and 300 metres (980 ft) above sea level, featuring pit dwellings, outdoor hearths, storehouses, waste sites, ritual sites, and tombs.

=== Asuka and Kamakura periods ===
In the year 607, a dam was constructed on the lower reaches of the river under Prince Shōtoku. Boat transport using the Kako River seems to have been active since 701 CE, with records stating that there was a ferry dock built in Noguchi Village (present day Kakogawa City). The Ōbe Estate was established in the area in 1147.

In 1225, a village called "Kunikane" was washed away during a heavy flood. There is also evidence that another dam was constructed towards the middle of the river during this period.

=== Late Sengoku to early Edo period ===
After Toyotomi Hideyoshi subdued the area towards the end of the Sengoku period, boat transport using the Kako River became much more prevalent. The political and economic centre of Japan moved from Kyoto to Osaka, and the route for transporting rice tributes changed accordingly. Almost all of Hyōgo Prefecture became the territory of the Hideyoshi Clan after the unification of the country, but during the Edo period, Terumasa Ikeda was given 520,000 koku of land in the area. Himeji Castle was built on this land in 1607.

The development of the shipping routes can be divided into two periods. In the first period in 1594, Hikobei and Saburoemon dredged the route from Takasago to Daimon, and Ae Yosuke dredged the route from Daimon to Takino. In the second period (1604–1606), Ae Yosuke and Nishimura Dennyusai dredged the route from Takino to Funamachi.

Taking advantage of the increased boat traffic, the Ikeda Clan set up ships in Takino and Takada to collect customs duties, with a price of 51 momme. Docks and distribution facilities began to spring up in various places along the Kako River by this point. In particular, the towns of Takino, Shinmachi, Daimon, and Ichiba began to flourish due to increased trade.

The Kako River continued to play an important role in ensuring the passage of people and goods until the Banshu Railway (now the Kakogawa Line) was constructed in 1913.

=== Flood control ===
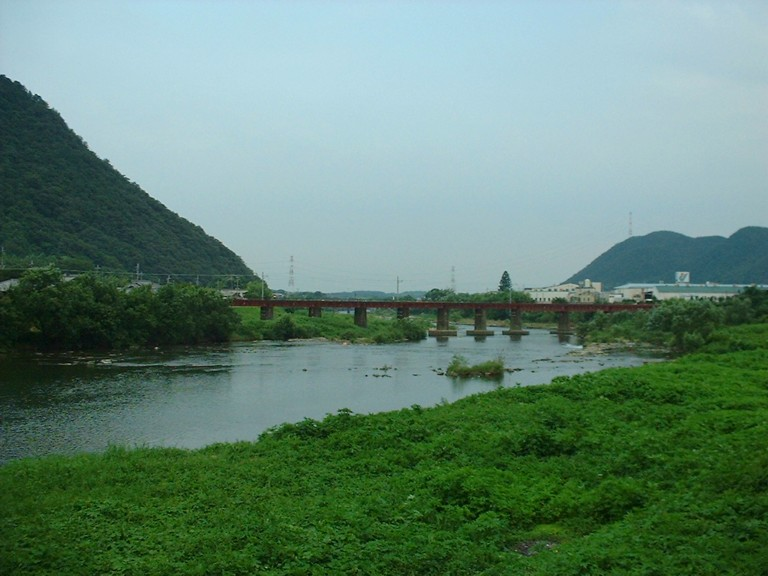
The Kako River flowing past Nishiwaki. A bridge on the Kakogawa Line can be seen in the background.

The flow of the Kako River has often changed due to large floods. The first known flood control measures were put in place by Sakakibara Tadatsugu, then lord of Himeji Castle, who ordered the construction of an embankment on the right bank of the river. This was done in order to make crossings easier, prevent flooding of downstream villages, and increasing available land for agriculture. Construction of the embankment lasted from 1658 to 1660, and is the foundation of the embankment that exists on the river today. Construction of the initial embankment required 600,000 people, and was completed in just one month. However, it was not successful in controlling flood damage, and repairing the embankments and providing relief to flood victims became an annual ritual for the local clan.

=== Modern history ===
Since the Meiji era, floods along the Kako River have been well-documented. The largest flood in the river's history was caused by the Akune Typhoon in 1945; over the two days the typhoon was active, the total rainfall was measured at 240.1 millimetres (9.45 in). Damage estimates counted 50 houses destroyed, 400 houses flooded, and 31 individuals killed or injured.

In 1920, an iron bridge was constructed across the river, made necessary as the previous bridges were repeatedly washed away by floods. The Kakogawa dam began construction on March 1, 1939, and was completed on May 1, 1945.

In order to develop post-war farmland and secure irrigation water for the purpose of increasing food production, construction of additional dams began in 1945. Industrial water supply projects began in 1952, with construction of the Heisho Dam beginning in the same year, and the Gongen Dam beginning in 1962. The rapid population increase in Kakogawa area led to increased difficulty in securing domestic water. Construction of the Kakogawa Dam began in 1981 in order to secure water for domestic purposes and to improve the safety of water use in the lower reaches of the Kako River.

With the implementation of the 1967 River Act, the Kako River was designated a Class A river system, deeming it important to the conservation of nature in Japan, and transferring control of the river to state management. Another flood occurred on September 28, 1983, caused by Typhoon Forrest. Total rainfall during the typhoon was 225.1 millimetres (8.86 in). In 1994 and 2000, the Kako River experienced droughts. During the drought in 1994, water intake was restricted by up to 40% for tap water and industrial water for around one and a half months. Further droughts also occurred in 2005, 2009, and 2013. Following the Great Hanshin earthquake in 1995, roads on the riverside were improved as to ensure the passage of relief and recovery vehicles in the event of a disaster.

=== Typhoon Tokage ===
On October 20, 2004, Typhoon Tokage struck, bringing a rainfall of 216.7 millimetres (8.53 in) for the two days the typhoon was active. The water level rose to a maximum of 8.16 metres (26.8 ft), the highest ever recorded in the river. An estimated 537 hectares (1,330 acres) of land was flooded, and 516 houses were damaged, and one person died. After this, the Kako River was improved to prevent similar damage from occurring in the future. In May 2000, the Kako River Disaster Prevention Station was established to protect lives and property from floods and earthquakes. It functions as a temporary evacuation site during disasters, and is open to the public for experiencing disaster simulations during normal times.

== Tourism and recreation ==
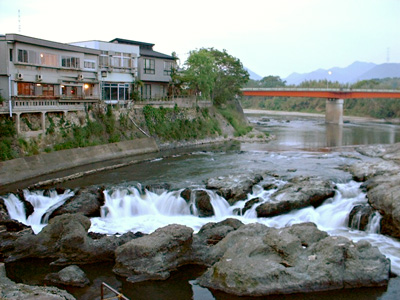
Tōryū-nada viewed from the south.

Tōryū-nada (闘竜灘) is a tourist spot in the Kako River. It is a collection of rocks sitting in the middle of the river; it is said that the appearance of the stream running over the rocks resembles a dragon. Originally the site was known as Sōryūtan (双龍灘), but it was renamed to Tōryū-nada after the Edo period poet Yanagawa Seigan composed a quatrain of the same name.

The area surrounding Tōryū-nada is also famous for its ayu sweetfish. After the opening of the fishing season on May 1, there is Ayu Festival held on May 3 each year. A method of catching ayu, known as Kakei-dori (筧どり) is practiced here.

The area surrounding the Kakogawa Weir is a popular site for canoeing and regattas, with local teams competing every year. The Kakogawa Marathon is held along the banks of the river annually.

== Ecology ==
Every year since 1991, a survey on the Kako River's ecosystem has been conducted by the Ministry of Land, Infrastructure, Transport and Tourism. According to a 2003 survey, 620 aquatic plant species in 112 families were present in the river. 57 species of fish and 264 species of benthic fauna have been identified in the Kako River system. It has the highest number of species of any river flowing into the Seto Inland Sea in Hyōgo Prefecture. Because the stream gradient is small, fish that prefer gentle flow (bitterlings, medaka, freshwater mussel etc.) are distributed all the way to the upper reaches. The number of invasive species is particularly large in the downstream areas of the river system.
