= Ichikawa =

Ichikawa may refer to:

== Places in Japan ==
- Ichikawa, Chiba, a city
  - Ichikawa Gakuen (Ichikawa Junior and Senior High School), a school in Ichikawa, Chiba
- Ichikawa, Hyōgo, a town
- Ichikawamisato, also known as Ichikawa, a city in Yamanashi
- Ichi River, a river in Hyōgo Prefecture

== Other uses ==
- Ichikawa (surname)
