= Tahara Station =

Railway station in Kasai, Hyōgo Prefecture, Japan

Tahara Station 田原駅
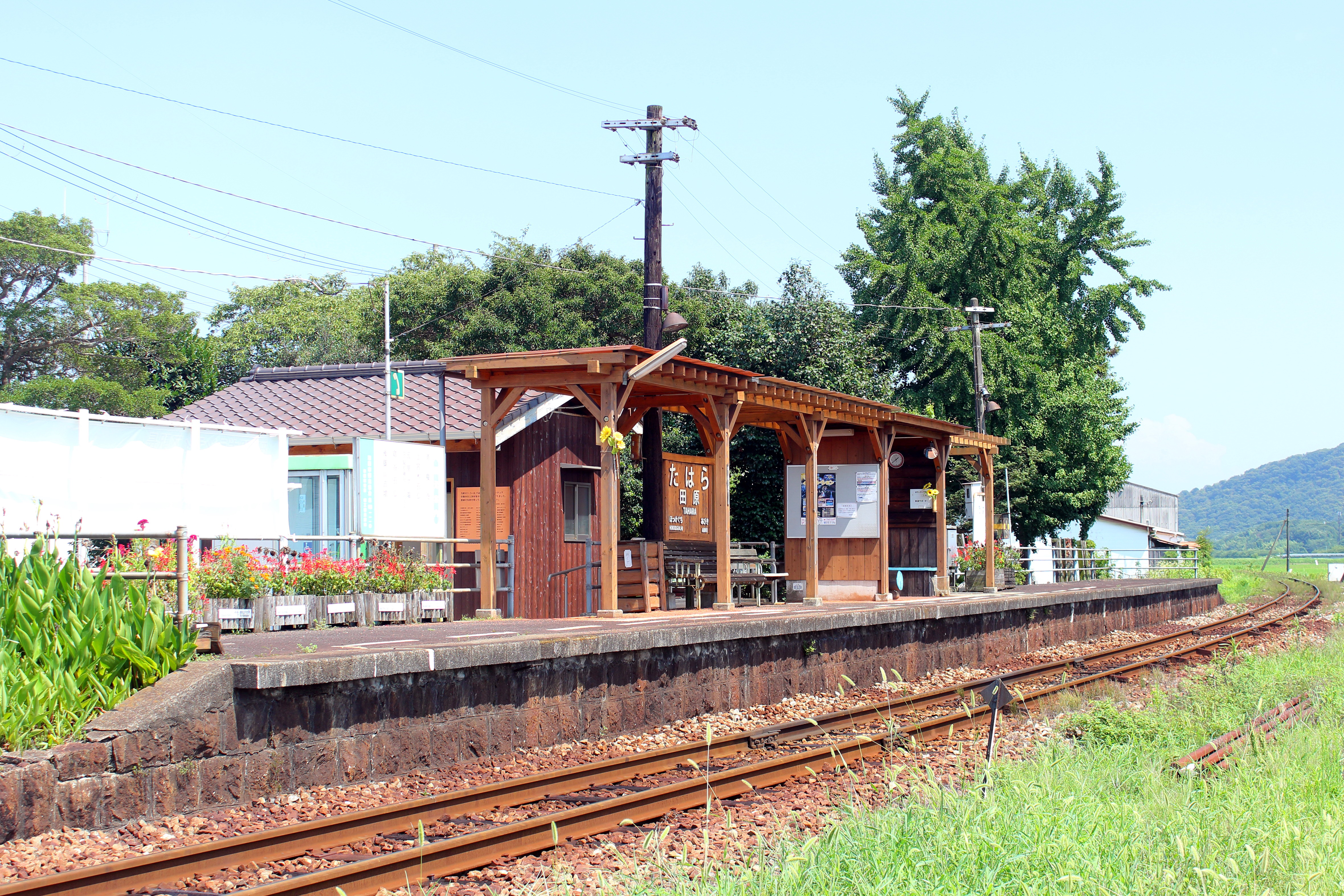
- Tahara Station in August 2017

General information
- Location: Taharacho, Kasai-shi, Hyogo-ken 675-2114; Japan
- Coordinates: 34.8655°N 134.8667°E
- Operator: Hōjō Railway
- Line: ■ Hōjō Line
- Distance: 4.6 km from Ao
- Platforms: 1 side platform

Other information
- Status: Unstaffed
- Website: Official website

History
- Opened: 12 December 1919

Passengers
- FY2018: 66 daily
Location
- Location within Hyōgo Prefecture Location within Japan

Tahara Station (田原駅, Tahara-eki) is a passenger railway station located in the city of Kasai, Hyōgo Prefecture, Japan, operated by the third-sector Hōjō Railway Company.

== Lines ==
Tahara Station is served by the Hōjō Line and is 4.6 kilometers from the terminus of the line at Ao Station.

== Station layout ==
The station consists of one side platform serving a single bi-directional track. The station is unattended.

== Adjacent stations ==
«	Service	»
Hōjō Line
Abiki	-	Hokkeguchi

== History ==
Tahara Station opened on December 12, 1919. The current station building was completed in July 2010.

== Passenger statistics ==
In fiscal 2018, the station was used by an average of 66 passengers daily.

== Surrounding area ==
- Motoyama Kofun, Prefectural Historic Site.

== See also ==
- List of railway stations in Japan
