= Tamaoka Kofun Cluster =

Kofun period burial mound cluster in Kasai, Japan

Tamaoka Kofun cluster
- 玉丘古墳群 (Japanese)
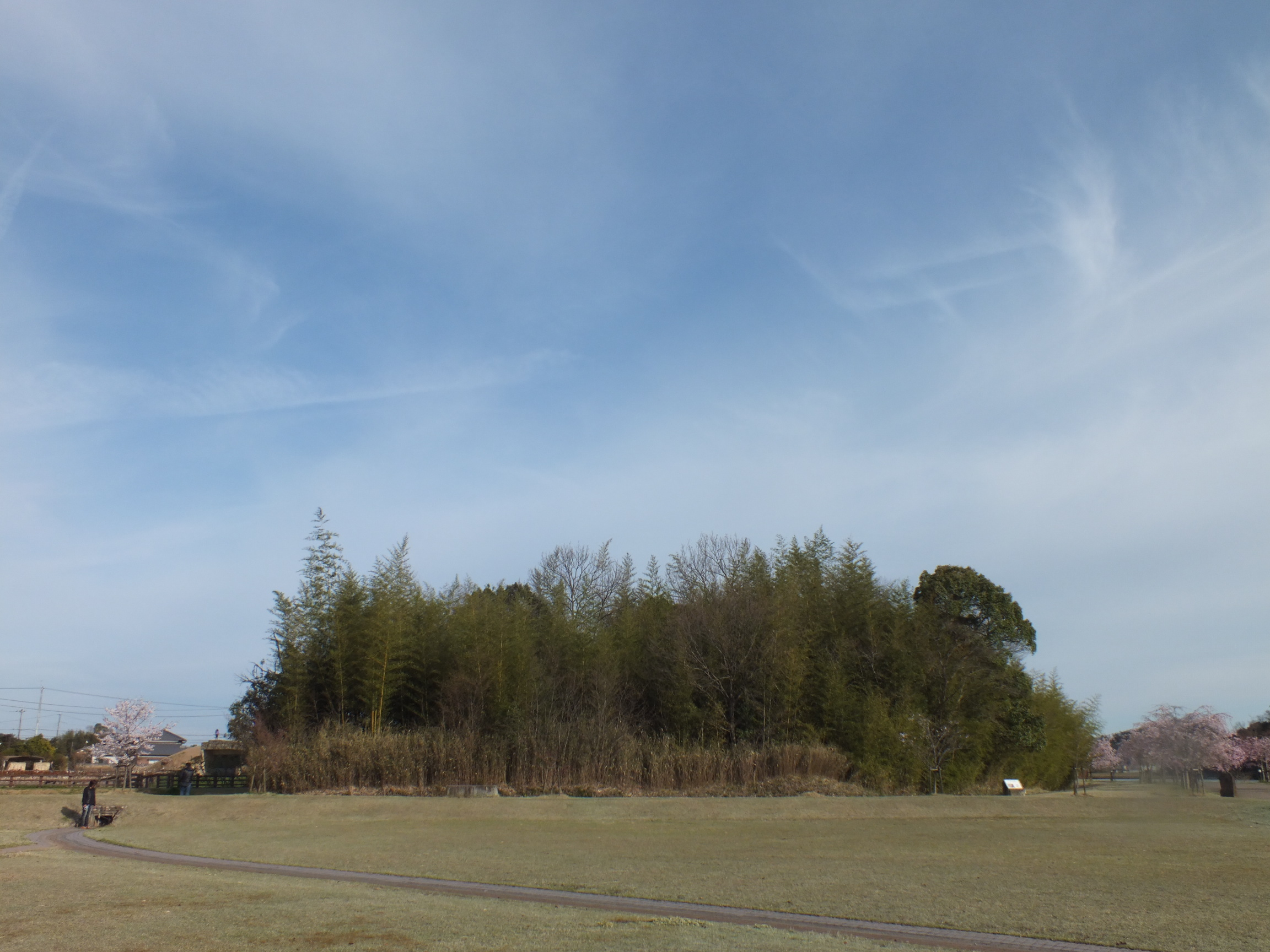
- Tamaoka Kofun

- Tamaoka Kofun cluster Tamaoka Kofun Cluster (Japan)
- Interactive map of Tamaoka Kofun cluster
- 34°55′14″N 134°50′59.6″E
- Type: Kofun
- Periods: Kofun period
- Location: Kasai, Hyōgo, Japan
- Region: Kansai region

History
- Built: late 4th - mid-5th century AD

Site notes
- Public access: Yes (park)

The Tamaoka Kofun cluster (玉丘古墳群) is a group of seven kofun burial mounds located in the Shinya, Tamaoka and Tamano neighborhoods of the city of Kaisai, Hyōgo Prefecture, in the Kansai region of Japan. The Tamaoka Kofun was individually designated a National Historic Site in 1943, with the others added in 1978 and the area under protection expanded in 1997.

== Overview ==
The Tamaoka Kofun cluster is located on a long terrace extending on the east bank of the Kakogawa River. The cluster shows a wide variety of styles, and once consisted of over 30 tumuli in the surrounding area, most of which were destroyed due to the development of residential land.

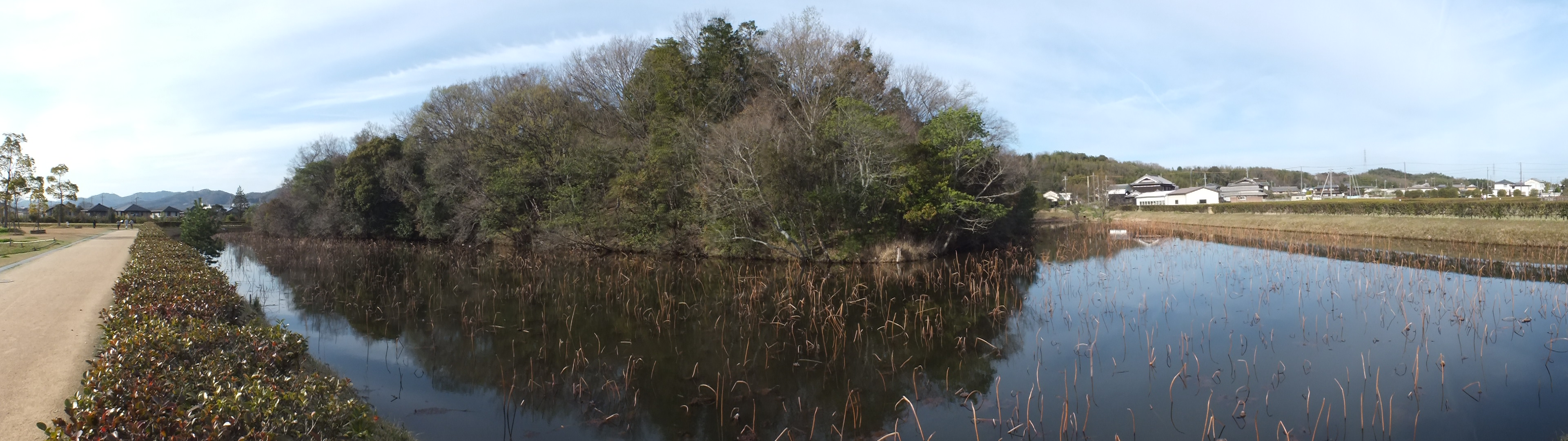
Kasai Tamaoka Historic Park

=== Tamaoka Kofun (玉丘古墳) ===
The Tamaoka Kofun is a zenpō-kōen-fun (前方後円墳), which is shaped like a keyhole, having one square end and one circular end, when viewed from above. It dates from the middle of the Kofun period, and has a total length of about 109 meters, with an anterior width of about 54 meters, and a posterior circular diameter of about 64 meters, making it the fifth largest in Hyogo Prefecture. The tumulus was consisted in three tiers and was encircled by a moat with a width of about 20 meters. Fukiishi and many cylindrical and figurative haniwa were used, based on the excavated relics. The burial chamber has been robbed in antiquity, with a hole in the center of the posterior portion still existent, and the remains of a tuff sarcophagus can be seen. The tumulus os the stage for a tragic love story involving Nichijō-hime, as recounted in the local history "Harima Kokudoki".

=== Baizuka No.1 and No.2 Kofun (陪塚第1号墳・第2号墳) ===
The Baizuka No.1 and No.2 Kofun are secondary tumuli flanking the Tamaoka Kofun to the east and west. Baizuka No.1 is a circular enpun (円墳) tumulus with diameter of 25 meters, but has been severely modified and may have originally been a keyhole-shaped tumulus. Haniwa and Fukiishi fragments have been found in its surrounding moat. Baizuka No.2 is a square hofun (方墳) tumulus with a side length of 24 meters. Both tumuli date from the middle of the Kofun period.

=== Dantōzuka Kofun (壇塔山古墳) ===
The Dantōzuka Kofun is a circular enpun (円墳) tumulus with diameter of 17 meters, surrounded by a three-meter wide moat. It is located 110 meters to the southeast of the Tamaoka Kofun. Fragments of cylindrical haniwa have been recovered from the moat. The horizontal hole type stone burial chamber opens toward the south. However, most of the stone materials used, including the ceiling of the stone chamber, have been removed. The tumulus dates from the middle of the Kofun period (early 5th century).

=== Kuwanzuka Kofun (クワンス古墳) ===
The Kuwanzuka Kofun is a circular enpun (円墳) tumulus with diameter of 35 meters, constructed in two tiers on a square embankment. Cylindrical and figurative haniwa have been found. At the top of the burial mound was a pit-type stone burial chamber. It thought to have housed a split bamboo-shaped wooden coffin, but it is probable that many of the stones were removed and most of the burial goods were robbed in antiquity. Surviving grave goods included fragments of iron swords, armor and agricultural tools, as well as earthenware shards. The tumulus's located 170 meters west of the Tamaoka Kofun.

=== Shinozuka Kofun (笹塚古墳) ===
The Shinozuka Kofun is a keyhole-shaped tumulus dang from the late Kofun period. It has a total length of 51 meters, with an anterior width of 16 meters, posterior diameter of 43 meters and is orientated to the east. At the top of the posterior circular portion, the pit-type stone burial chamber is exposed. Traces of a moat with a width of 10 meters remain, and both figurative and cylindrical haniwa have been recovered.

=== Aizen Kofun (愛染古墳) ===
The Aizen Kofun is a reconstruction of a circular empun tumulus with a diameter of 18 meters, containing a side-hole style burial chamber, with sarcophagus and fragments of Sue ware pottery. It was located at the Azajoten-ji temple in the Satani neighborhood of Kasai, but was relocated to this location.

The site is open to the public as an archaeological park, and is located about a 20-minute walk from Hōjōmachi Station on the Hojo Railway Hōjō Line.

== See also ==
- List of Historic Sites of Japan (Hyōgo)
