= Osa Station =

Railway station in Kasai, Hyōgo Prefecture, Japan

Osa Station 長駅
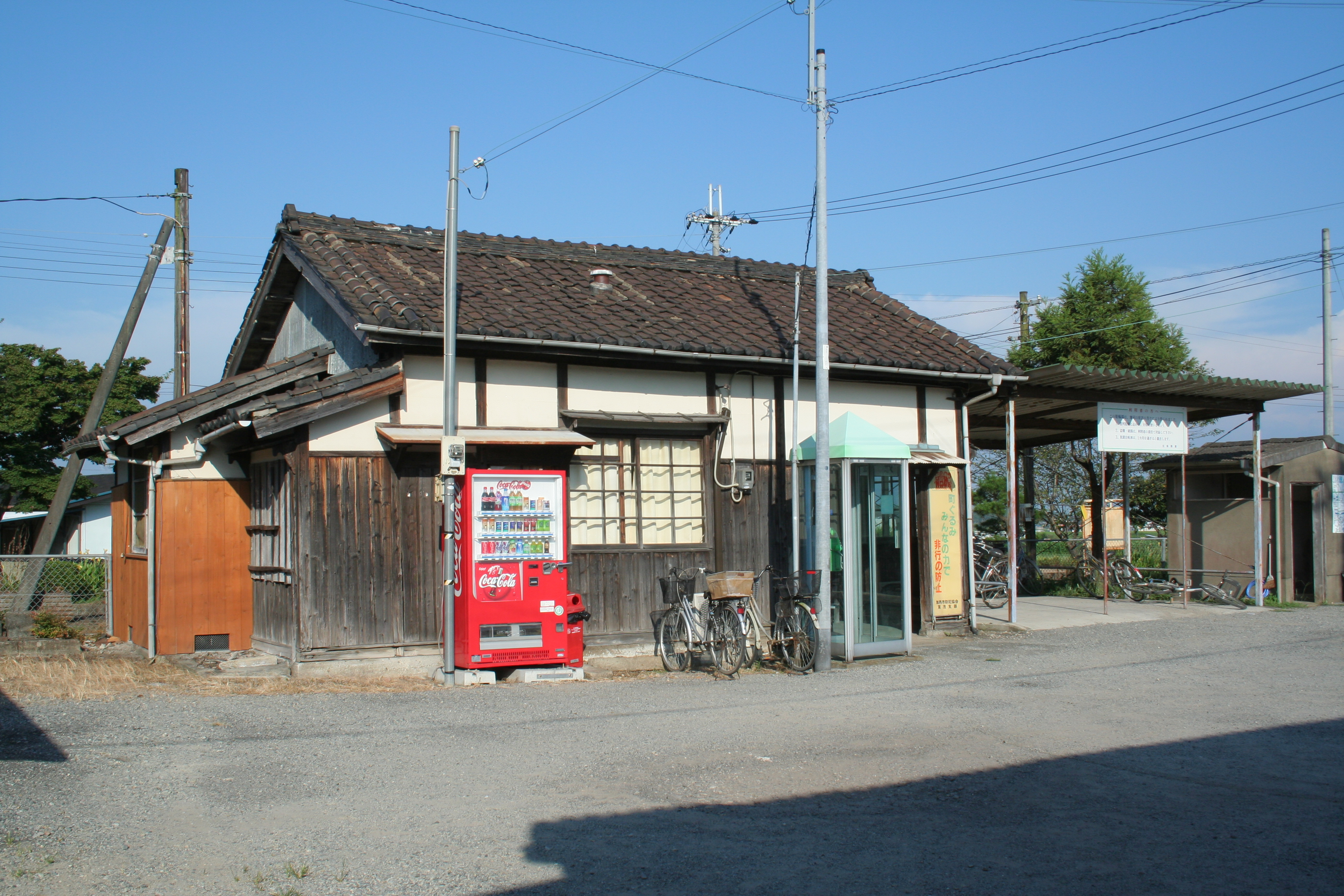
- Osa Station in August 2010

General information
- Location: Nishiosa-cho, Kasai-shi, Hyogo-ken 675-2342; Japan
- Coordinates: 34.8965°N 134.8255°E
- Operator: Hōjō Railway
- Line: ■ Hōjō Line
- Distance: 9.8 km from Ao
- Platforms: 1 side platform

Other information
- Status: Unstaffed
- Website: Official website

History
- Opened: 3 March 1915

Passengers
- FY2018: 35 daily
Location
- Location within Hyōgo Prefecture Location within Japan

Osa Station (長駅, Osa-eki) is a passenger railway station located in the city of Kasai, Hyōgo Prefecture, Japan, operated by the third-sector Hōjō Railway Company.

== Lines ==
Osa Station is served by the Hōjō Line and is 9.8 kilometers from the terminus of the line at Ao Station.

== Station layout ==
The station consists of one side platform serving a single bi-directional track. The station is unattended.

== Adjacent stations ==
«	Service	»
Hōjō Line
Harima-Shimosato	-	Harima-Yokota

== History ==
Osa Station opened on March 3, 1915. The station building and platform were registered by the national government as a National Registered Tangible Cultural Property in 2014.

== Passenger statistics ==
In fiscal 2018, the station was used by an average of 35 passengers daily.

== Surrounding area ==
- Shimosato River

== See also ==
- List of railway stations in Japan
