= Harima-Yokota Station =

Railway station in Kasai, Hyōgo Prefecture, Japan

Harima-Yokota Station 播磨横田駅
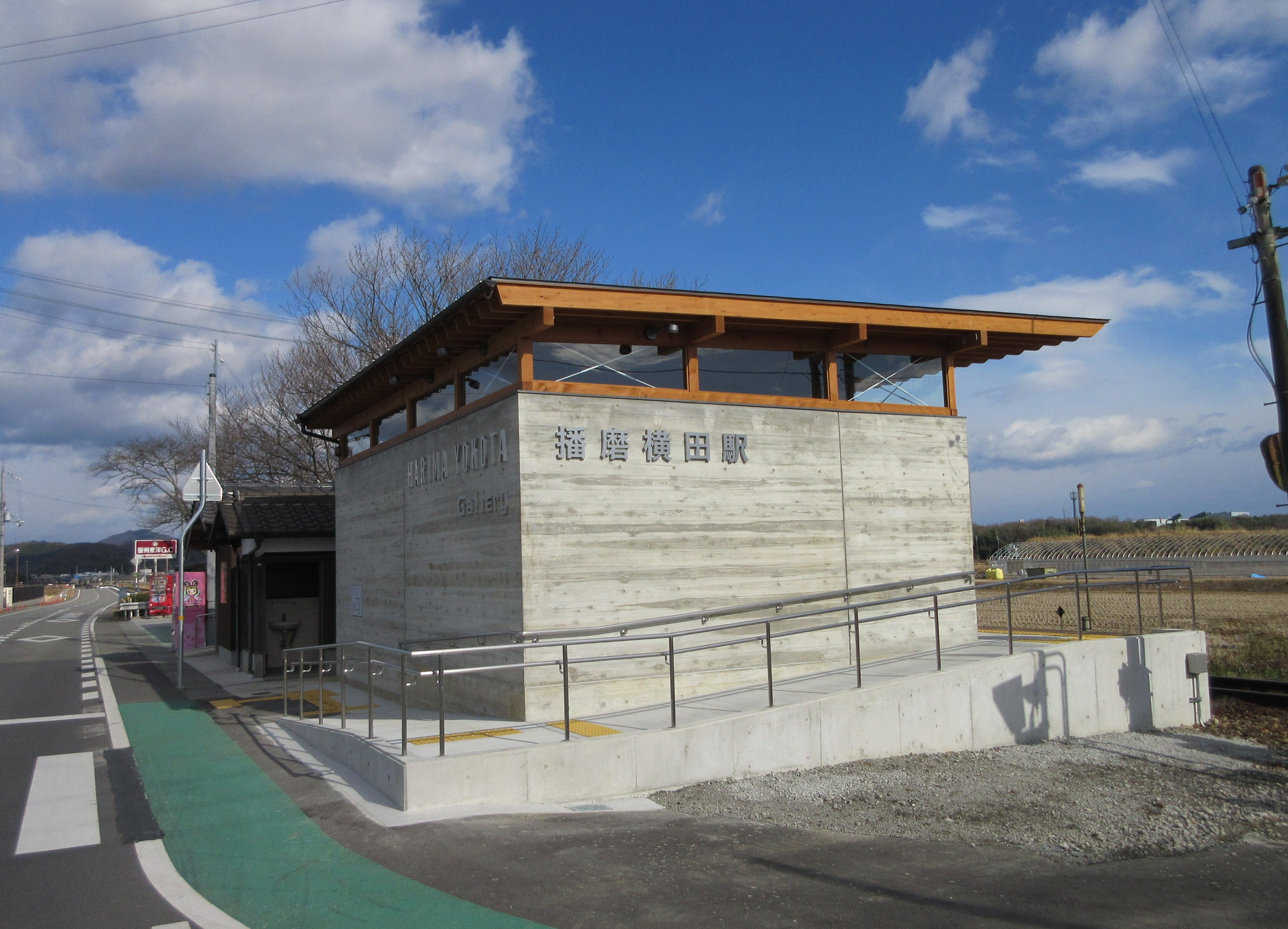
- Harima-Yokota Station in January 2015

General information
- Location: Nishiyokota-cho, Kasai-shi, Hyogo-ken 675-2335; Japan
- Coordinates: 34.9105°N 134.8251°E
- Operator: Hōjō Railway
- Line: ■ Hōjō Line
- Distance: 11.4 km from Ao
- Platforms: 1 side platform

Other information
- Status: Unstaffed
- Website: Official website

History
- Opened: 20 December 1961

Passengers
- FY2018: 54 daily
Location
- Location within Hyōgo Prefecture Location within Japan

Harima-Yokota Station (播磨横田駅, Harima-Yokota-eki) is a passenger railway station located in the city of Kasai, Hyōgo Prefecture, Japan, operated by the third-sector Hōjō Railway Company.

== Lines ==
Harima-Yokota Station is served by the Hōjō Line and is 11.4 kilometers from the terminus of the line at Ao Station.

== Station layout ==
The station consists of one side platform serving a single bi-directional track. The station is unattended.

== Adjacent stations ==
«	Service	»
Hōjō Line
Osa	-	Hōjōmachi

== History ==
Harima-Yokota Stationbegan as a provisional stop, the Yokotamura Teishajo (横田村停留場), on June 3, 1916. It ceased operations on May 9, 1921 and was abolished on April 5, 1934. A new provisional stop was constructed on the former location on October 1, 1961 and was elevated to a full passenger station on December 20, 1961. The current station building was completed in December 2014..

== Passenger statistics ==
In fiscal 2018, the station was used by an average of 54 passengers daily.

== Surrounding area ==
- Hyogo Prefectural Hojo High School
- Hyogo Prefectural Harima Agricultural High School

== See also ==
- List of railway stations in Japan
