= Abiki Station =

Railway station in Kasai, Hyōgo Prefecture, Japan

Abiki Station 網引駅
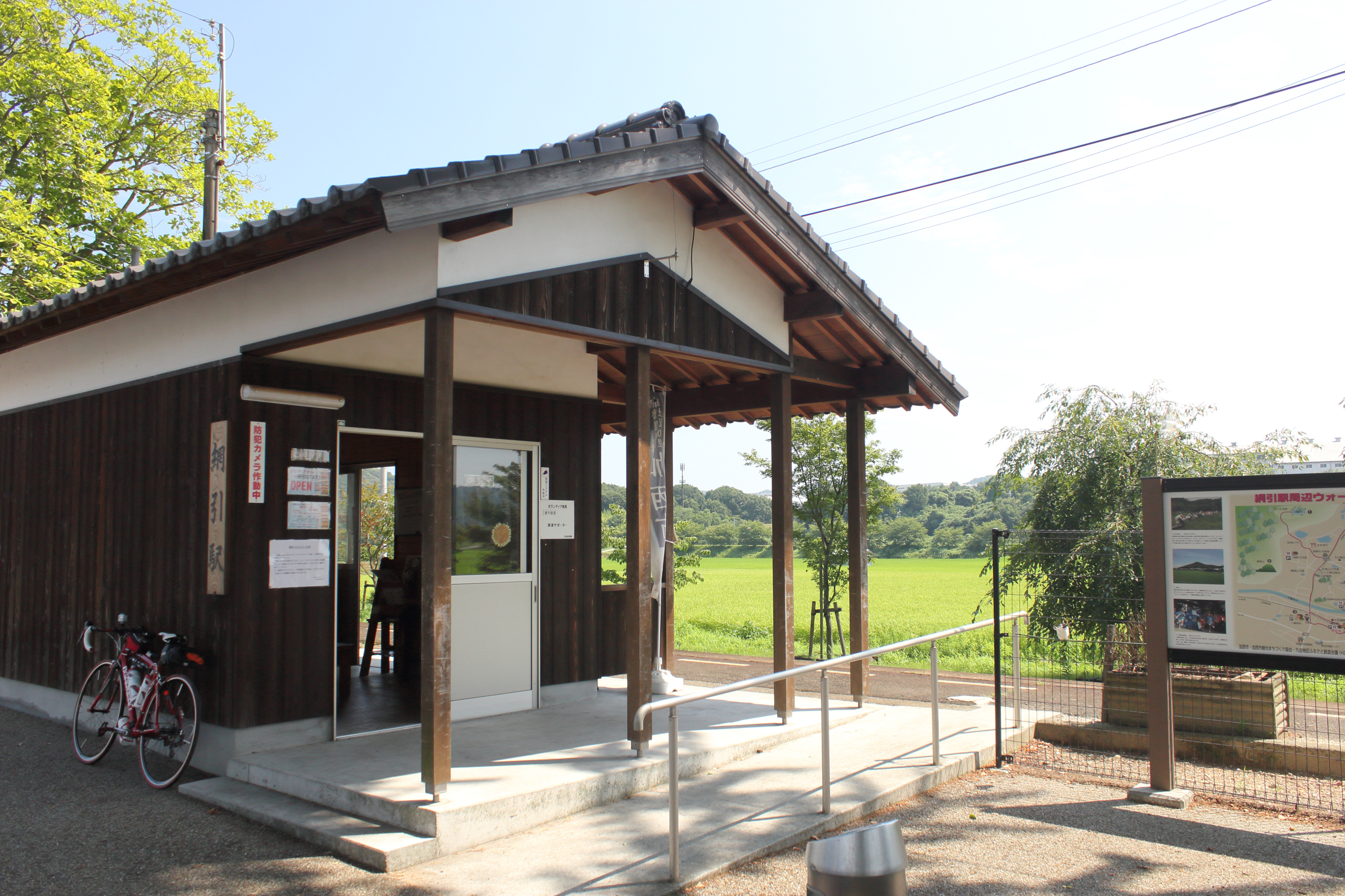
- Station building in August 2017

General information
- Location: Abikicho, Kasai-shi, Hyogo-ken 675-2113; Japan
- Coordinates: 34°51′43.72″N 134°52′40.4″E
- Operator: Hōjō Railway
- Line: ■ Hōjō Line
- Distance: 3.5 km from Ao
- Platforms: 1 side platform

Other information
- Status: Unstaffed
- Website: Official website

History
- Opened: 3 March 1915

Passengers
- FY2018: 55 daily
Location
- Location within Hyōgo Prefecture Location within Japan

Abiki Station (網引駅, Abiki-eki) is a passenger railway station located in the city of Kasai, Hyōgo Prefecture, Japan, operated by the third-sector Hōjō Railway Company.

== Lines ==
Abiki Station is served by the Hōjō Line and is 3.5 kilometers from the terminus of the line at Ao Station.

== Station layout ==
The station consists of one side platform serving a single bi-directional track. The station is unattended.

== Adjacent stations ==
| « | Service | » |
Hōjō Line
| Ao | - | Tahara |

== History ==
Abiki Station opened on March 3, 1915. The station building was destroyed in June 1984 in an act of arson. The current station building was completed in February 2013.

== Passenger statistics ==
In fiscal 2018, the station was used by an average of 55 passengers daily.

== Surrounding area ==
- Kasai Minami Industrial Park.

== See also ==
- List of railway stations in Japan
