= Mount Fujinashi =

Mountain in Japan

Coordinates: 35°16′00″N 134°36′02″E

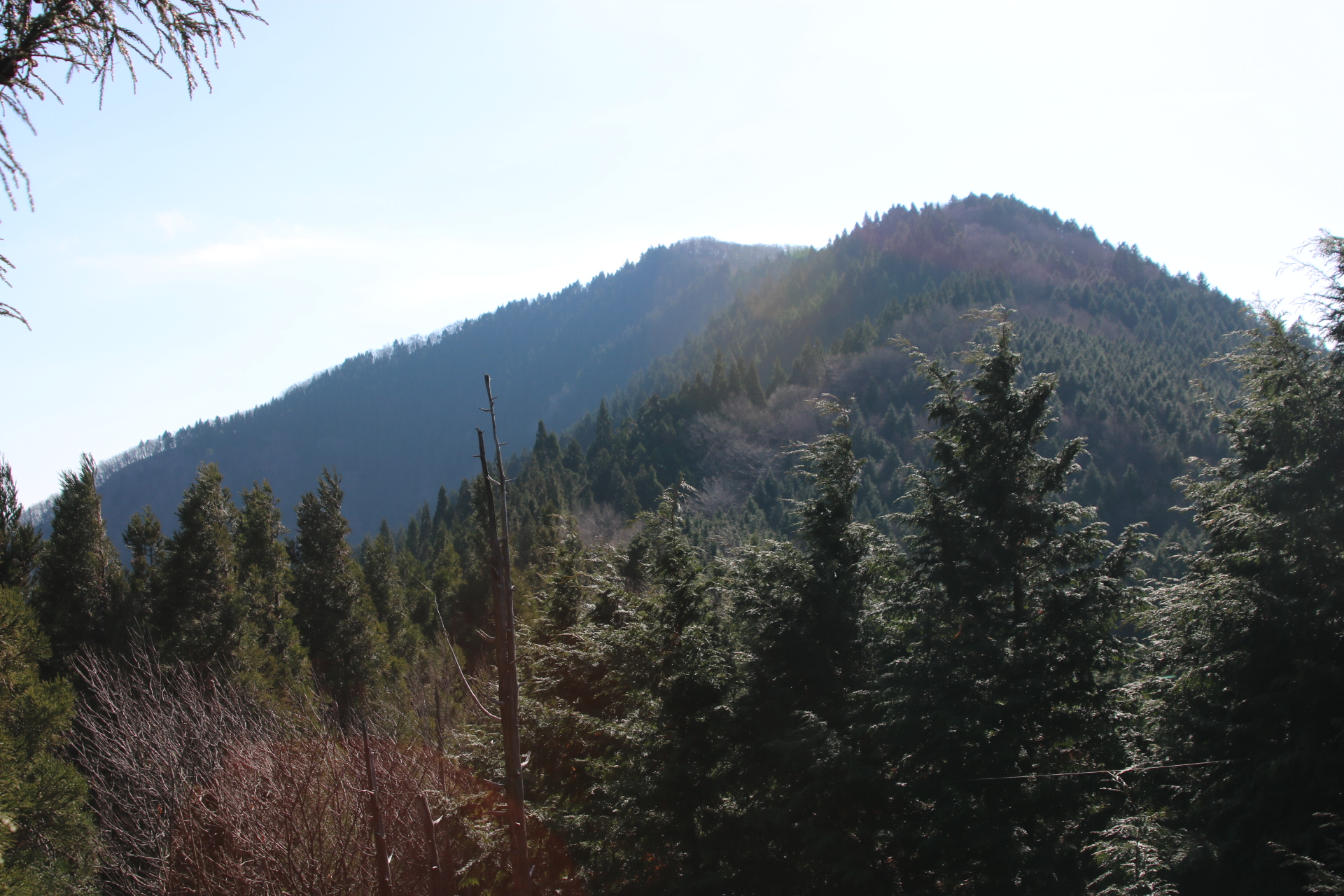

Highest point
- Elevation: 1,139 m (3,737 ft)

Naming
- Native name: 藤無山 (Japanese)

Geography
- Location: Hyogo Prefecture, Japan

Mount Fujinashi (藤無山, Fujinashiyama) is a mountain in Hyōgo Prefecture, Japan. It stands at a height of 1,139 m (3,737 ft). The source of the Ibo River is located on the south side of the mountain.
