= Hokkeguchi Station =

Railway station in Kasai, Hyōgo Prefecture, Japan

Hokkeguchi Station 法華口駅
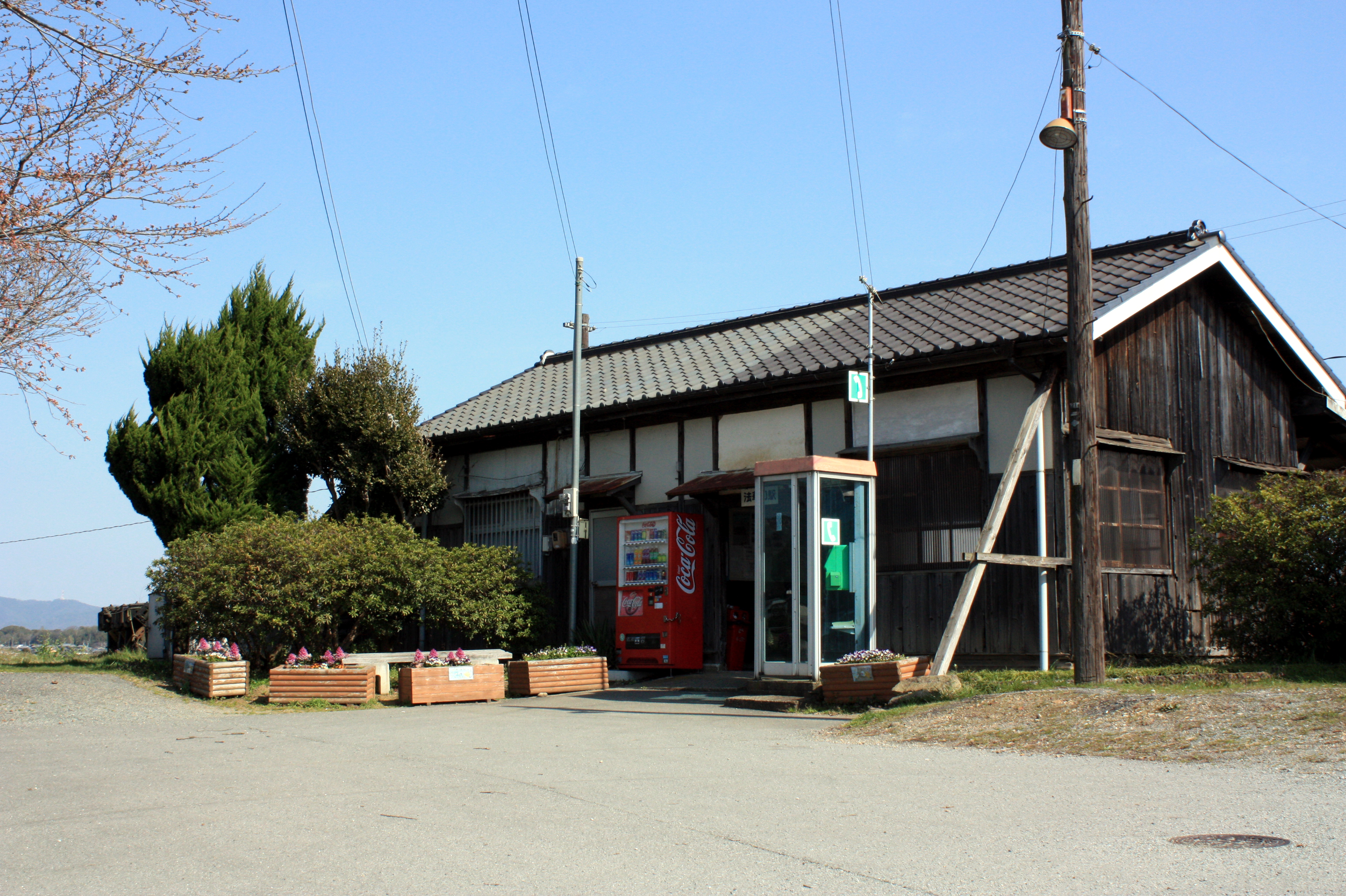
- Hokkeguchi Station in March 2010

General information
- Location: Higashikasaharacho, Kasai-shi, Hyogo-ken 675-2212; Japan
- Coordinates: 34.8750°N 134.8564°E
- Operator: Hōjō Railway
- Line: ■ Hōjō Line
- Distance: 6.1 km from Ao
- Platforms: 2 side platforms

Other information
- Status: Unstaffed
- Website: Official website

History
- Opened: 3 March 1915

Passengers
- FY2018: 78 daily
Location
- Location within Hyōgo Prefecture Location within Japan

Hokkeguchi Station (法華口駅, Hokkeguchi-eki) is a passenger railway station located in the city of Kasai, Hyōgo Prefecture, Japan, operated by the third-sector Hōjō Railway Company.

== Lines ==
Hokkeguchi Station is served by the Hōjō Line and is 6.1 kilometers from the terminus of the line at Ao Station.

== Station layout ==
The station consists of two opposed side platforms connected by a level crossing. The station is unattended.

== Adjacent stations ==
«	Service	»
Hōjō Line
Tahara	-	Harima-Shimosato

== History ==
Hokkeguchi Station opened on March 3, 1915. The station building and platform were registered by the national government as a National Registered Tangible Cultural Property in 2014. The outhouse toilet of the station also received protection as a Registered Tangible Cultural Property at the same time.

== Passenger statistics ==
In fiscal 2018, the station was used by an average of 78 passengers daily.

== Surrounding area ==
- Ichijo-ji Temple (Saigoku Kannon Pilgrimage Temple No. 26)
- Center for Food Resources Education and Research, Graduate School of Agriculture, Kobe University

== See also ==
- List of railway stations in Japan
