= Harima-Shimosato Station =

Railway station in Kasai, Hyōgo Prefecture, Japan

Harima-Shimosato Station 播磨下里駅
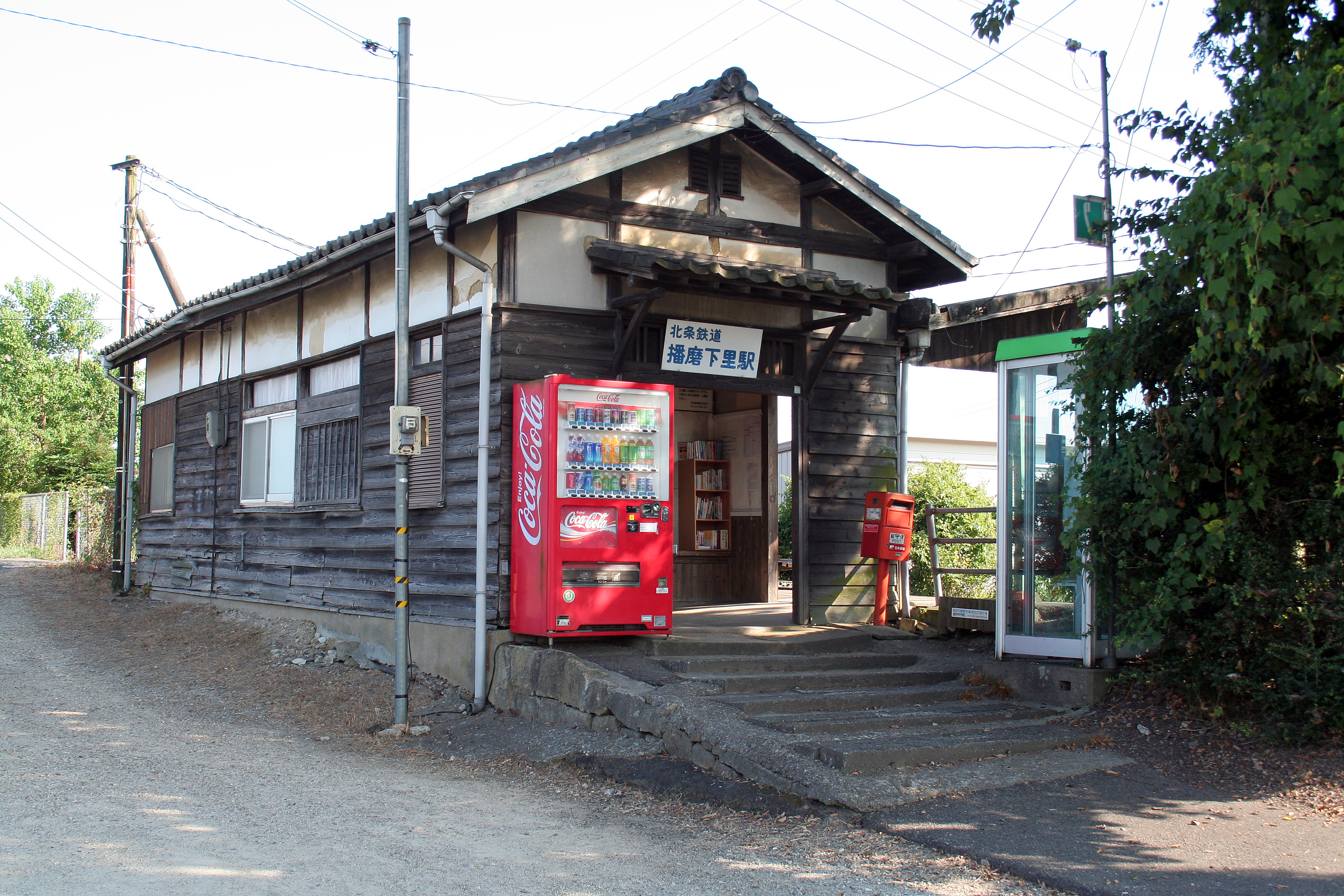
- Harima-Shimosato Station in August 2010

General information
- Location: Ōji-chō, Kasai-shi, Hyōgo-ken 675-2231; Japan
- Coordinates: 34.8863°N 134.8401°E
- Operator: Hōjō Railway
- Line: ■ Hōjō Line
- Distance: 8.0 km from Ao
- Platforms: 1 side platform

Other information
- Status: Unstaffed
- Website: Official website

History
- Opened: 14 August 1917
- Former names: Harima-Ōji (to 1943)

Passengers
- FY2018: 87 daily
Location
- Location within Hyōgo Prefecture Location within Japan

Harima-Shimosato Station (播磨下里駅, Harima-Shimosato-eki) is a passenger railway station located in the city of Kasai, Hyōgo Prefecture, Japan, operated by the third-sector Hōjō Railway Company.

== Lines ==
Harima-Shimosato Station is served by the Hōjō Line and is 8.0 kilometers from the terminus of the line at Ao Station.

== Station layout ==
The station consists of oneside platform serving a single bi-directional track. The station is unattended.

== Adjacent stations ==
«	Service	»
Hōjō Line
Hokkeguchi	-	Osa

== History ==
Harima-Shimosato Station opened on August 14, 1917 as Harima-Ōji Station (播鉄王子駅). It was renamed to its present name on June 1, 1943. The station building and platform were registered by the national government as a National Registered Tangible Cultural Property in 2014.

== Passenger statistics ==
In fiscal 2018, the station was used by an average of 87 passengers daily.

== Surrounding area ==
- Furuhokkeji Nature Park
- Shimosato River
- Kasai City Zenbo Junior High School
- Kasai Municipal Shimosato Elementary School

== See also ==
- List of railway stations in Japan
