= Hōjōmachi Station =

Railway station in Kasai, Hyōgo Prefecture, Japan

Hōjōmachi Station 北条町駅
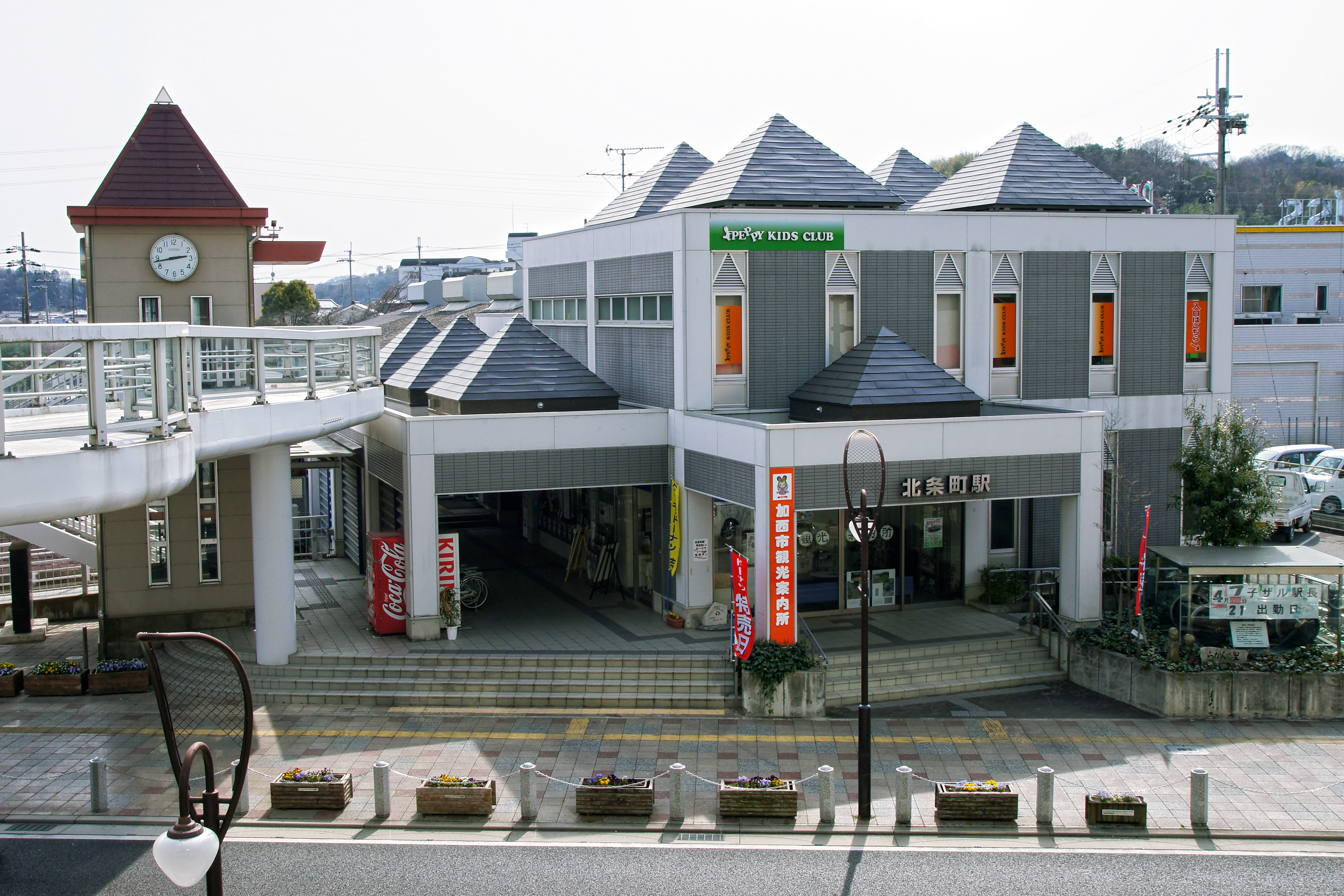
- Hōjōmachi Station in March 2013

General information
- Location: 28-2 Hojocho, Kasai-shi, Hyogo-ken 675-2312; Japan
- Coordinates: 34.9301°N 134.8321°E
- Operator: Hōjō Railway
- Line: ■ Hōjō Line
- Distance: 13.4 km from Ao
- Platforms: 1 side platform

Other information
- Status: Staffed
- Website: Official website

History
- Opened: 3 March 1915

Passengers
- FY2018: 524 daily
Location
- Location within Hyōgo Prefecture Location within Japan

Hōjōmachi Station (北条町駅, Hōjōmachi-eki) is a passenger railway station located in the city of Kasai, Hyōgo Prefecture, Japan, operated by the third-sector Hōjō Railway Company.

== Lines ==
Hōjōmachi Station is a terminus of the Hōjō Line and is 13.4 kilometers from the opposing terminus of the line at Ao Station.

== Station layout ==
The station consists of one dead-headed side platform. The station is staffed.

== Adjacent stations ==
«	Service	»
Hōjō Line
Harima-Yokota	-	Terminus

== History ==
Hōjōmachi Station opened on March 3, 1915. The current station building as completed in 2011 at a location 100 meters from its original site.

== Passenger statistics ==
In fiscal 2018, the station was used by an average of 524 passengers daily.

== Surrounding area ==
- Tamaoka Kofun cluster
- Rakan-ji
- Sumiyoshi Jinja
- Kasai City Hall

== See also ==
- List of railway stations in Japan
