= Hōjō Line =

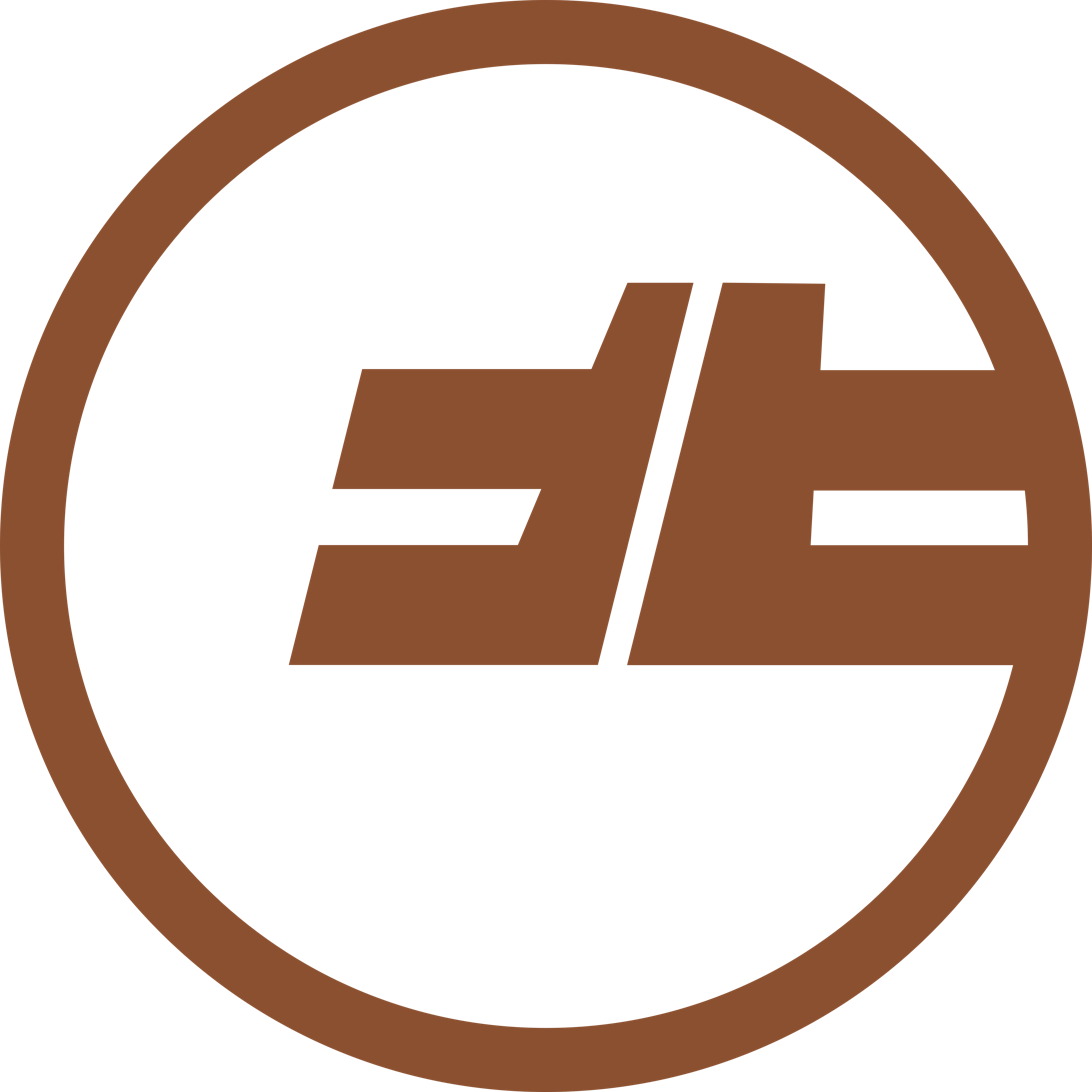

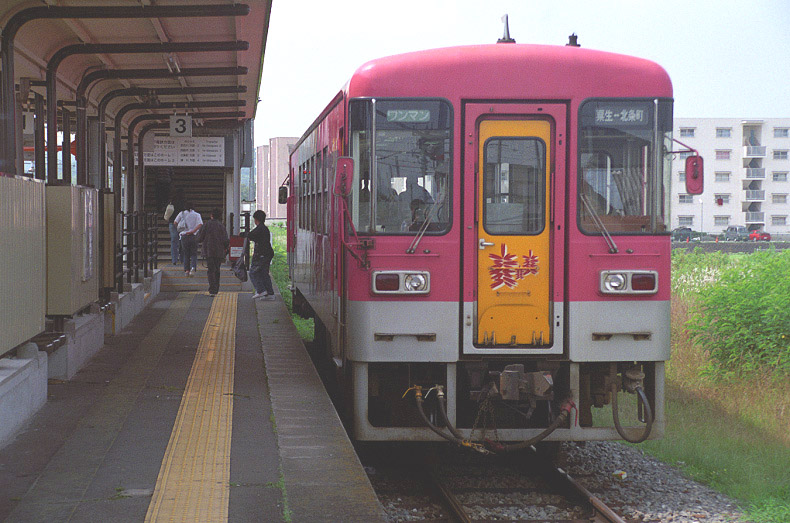
- Furawa 2000 Series train at Ao Station

Overview
- Native name: 北条線
- Status: In operation
- Owner: Hojo Railway Company
- Locale: Hyōgo Prefecture
- Termini: Ao; Hōjōmachi
- Stations: 8

Service
- Type: Heavy rail
- Operator: Hojo Railway Company
- Rolling stock: Flower 2000 series DMU, KiHa 40 series DMU

History
- Opened: 1915

Technical
- Line length: 13.6 km (8.5 mi)
- Number of tracks: Entire line single tracked
- Character: Rural
- Track gauge: 1,067 mm (3 ft 6 in)
- Electrification: None
- Operating speed: 65 km/h (40 mph)

The Hōjō Line (北条線, Hōjō-sen) is a Japanese railway line in Hyōgo Prefecture, running between Ao Station in Ono and Hōjōmachi Station in Kasai. It is the only railway line operated by Hojo Railway Company (北条鉄道株式会社, Hōjō Tetsudō Kabushiki-gaisha), a third-sector railway company which took over the former Japanese National Railways line in 1985. The line links Hōjō, a central town of Kasai, and two railway lines, namely JR West's Kakogawa Line and Kobe Electric Railway's Ao Line.

== Basic data ==
- Distance: 13.6 km / 8.5 mi.
- Gauge: 1,067 mm / 3 ft. 6 in.
- Stations: 8
- Double-track line: None
- Electric supply: Not electrified
- Railway signalling: Staff token

== History ==
Banshū Railway (播州鉄道, Banshū Tetsudō) opened the line in 1915. The railway was acquired by Bantan Railway (播丹鉄道, Bantan Tetsudō) in 1923 and nationalised in 1943 together with other Bantan Railway lines, namely the Kakogawa Line, the Takasago Line, the Miki Line, and the Kajiya Line.

Freight services ceased in 1974. Hojo Railway Company commenced operating the line in 1985.

=== Accidents ===
On 31 March 1945, a Kawanishi N1K fighter on a test flight made an emergency landing near Abiki that damaged the line resulting in a derailment that killed 11 and injured 104 passengers.

== Stations ==
Station name	in Japanese	Distance (km)	Connecting lines	Location	
Ao	粟生	0.0	JR West: Kakogawa Line; Kobe Electric Railway: Ao Line	Ono	Hyōgo
Abiki	網引	3.5		Kasai	Hyōgo
Tahara	田原	4.6		Kasai	Hyōgo
Hokkeguchi	法華口	6.1		Kasai	Hyōgo
Harima-Shimosato	播磨下里	8.0		Kasai	Hyōgo
Osa	長	9.8		Kasai	Hyōgo
Harima-Yokota	播磨横田	11.4		Kasai	Hyōgo
Hōjōmachi	北条町	13.6		Kasai	Hyōgo

== See also ==
- List of railway companies in Japan
- List of railway lines in Japan
