= Kasai, Hyōgo =

Kasai 加西市
- City
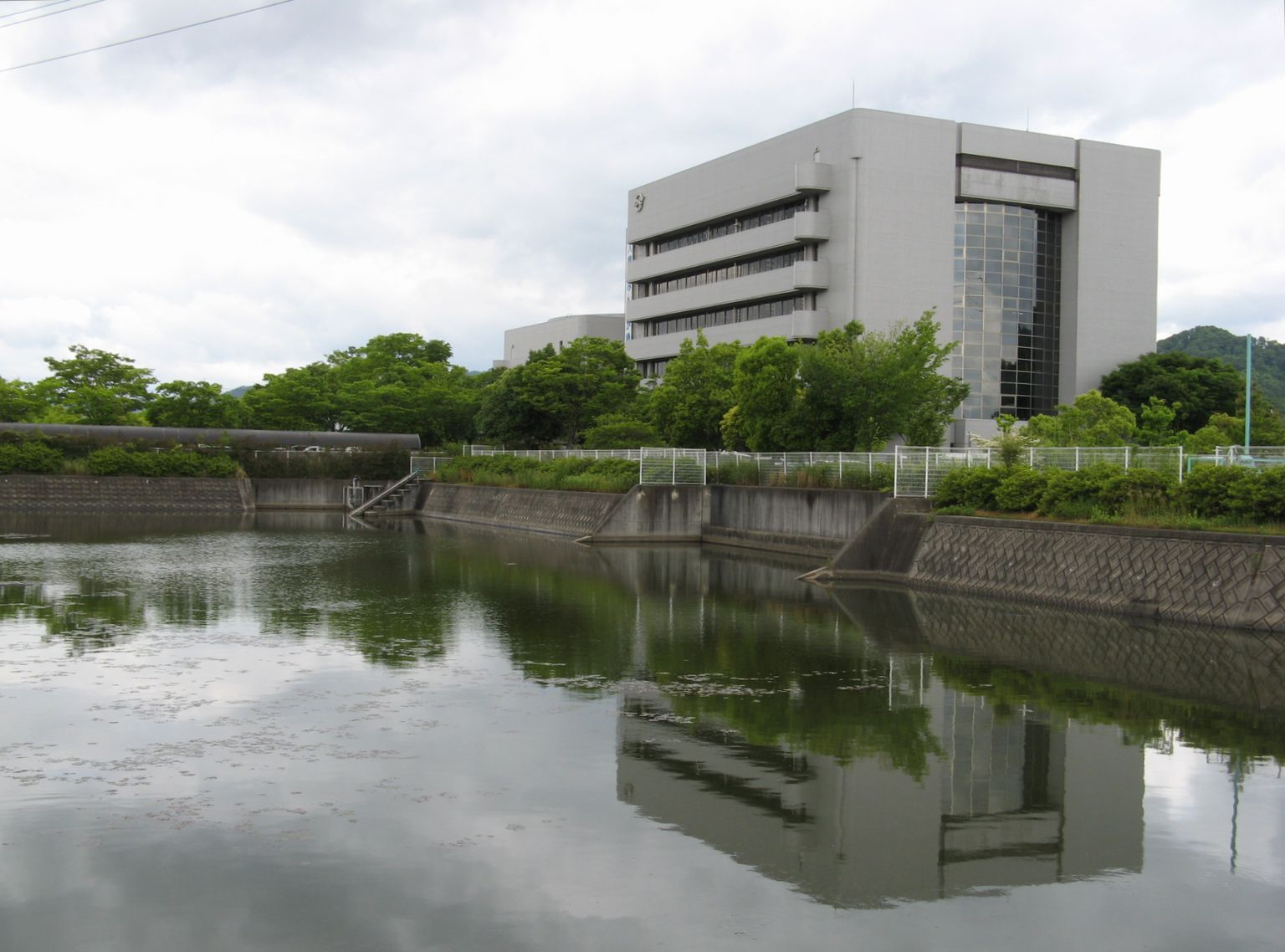
- Kasai City Hall

- Flag Emblem
- Interactive map of Kasai
- Location in Japan
- Coordinates: 34°56′N 134°50′E
- Country: Japan
- Region: Kansai
- Prefecture: Hyōgo

Government
  - Mayor: Kazuhira Nishimura (since June 2011)

Area
  - Total: 150.98 km^{2} (58.29 sq mi)

Population (April 30, 2022)
  - Total: 42,494
  - Density: 281.45/km^{2} (728.96/sq mi)
- Time zone: UTC+09:00 (JST)
- City hall address: 1000 Yokoo, Hōjō-chō, Kasai-shi, Hyōgo-ken 675-2395
- Website: Official website
- Symbols
- Flower: Salvia
- Tree: Live oak

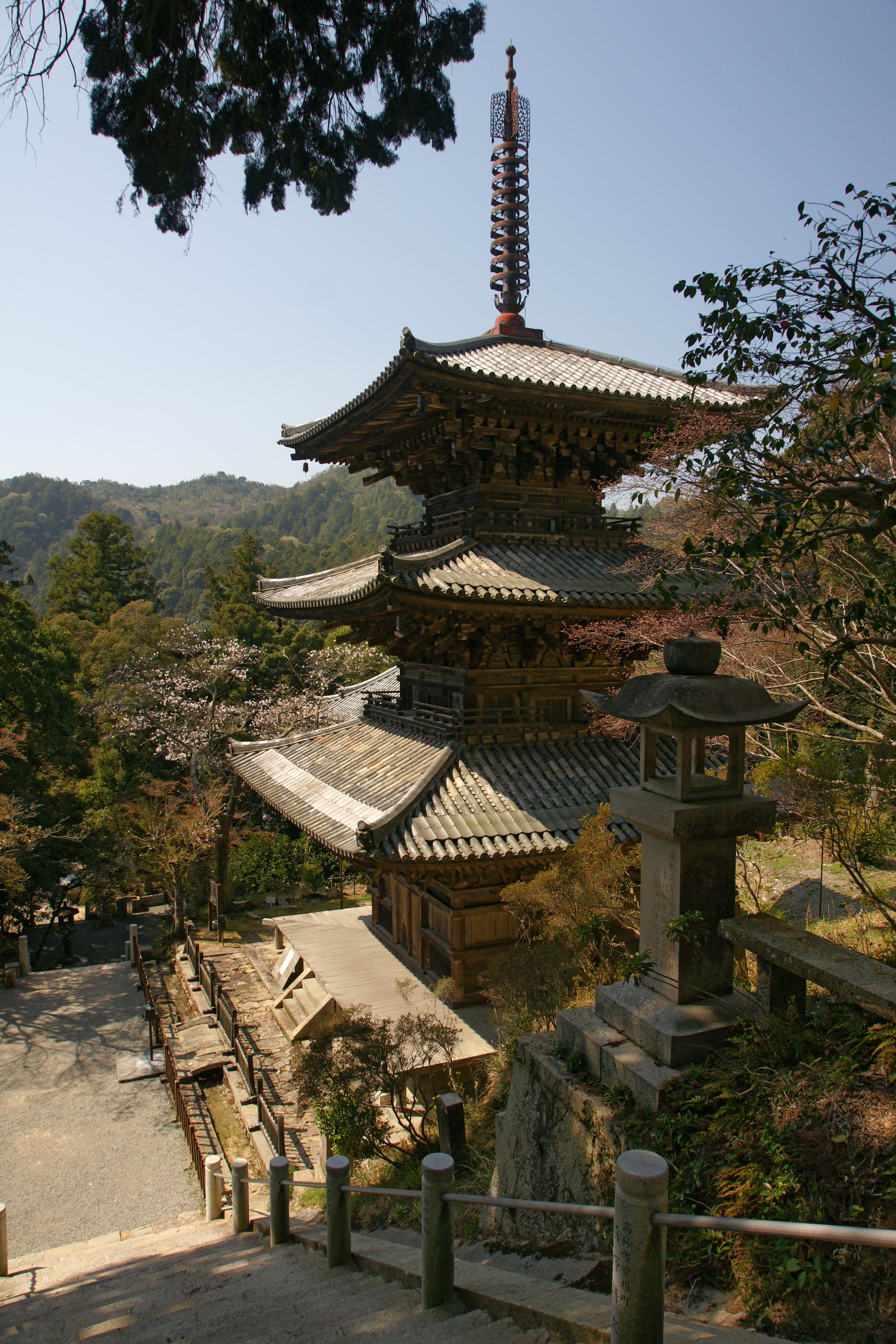
Ichijō-ji's pagoda

Kasai (加西市, Kasai-shi) is a city located in Hyōgo Prefecture, Japan. As of 30 April 2022, the city had an estimated population of 42,494 in 18,242 households and a population density of 72 persons per km^{2}. The total area of the city is 150.98 square kilometres (58.29 sq mi).

== Geography ==
Kasai is located almost in the center of the Harima Plain, with forests in the north and low mountains in the south. The city measures approximately 12.4 kilometers east–west, and 19.8 kilometers north–south. The main rivers that flow here are the Manganji River, which is one of the tributaries of the Kako River, and the Fukkoji River, which is a tributary of the Manganji River.

=== Neighbouring municipalities ===
Hyōgo Prefecture

- Fukusaki
- Himeji
- Ichikawa
- Kakogawa
- Katō
- Nishiwaki
- Ono
- Taka

=== Climate ===
Kasai has a humid subtropical climate (Köppen Cfa) characterized by warm summers and cool winters with light to no snowfall. The average annual temperature in Kasai is 14.9 °C. The average annual rainfall is 1606 mm with September as the wettest month. The temperatures are highest on average in August, at around 26.8 °C, and lowest in January, at around 3.5 °C.

== Demographics ==
Per Japanese census data, the population of Kasai has remained relatively steady over the past 70 years.

Historical population
Year	Pop.	±%
1920	39,586	—
1930	39,061	−1.3%
1940	38,642	−1.1%
1950	49,474	+28.0%
1960	49,234	−0.5%
1970	48,354	−1.8%
1980	51,051	+5.6%
1990	51,784	+1.4%
2000	51,104	−1.3%
2010	48,022	−6.0%

== History ==
The area of the modern city of Kasai was within ancient Harima Province. In the Edo Period, it was mostly tenryō territory administered directly by the Tokugawa shogunate with a small portion of the area under the control of Himeji Domain. The village of Hōjō was established within Kasai District with the creation of the modern municipalities system on April 1, 1889. Hōjō was elevated to town status on January 15, 1955. On April 1, 1967, Hōjō merged with the neighboring towns of Izumi and Kasai to form the city of Kasai.

== Government ==
Kasai has a mayor-council form of government with a directly elected mayor and a unicameral city council of 15 members. Kasai contributes one member to the Hyogo Prefectural Assembly. In terms of national politics, the city is part of Hyōgo 4th district of the lower house of the Diet of Japan.

== Economy ==
The economy of Kasai is centered around agriculture.

== Education ==
Kasai has 11 public elementary schools and four public middle schools operated by the city government and two public high school operated by the Hyōgo Prefectural Department of Education. The prefecture also operates one special education school for the handicapped.

== Transportation ==
=== Railway ===
Hōjō Railway Company – Hōjō Line

- Abiki - Tahara - Hokkeguchi - Harima-Shimosato - Osa - Harima-Yokota - Hōjōmachi

=== Highway ===
- Chūgoku Expressway
- National Route 372

=== Public transport ===
Kasai is highly dependent on private vehicles as the main form of transportation. Public transport is an inter-prefecture highway bus, inter-city bus (Shinki bus), KIX airport limousine bus (Hakuro bus), domestic-bus (Kasai city community bus, Happy bus) and Taxi.

== Sister cities ==
- Pullman, Washington, United States

== Local attractions ==
- Ichijō-ji, the temple's pagoda, completed in 1171, is a National Treasure of Japan
- Hyōgo Prefectural Flower Center
- Maruyama Park, where one can find the world's largest globe clock (Guinness certified) and reputedly the world's longest roller slide
- Rakan-ji, famous for its Gohyaku-Rakan statues (the 500 disciples of Buddha)
- Tamaoka Kofun Cluster, National Historic Site

== Noted people from Kasai ==
- Kiichi Inoue, politician
- Shiro Miya, musician
