= Ibo River =

Ibo River 揖保川
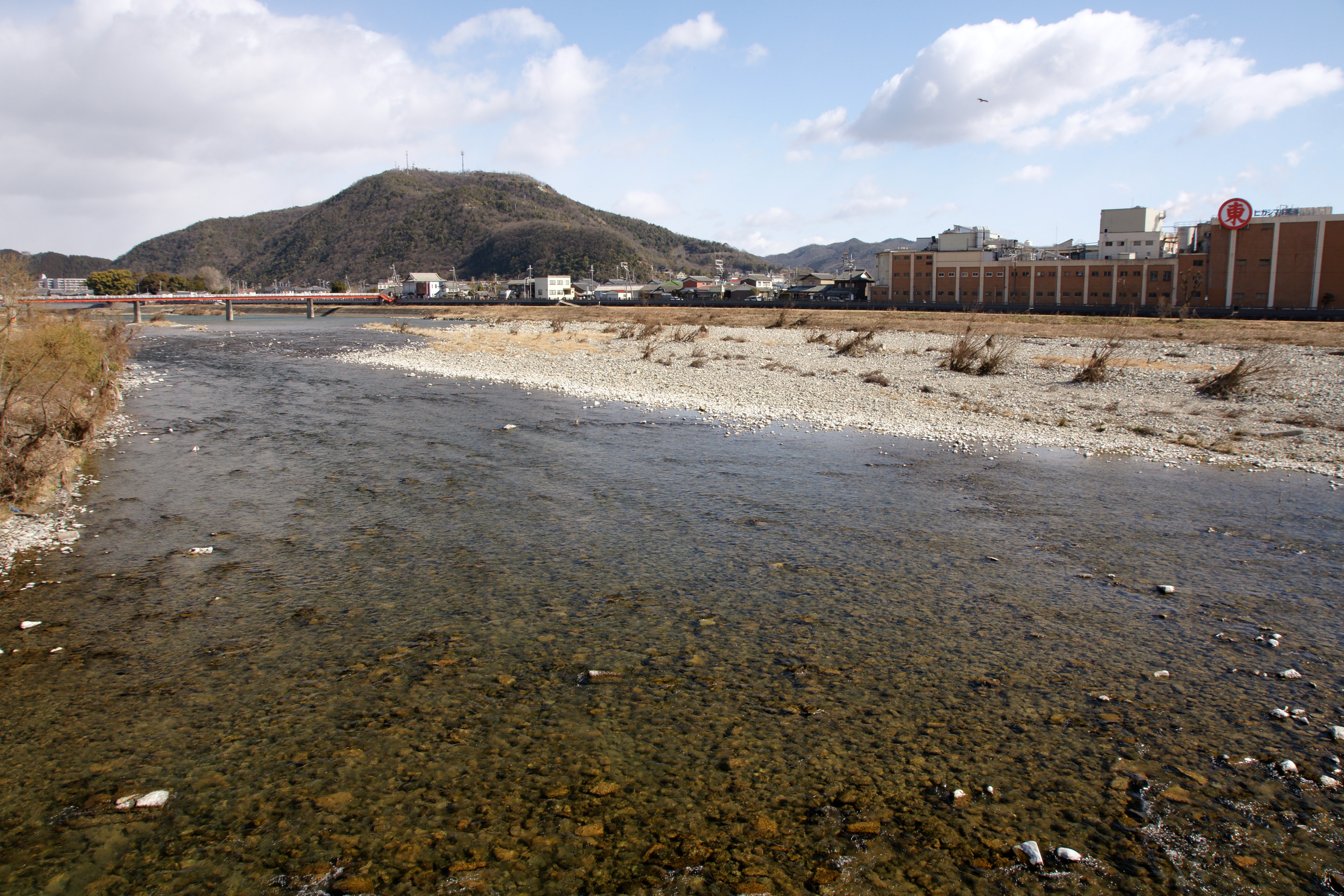
- Ibo River in 2010

- Location within Japan

Location
- Country: Japan
- State: Honshu
- Region: Hyōgo

Physical characteristics
- Source: Mount Fujinashi
  - elevation: 1,139 m (3,737 ft)
- Mouth: Harima Sea
  - coordinates: 34°46′10″N 134°35′07″E
- Length: 69.736 km (43.332 mi)
- Basin size: 810 km^{2} (310 sq mi)

The Ibo River (揖保川) is a Class A river in Hyōgo Prefecture, Japan. The Ibo, Kako, Ichi, Yumesaki, and Chikusa rivers are collectively referred to as the Harima Gokawa, the five major rivers that flow into the Harima Sea. The basin area is the second largest of the Harima Gokawa after the Kako River.

== Geography ==
The river originates from Mt. Fujinashi (elevation: 1,139 m; 3,737 ft) in Shisō, Hyōgo, and flows southward. It runs through Tatsuno and divides Nakagawa to the west near Yobeku, Himeji, forming a delta.

On the embankment in Tatsuno City, there is an area where tatami mats are used to raise the revetment by using the tatami mats when the water level rises.

== History ==
On September 13, 1976, a landslide occurred in Fukuchi, Ichinomiya-cho due to the torrential rain of Typhoon Fran. The spilled earth and sand filled the river channel and caused flooding.
