= Fudoki =

Ancient Japanese reports on local culture and geography

Fudoki (風土記) are ancient reports on provincial culture, geography, and oral tradition presented to the reigning monarchs of Japan, also known as local gazetteers. They contain agricultural, geographical, and historical records as well as mythology and folklore. Fudoki manuscripts also document local myths, rituals, and poems that are not mentioned in the Kojiki and the Nihon Shoki chronicles, which are the most important literature of the ancient national mythology and history. In the course of national unification, the imperial court enacted a series of criminal and administrative codes called ritsuryō and surveyed the provinces established by such codes to exert greater control over them.

== Kofudoki ==
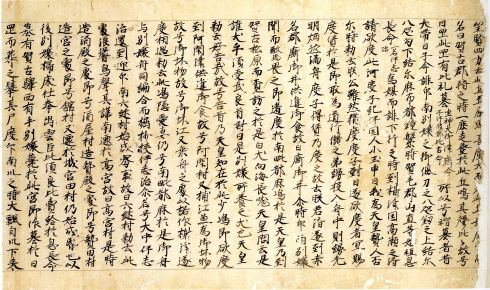
A scroll of the oldest extant Fudoki from Harima Province preserved at Tenri Central Library in Tenri, Nara

In the narrower sense, Fudoki refer to the oldest records written in the Nara period, later called Old-Fudoki (古風土記, Kofudoki). Compilation of Kofudoki began in 713 and was completed over a 20-year period. Following the Taika Reform in 646 and the Code of Taihō enacted in 701, there was need to centralize and solidify the power of the imperial court. This included accounting for lands under its control. According to the Shoku Nihongi, Empress Genmei issued a decree in 713 ordering each provincial government (ja:国衙, kokuga) to collect and report the following information:

- Etymology of names for geographic features, such as mountains, plains, and rivers
- Land fertility
- Myths, legends, and folktales told orally by old people
- Names of districts and townships
- Natural resources and living things

== Names ==
Empress Genmei ordered in 713 that place names in the provinces, districts, and townships be written in two kanji characters with positive connotations. This occasionally required name changes. For example, Hayatsuhime (速津媛) became Hayami (速見) and Ishinashi no Oki (石無堡) became Ishii (石井).

== Manuscripts ==
At least 48 of the Gokishichidō provinces contributed to their records but only that of Izumo remains nearly complete. Partial records of Hizen, Bungo, Harima and Hitachi remain and a few passages from various volumes remain scattered throughout various books. Those of Harima and Hizen are designated National Treasures.

The Izumo Fudoki, the only manuscript to survive in complete form, was compiled in 733 by Miyake no Omi Kanatatari under the supervision of Izumo no Omi Hiroshima; its composite character, drawing together several local chronicles, is credited with giving it the widest range of kami among the surviving Fudoki. On the basis of date and style, the extant Fudoki are further grouped into the Wadō Fudoki (Harima and Hitachi), which are stylistically closer to the Nihon Shoki, and the Tenpyō Fudoki (Izumo, Bungo, and Hizen); the two groups can also be distinguished by their use of the administrative terms gō or sato for "village", reflecting whether the text predates or postdates the abolition of the village-hamlet system in 739–740.

Below is a list of extant manuscripts and scattered passages.

=== Kinai ===
- Settsu Province: Settsu no Kuni Fudoki (摂津国風土記)
- Yamashiro Province: Yamashiro no Kuni Fudoki (山城国風土記)
- Yamato Province: Yamato no Kuni Fudoki (大和国風土記)

=== Tōkaidō ===
- Hitachi Province: Hitachi no Kuni Fudoki ja:常陸国風土記
- Iga Province: Iga no Kuni Fudoki (伊賀国風土記)
- Ise Province: Ise no Kuni Fudoki (伊勢国風土記)
- Izu Province: Izu no Kuni Fudoki (伊豆国風土記)
- Kai Province: Kai no Kuni Fudoki (甲斐国風土記)
- Kazusa Province: Kazusa no Kuni Fudoki (上総国風土記)
- Mikawa Province: Mikawa no Kuni Fudoki (参河(三河)国風土記)
- Owari Province: Owari no Kuni Fudoki (尾張国風土記)
- Sagami Province: Sagami no Kuni Fudoki (相模国風土記)
- Shima Province: Shima no Kuni Fudoki (志摩国風土記)
- Shimōsa Province: Shimousa no Kuni Fudoki (下総国風土記)
- Suruga Province: Suruga no Kuni Fudoki ja:駿河国風土記

=== Tōsandō ===
- Hida Province: Hida no Kuni Fudoki (飛騨国風土記)
- Ōmi Province: Ōmi no Kuni Fudoki ja:近江国風土記
- Michinoku Province: Michinoku no Kuni Fudoki 陸奥国風土記
- Mino Province: Mino no Kuni Fudoki (美濃国風土記)
- Shinano Province: Shinano no Kuni Fudoki (信濃国風土記)

=== Hokurikudō ===
- Echigo Province: Echigo no Kuni Fudoki (越後国風土記)
- Echizen Province: Echizen no Kuni Fudoki (越前国風土記)
- Wakasa Province: Wakasa no Kuni Fudoki (若狭国風土記)

=== San'indō ===
- Hōki Province: Hōki no Kuni Fudoki (伯耆国風土記)
- Inaba Province: Inaba no Kuni Fudoki (因幡国風土記)
- Iwami Province: Iwami no Kuni Fudoki (石見国風土記)
- Izumo Province: Izumo no Kuni Fudoki ja:出雲国風土記
- Tango Province: Tango no Kuni Fudoki ja:丹後国風土記

=== San'yōdō ===
- Bingo Province: Bingo no Kuni Fudoki ja:備後国風土記
- Bitchū Province: Bitchū no Kuni Fudoki (備中国風土記)
- Bizen Province: Bizen no Kuni Fudoki (備前国風土記)
- Harima Province: Harima no Kuni Fudoki ja:播磨国風土記
- Mimasaka Province: Mimasaka no Kuni Fudoki (美作国風土記)

=== Nankaidō ===
- Awa Province (Tokushima): Awa no Kuni Fudoki (阿波国風土記)
- Awaji Province: Awaji no Kuni Fudoki (淡路国風土記)
- Iyo Province: Iyo no Kuni Fudoki (伊予国風土記)
- Kii Province: Kii no Kuni Fudoki (紀伊国風土記)
- Sanuki Province: Sanuki no Kuni Fudoki (讃岐国風土記)
- Tosa Province: Tosa no Kuni Fudoki (土佐国風土記)

=== Saikaidō ===
- Bungo Province: Bungo no Kuni Fudoki ja:豊後国風土記
- Buzen Province: Buzen no Kuni Fudoki (豊前国風土記)
- Chikuzen Province: Chikuzen no Kuni Fudoki (筑前国風土記)
- Chikugo Province: Chikugo no Kuni Fudoki (筑後国風土記)
- Iki Province: Iki no Kuni Fudoki (壱岐国風土記)
- Higo Province: Higo no Kuni Fudoki (肥後国風土記)
- Hizen Province: Hizen no Kuni Fudoki ja:肥前国風土記
- Hyūga Province: Hyūga no Kuni Fudoki (日向国風土記)
- Ōsumi Province: Ōsumi no Kuni Fudoki (大隅国風土記)
- Satsuma Province: Satsuma no Kuni Fudoki (薩摩国風土記)

== Parks ==
In 1966 the Agency for Cultural Affairs called on the prefectural governments to build open-air museums and parks called Fudoki no Oka (風土記の丘, "Fudoki Hills") near historic sites such as tombs (kofun) and provincial temples. These archaeological museums preserve and exhibit cultural properties to enhance public understanding of provincial history and culture.

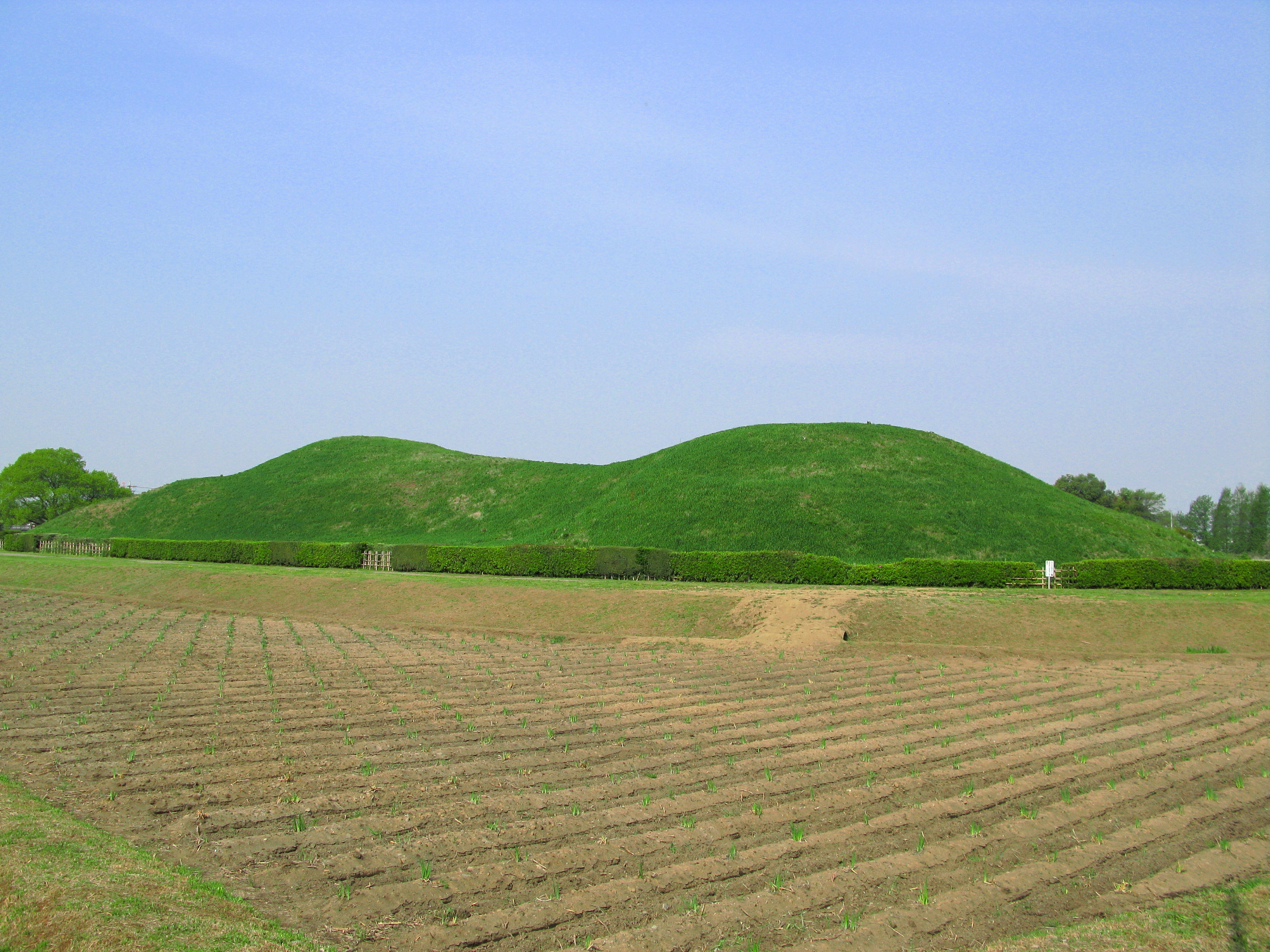
Futagoyama kofun in Sakitama Fudoki no Oka

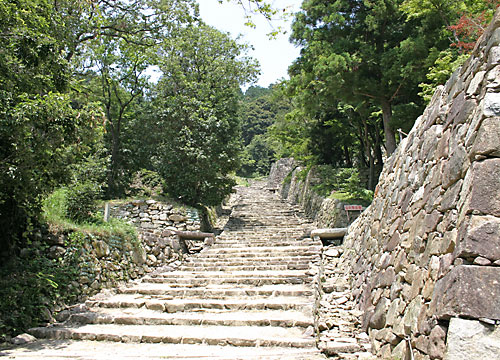
Azuchi Castle ruin in Ōmi Fudoki no Oka

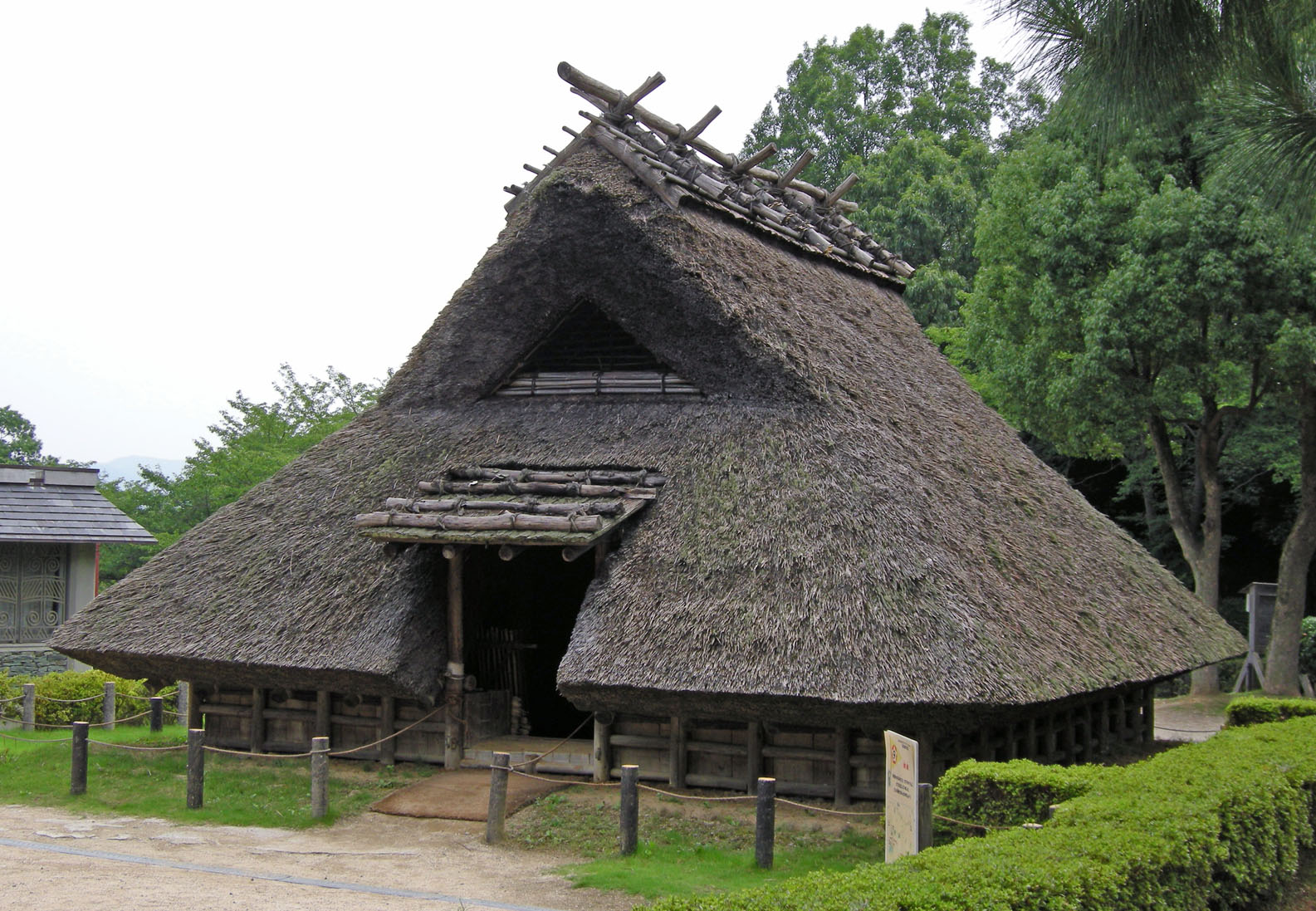
Pit house at the Kiifudoki-no-oka Museum of History

Name	Prefecture	Province	Municipalities	Museum
Ukitamu Fudoki no Oka	Yamagata	Uzen	Takahata	Yamagata Prefectural Ukitama Fudoki no Oka Archaeological Museum
Shimotsuke Fudoki no Oka	Tochigi	Shimotsuke	Shimotsuke	Tochigi Prefectural Shimotsuke Fudoki no Oka Museum
Nasu Fudoki no Oka	Tochigi	Shimotsuke	Nakagawa and Ōtawara	Nakagawa Municipal Nasu Fudoki no Oka Museum
Sakitama Fudoki no Oka	Saitama	Musashi	Gyōda	Saitama Prefectural Museum of the Sakitama Ancient Burial Mounds
Chiba Prefectural Boso-no-Mura	Chiba	Shimōsa	Sakae and Narita	Boso-no-Mura Museum
Tateyama Fudoki no Oka	Toyama	Etchū	Tateyama	Toyama Prefectural Tateyama Museum
Kai Fudoki no Oka	Yamanashi	Kai	Kōfu	Yamanashi Prefectural Archaeological Museum
Ōmi Fudoki no Oka	Shiga	Ōmi	Ōmihachiman and Azuchi	Shiga Prefectural Azuchi Castle Archaeological Museum
Chikatsu Asuka Fudoki no Oka	Osaka	Kawachi	Kanan	Osaka Prefectural Chikatsu Asuka Museum
Kii Fudoki no Oka	Wakayama	Kii	Wakayama	Wakayama Prefecture Kii-fudoki-no-oka Museum of Archaeology and Folklore
Yakumotatsu Fudoki no Oka	Shimane	Izumo	Matsue	Shimane Prefectural Yakumotatsu Fudoki no Oka Museum
Kibiji Fudoki no Oka	Okayama	Bitchū	Sōja	Sōja Kibiji Museum
Miyoshi Fudoki no Oka	Hiroshima	Bingo	Miyoshi	Hiroshima Prefectural Miyoshi Fudoki no Oka Museum
Higo Kodai no Mori	Kumamoto	Higo	Yamaga and Nagomi	Kumamoto Prefectural Ancient Burial Mound Museum
Usa Fudoki no Oka	Ōita	Bungo	Usa	Ōita Prefectural Museum of History
Saitobaru Fudoki no Oka	Miyazaki	Hyūga	Saito	Miyazaki Prefectural Saitobaru Archaeological Museum

== See also ==
- Japanese Historical Text Initiative
