= Ichi River =

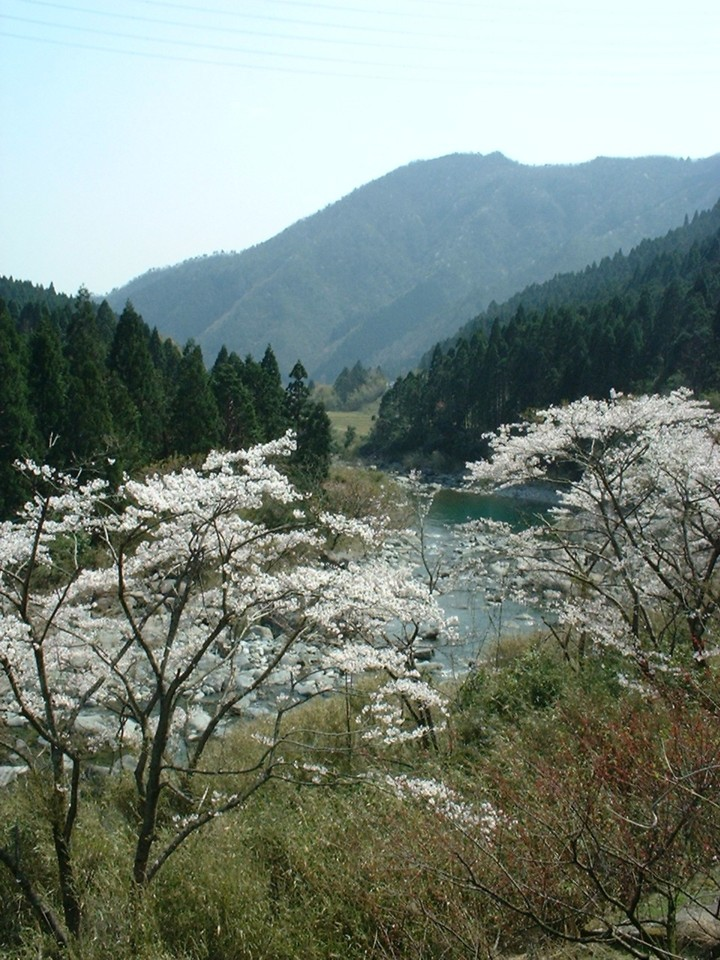

- Location within Japan
- Native name: 市川 (Japanese)

Location
- Country: Japan

Physical characteristics
- Source
  - elevation: 855 m
- Mouth: Harima Sea
  - coordinates: 34°46′27″N 134°40′27″E
- Length: 73 km (45 mi)
- Basin size: 496 km^{2}

Basin features
- Classification: Class B river

The Ichi River (市川, Ichi-kawa) is a river which flows through the southwest of Hyōgo Prefecture, Japan. The Ibo, Kako, Ichi, Yumesaki, and Chikusa rivers are collectively referred to as the Harima Gokawa, the five major rivers that flow into the Harima Sea.

== Geography ==
The Ichi River originates from Mount Mikuni (855m above sea level) in Ikuno, Asago City, near the border of the Tanba and Harima districts in central Hyōgo Prefecture, and flows southwards through the Kanzaki District and Himeji City, emptying into the Harima Sea at Himeji City.
