= Harima Sea =

Eastern part of the Seto Inland Sea in Japan

Coordinates: 34°29′N 134°36′E

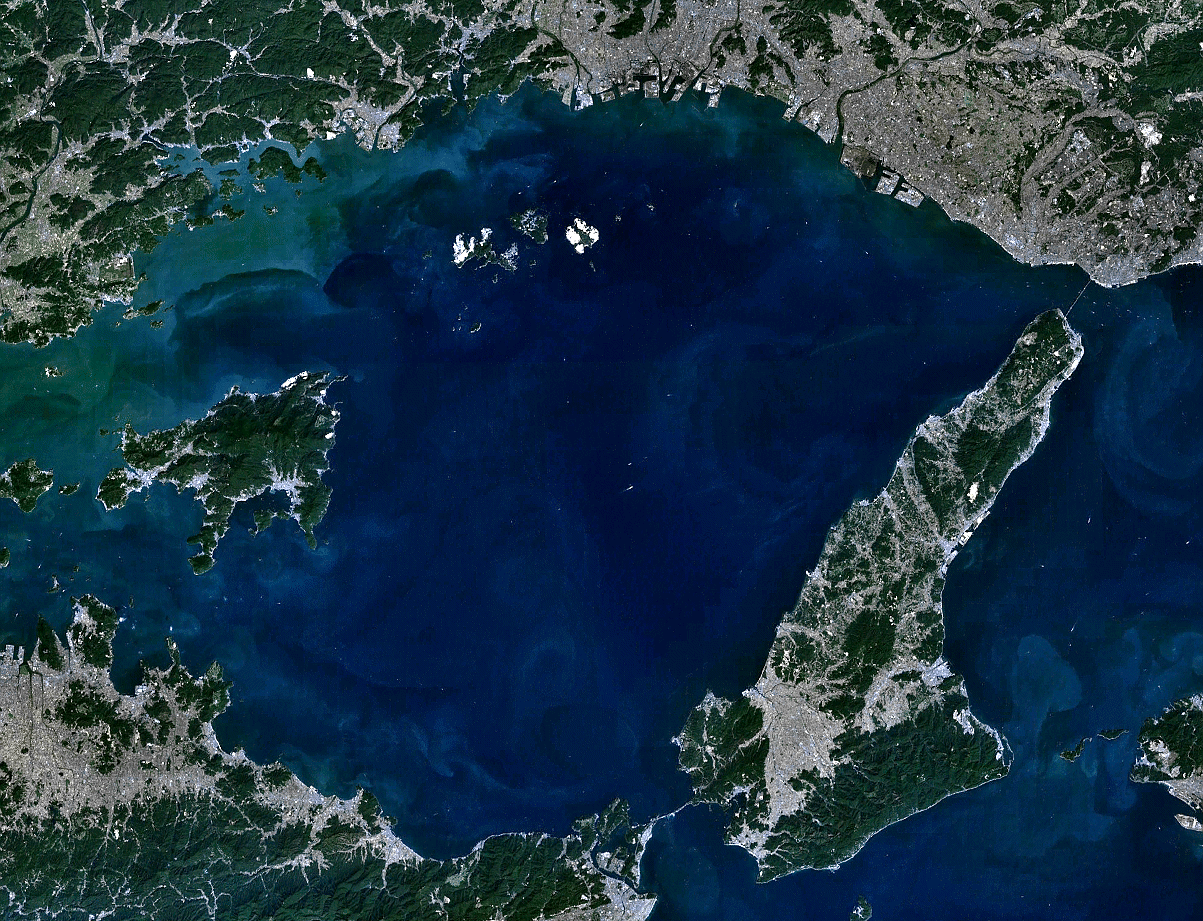
Harima Sea

Harima Sea (Japanese: 播磨灘) is the eastern part of the Seto Inland Sea in Japan. Located on the south side of the southwestern part of Hyōgo Prefecture (formerly Harima Province), it is bounded by Awaji Island to the east, Shodoshima to the west, and Shikoku in the south, with the Ieshima Islands in the northwest.

The area of the sea is approximately 2,500 square kilometres (970 mi^{2}), and the depth is around 40 metres (130 ft), however in some areas the depth exceeds 100 metres (330 ft). An important route crosses from the Kinki region to the Chugoku, Shikoku, and Kyushu regions.

There are many rocky reefs, which are good fishing grounds for sea bream. Sand lance are often caught, and Tsukudani (sand lance simmered in soy sauce and mirin) is a specialty of Banshu, but production has been declining due to the damage to sand lance habitat caused by the extraction of sea sand.

== Rivers ==
- Hyōgo Prefecture
  - Kakogawa, Ichikawa, Yumesakigawa, Ibogawa, Chikusagawa (collectively referred to as Harima Gokawa), Senba River, Noda River, Ōtsumo River (Himeji City), Mihara River (Minamiawaji)
- Kagawa Prefecture
  - Minatogawa (Higashikagawa City)

== Port towns ==
- Sakoshi
- Iwashihama
- Iwami
- Murotsu
- Fukuura
- Hiketa
- Takasu (Takasago City)
- Hinase (Okayama Prefecture)
- Ushimado (Okayama Prefecture)

=== Industrial ports ===
- Himeji Port (Shikama, Hirohata, Aboshi)
- Higashiharima Port

== Islands ==
- Awaji Island
- Ieshima Islands
  - Ieshima
  - Tanga Island
  - Boze Island
  - Nishijima
- Shodoshima
