= Ao Station =

Railway station in Ono, Hyōgo Prefecture, Japan

Ao Station 粟生駅
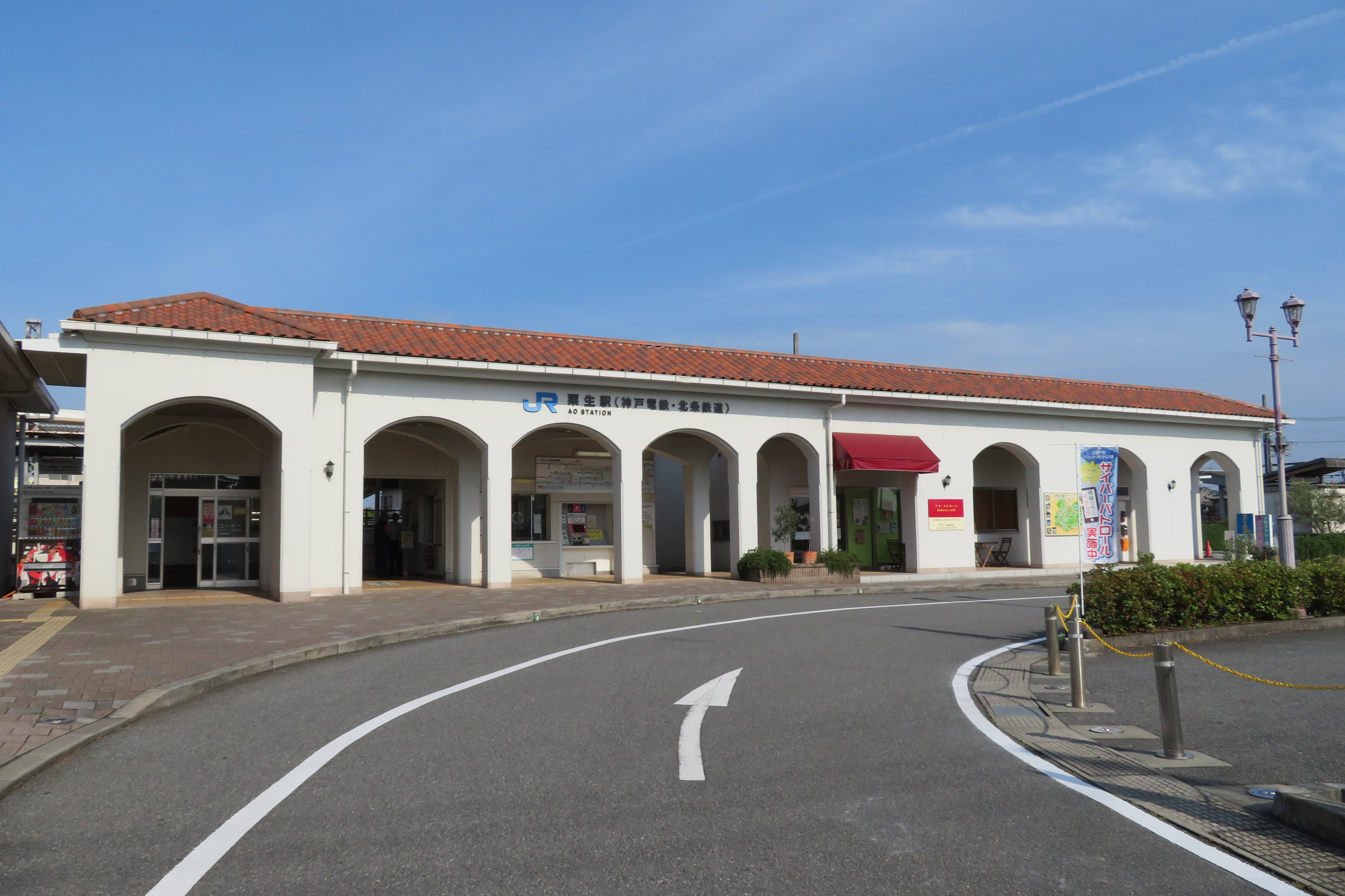
- Ao Station in June 2019

General information
- Location: 1821 Ao-cho Maeda, Ono-shi, Hyōgo-ken 675-1358; Japan
- Coordinates: 34°51′25″N 134°54′36″E
- Operator: JR West; Hōjō Railway; Kobe Electric Railway
- Lines: I Kakogawa Line; ■ Hōjō Line; ■ Ao Line
- Platforms: 1 bay + 1 side + 1 island platform
- Connections: Bus stop

Other information
- Status: Unstaffed
- Station code: KB59 (Hojo Railway)
- Website: Official website

History
- Opened: 13 October 1913

Passengers
- FY2019: 1038 (JR); 859 (Shintetsu) daily
Location
- Location within Hyōgo Prefecture Location within Japan

Ao Station (粟生駅, Ao-eki) is a junction passenger railway station located in the city of Ono, Hyōgo Prefecture, Japan. It is operated jointly by West Japan Railway Company (JR West), the third-sector Hojo Railway Company (北条鉄道株式会社, Hōjō Tetsudō Kabushiki-gaisha), and the private Kobe Electric Railway (Shintetsu).

== Lines ==
Ao Station is served by the JR West Kakogawa Line and is 16.6 kilometers from the terminus of the line at Kakogawa. It is also the terminal station of the 13.7 kilometer Hōjō Railway Hōjō Line and the 29.2 kilometer Ao Line.

== Station layout ==
The station consists of a ground-level side platform, island platform, and bay platform, all connected by a footbridge. The station is unattended.

=== Platforms ===
4	■ Ao Line	for Suzurandai, Shinkaichi, Arima Onsen and Sanda
-	■	former platform, now unused
2	■ Kakogawa Line	for Yakujin and Kakogawa
1	■ Kakogawa Line	for Nishiwakishi and Tanikawa
3	■ Hōjō Railway Hōjō Line	for Hokkeguchi and Hōjōmachi

== Adjacent stations ==
«	Service	»
West Japan Railway Company (JR West)
Kakogawa Line
Onomachi	-	Kawainishi
Hōjō Railway
Hōjō Line
Terminus	-	Abiki
Kobe Electric Railway
Ao Line
Hata	-	Terminus

== History ==
Ao Station opened on August 10, 1913. With the privatization of the Japan National Railways (JNR) on April 1, 1987, the station came under the aegis of the West Japan Railway Company.

== Passenger statistics ==
In fiscal 2019, the JR portion of the station was used by an average of 1038 passengers daily and the Shintetsu portion of the station was used by 859 passengers daily.

== Surrounding area ==
- Ono Station Park
- Awao Children's Garden

== See also ==
- List of railway stations in Japan
