= Kizu Station (Hyōgo) =

Railway station in Kobe, Japan

Kizu Station 木津駅
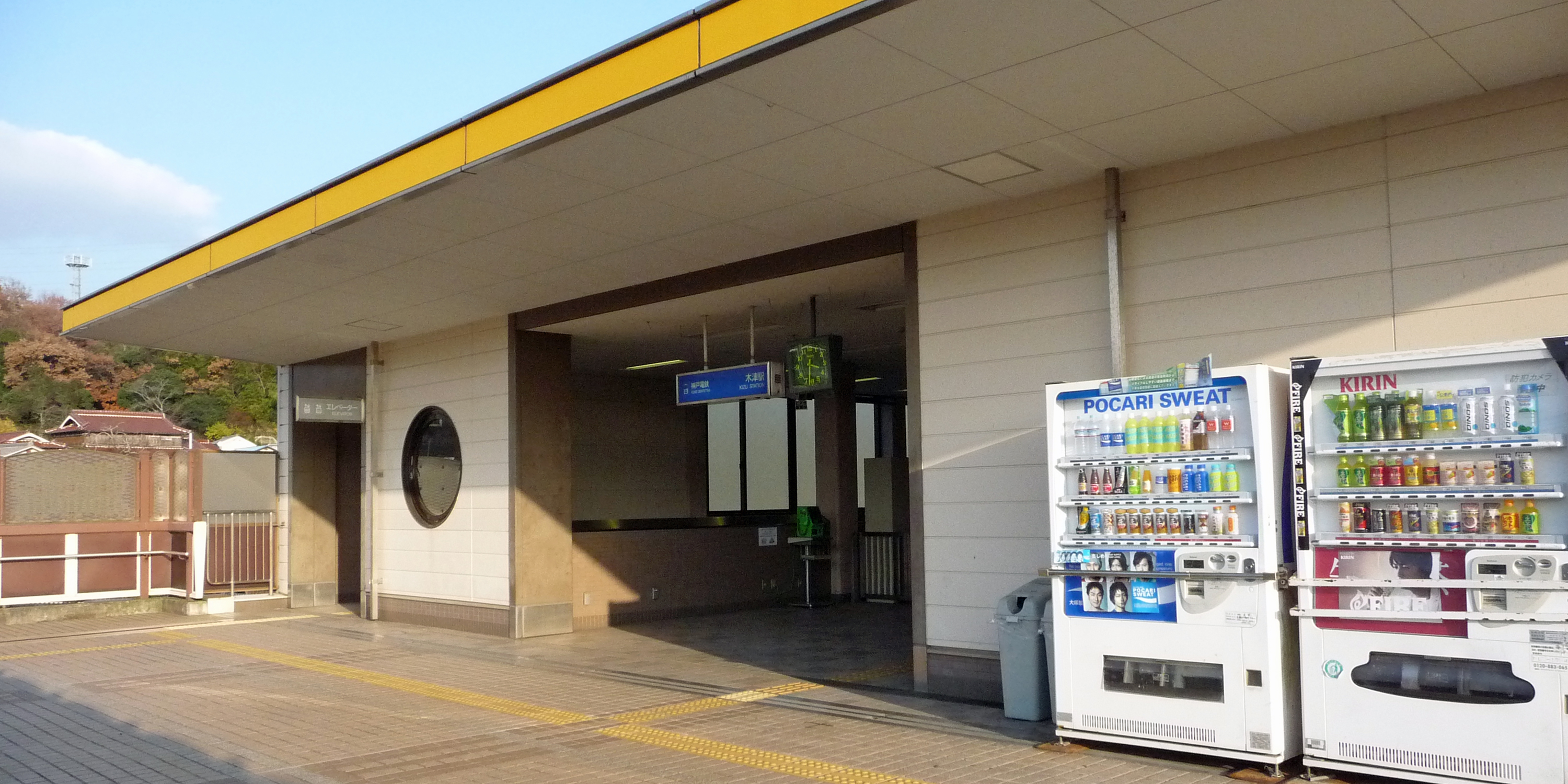
- Kizu Station, December 2008

General information
- Location: Kizu Oshibedanicho, Nishi-ku, Kobe-shi, Hyōgo-ken 651-2222; Japan
- Coordinates: 34°44′39″N 135°05′18″E
- Operator: Kobe Electric Railway
- Line: ■ Ao Line
- Distance: 6.4 km from Suzurandai
- Platforms: 2 side platforms
- Connections

Other information
- Station code: KB44
- Website: Official website

History
- Opened: 27 April 1937
- Former names: Dentetsu Kizu (1952-1988)

Passengers
- FY2019: 607
Location
- Location within Hyōgo Prefecture Location within Japan

Kizu Station (木津駅, Kizu-eki) is a passenger railway station located in Nishi-ku, Kobe, Hyōgo Prefecture, Japan, operated by the private Kobe Electric Railway (Shintetsu).

== Lines ==
Kizu Station is served by the Ao Line and is 6.4 kilometers from the terminus of the line at Suzurandai and is 13.9 kilometers from Minatogawa and 14.3 kilometers from Shinkaichi.

== Station layout ==
The station consists of two unnumbered ground-level side platforms connected by an elevated station building. The station is unattended.

=== Platforms ===
ascending	■ Ao Line	for Shijimi, Ebisu, Ono and Ao
descending	■ Ao Line	for Nishi-Suzurandai, Suzurandai and Shinkaichi

== Adjacent stations ==
«	Service	»
Shintetsu Ao Line
Aina	Local	Kobata
Aina	Semi-Express	Kobata
Express (running only for Shinkaichi): Does not stop at this station
Rapid Express: Does not stop at this station

== History ==
Kizu Station opened on April 27, 1937. It was renamed Dentetsu-Kizu Station (電鉄木津駅) on October 1, 1952 but reverted to its original name on April 1, 1988.

== Passenger statistics ==
In fiscal 2019, the station was used by an average of 607 passengers daily.

== Surrounding area ==
- Kobe Techno Logistic Park
- Kensoninken Shrine

== See also ==
- List of railway stations in Japan
