= Oshibedani Station =

Railway station in Kobe, Japan

Oshibedani Station 押部谷駅
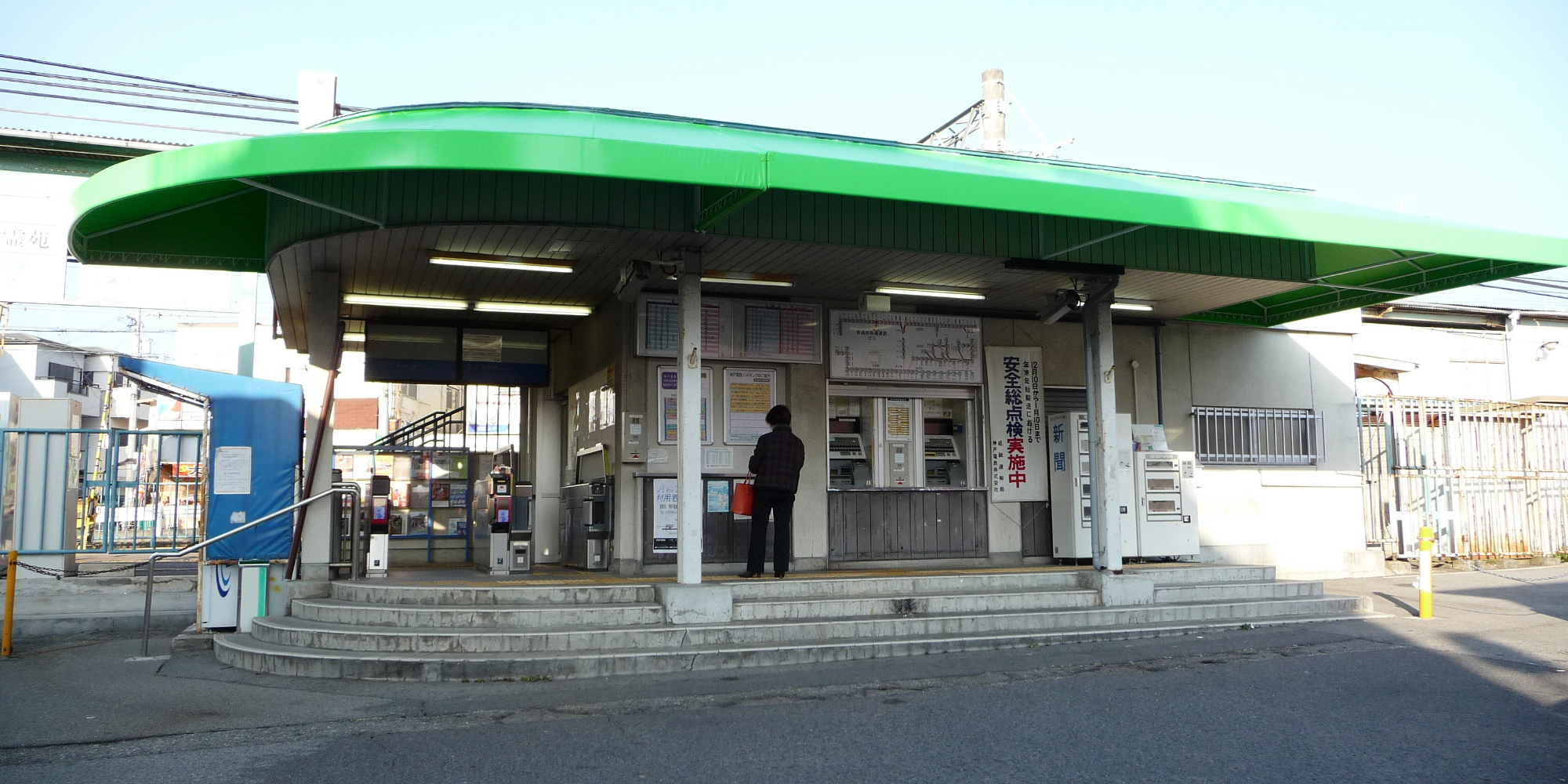
- Oshibedani Station, January 2008

General information
- Location: Fukuzumi Oshibedanicho, Nishi-ku, Kobe-shi, Hyōgo-ken 651-2213; Japan
- Coordinates: 34°45′24″N 135°02′21″E
- Operator: Kobe Electric Railway
- Line: ■ Ao Line
- Distance: 11.2 km from Suzurandai
- Platforms: 1 side + 1 island platform
- Connections

Other information
- Station code: KB47
- Website: Official website

History
- Opened: 28 December 1936

Passengers
- FY2019: 680
Location
- Location within Hyōgo Prefecture Location within Japan

Oshibedani Station (押部谷駅, Oshibedani-eki) is a passenger railway station located in Nishi-ku, Kobe, Hyōgo Prefecture, Japan, operated by the private Kobe Electric Railway (Shintetsu).

== Lines ==
Oshibedani Station is served by the Ao Line and is 11.2 kilometers from the terminus of the line at Suzurandai and is 18.7 kilometers from Minatogawa and 19.1 kilometers from Shinkaichi.

== Station layout ==
The station consists of a ground-level side platform and one ground-level island platform connected to the station building by a level crossing. The station is unattended.

=== Platforms ===
1	■ Ao Line	for Shijimi, Ebisu, Ono and Ao
2, 3	■ Ao Line	for Kobata, Nishi-Suzurandai, Suzurandai and Shinkaichi

== Adjacent stations ==
«	Service	»
Shintetsu Ao Line
Sakae	Local	Midorigaoka
Sakae	Semi-Express	Midorigaoka
Sakae	Express (running only for Shinkaichi)	Midorigaoka
Nishi-Suzurandai	Rapid Express	Midorigaoka

== History ==
Oshibedani Station opened on December 28, 1936.

== Passenger statistics ==
In fiscal 2019, the station was used by an average of 680 passengers daily.

== Surrounding area ==
- Kobe Municipal Oshibedani Elementary School
- Kobe Municipal Oshibedani Junior High School

== See also ==
- List of railway stations in Japan
