= Sakae Station (Hyōgo) =

Railway station in Kobe, Japan

Sakae Station 栄駅
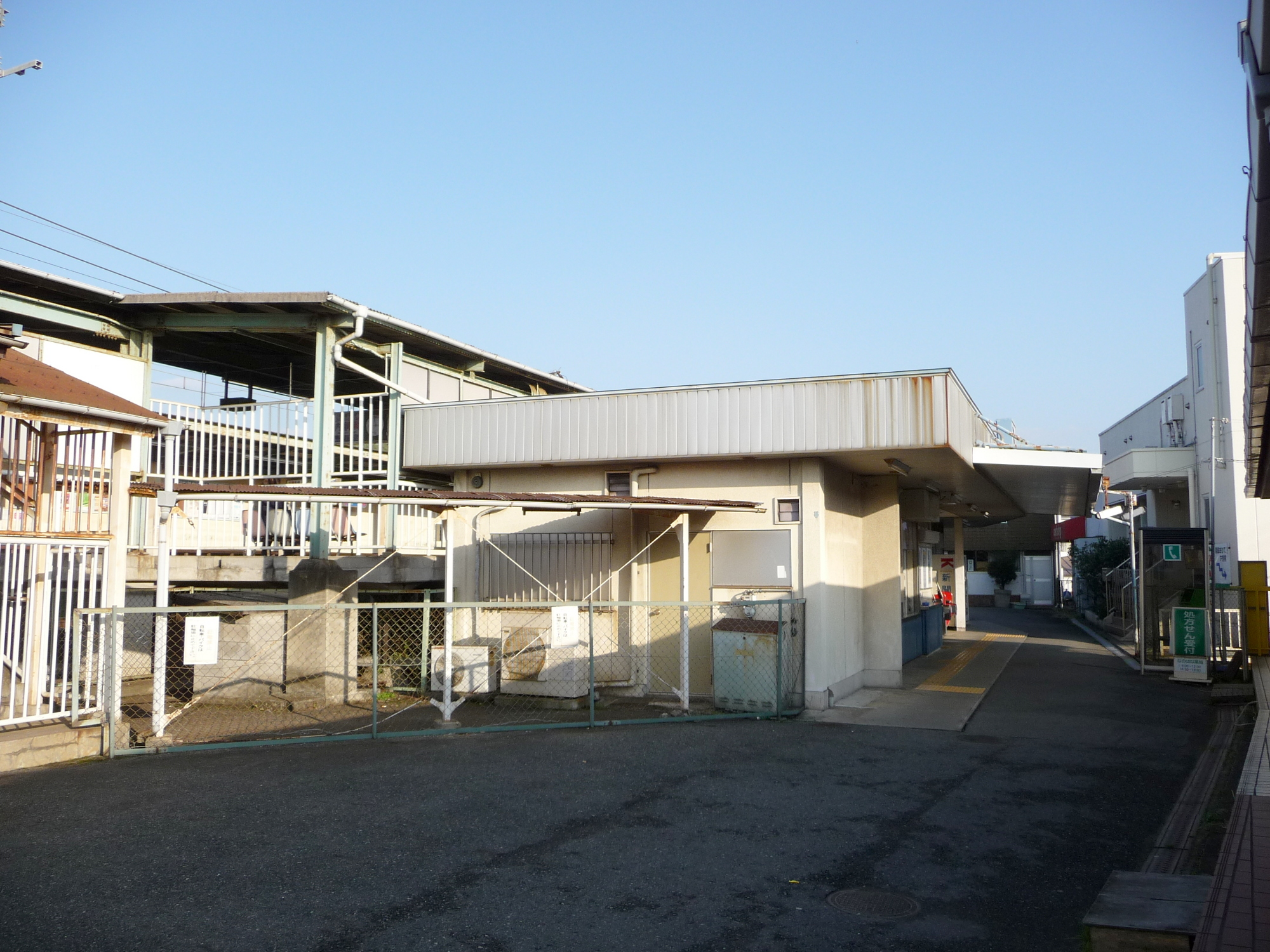
- Sakae Station, December 2008

General information
- Location: Sakae Oshibedanicho, Nishi-ku, Kobe-shi, Hyōgo-ken 651-2211; Japan
- Coordinates: 34°45′19″N 135°03′24″E
- Operator: Kobe Electric Railway
- Line: ■ Ao Line
- Distance: 9.6 km from Suzurandai
- Platforms: 2 side platforms
- Connections

Other information
- Station code: KB46
- Website: Official website

History
- Opened: 15 June 1937
- Former names: Dentetsu Sakae (1952-1988)

Passengers
- FY2019: 669
Location
- Location within Hyōgo Prefecture Location within Japan

Sakae Station (栄駅, Sakae-eki) is a passenger railway station located in Nishi-ku, Kobe, Hyōgo Prefecture, Japan, operated by the private Kobe Electric Railway (Shintetsu).

== Lines ==
Sakae Station is served by the Ao Line and is 9.6 kilometers from the terminus of the line at Suzurandai and is 17.1 kilometers from Minatogawa and 17.5 kilometers from Shinkaichi.

== Station layout ==
The station consists of two unnumbered ground-level side platforms connected to the station building by a level crossing. The station is unattended.

=== Platforms ===
station side	■ Ao Line	for Shijimi, Ebisu, Ono and Ao
opposite side	■ Ao Line	for Kobata, Nishi-Suzurandai, Suzurandai and Shinkaichi

== Adjacent stations ==
«	Service	»
Shintetsu Ao Line
Kobata	Local	Oshibedani
Kobata	Semi-Express	Oshibedani
Kobata	Express (running only for Shinkaichi)	Oshibedani
Rapid Express: Does not stop at this station

== History ==
Sakai Station opened on June 15, 1937. It was renamed Dentetsu-Sakae Station (電鉄栄駅) on October 1, 1952 but reverted to its original name on April 1, 1988.

== Passenger statistics ==
In fiscal 2019, the station was used by an average of 669 passengers daily.

== Surrounding area ==
- Sakuragaoka and Tsukigaoka residential areas
- Kobe City Shinkatsu High School.

== See also ==
- List of railway stations in Japan
