= Kobata Station =

Railway station in Kobe, Japan

Kobata Station 木幡駅
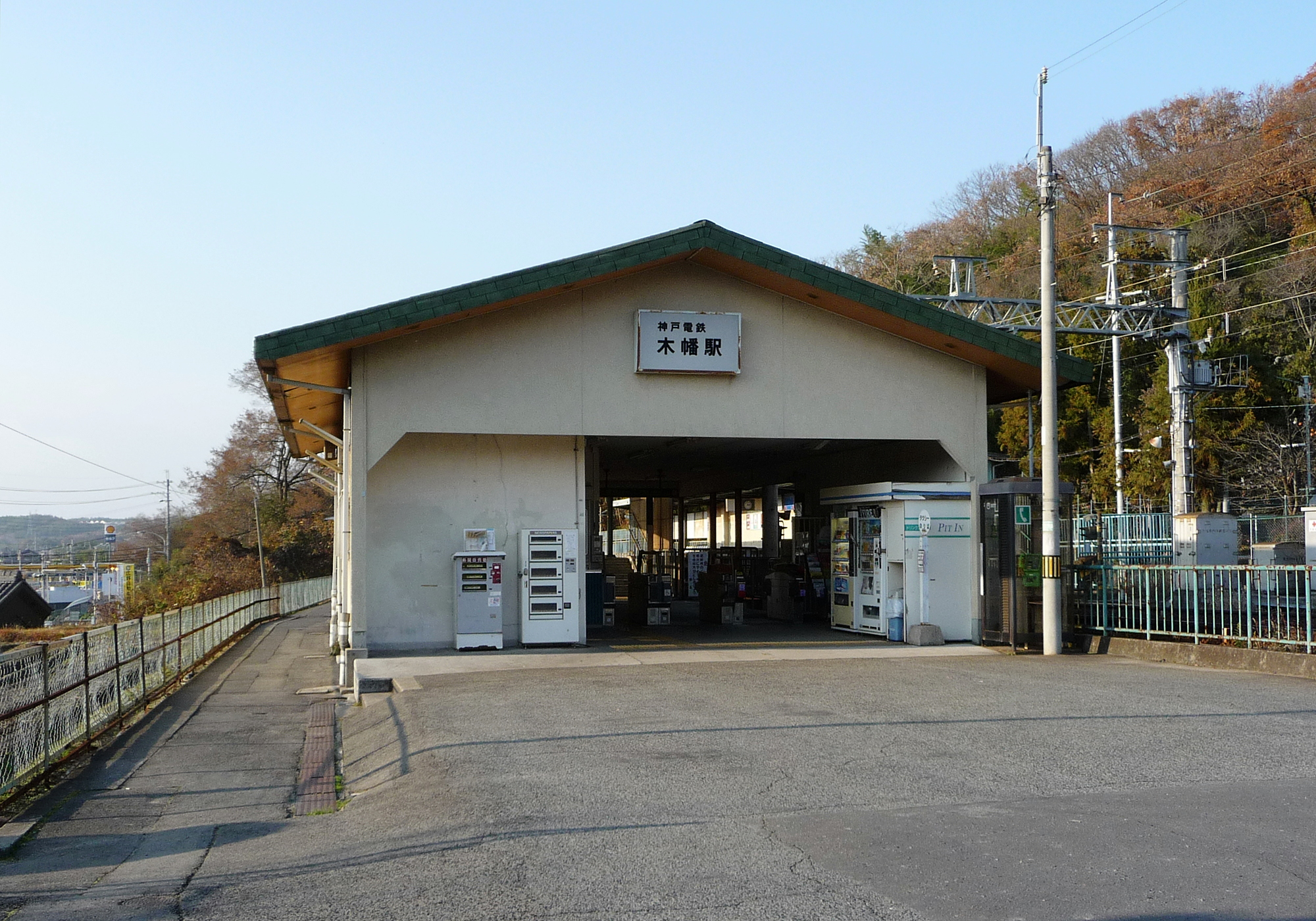
- Kobata Station, December 2008

General information
- Location: Kizu Oshibedanicho, Nishi-ku, Kobe-shi, Hyōgo-ken 651-2222; Japan
- Coordinates: 34°44′54″N 135°04′16″E
- Operator: Kobe Electric Railway
- Line: ■ Ao Line
- Distance: 8.1 km from Suzurandai
- Platforms: 2 side platforms
- Connections

Other information
- Station code: KB45
- Website: Official website

History
- Opened: 15 June 1937
- Former names: Dentetsu Kobata (1952-1988)

Passengers
- FY2019: 374
Location
- Location within Hyōgo Prefecture Location within Japan

Kobata Station (木幡駅, Kobata-eki) is a passenger railway station located in Nishi-ku, Kobe, Hyōgo Prefecture, Japan, operated by the private Kobe Electric Railway (Shintetsu).

== Lines ==
Kobata Station is served by the Ao Line and is 8.1 kilometers from the terminus of the line at Suzurandai and is 15.6 kilometers from Minatogawa and 16.0 kilometers from Shinkaichi.

== Station layout ==
The station consists of two unnumbered ground-level side platforms connected to the station building by a level crossing. The station is unattended.

=== Platforms ===
station side	■ Ao Line	for Shijimi, Ebisu, Ono and Ao
opposite side	■ Ao Line	for Nishi-Suzurandai, Suzurandai and Shinkaichi

== Adjacent stations ==
«	Service	»
Shintetsu Ao Line
Kizu	Local	Sakae
Kizu	Semi-Express	Sakae
Nishi-Suzurandai	Express (running only for Shinkaichi)	Sakae
Rapid Express: Does not stop at this station

== History ==
Kobata Station opened on June 15, 1937. It was renamed Dentetsu-Kobata Station (電鉄木幡駅) on October 1, 1952 but reverted to its original name on April 1, 1988.

== Passenger statistics ==
In fiscal 2019, the station was used by an average of 374 passengers daily.

== Surrounding area ==
- Akihadai residential area

== See also ==
- List of railway stations in Japan
