= Hata Station (Hyōgo) =

Railway station in Ono, Hyōgo Prefecture, Japan

Hata Station 葉多駅
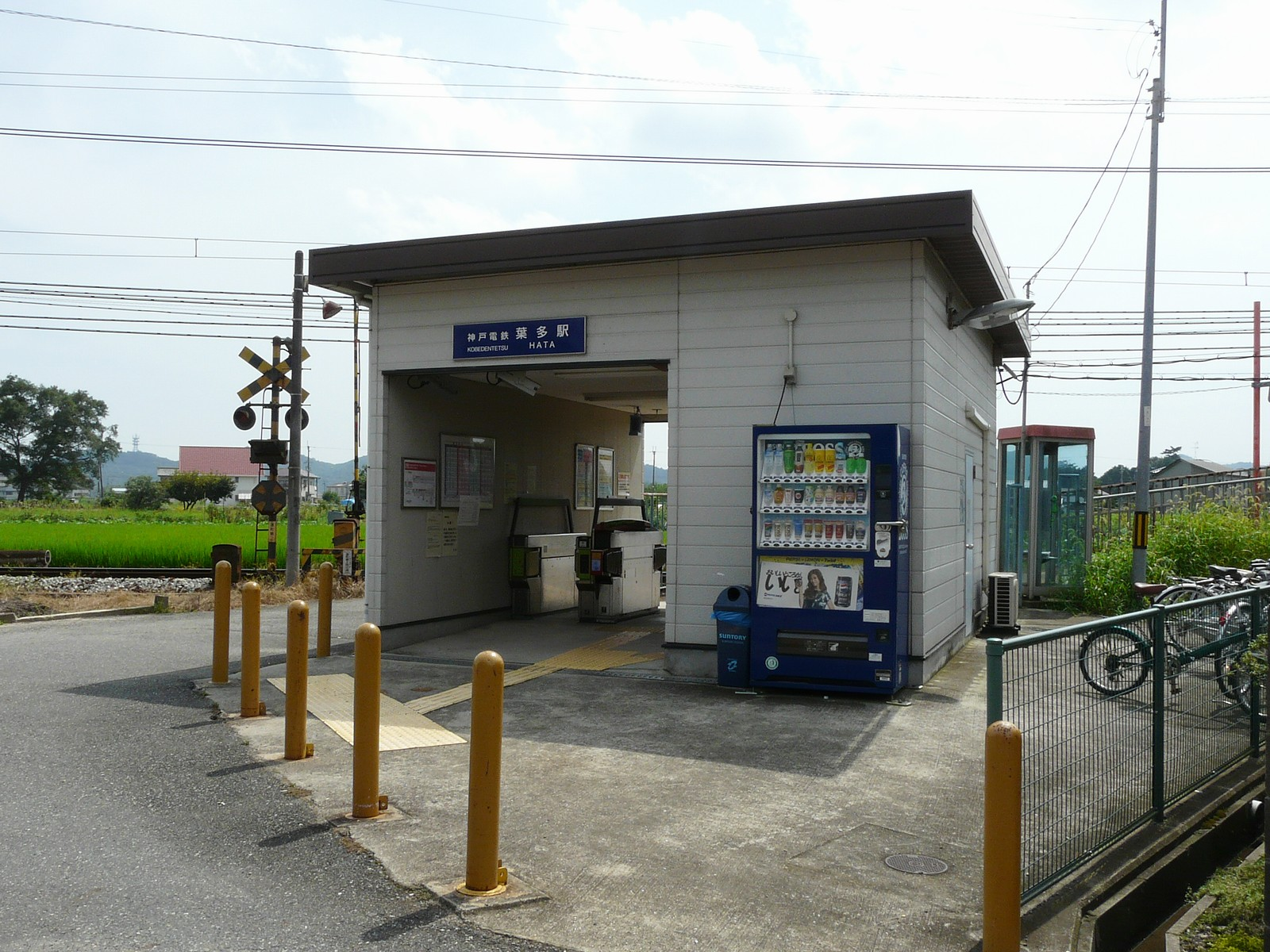
- Hata Station, July 2009

General information
- Location: 578-2, Hata-cho Aza Yagauchi, Ono-shi, Hyōgo-ken 675-1337; Japan
- Coordinates: 34°51′01″N 134°55′12″E
- Operator: Kobe Electric Railway
- Line: ■ Ao Line
- Distance: 27.7 km from Suzurandai
- Platforms: 1 side platform
- Connections

Other information
- Station code: KB58
- Website: Official website

History
- Opened: 10 April 1952

Passengers
- FY2019: 103
Location
- Location within Hyōgo Prefecture Location within Japan

Hata Station (葉多駅, Hata-eki) is a passenger railway station located in the city of Ono, Hyōgo Prefecture, Japan, operated by the private Kobe Electric Railway (Shintetsu).

== Lines ==
Hata Station is served by the Ao Line and is 27.7 kilometers from the terminus of the line at Suzurandai and is 35.2 kilometers from Minatogawa and 35.6 kilometers from Shinkaichi.

== Station layout ==
The station consists of a ground-level side platform serving a single bi-directional track. The station is unattended.

== Adjacent stations ==
«	Service	»
Shintetsu Ao Line
Ono	Express	Ao
Ono	Semi-Express	Ao
Ono	Local	Ao

== History ==
Hata Station opened on April 10, 1952.

== Passenger statistics ==
In fiscal 2019, the station was used by an average of 103 passengers daily.

== Surrounding area ==
- Hyogo Prefectural Ono Technical High School

== See also ==
- List of railway stations in Japan
