= Miki Uenomaru Station =

Railway station in Miki, Hyōgo Prefecture, Japan

Miki Uenomaru Station 三木上の丸駅
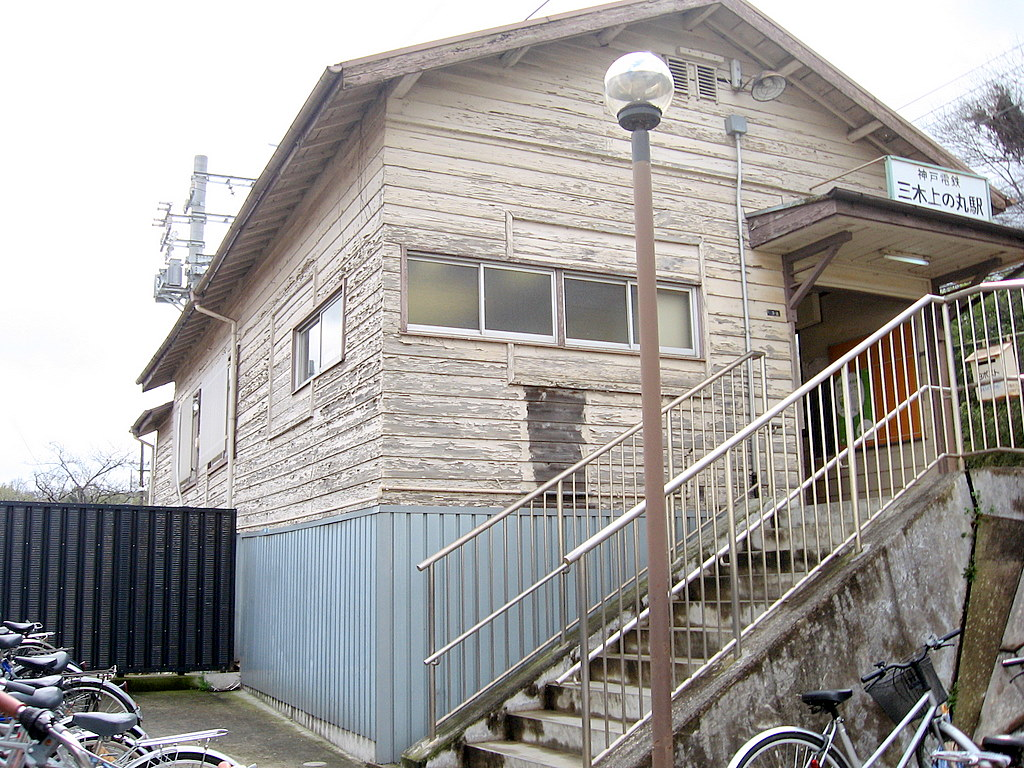
- Station entrance

General information
- Location: 3-8, Hommachi 1-chome, Miki-shi, Hyōgo-ken 673-0432; Japan
- Coordinates: 34°48′01″N 134°59′19″E
- Operator: Kobe Electric Railway
- Line: ■ Ao Line
- Distance: 18.6 km from Suzurandai
- Platforms: 1 side platform
- Connections

Other information
- Station code: KB52
- Website: Official website

History
- Opened: 28 December 1936
- Former names: Mikihigashiguchi → Uenomaru (until 1948)

Passengers
- FY2019: 200
Location
- Location within Hyōgo Prefecture Location within Japan

Miki Uenomaru Station (三木上の丸駅, Miki Uenomaru-eki) is a passenger railway station located in the city of Miki, Hyōgo Prefecture, Japan, operated by the private Kobe Electric Railway (Shintetsu).

== Lines ==
Miki Uenomaru Station is served by the Ao Line and is 18.6 kilometers from the terminus of the line at Suzurandai and is 26.1 kilometers from Minatogawa and 26.5 kilometers from Shinkaichi.

== Station layout ==
The station consists of a one side platform serving a single bi-directional track, whilst being unattended service staff.

== Adjacent stations ==
«	Service	»
Shintetsu Ao Line
Ebisu	Express	Miki
Ebisu	Semi-Express	Miki
Ebisu	Local	Miki

== History ==
Miki Uenomaru Station opened on December 28, 1937 as Mikihigashiguchi Station (三木東口駅). It was renamed Uenomaru Station (上の丸駅) on April 1, 1939 and to its present name on October 1, 1948.

== Passenger statistics ==
In fiscal 2019, the station was used by an average of 200 passengers daily.

== Surrounding area ==
- Miki Castle Ruins
- Miki City Horiko Museum
- Miki Municipal Hardware Museum
- Miki History Museum

== See also ==
- List of railway stations in Japan
