= Ichiba Station (Shintetsu) =

Railway station in Ono, Hyōgo Prefecture, Japan

Ichiba Station 市場駅
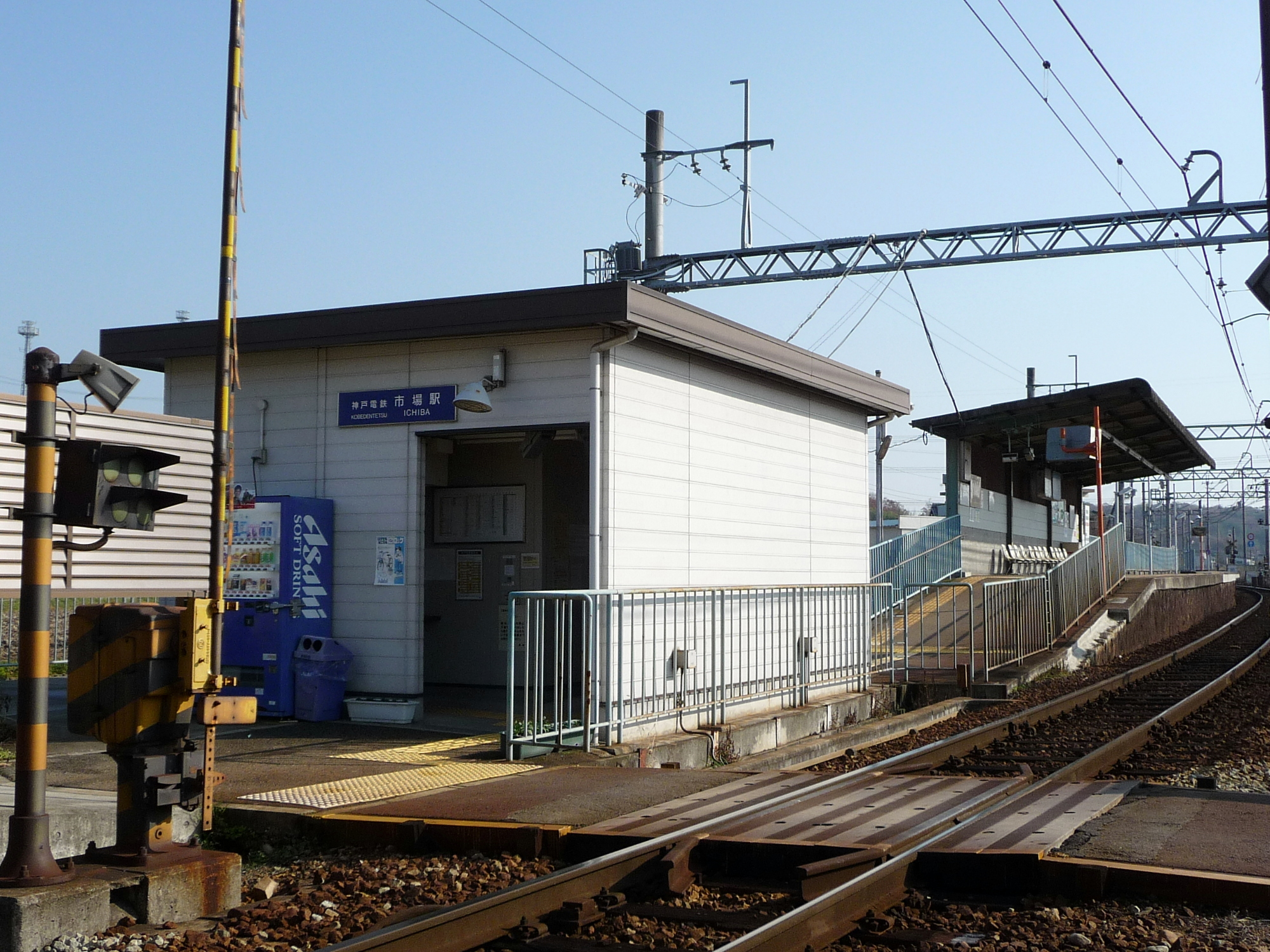
- Shintetsu Ichiba Station, December 2008

General information
- Location: 410-2, Ikejiri-cho Aza Onokachi, Ono-shi, Hyōgo-ken 675-1326; Japan
- Coordinates: 34°49′28″N 134°56′40″E
- Operator: Kobe Electric Railway
- Line: ■ Ao Line
- Distance: 23.9 km from Suzurandai
- Platforms: 1 side platform
- Connections

Other information
- Station code: KB56
- Website: Official website

History
- Opened: 28 December 1951
- Former names: Dentetsu Ichiba (until 1988)

Passengers
- 2019: 100 daily
Location
- Location within Hyōgo Prefecture Location within Japan

Ichiba Station (市場駅, Ichiba-eki) is a passenger railway station located in the city of Ono, Hyōgo Prefecture, Japan, operated by the private Kobe Electric Railway (Shintetsu).

== Lines ==
Ichiba Station is served by the Ao Line and is 23.9 kilometers from the terminus of the line at Suzurandai and is 31.4 kilometers from Minatogawa and 31.8 kilometers from Shinkaichi.

== Station layout ==
The station consists of a ground-level side platform serving a single bi-directional track. The station is unattended.

== Adjacent stations ==
«	Service	»
Shintetsu Ao Line
Kashiyama	Express	Ono
Kashiyama	Semi-Express	Ono
Kashiyama	Local	Ono

== History ==
Ichiba Station opened on December 28, 1951 as Dentetsu Ichiba Station (電鉄市場駅) . It was renamed April 1, 1988.

== Passenger statistics ==
In fiscal 2019, the station was used by an average of 100 passengers daily.

== See also ==
- List of railway stations in Japan
