= Hiyodorigoe Station =

Railway station in Kobe, Japan

Hiyodorigoe 鵯越駅
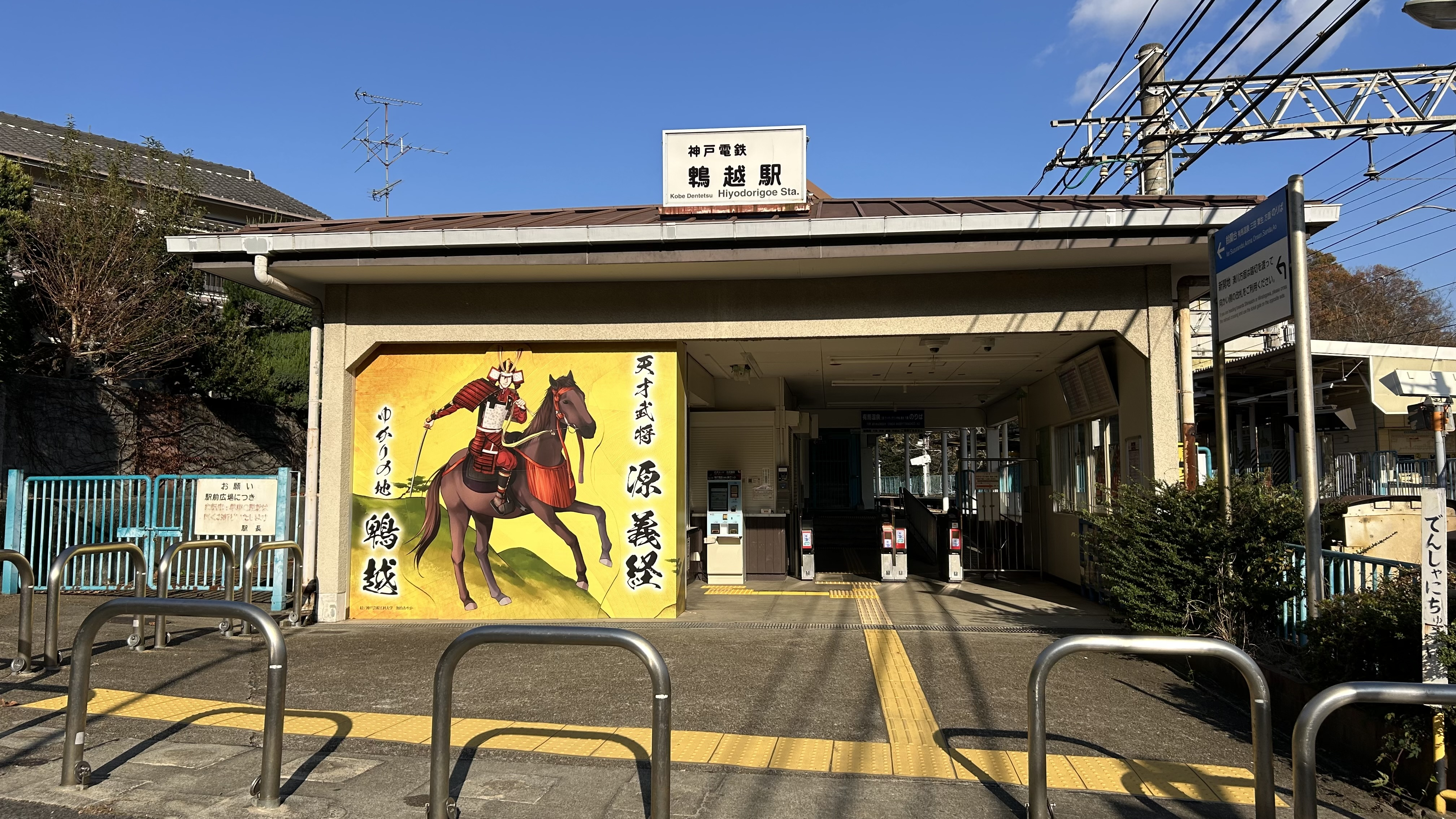
- Station building

General information
- Location: 651-3, Satoyama-chō; Hyōgo-ku, Kobe; Hyōgo: Japan; （神戸市兵庫区里山町651-3）
- Coordinates: 34°41′33.5″N 135°8′31.66″E
- System: Kobe Electric Railway commuter rail station
- Owner: Kobe Electric Railway
- Operator: Kobe Electric Railway
- Line: Arima Line
- Distance: 4.0 km (2.5 miles) from Shinkaichi; 3.6 km (2.2 miles) from Minatogawa
- Platforms: 2 side platform
- Tracks: 2
- Train operators: Kobe Electric Railway

Construction
- Structure type: At grade
- Accessible: None

Other information
- Station code: KB05
- Website: Official website

History
- Opened: 28 November 1928

Passengers
- 2018: 523 daily
Location

Hiyodorigoe Station (鵯越駅, Hiyodorigoe-eki) is a railway station in Hyogo-ku, Kobe, Hyōgo Prefecture, Japan.

== Lines ==
- Kobe Electric Railway
  - Arima Line

== Adjacent stations ==
«	Service	»
Shintetsu Arima Line
Maruyama (KB04)	Local	Suzurandai (KB06)
Semi-Express: Does not stop at this station
Express: Does not stop at this station
Rapid Express: Does not stop at this station
Special Rapid Express: Does not stop at this station
