= Aina Station =

Railway station in Kobe, Japan

Aina Station 藍那駅
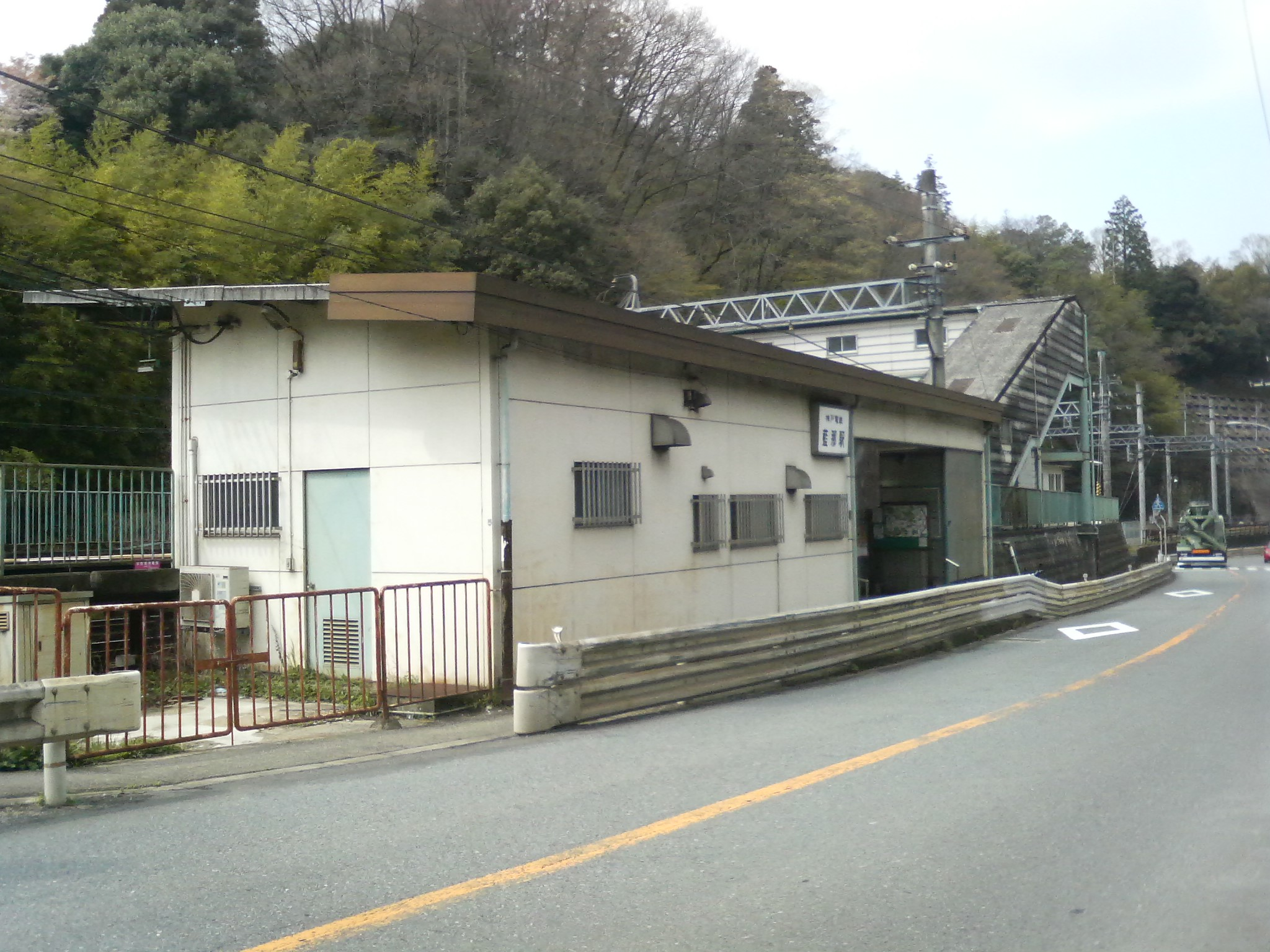
- Aina Station building

General information
- Location: 26-2, Yamada-cho Aina Aza Shimizu, Kita, Kobe, Hyōgo （神戸市北区山田町藍那字清水26-2） Japan
- Coordinates: 34°43′57″N 135°07′05″E
- Operator: Kobe Electric Railway
- Line: Ao Line
- Connections

History
- Opened: 1936
Location

Aina Station (藍那駅, Aina-eki) is a railway station in Kita-ku, Kobe, Hyōgo Prefecture, Japan.

== Lines ==
- Kobe Electric Railway
  - Ao Line

== Adjacent stations ==
«	Service	»
Shintetsu Ao Line
Nishi-Suzurandai	Local	Kizu
Nishi-Suzurandai	Semi-Express	Kizu
Express (running only for Shinkaichi): Does not stop at this station
Rapid Express: Does not stop at this station
