= Shintetsu Ao Line =

Railway line in Hyogo prefecture, Japan

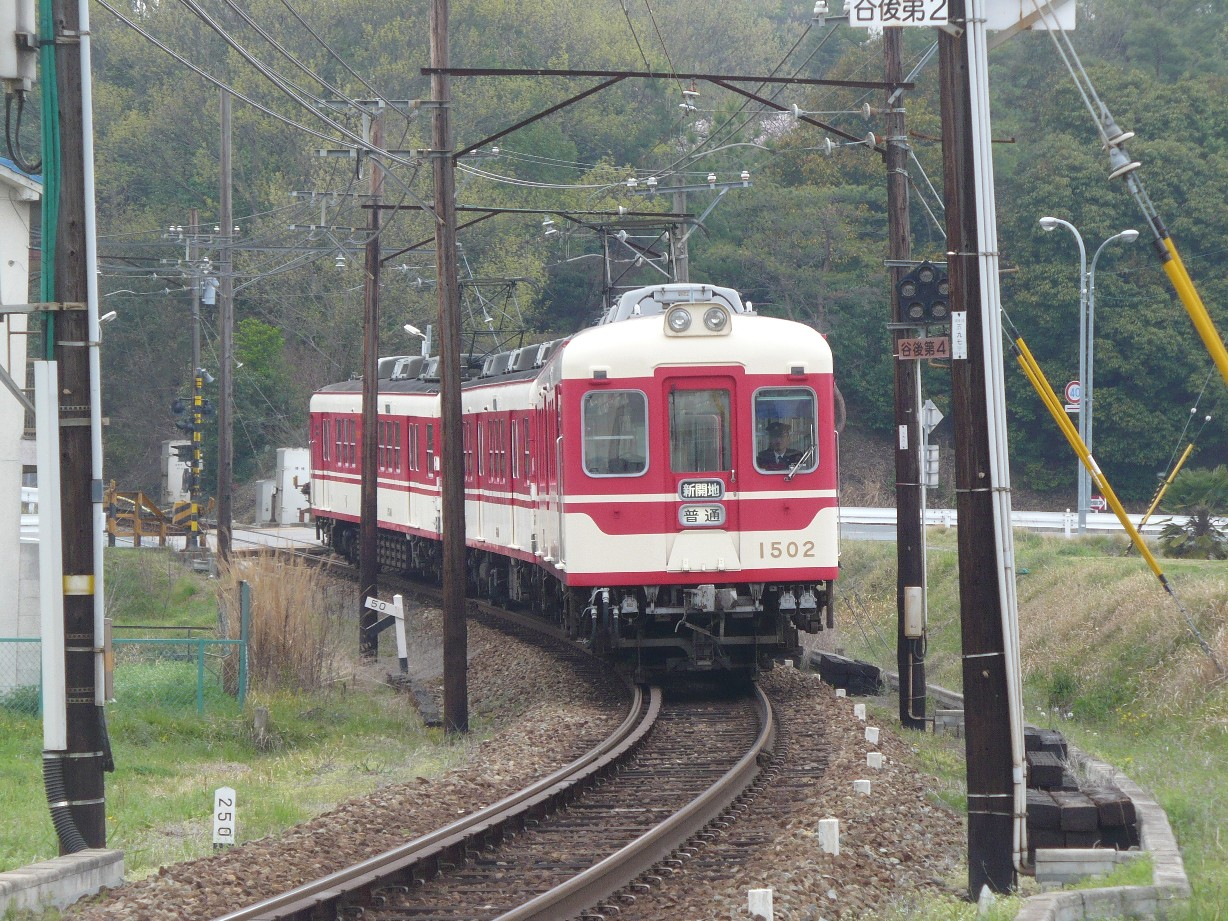
- 1500 series EMU on the 50 per mil gradient between Omura and Kashiyama, April 2011

Overview
- Native name: 粟生線
- Owner: Kobe Electric Railway
- Locale: Hyōgo Prefecture
- Termini: Suzurandai; Ao
- Stations: 20

Service
- Type: Heavy rail

History
- Opened: 28 December 1936; 89 years ago

Technical
- Line length: 29.2 km (18.1 mi)
- Track gauge: 1,067 mm (3 ft 6 in)
- Electrification: 1,500 V DC
- Operating speed: 70 km/h (45 mph)

The Ao Line (粟生線, Ao-sen) is a commuter railway line in Hyōgo Prefecture, Japan, operated by the Kobe Electric Railway (Shintetsu). It connects Kobe with its northwestern suburb, Ono. The line is 29.2 km (18.1 mi) long, extending from Suzurandai in Kita-ku to Ao, where the line connects with the West Japan Railway Company (JR West) Kakogawa Line, although all trains continue past Suzurandai to Shinkaichi via the Shintetsu Arima Line and Kobe Rapid Railway Namboku Line.

Between Suzurandai Station and Kizu Station, track gradient can reach 50‰ at most.

== History ==
The Miki Electric Railway Co. opened the Suzurandai – Hirono Golf-jo-mae on 28 December 1936. DMUs operated until the section was electrified the following year and extended to Miki Uenomaru, with the extension to Miki opening in 1938.

In 1947 the company merged with the Kobe Electric Railway Co., which extended the line to Ono on 28 December 1951, and from Ono to Ao on 10 April 1952.

The Nishi-Suzurandai – Aina section was duplicated in 1982, and the Kizu – Oshibedani section was duplicated between 1979 and 1989.

=== Former connecting lines ===
- Miki station – The Miki Railway Miki Line operated between 1917 and 2008.

== Stations ==
- S indicates that the service stops at the station
- | indicates that the service skips the station

No.	Station		Distance (km)	Local (普通)	Semi-Express (準急)	Express (急行)	Transfers	Location
↑ Through Service via the Shintetsu Arima Line and Kobe Kosoku Line to/from Shinkaichi ↑
KB06	Suzurandai	鈴蘭台	0.0	S	S	S	Arima Line (Through Service)	Kita-ku, Kobe
KB41	Suzurandai-nishiguchi	鈴蘭台西口	0.8	S	S	S		Kita-ku, Kobe
KB42	Nishi-Suzurandai	西鈴蘭台	1.3	S	S	S		Kita-ku, Kobe
KB43	Aina	藍那	3.0	S	S	↑		Kita-ku, Kobe
KB44	Kizu	木津	6.4	S	S	↑		Nishi-ku, Kobe
KB45	Kobata	木幡	8.1	S	S	S		Nishi-ku, Kobe
KB46	Sakae	栄	9.6	S	S	S		Nishi-ku, Kobe
KB47	Oshibedani	押部谷	11.2	S	S	S		Nishi-ku, Kobe
KB48	Midorigaoka	緑が丘	12.8	S	S	S		Miki
KB49	Hirono Golf-jo-mae	広野ゴルフ場前	13.5	S	S	S		Miki
KB50	Shijimi	志染	15.6	S	S	S		Miki
KB51	Ebisu	恵比須	17.6	S	S	S		Miki
KB52	Miki Uenomaru	三木上の丸	18.6	S	S	S		Miki
KB53	Miki	三木	19.3	S	S	S		Miki
KB54	Omura	大村	20.8	S	S	S		Miki
KB55	Kashiyama	樫山	23.2	S	S	S		Ono
KB56	Ichiba	市場	23.9	S	S	S		Ono
KB57	Ono	小野	26.2	S	S	S		Ono
KB58	Hata	葉多	27.7	S	S	S		Ono
KB59	Ao	粟生	29.2	S	S	S	Kakogawa Line; Hojo Railway Hojo Line	Ono
