= Suzurandai-nishiguchi Station =

Railway station in Kobe, Japan

Suzurandai-nishiguchi Station 鈴蘭台西口駅
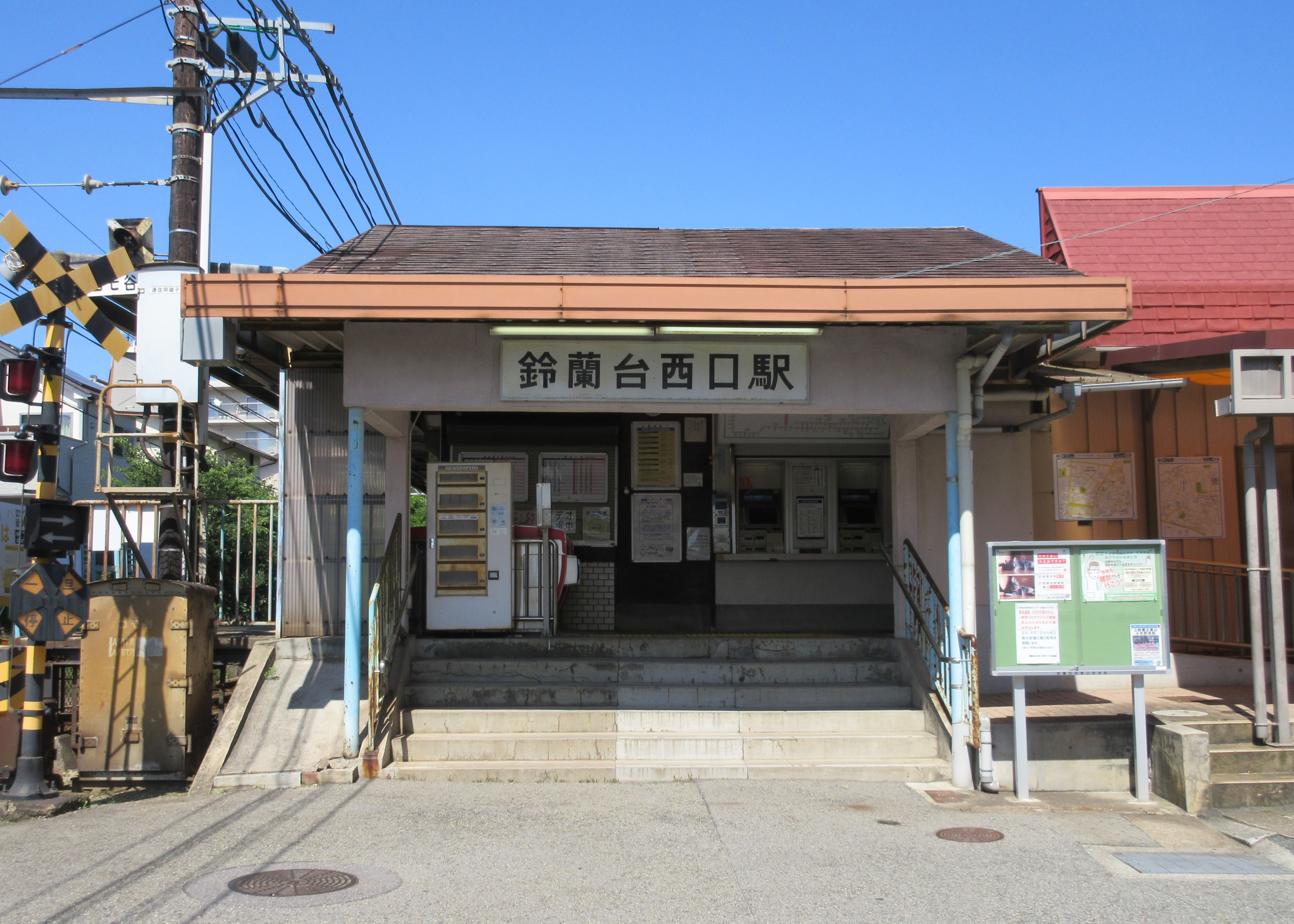
- Suzurandai-nishiguchi, June 2020

General information
- Location: 12-15, Suzurandaiminamimachi 3-chome, Kita, Kobe, Hyōgo （神戸市北区鈴蘭台南町三丁目12-15） Japan
- Coordinates: 34°43′35.12″N 135°8′26.56″E
- Owner: Kobe Electric Railway
- Operator: Kobe Electric Railway
- Line: Ao Line
- Platforms: 1
- Tracks: 1

Other information
- Station code: KB41

History
- Opened: 1937
- Former names: Suzuran Dancehall mae (1937 - 1942); Obunishiguchi (1942 - 1962) (until 1962)
Location

Suzurandai-nishiguchi Station (鈴蘭台西口駅, Suzurandai-nishiguchi-eki) is a railway station in Kita-ku, Kobe, Hyōgo Prefecture, Japan.

== Lines ==
- Kobe Electric Railway
  - Ao Line

== Adjacent stations ==
«	Service	»
Shintetsu Ao Line
Suzurandai (KB06)	Local	Nishi-Suzurandai (KB42)
Suzurandai (KB06)	Semi-Express	Nishi-Suzurandai (KB42)
Suzurandai (KB06)	Express (running only for Shinkaichi)	Nishi-Suzurandai (KB42)
Suzurandai (KB06)	Rapid Express	Nishi-Suzurandai (KB42)
