= Nagata Station (Shintetsu) =

Railway station in Kobe, Japan

Coordinates: 34°40′54″N 135°08′58″E

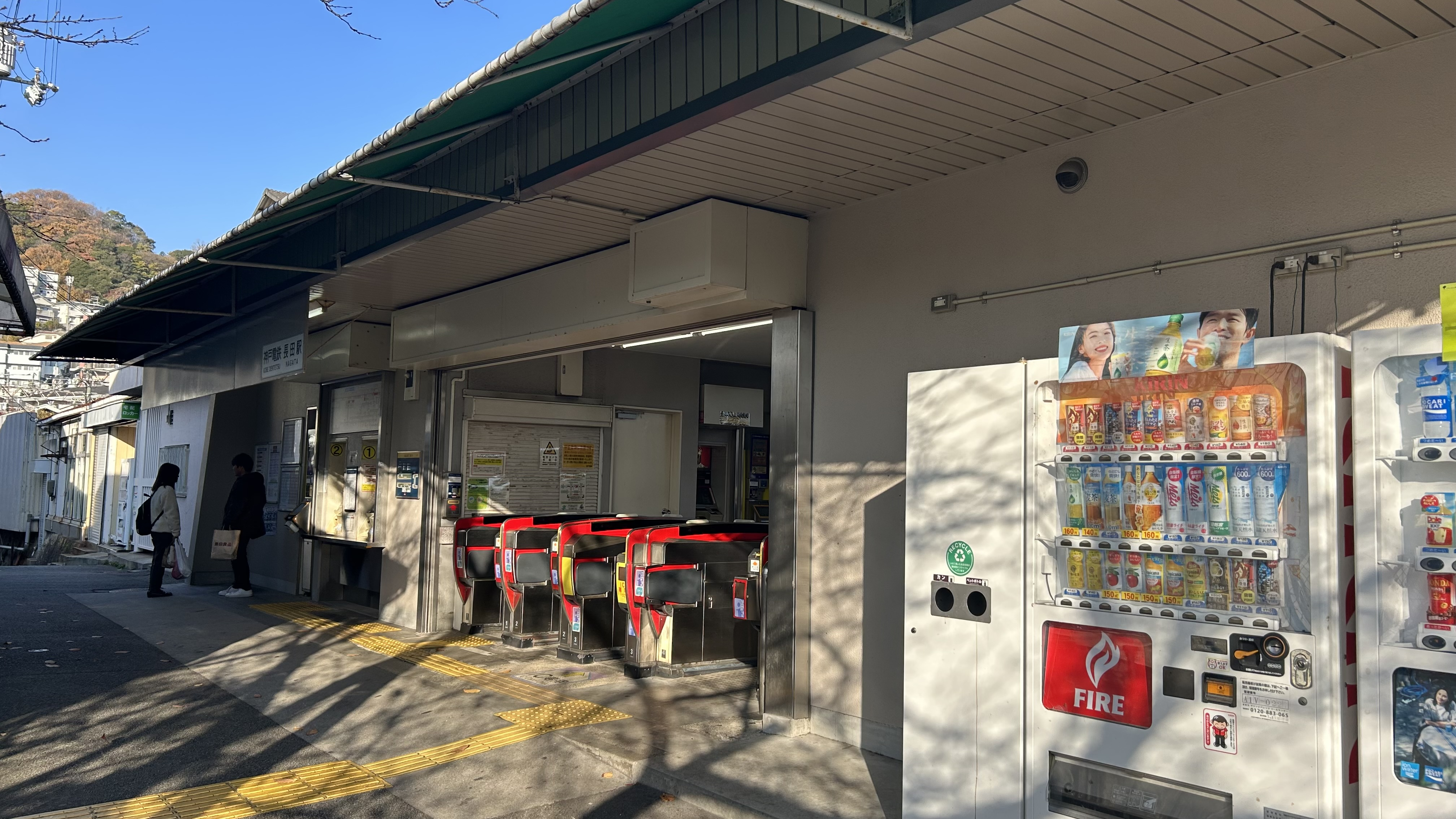
Shintetsu Nagata Station, taken in 2025.

Nagata Station (長田駅, Nagata-eki) is a railway station in Nagata-ku, Kobe, Hyōgo Prefecture, Japan.

== Lines ==
- Kobe Electric Railway
  - Arima Line

== Adjacent stations ==
«	Service	»
Shintetsu Arima Line
Minatogawa	Local	Maruyama
Minatogawa	Semi-Express	Suzurandai
Express: Does not stop at this station
Rapid Express: Does not stop at this station
Special Rapid Express: Does not stop at this station
