= Maruyama Station =

Maruyama Station (丸山駅) is the name of three train stations in Japan:

- Maruyama Station (Hyōgo)
- Maruyama Station (Mie)
- Maruyama Station (Saitama)
