= Sakae Station =

Sakae Station (栄駅) is the name of three train stations in Japan:

- Sakae Station (Hyōgo), on the Shintetsu Ao Line in Nishi-ku, Kobe
- Sakae Station (Nagoya), an underground metro station in Naka-ku
- Sakae Station (Okayama), on the Mizushima Main Line in Kurashiki
