= Ebisu Station =

Ebisu Station is the name of two Japanese railway stations.

- Ebisu Station (Tokyo) (恵比寿駅) in Shibuya, Tokyo
- Ebisu Station (Hyōgo) (恵比須駅) in Miki, Hyōgo
