= Kobata =

Kobata (written: 小畑 or 小幡) is a Japanese surname. Notable people with the surname include:

- Mako Kobata (小幡 真子, born 1990), Japanese volleyball player
- Minoru Kobata (小畑 穣, born 1946), Japanese footballer

== See also ==
- Kobata Station, a railway station in Kobe, Hyōgo Prefecture, Japan
