= Kobe Municipal Arboretum =

Botanical garden and arboretum in Kobe, Japan

Coordinates: 34°44′28″N 135°10′41″E

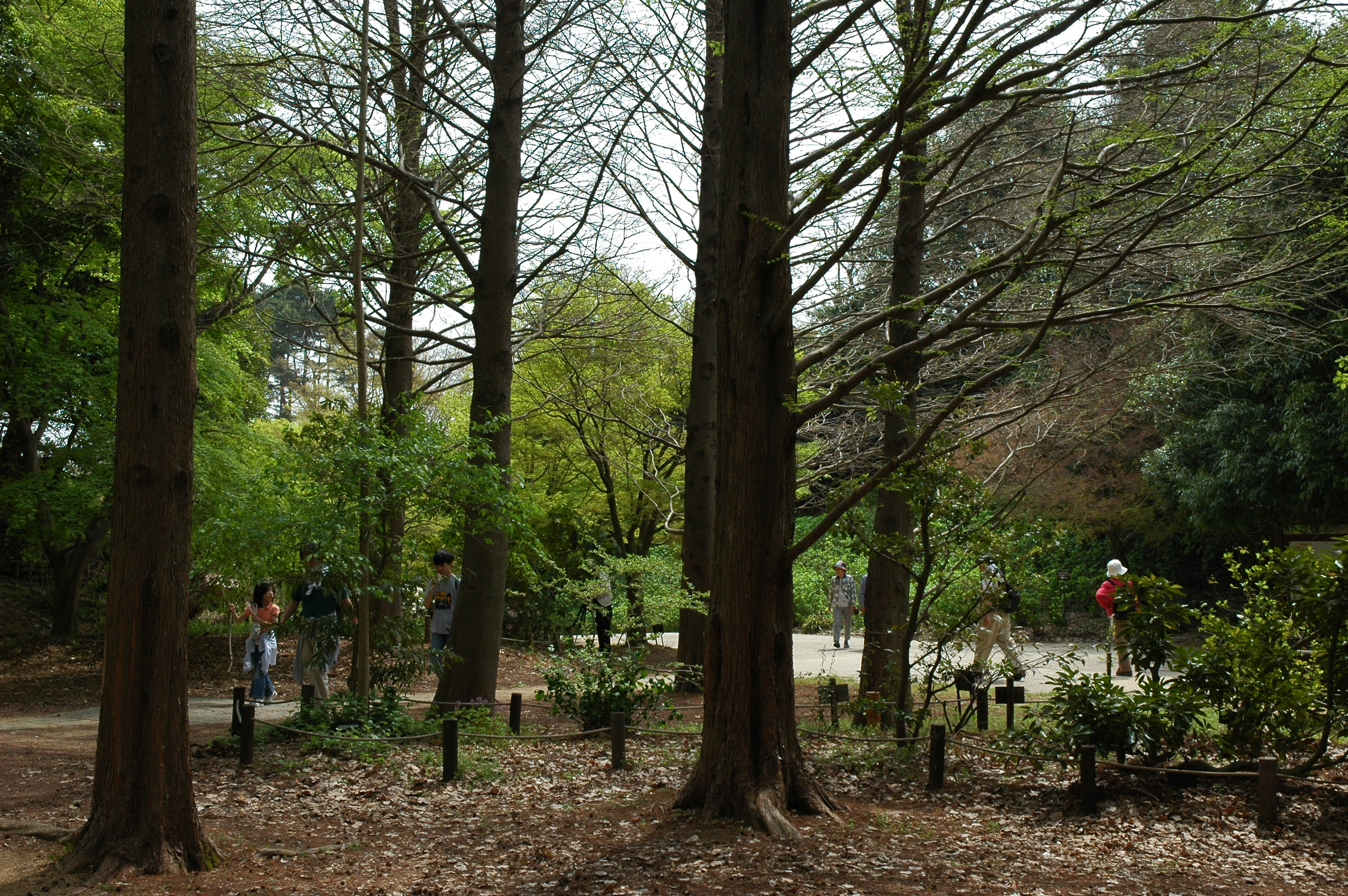
Kobe Municipal Arboretum

The Kobe Municipal Arboretum (神戸市立森林植物園, Kōbe Shiritsu Shinrin Shokubutsuen), also known as the Kobe City Forest Botanical Garden, is a 142.6-hectare botanical garden and arboretum located near Mount Maya at 4-1 Nakaichiri-yama, Shimotanigami, Yamada-cho, Kita-ku, Kobe, Japan. It is operated by the city and open daily except Wednesdays; an admission fee is charged.

The arboretum was established in 1940, and now contains approximately 1,200 kinds of trees and shrubs from Japan as well as other parts of Asia, Australasia, Europe, and North America, with good collections of cherry trees, conifers, hydrangea, and rhododendrons.

== See also ==
- Rokko Alpine Botanical Garden (nearby)
- List of botanical gardens in Japan
