= Maruyama Station (Hyōgo) =

Railway station in Kobe, Japan

Coordinates: 34°41′09″N 135°08′38″E

Maruyama Station (丸山駅, Maruyama-eki) is a railway station in Nagata-ku, Kobe, Hyōgo Prefecture, Japan.

== Lines ==
- Kobe Electric Railway
  - Arima Line

== Adjacent stations ==
| « | Service | » |
Shintetsu Arima Line
| Nagata | Local | Hiyodorigoe |
Semi-Express: Does not stop at this station
Express: Does not stop at this station
Rapid Express: Does not stop at this station
Special Rapid Express: Does not stop at this station
