= Shijimi Station =

Railway station in Miki, Hyōgo Prefecture, Japan

Shijimi Station 志染駅
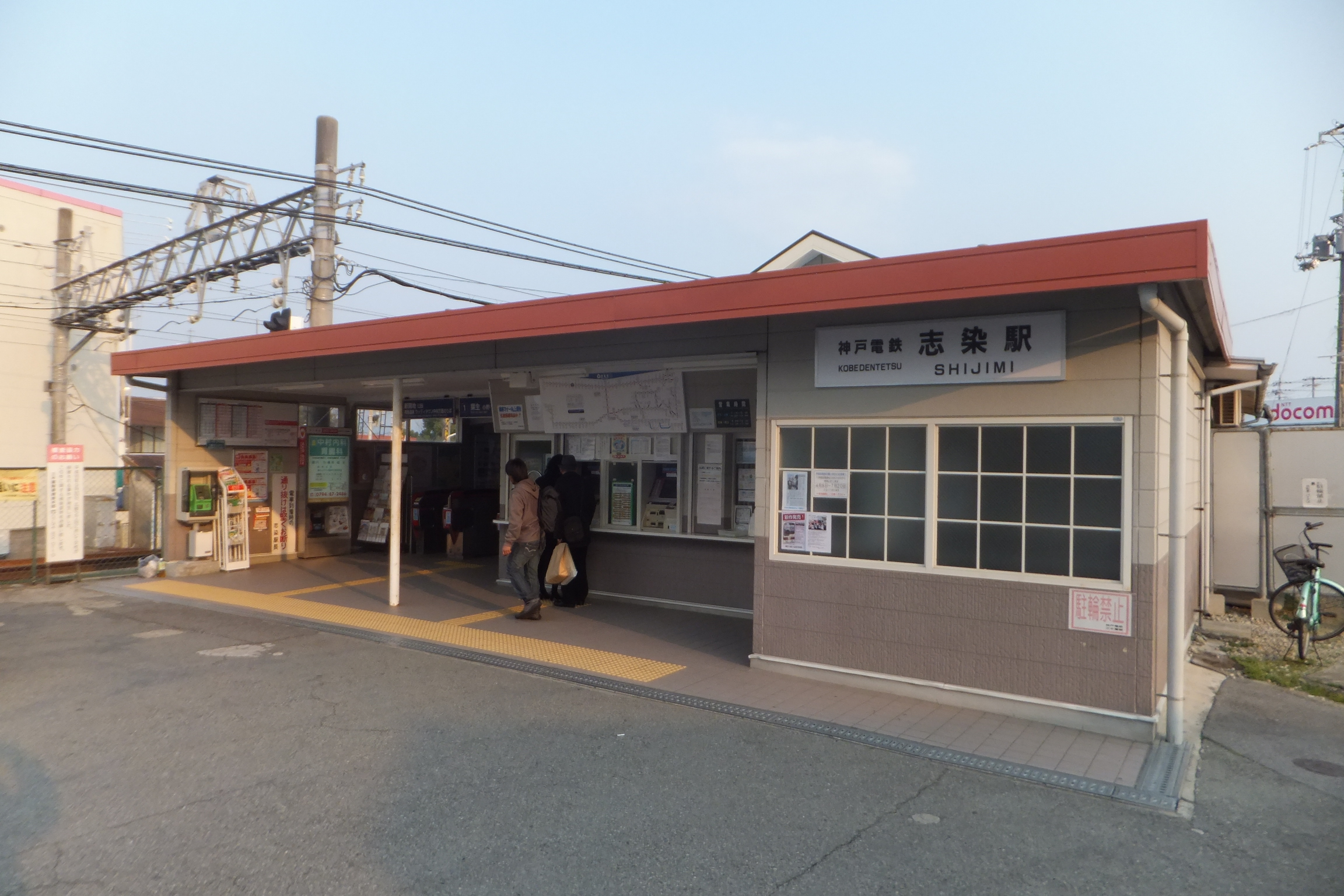
- Shijimi Station, March 2014

General information
- Location: 836, Shijimi-cho Nishijiyugaoka 1-chome, Miki-shi, Hyōgo-ken; Japan
- Coordinates: 34°46′56″N 135°00′28″E
- Operator: Kobe Electric Railway
- Line: ■ Ao Line
- Distance: 15.6 km from Suzurandai
- Platforms: 1 side + 1 island platform
- Connections

Other information
- Station code: KB50
- Website: Official website

History
- Opened: 28 December 1937

Passengers
- FY2019: 1836
Location
- Location within Hyōgo Prefecture Location within Japan

Shijimi Station (志染駅, Shijimi-eki) is a passenger railway station located in the city of Miki, Hyōgo Prefecture, Japan, operated by the private Kobe Electric Railway (Shintetsu).

== Lines ==
Shijimi Station is served by the Ao Line and is 15.6 kilometers from the terminus of the line at Suzurandai and is 23.1 kilometers from Minatogawa and 23.5 kilometers from Shinkaichi.

== Station layout ==
The station consists of a ground-level side platform and one ground-level island platform connected to the station building by a level crossing. The station is unattended.

=== Platforms ===
1	■ Ao Line	for Ono and Ao
2	■ Ao Line	for Shijimi, Minatogawa and Shinkaichi

== Adjacent stations ==
«	Service	»
Shintetsu Ao Line
Hirono Golf-jo-mae	Express	Ebisu
Hirono Golf-jo-mae	Semi-Express	Ebisu
Hirono Golf-jo-mae	Local	Ebisu

== History ==
Shijimi Station opened on December 28, 1937.

== Passenger statistics ==
In fiscal 2019, the station was used by an average of 1836 passengers daily.

== Surrounding area ==
- Hyogo Prefectural Miki Higashi High School
- Jiyugaoka Community Center
- Miki Sanyo Hospital

== See also ==
- List of railway stations in Japan
