= Nishi-Suzurandai Station =

Railway station in Kobe, Japan

Nishi-Suzurandai Station 西鈴蘭台駅
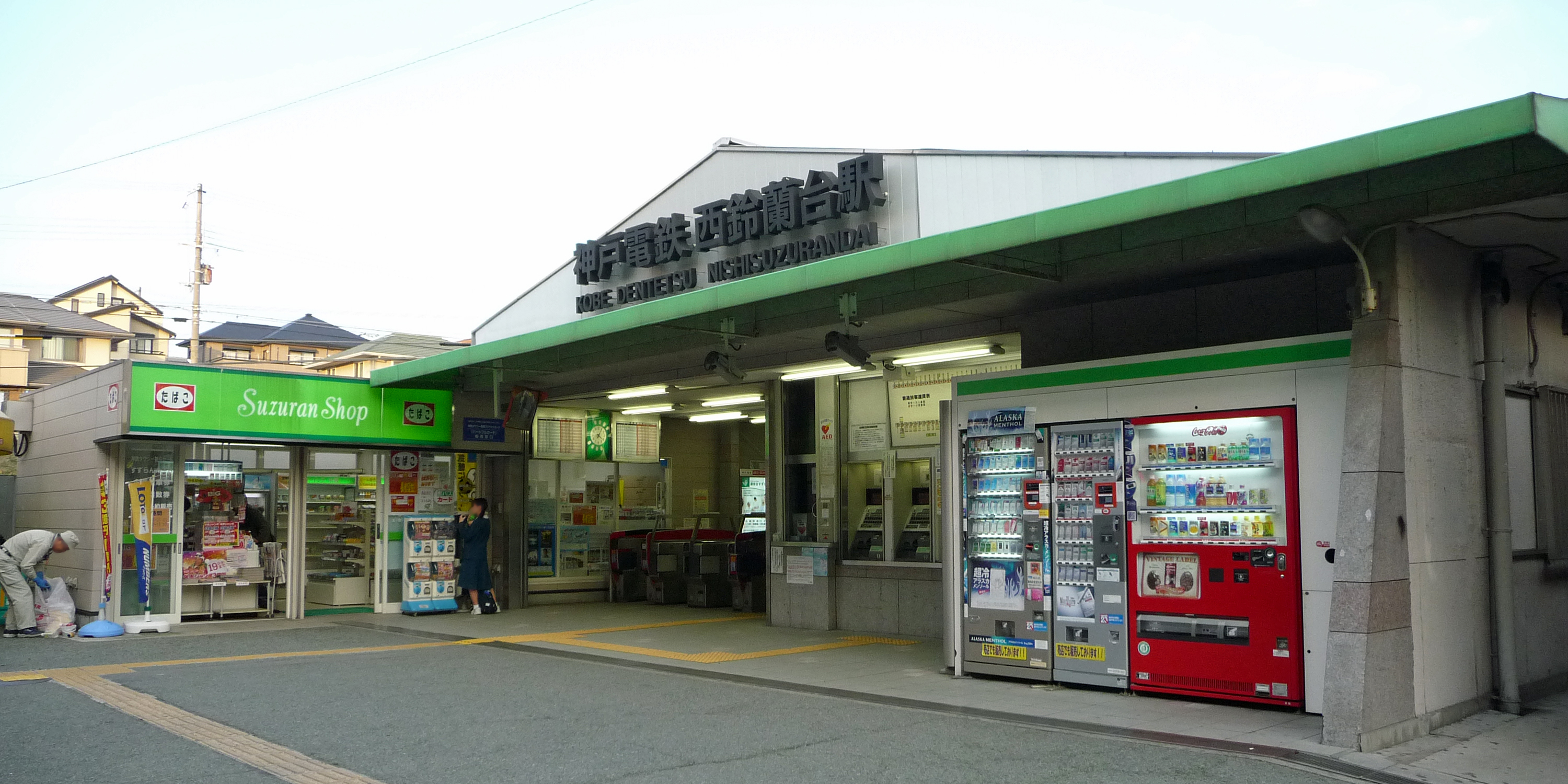
- Nishi-Suzurandai, January 2008

General information
- Location: 1-1, Kitagoyō 1-chome, Kobe, Hyōgo （神戸市北区北五葉一丁目1-1） Japan
- Coordinates: 34°43′32″N 135°08′07″E
- Operator: Kobe Electric Railway
- Line: Ao Line
- Connections: Bus terminal

History
- Opened: 1970

Passengers
- 2005: 5,995 daily
Location

Nishi-Suzurandai Station (西鈴蘭台駅, Nishi-Suzurandai-eki) is a railway station in Kita-ku, Kobe, Hyōgo Prefecture, Japan.

== Lines ==
- Kobe Electric Railway
  - Ao Line

== Adjacent stations ==
«	Service	»
Shintetsu Ao Line
Suzurandai-nishiguchi	Local	Aina
Suzurandai-nishiguchi	Semi-Express	Aina
Suzurandai-nishiguchi	Express (running only for Shinkaichi)	Kobata
Suzurandai-nishiguchi	Rapid Express	Oshibedani
