= Ebisu Station (Hyōgo) =

Railway station in Miki, Hyōgo Prefecture, Japan

Ebisu Station 恵比須駅
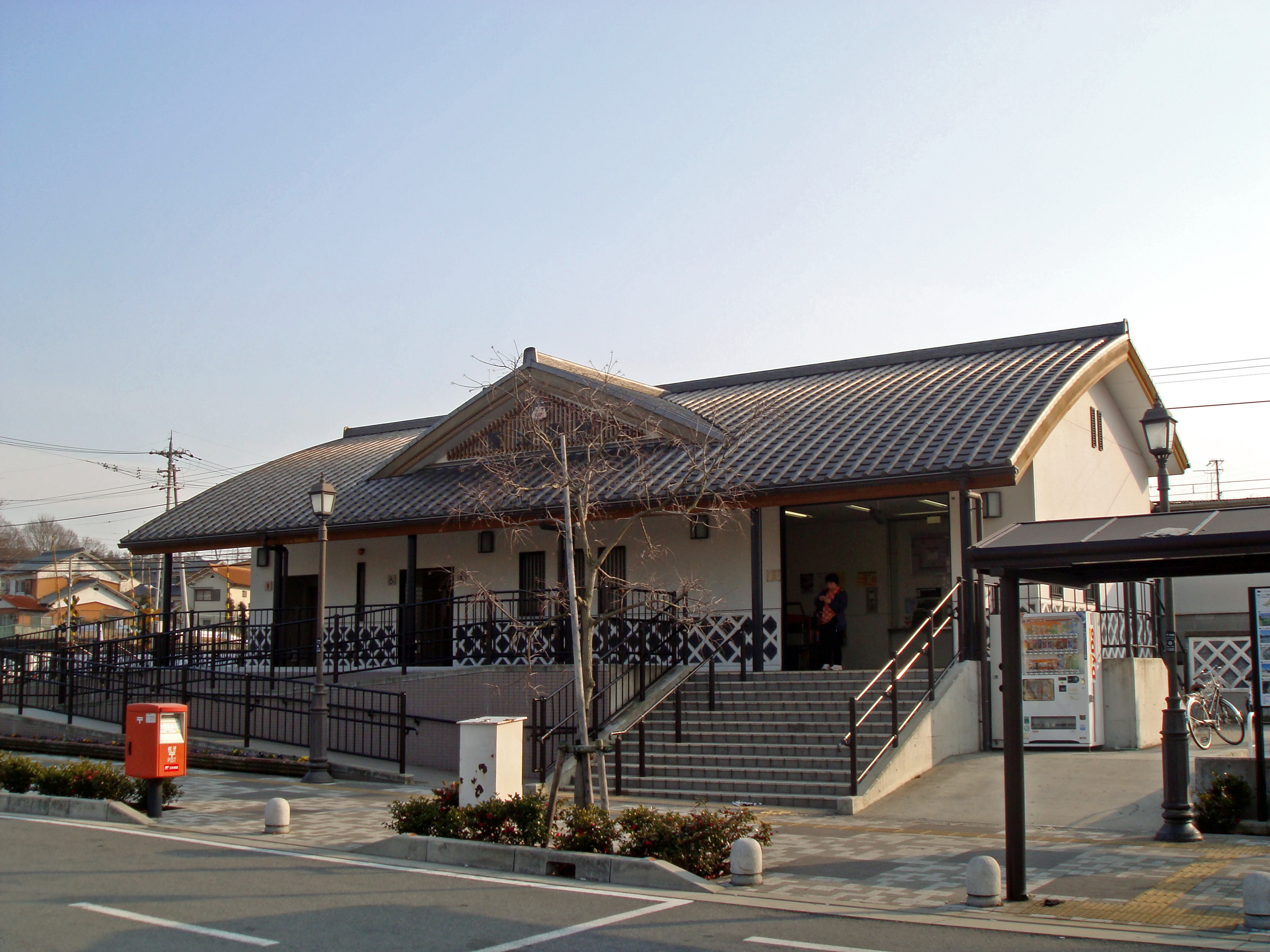
- Ebisu Station, 2008

General information
- Location: 1-56, Otsuka 2-chome, Miki-shi, Hyōgo-ken 673-0413; Japan
- Coordinates: 34°47′52″N 134°59′54″E
- Operator: Kobe Electric Railway
- Line: ■ Ao Line
- Distance: 17.6 km from Suzurandai
- Platforms: 1 side platform
- Connections

Other information
- Station code: KB51
- Website: Official website

History
- Opened: 28 December 1936
- Former names: Kurumi (until 1939)

Passengers
- FY2019: 622
Location
- Location within Hyōgo Prefecture Location within Japan

Ebisu Station (恵比須駅, Ebisu-eki) is a passenger railway station located in the city of Miki, Hyōgo Prefecture, Japan, operated by the private Kobe Electric Railway (Shintetsu).

== Lines ==
Ebisu Station is served by the Ao Line and is 17.6 kilometers from the terminus of the line at Suzurandai and is 25.1 kilometers from Minatogawa and 25.5 kilometers from Shinkaichi.

== Station layout ==
The station consists of a ground-level side platform serving a single bi-directional track. The station is unattended.

== Adjacent stations ==
«	Service	»
Shintetsu Ao Line
Shijimi	Express	Miki Uenomaru
Shijimi	Semi-Express	Miki Uenomaru
Shijimi	Local	Miki Uenomaru

== History ==
Ebisu Station opened on December 28, 1937 as Kurumi Station (久留美駅). It was renamed to its present name on April 1, 1939.

== Passenger statistics ==
In fiscal 2019, the station was used by an average of 622 passengers daily.

== Surrounding area ==
- Miki City Hall
- Miki Municipal Miki Elementary School
- Miki Municipal Miki Higashi Junior High Scho

== See also ==
- List of railway stations in Japan
