= Ono Station (Hyōgo) =

Railway station in Ono, Hyōgo Prefecture, Japan

Ono Station 小野駅
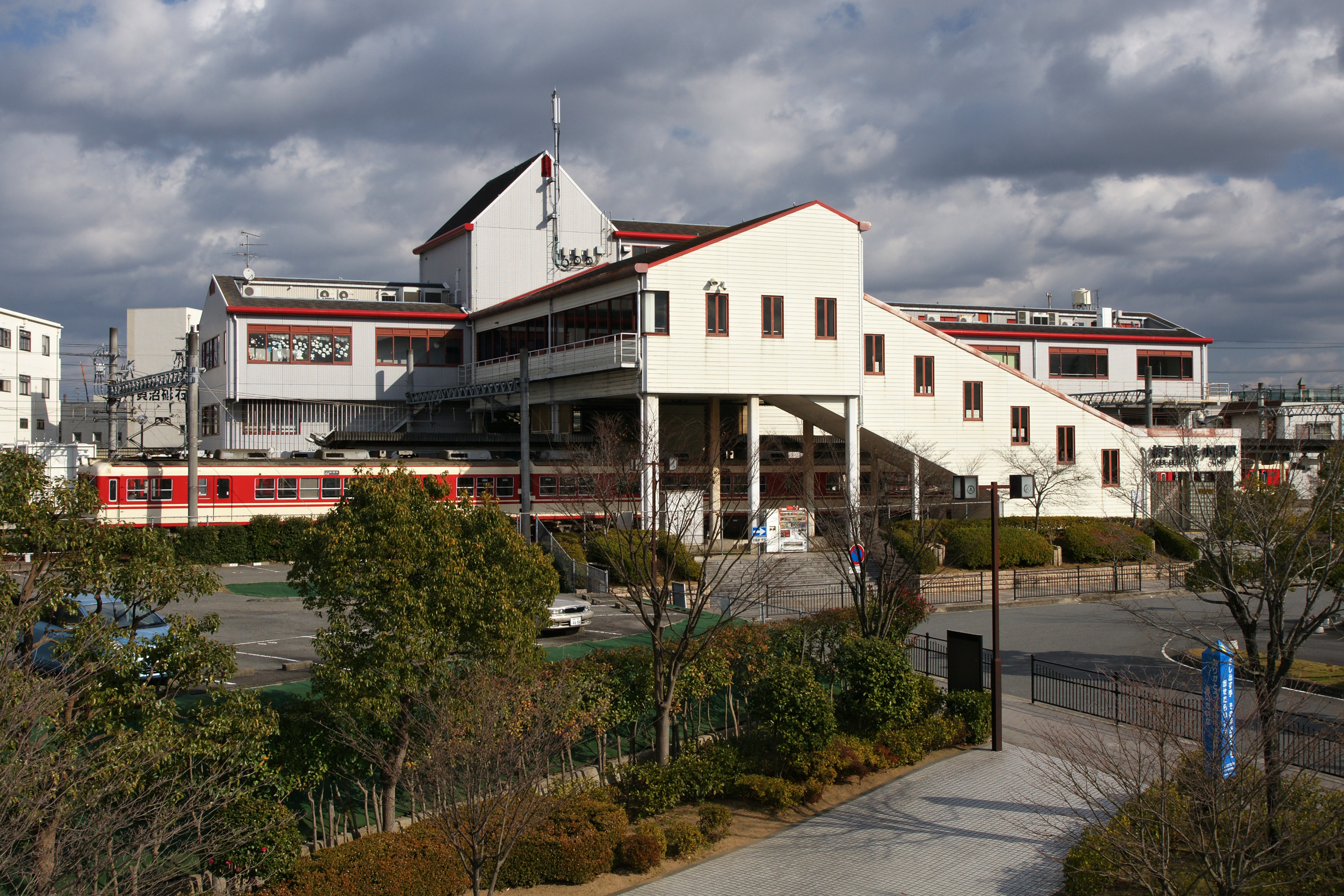
- Ono Station, December 2009

General information
- Location: 235-3, Shimmei-cho Aza Nishihataga, Ono-shi, Hyōgo-ken 675-1331; Japan
- Coordinates: 34°50′36″N 134°56′03″E
- Operator: Kobe Electric Railway
- Line: ■ Ao Line
- Distance: 26.2 km from Suzurandai
- Platforms: 2 island platforms
- Connections: Bus stop

Other information
- Station code: KB57
- Website: Official website

History
- Opened: 28 December 1951
- Former names: Dentetsu Ono (until 1988)

Passengers
- FY2019: 1753 daily
Location
- Location within Hyōgo Prefecture Location within Japan

Ono Station (小野駅, Ono-eki) is a passenger railway station located in the city of Ono, Hyōgo Prefecture, Japan, operated by the private Kobe Electric Railway (Shintetsu).

== Lines ==
Ono Station is served by the Ao Line and is 26.2 kilometers from the terminus of the line at Suzurandai and is 33.7 kilometers from Minatogawa and 34.1 kilometers from Shinkaichi.

== Station layout ==
The station consists of two ground-level island platforms connected by an elevated station building.

=== Platforms ===
1, 2	■ Ao Line	for Ao
3, 4	■ Ao Line	for Shijimi, Minatogawa and Shinkaichi

== Adjacent stations ==
«	Service	»
Shintetsu Ao Line
Ichiba	Express	Hata
Ichiba	Semi-Express	Hata
Ichiba	Local	Hata

== History ==
Ono Station opened on December 28, 1951, as Dentetsu Ono Station (電鉄小野駅). It was renamed to its present name on April 1, 1988. The current station building was completed in April 1991.

== Passenger statistics ==
In fiscal 2019, the station was used by an average of 1753 passengers daily.

== Surrounding area ==
- Ono Municipal Yoshikokan
- Hyogo Prefectural Ono High School
- Hyogo Prefectural Ono Technical High School
- Ono City Ono Junior High School
- Ono City Ono Elementary School

== See also ==
- List of railway stations in Japan
