= Kita-ku, Kobe =

Coordinates: 34°47′35″N 135°09′58″E

Kita-ku 北区 きたく
- Ward
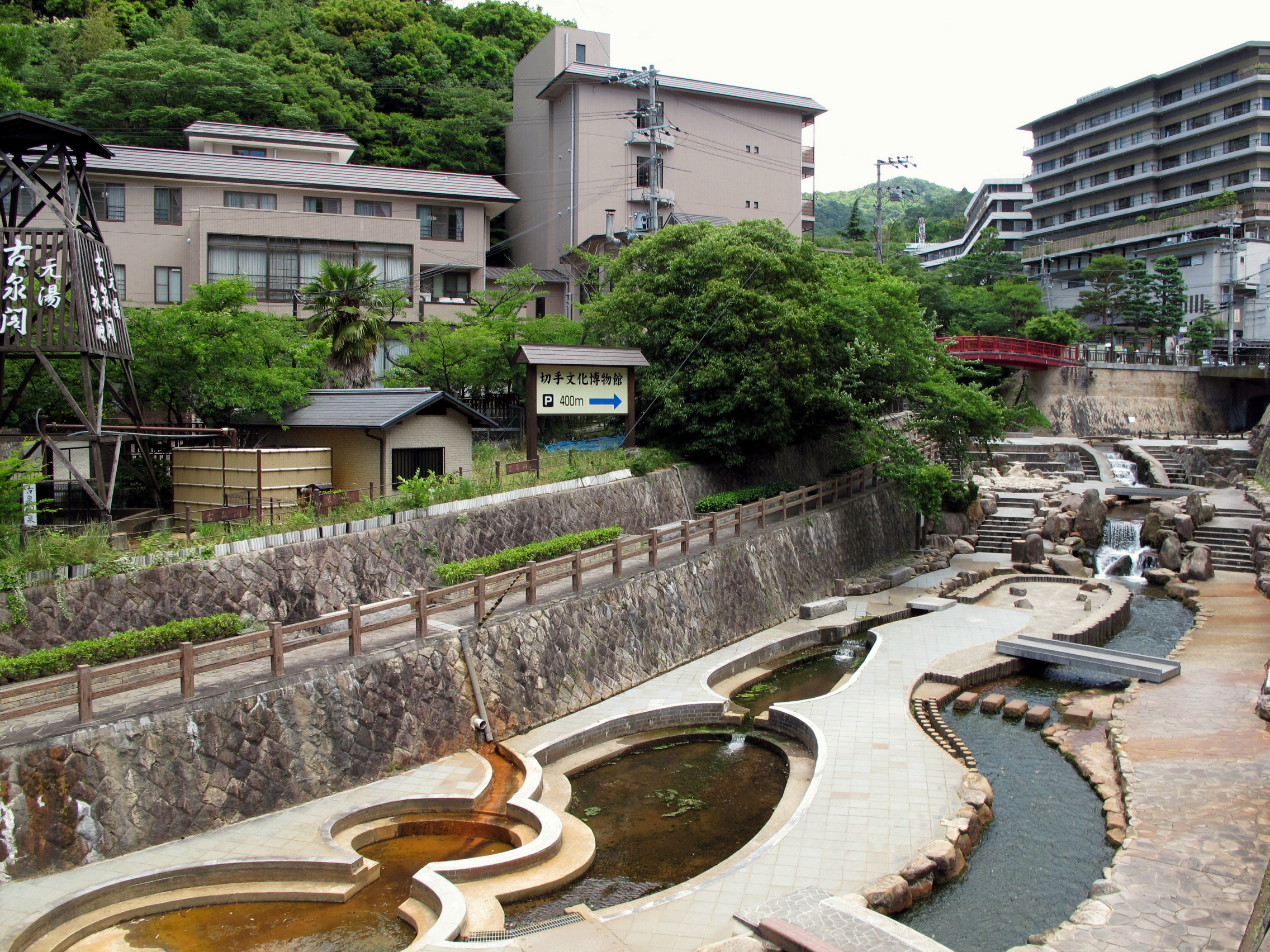
- Arima Onsen

- Location of Kita-ku, within Kobe
- Country: Japan
- List of regions of Japan: Kansai
- Prefecture: Hyōgo
- City: Kobe

Area
  - Total: 240.29 km^{2} (92.78 sq mi)

Population
  - Estimate (May 2024): 204,768

Kita (北区, Kita-ku) is one of 9 wards of Kobe, Japan. It has an area of 241.84 km^{2}, and a population of 226,402 (2008). Kita in Japanese means North. Kita-ku is the biggest ward in Kobe and occupies the northeastern part of the city. Arima Onsen is located in Kita-ku.

== Points of interest ==
- Kobe Municipal Arboretum
