= Nishi-ku, Kobe =

Ward of Kobe in Kansai, Japan

Coordinates: 34°42′N 135°00′E

Location of Nishi-ku in Kobe

Nishi (西区, Nishi-ku) is one of 9 wards of Kobe, Japan. It has an area of 137.86 km^{2}, and a population of 248,407 (2008). Nishi in Japanese means west. Nishi-ku occupies the northwestern part of the city.
