= Suzurandai Station =

Railway station in Kobe, Japan

Suzurandai 鈴蘭台駅
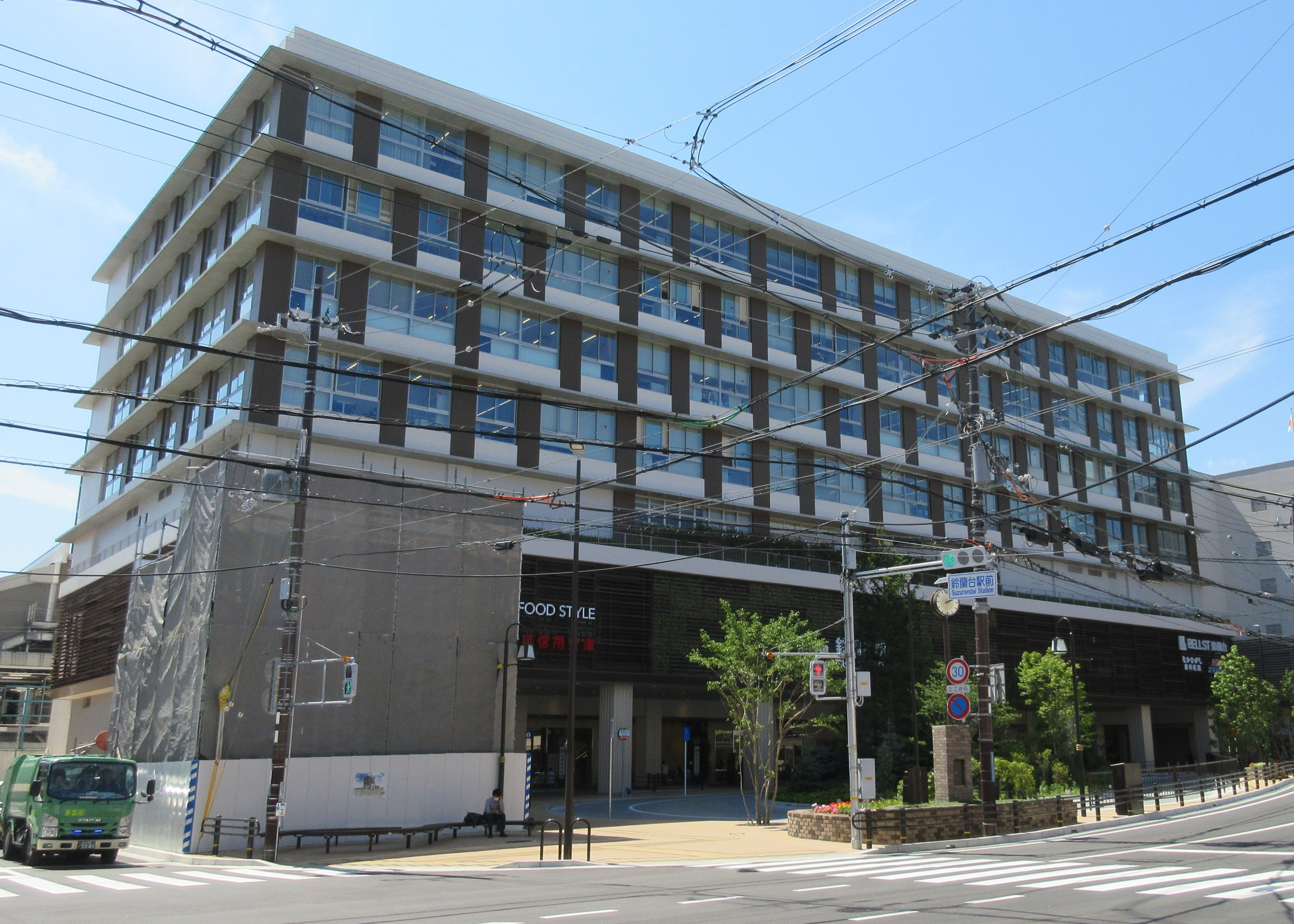
- Station building

General information
- Location: 7-17, Suzurandai-kitamachi 1-chōme, Kita-ku, Kobe; Hyōgo: Japan; （神戸市北区鈴蘭台北町一丁目7-17）
- Coordinates: 34°43′25.18″N 135°8′45.81″E
- System: Kobe Electric Railway commuter rail station
- Owner: Kobe Electric Railway
- Operator: Kobe Electric Railway
- Lines: Ao Line; Arima Line
- Distance: 7.9 km (4.9 miles) from Shinkaichi; 7.5 km (4.7 miles) from Minatogawa
- Platforms: 2 side platform
- Tracks: 4
- Train operators: Kobe Electric Railway
- Bus stands: yes

Construction
- Structure type: At grade
- Accessible: None

Other information
- Station code: KB06
- Website: Official website

History
- Opened: 28 November 1928
- Former names: Ōbu (1928 - 1932)

Passengers
- 2018: 9,644 daily
Location

Suzurandai Station (鈴蘭台駅, Suzurandai-eki) is a railway station in Kita-ku, Kobe, Hyōgo Prefecture, Japan.

== Lines ==
- Kobe Electric Railway
  - Ao Line
  - Arima Line

== Adjacent stations ==
«	Service	»
Shintetsu Arima Line
Hiyodorigoe (KB05)	Local	Kita-Suzurandai (KB07)
Nagata (KB03)	Semi-Express	Kita-Suzurandai
Minatogawa (KB02)	Express	Kita-Suzurandai
Minatogawa	Special Rapid Express (running only for Shinkaichi)	Kita-Suzurandai
Shintetsu Ao Line
Hiyodorigoe (KB05)	Local	Suzurandai-nishiguchi (KB41)
Nagata (KB03)	Semi-Express	Suzurandai-nishiguchi (KB41)
Minatogawa (KB02)	Express (running only for Shinkaichi)	Suzurandai-nishiguchi (KB41)
Minatogawa (KB02)	Rapid Express	Suzurandai-nishiguchi (KB41)
