= Minatogawa Station =

Railway station in Kobe, Japan

Coordinates: 34.6787908°N 135.1666188°E

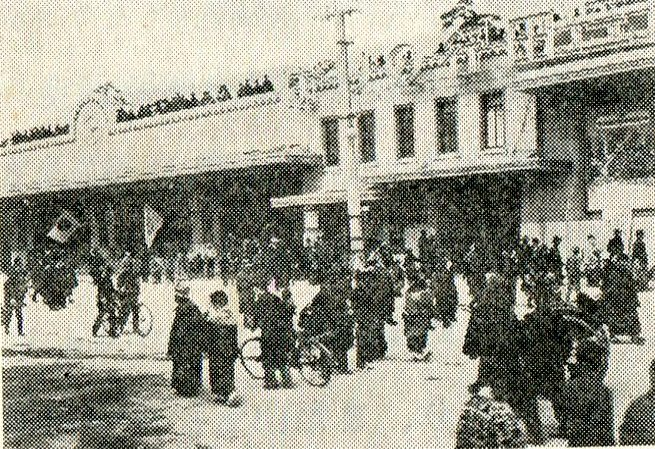
Minatogawa station in 1928

Minatogawa Station (湊川駅, Minatogawa-eki) is a railway station operated by Kobe Electric Railway Co., Ltd. in Hyogo-ku, Kobe, Hyōgo Prefecture, Japan.

== Lines ==
- Kobe Electric Railway
  - Arima Line, Kobe Kosoku Line

Kobe Rapid Transit Railway Co., Ltd. owns the tracks of the Shintetsu Kobe Kosoku Line as the Namboku Line of the Category-3 Railway Operator, and Shintetsu operates the trains on the line as Category-2 Railway Operator.

There is also a connection to the following line.

- Kobe Municipal Subway
  - Seishin-Yamate Line - Minatogawa-koen Station

=== Buse Routes ===
- Kobe City Bus: Minatogawa-koen-nishiguchi
- Kobe City Transportation Promotion Co. Yamate Route: Minatogawa-koen-higashiguchi

== Layout ==
This station has ticket gates on the 1st basement, and an island platform serving 2 tracks on the 2nd basement.

1	■ southbound	(Kobe Kosoku Line) to Shinkaichi
2	■ northbound	(Arima Line) for Arima Onsen and Sanda (Ao Line) for Ao, Ono and Miki

== Surroundings ==
- Minatogawa Park
- Hyogo Ward Office
- Hyogo Police Station
- Hyogo Fire Station

== Adjacent stations ==
«	Service	»
Shintetsu Arima Line, Kobe Kosoku Line
Shinkaichi (Kobe Kosoku Line)	Local	Nagata (Arima Line)
Shinkaichi (Kobe Kosoku Line)	Semi-Express	Nagata (Arima Line)
Shinkaichi (Kobe Kosoku Line)	Express	Suzurandai (Arima Line)
Shinkaichi (Kobe Kosoku Line)	Rapid Express	Suzurandai (Arima Line)
Shinkaichi (Kobe Kosoku Line)	Special Rapid Express for Shinkaichi	Suzurandai (Arima Line)
