= Shinkaichi Station =

Railway station in Kobe, Japan

Shinkaichi 新開地駅
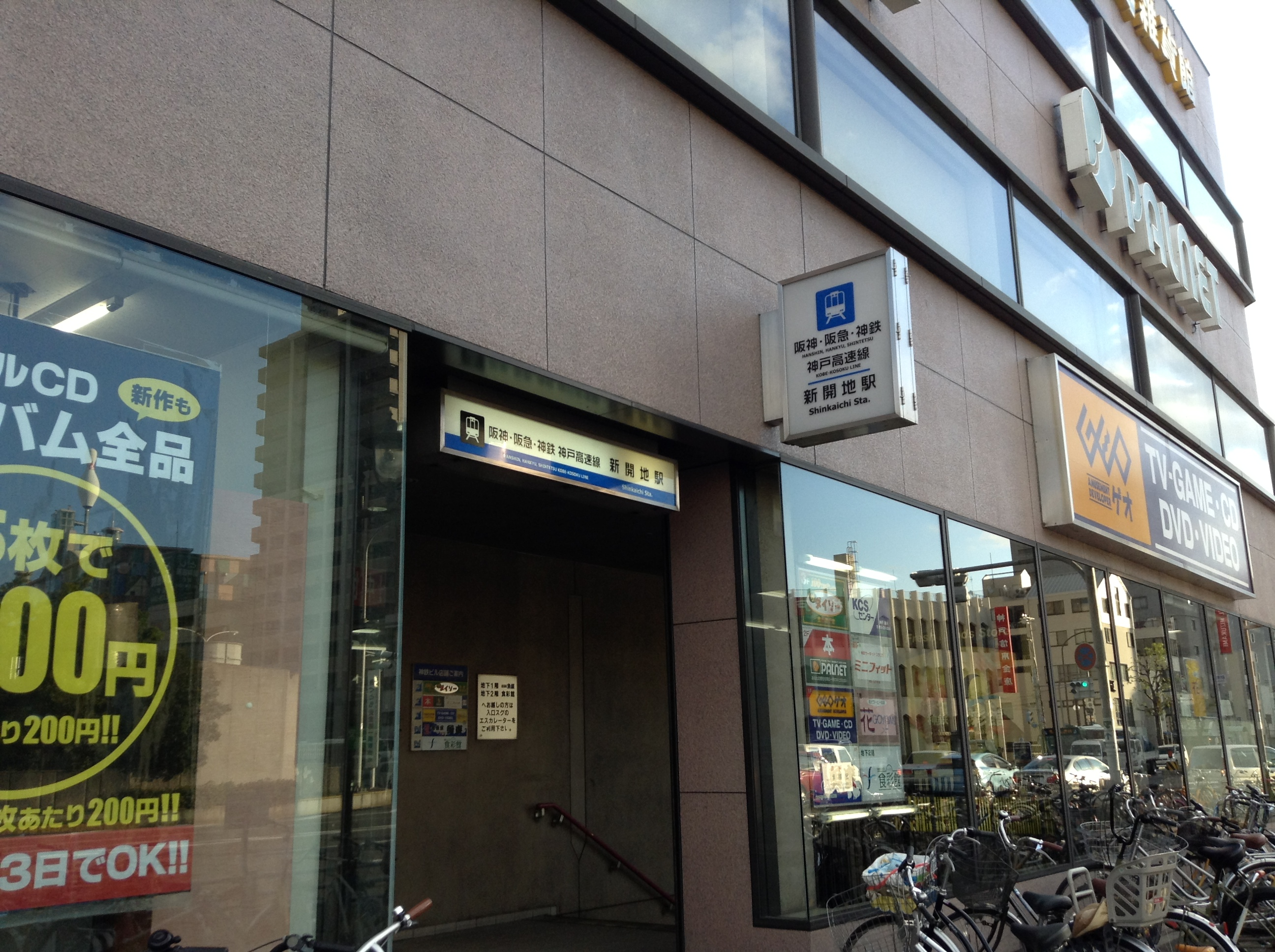
- Station entrance

General information
- Tracks: 3 (Hanshin, Hankyu); 3 (Shintetsu)
Location

Shinkaichi Station (新開地駅, Shinkaichi-eki; station numbers: HS 36 (Hanshin, Hankyu), KB 01 (Shintetsu)) is a railway station operated by Hanshin Electric Railway Co., Ltd., Hankyu Corporation and Kobe Electric Railway Co., Ltd. in the district of Shinkaichi, Hyogo-ku, Kobe opened on April 7, 1968.

Kobe Rapid Transit Railway Co., Ltd. owns the railway lines, and Hanshin, Hankyu and Shintetsu operate trains running on the lines.

Shinkaichi was originally at the heart of Kobe, but Kobe's central business district has shifted towards Sannomiya.

All 3 railway lines that stop at this station are named Kobe Kosoku Line.

== Lines ==
Shinkaichi is served by the following railway lines and stations:

- Hanshin Railway Kōbe Kosoku Line (Tozai Line)
- Hankyū Railway Kōbe Kosoku Line (Tozai Line)
- Kobe Electric Railway Kōbe Kosoku Line (Namboku Line)

Shinkaichi Station 新開地駅
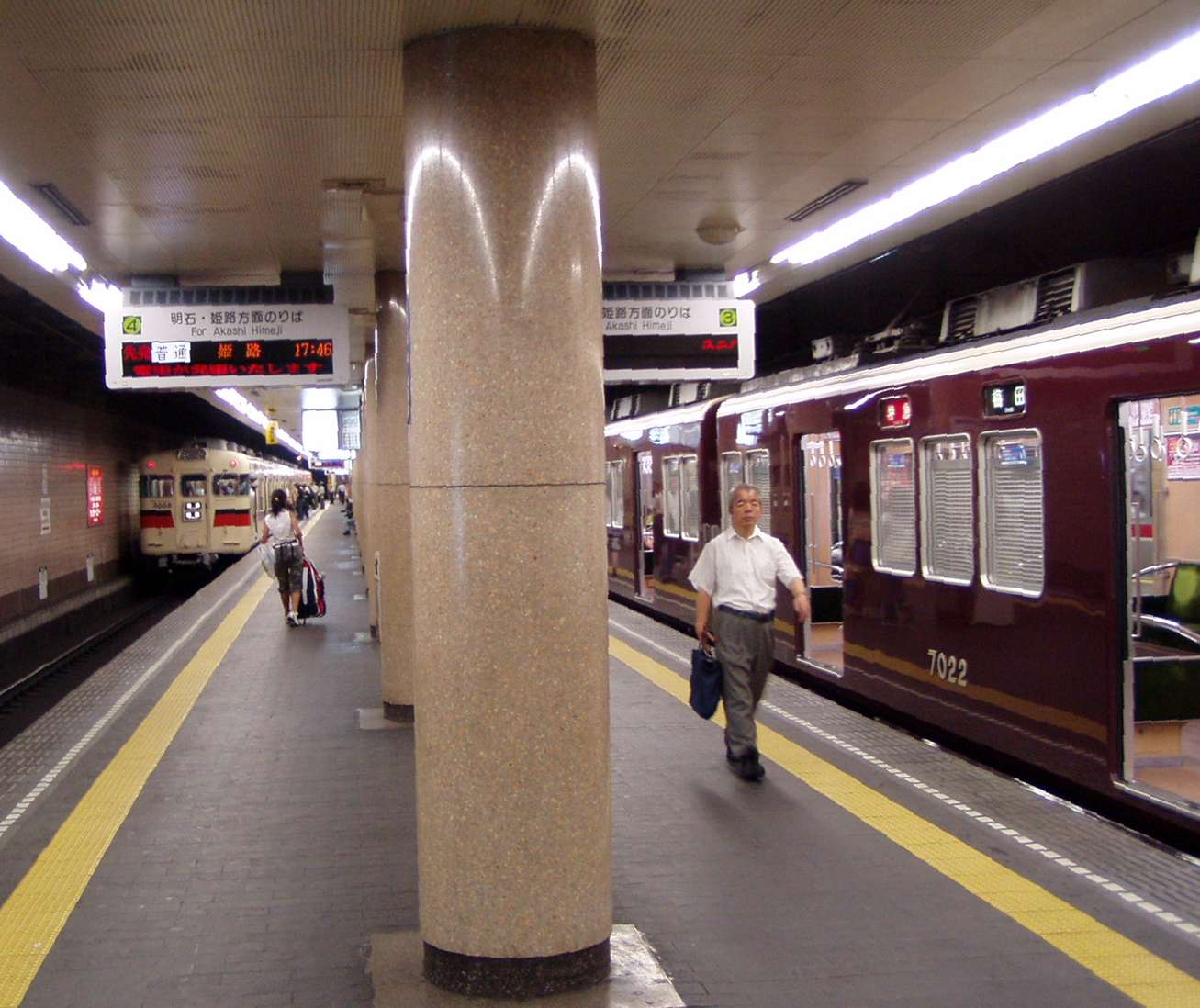

General information
- Location: 1-8, Onoe-dōri Hatchōme, Chūō-ku, Kobe, Hyōgo Prefecture; Japan
- Coordinates: 34°40′33.53″N 135°10′9.44″E
- System: Hanshin Railway station
- Operator: Hanshin Electric Railway
- Line: Tozai Line (Kobe)
- Platforms: 2 island platforms
- Tracks: 4

Construction
- Structure type: Underground

Other information
- Station code: HS 36

History
- Opened: 7 April 1968
Services
Hanshin Railway Kobe Kosoku Line (HS 36)
Kosoku Kobe (HS 35)	Hanshin Local	Daikai (HS 37)
Kosoku Kobe (HS 35)	Sanyo Local	Daikai (HS 37)
Kosoku Kobe (HS 35)	Rapid Express (3 starting trains only, on weekends and holidays)	Terminus
Kosoku Kobe (HS 35)	Hanshin Limited Express	Daikai (HS 37)
Kosoku Kobe (HS 35)	Limited Express (yellow marking)	Daikai (HS 37)
Kosoku Kobe (HS 35)	S Limited Express	Daikai (HS 37)
Kosoku Kobe (HS 35)	Limited Express (red marking)	Kosoku Nagata (HS 38)
Hankyu Railway Kobe Kosoku Line (HS 36)
Kosoku Kobe (HS 35)	Hankyu Local	Terminus
Kosoku Kobe (HS 35)	Sanyo Local	Daikai (HS 37)
Kosoku Kobe (HS 35)	Express (terminating only)	Terminus
Kosoku Kobe (HS 35)	Rapid Express	Terminus
Kosoku Kobe (HS 35)	Hankyu Limited Express; Hankyu Morning Commutation Limited Express	Terminus
Location

== Tozai Line (Hanshin, Hankyu) ==
=== Overview ===
Shinkaichi is the terminus for Hankyu services originating at Umeda Station as well as for select through services from the Kintetsu Nara Line. Services to and from the Sanyo Electric Railway Main Line and the Hanshin Main Line continue in either direction.

Select trains from the Sanyo Main Line continue instead to the Hankyu platforms at Kobe-Sannomiya Station.

=== Layout ===
There are two island platforms with three tracks on the second basement.

1	■ ■Kobe Kosoku Line	for Kosoku Kobe, Kobe Sannomiya, Osaka (Umeda, Namba), Nara, Takarazuka and Kyoto (mainly trains from Sanyo Suma)
2	■ ■Kobe Kosoku Line	for Kosoku Kobe, Kobe Sannomiya, Osaka (Umeda, Namba), Nara, Takarazuka and Kyoto (mainly the Hankyu Line, Hanshin Namba Line rapid express trains)
3	■ Kobe Kosoku Line	for Suma, Akashi and Himeji (mainly for getting off the trains terminating at Shinkaichi)
4	■ Kobe Kosoku Line	for Suma, Akashi and Himeji

Track diagram

=== Gallery ===
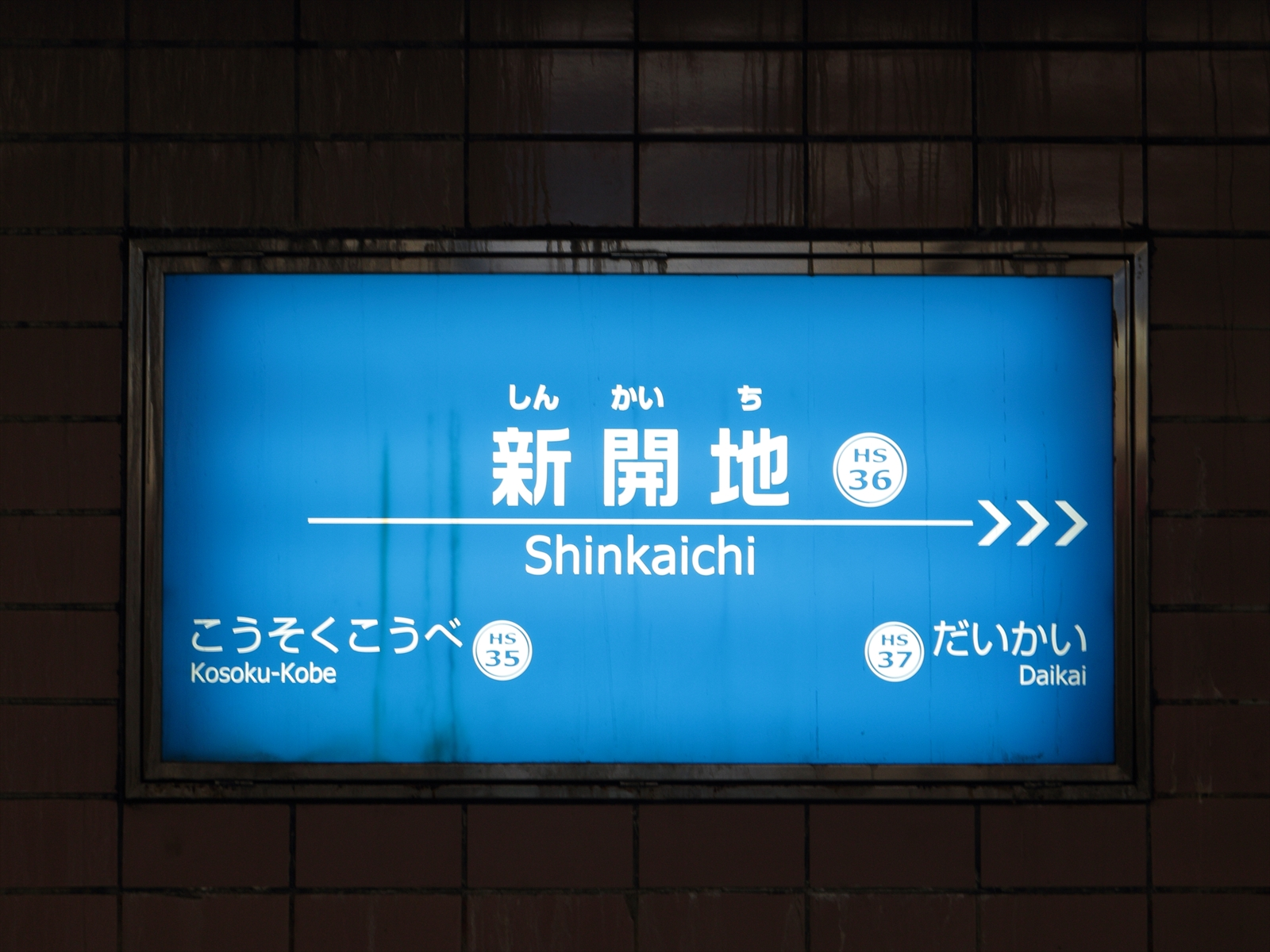
Station name board

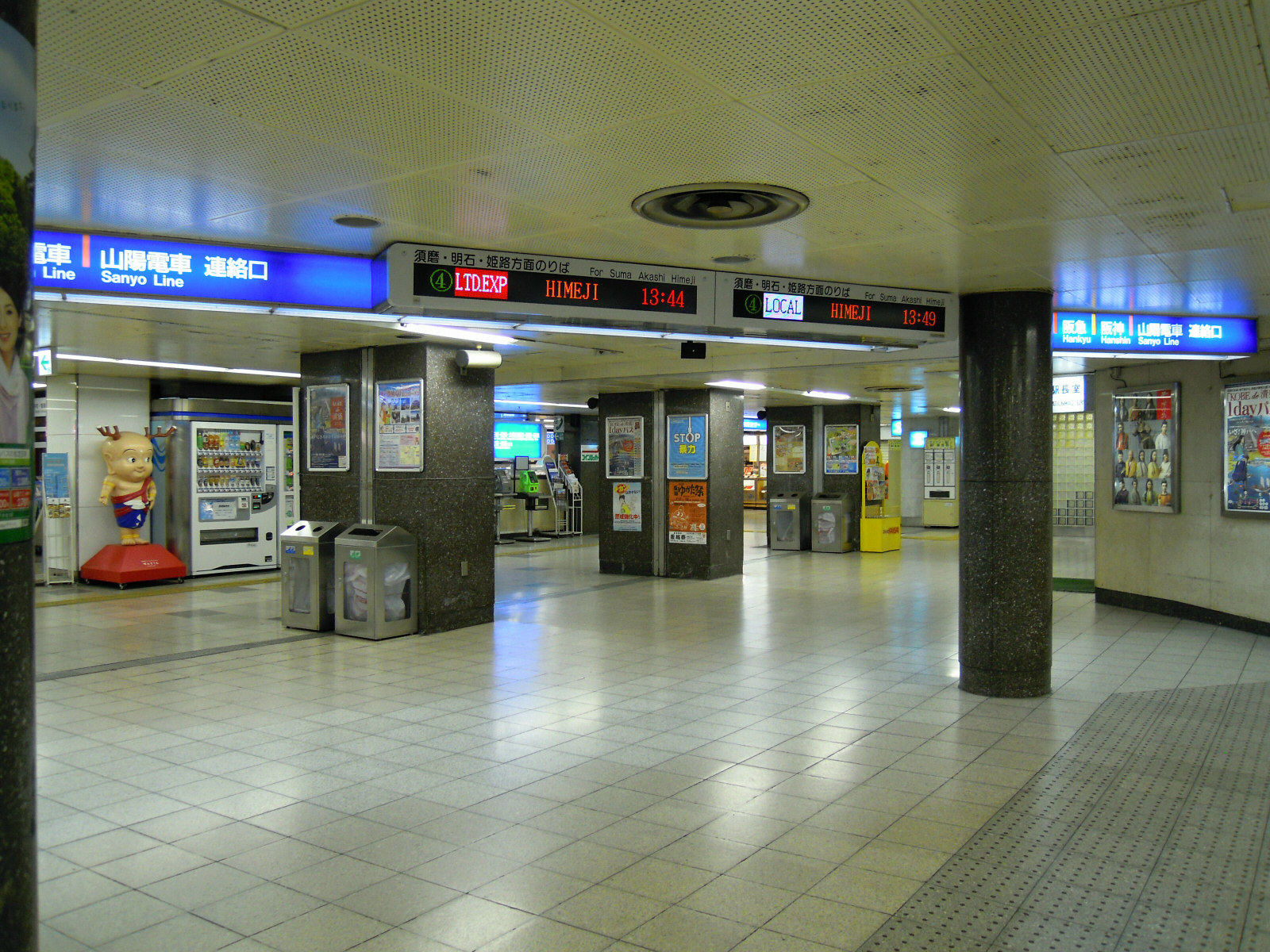
Tozai Line platform concourse

Shinkaichi Station 新開地駅
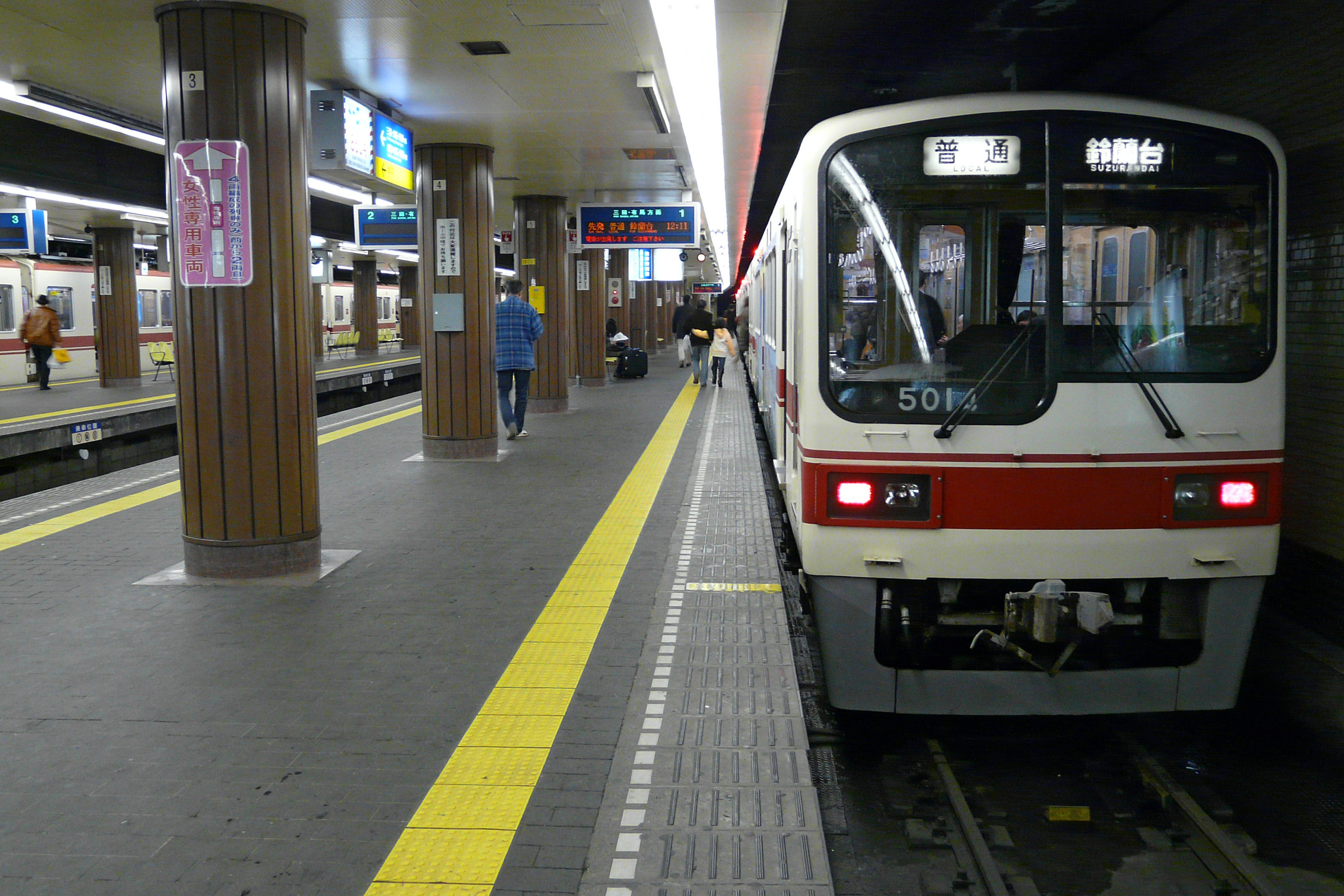

General information
- Location: 1-8, Onoe-dōri Hatchōme, Chūō-ku, Kobe, Hyōgo Prefecture; Japan
- Coordinates: 34°40′33.53″N 135°10′9.44″E
- System: Shintetsu Railway station
- Operator: Kobe Electric Railway
- Line: Kobe Electric Railway
- Platforms: 4 bay platforms
- Tracks: 3
- Connections: Tozai Line

Construction
- Structure type: Underground

Other information
- Station code: KB 01

History
- Opened: 1968
Services
Kobe Electric Railway Kobe Kosoku Line (KB 01)
Terminus	Local	Minatogawa (KB 02)
Terminus	Semi-Express	Minatogawa (KB 02)
Terminus	Express	Minatogawa (KB 02)
Terminus	Rapid Express	Minatogawa (KB 02)
Terminus	Special Rapid Express (terminating only)	Minatogawa (KB 02)
Location

== Namboku Line (Shintetsu) ==
=== Overview ===
Shinkaichi is the southern terminus for all services on the Kobe Electric Railway.

=== Layout ===
There are two dead-end platforms with three tracks on the first basement.

1, 2	■ Arima Line, Sanda Line	for Tanigami, Arima Onsen and Sanda
3, 4	■ Ao Line	for Miki, Ono and Ao

=== Gallery ===
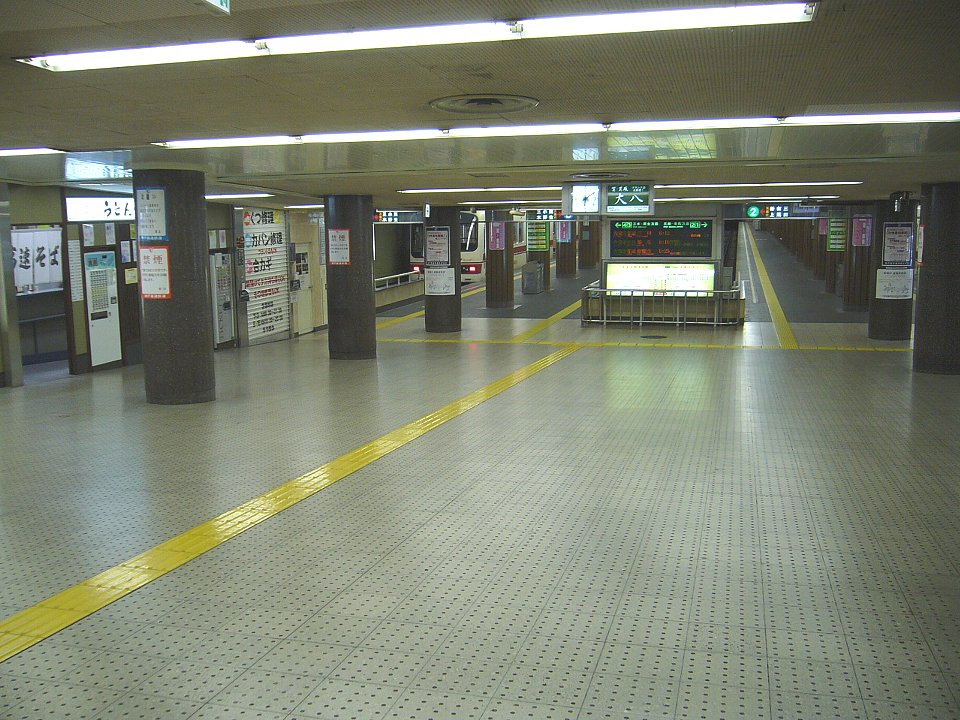
Shintetsu platform concourse

== History ==
The station opened on 7 April 1968 for all Tozai Line and Namboku line services.

Damage to the station was caused by the Great Hanshin earthquake in 1995. Restoration work on the Tozai Line took six months to complete.

Station numbering was introduced on 1 April 2014.
