= Kobe Electric Railway =

Railway company in Kobe, Japan

The company logo

The Kobe Electric Railway Co., Ltd. (神戸電鉄株式会社, Kōbe Dentetsu kabushiki gaisha), often called Shintetsu (神鉄), is a Japanese private railway company in Kobe and surrounding cities. It is a subsidiary of Hankyu Hanshin Toho Group.

== Lines ==
Map of the Kobe Electric Railway network

- Arima Line (Minatogawa - Arima Onsen)
- Sanda Line (Arimaguchi - Sanda)
- Kōen-Toshi Line (Yokoyama - Woody Town Chuo)
- Ao Line (Suzurandai - Ao)
- Kobe Kosoku Line (Shinkaichi - Minatogawa) - Kobe Rapid Transit Railway owns the tracks of the line as the "Namboku Line". Shintetsu operates trains on the line.

== Rolling stock ==
- 1000 series
- 1100 series
- 1300 series
- 1500 series
- 2000 series
- 3000 series
- 5000 series
- 6000 series
- 6500 series (from spring 2016)
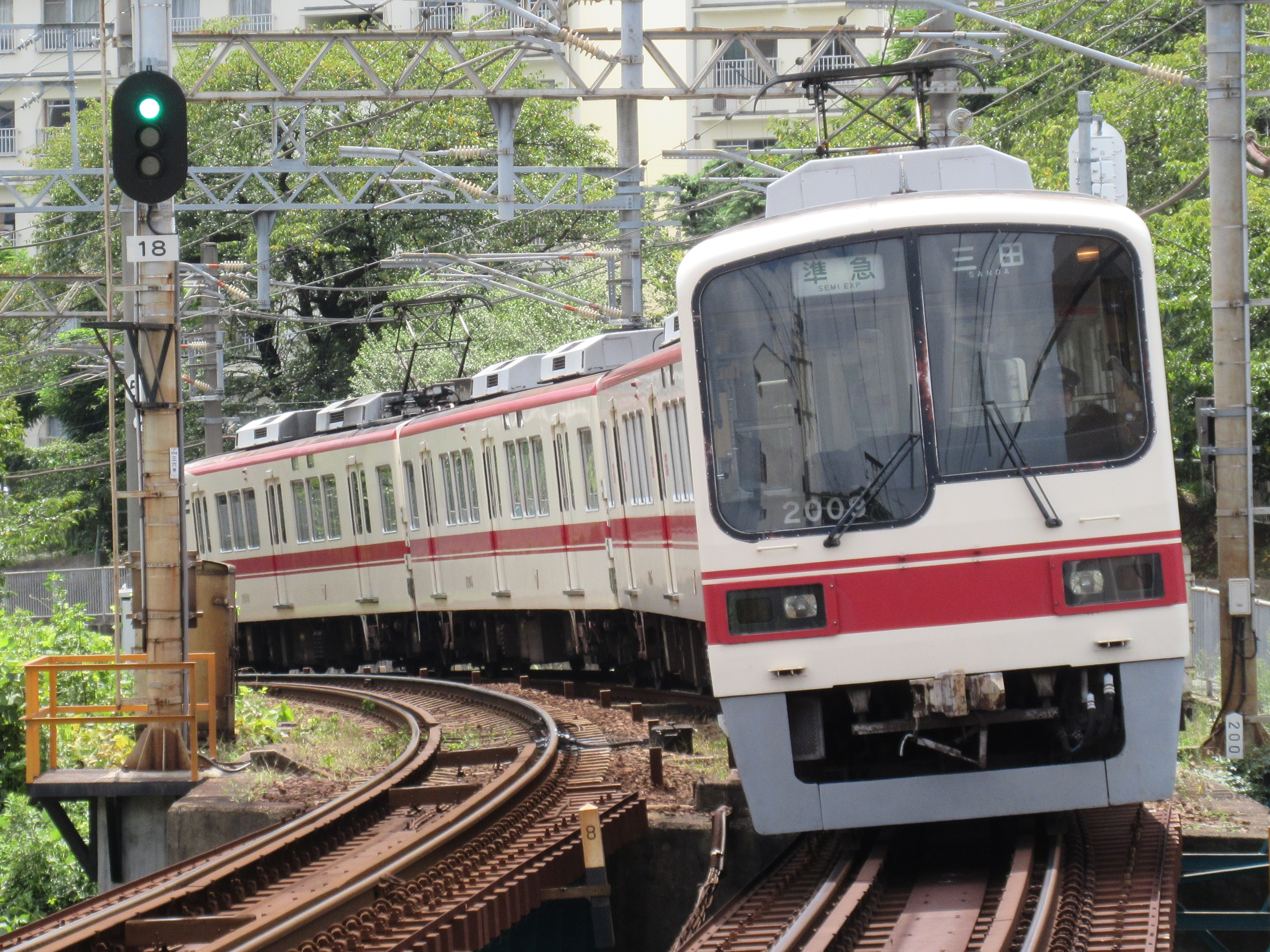
A 2000 series EMU

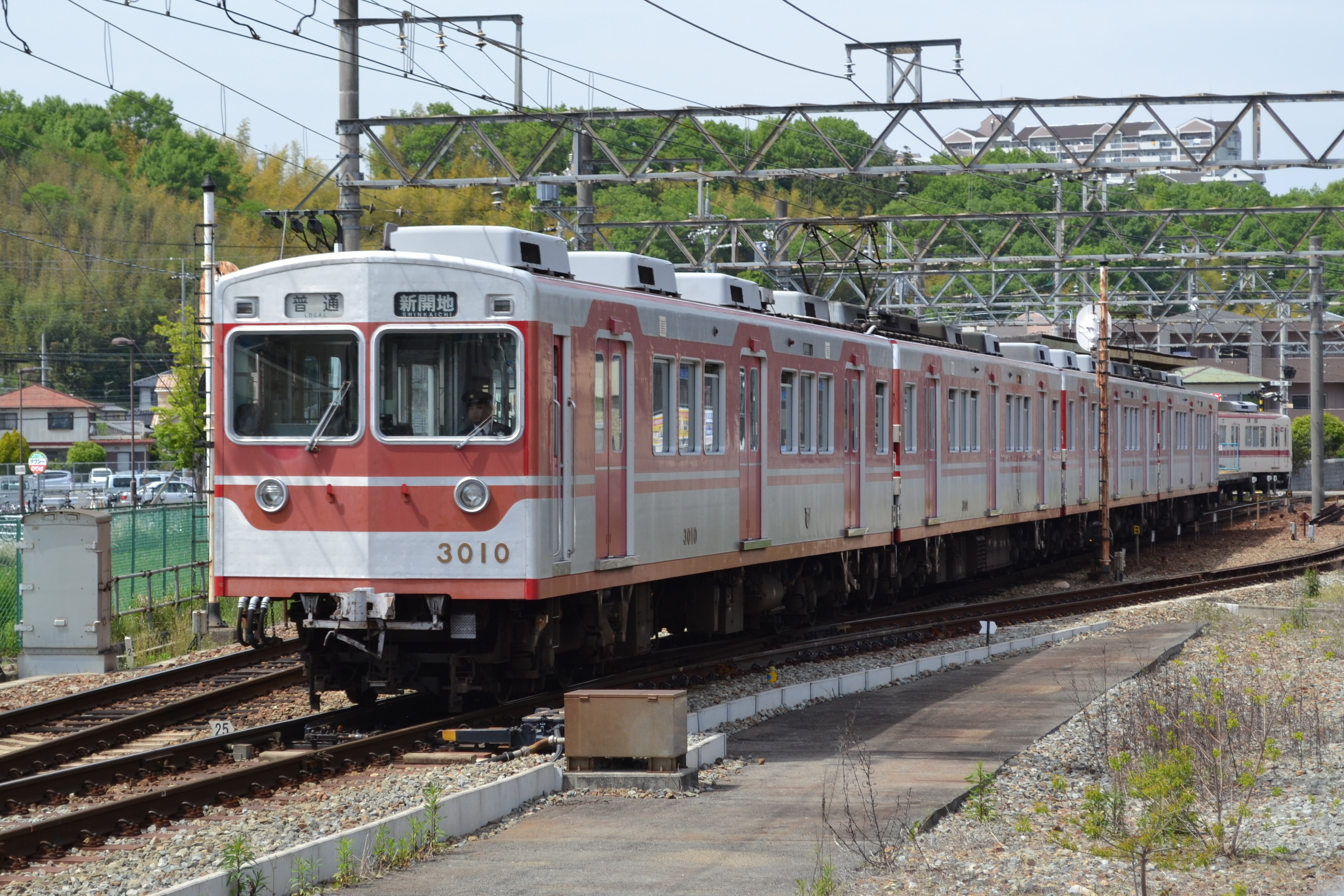
A 3000 series EMU in May 2014

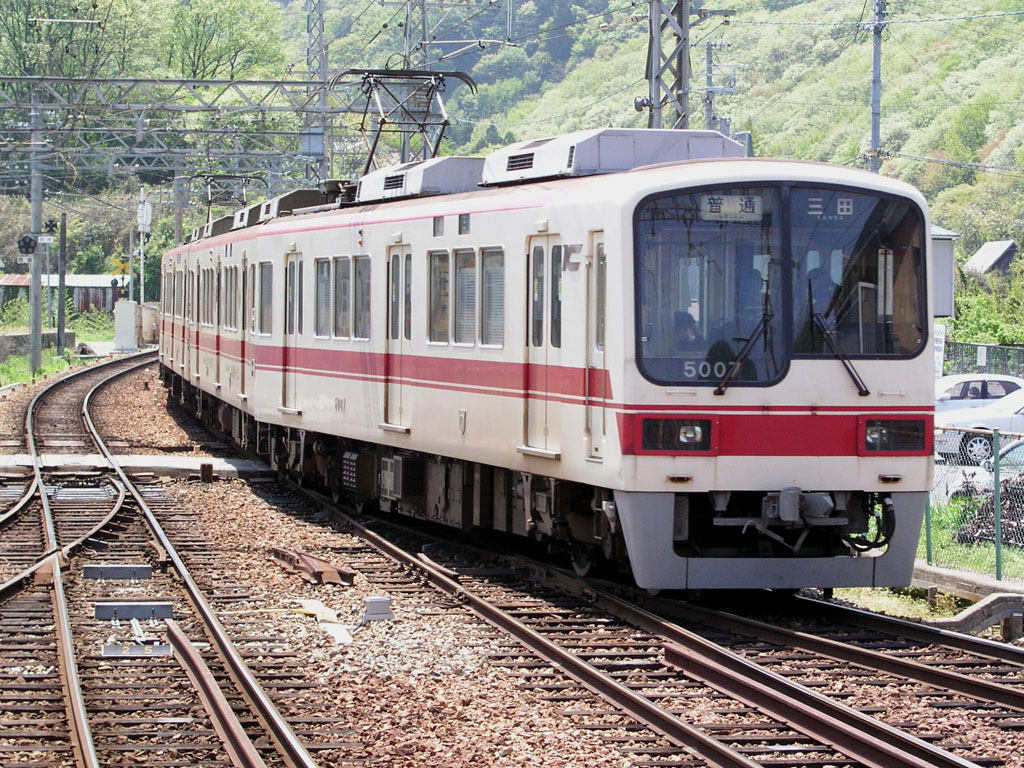
A 5000 series EMU in April 2003

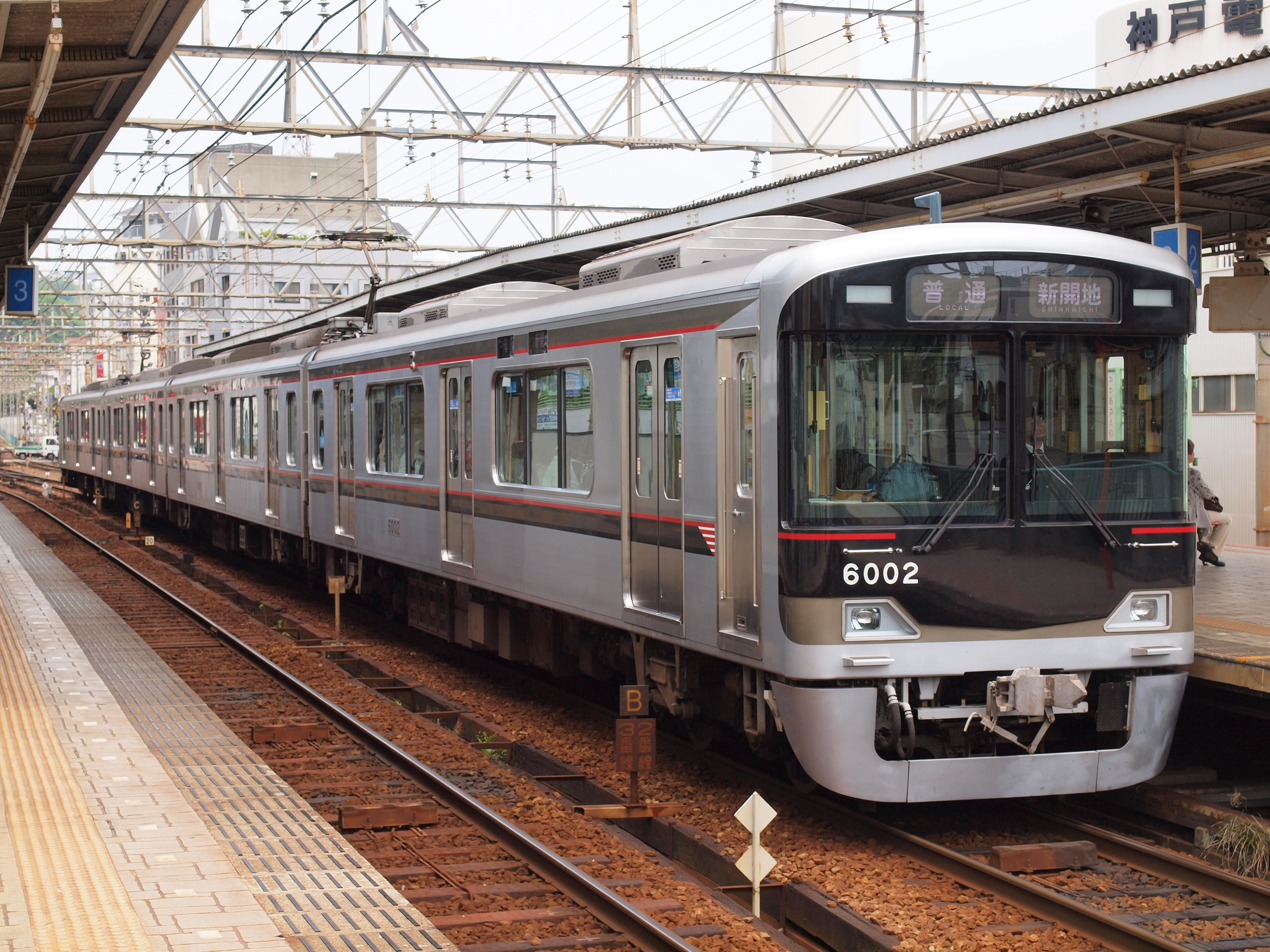
A 6000 series EMU

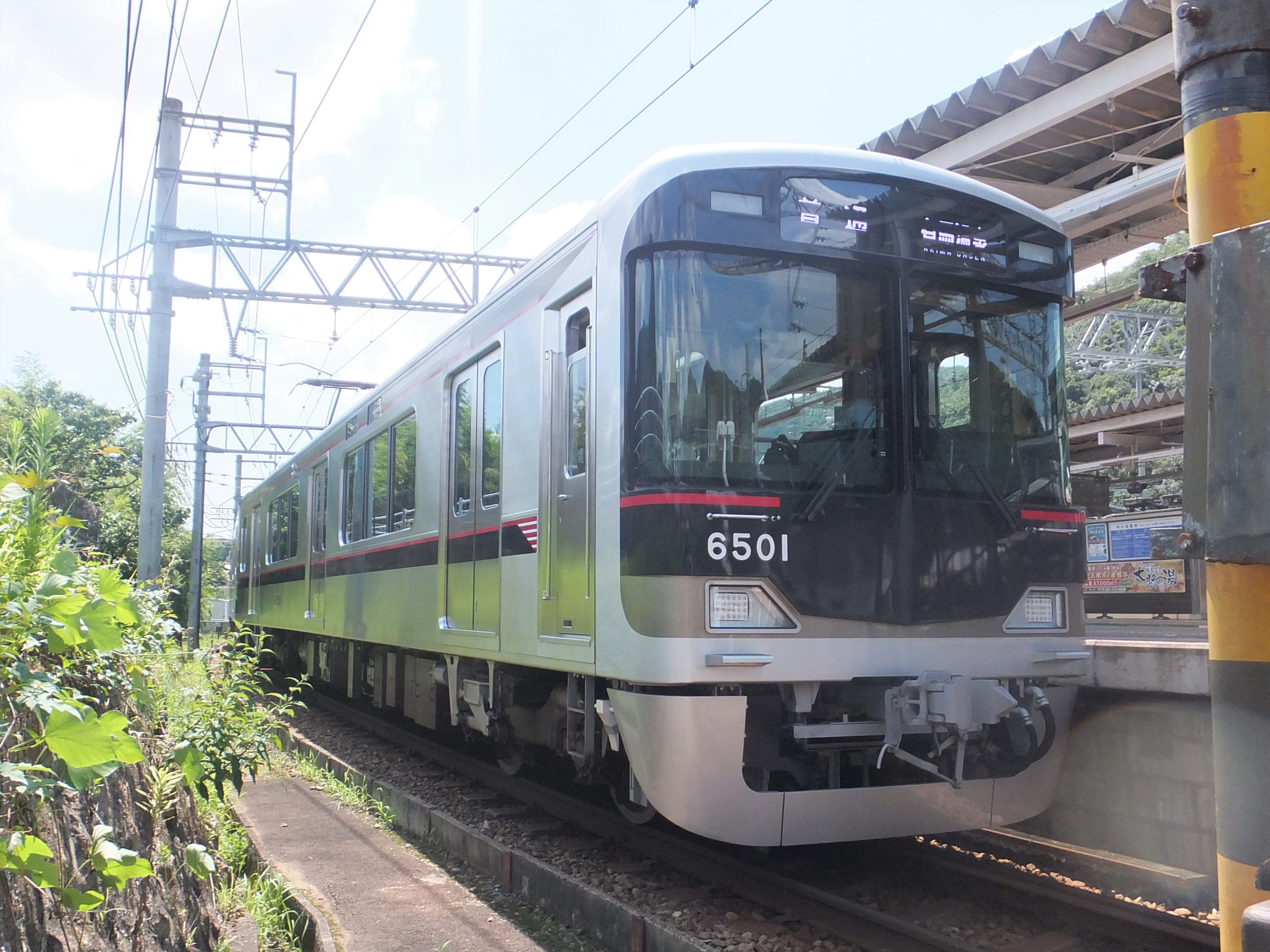
A 6500 series EMU in July 2016
