= Okaba Station =

Railway station in Kobe, Japan

KB22 Okaba Station 岡場駅
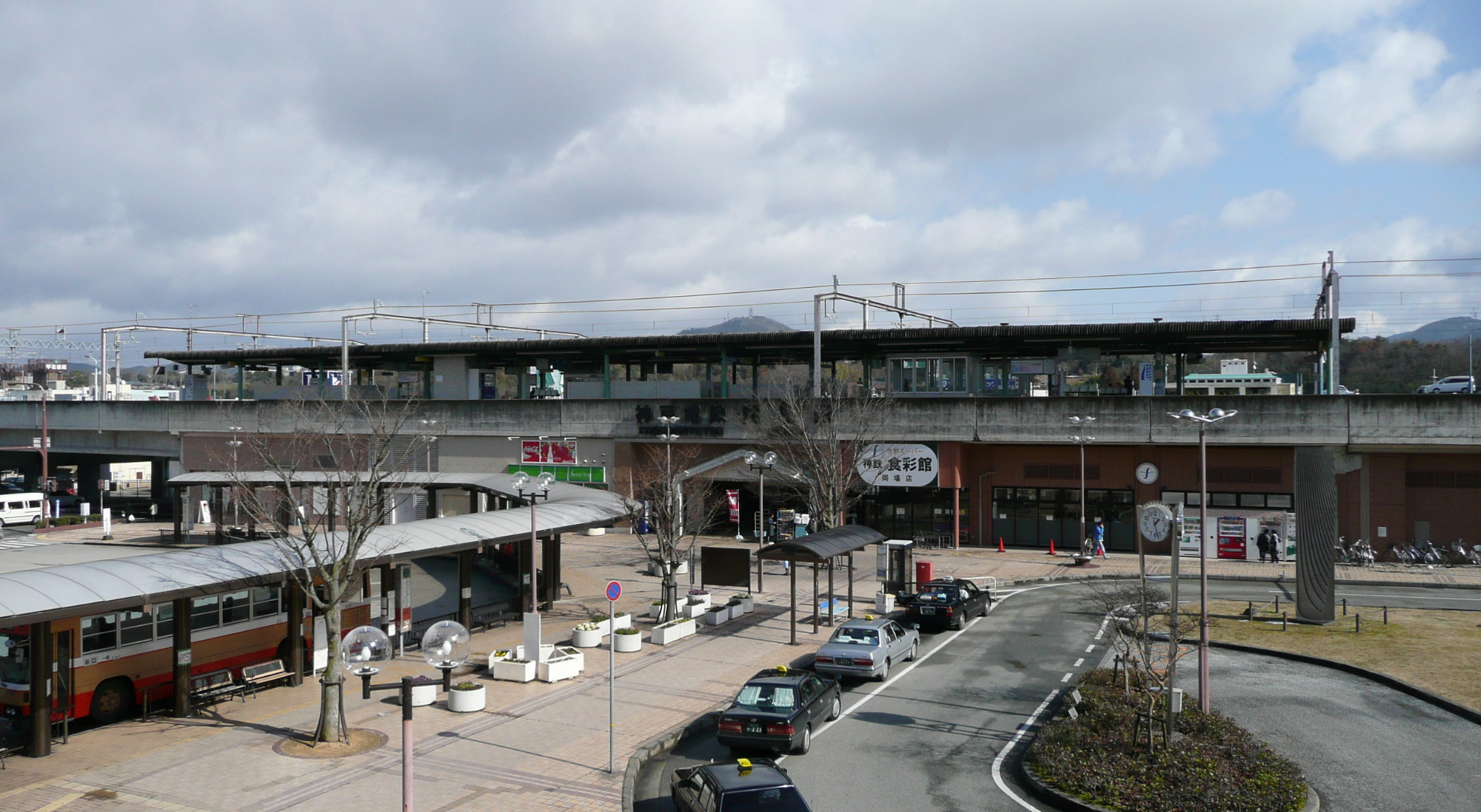
- West side of the station, 2008

General information
- Location: 1 Chome Fujiwaradai Nakamachi, Kita-ku, Kobe-shi Hyōgo-ken 651-1302; Japan
- Coordinates: 34°49′17.46″N 135°13′20.58″E
- Operator: Kobe Electric Railway (Shintetsu)
- Line: Shintetsu Sanda Line
- Distance: 3.3 km (2.1 miles) from Arimaguchi
- Platforms: 2 island platforms

Other information
- Status: Unstaffed
- Station code: KB22
- Website: Official website

History
- Opened: 28 December 1928

Passengers
- FY2019: 9,396
Location
- Location within Hyōgo Prefecture Location within Japan

Okaba Station (岡場駅, Okaba-eki) is a passenger railway station located in Kita-ku, Kobe, Hyōgo Prefecture, Japan. It is operated by the private transportation company, Kobe Electric Railway (Shintetsu).

== Lines ==
Okaba Station is served by the Shintetsu Sanda Line, and is located 3.3 kilometers from the terminus of the line at Arimaguchi, 23.3 kilometers from Minatogawa and 23.7 kilometers from Shinkaichi.

== Station layout ==
The station consists of two elevated island platforms, with the station building underneath. The effective length of each platform is 6 cars, but due to the position of the ATS to prevent accidental departure, a maximum of 4 cars can be used on Platforms 1 and 2 in the direction of Sanda, and a maximum of 5 cars can be used in Platforms 3 and 4 in the Shinkaichi direction.

=== Platforms ===
1, 2	■ Shintetsu Sanda Line	for Yokoyama and Sanda
3, 4	■ Shintetsu Sanda Line	for Arimaguchi and Minatogawa

== Adjacent stations ==
«	Service	»
Shintetsu Sanda Line
Tanigami	Special Rapid Express	Taoji
Gosha	Express	Taoji
Gosha	Semi-Express	Taoji
Gosha	Local	Taoji

== History ==
On 18 December 1928, the station was opened with the opening of the Sanda Line.

== Passenger statistics ==
In fiscal 2019, the station was used by an average of 9,396 passengers daily

== See also ==
- List of railway stations in Japan
