= Dōjō-minamiguchi Station =

Railway station in Kobe, Japan

KB25 Dōjō-minamiguchi Station 道場南口駅
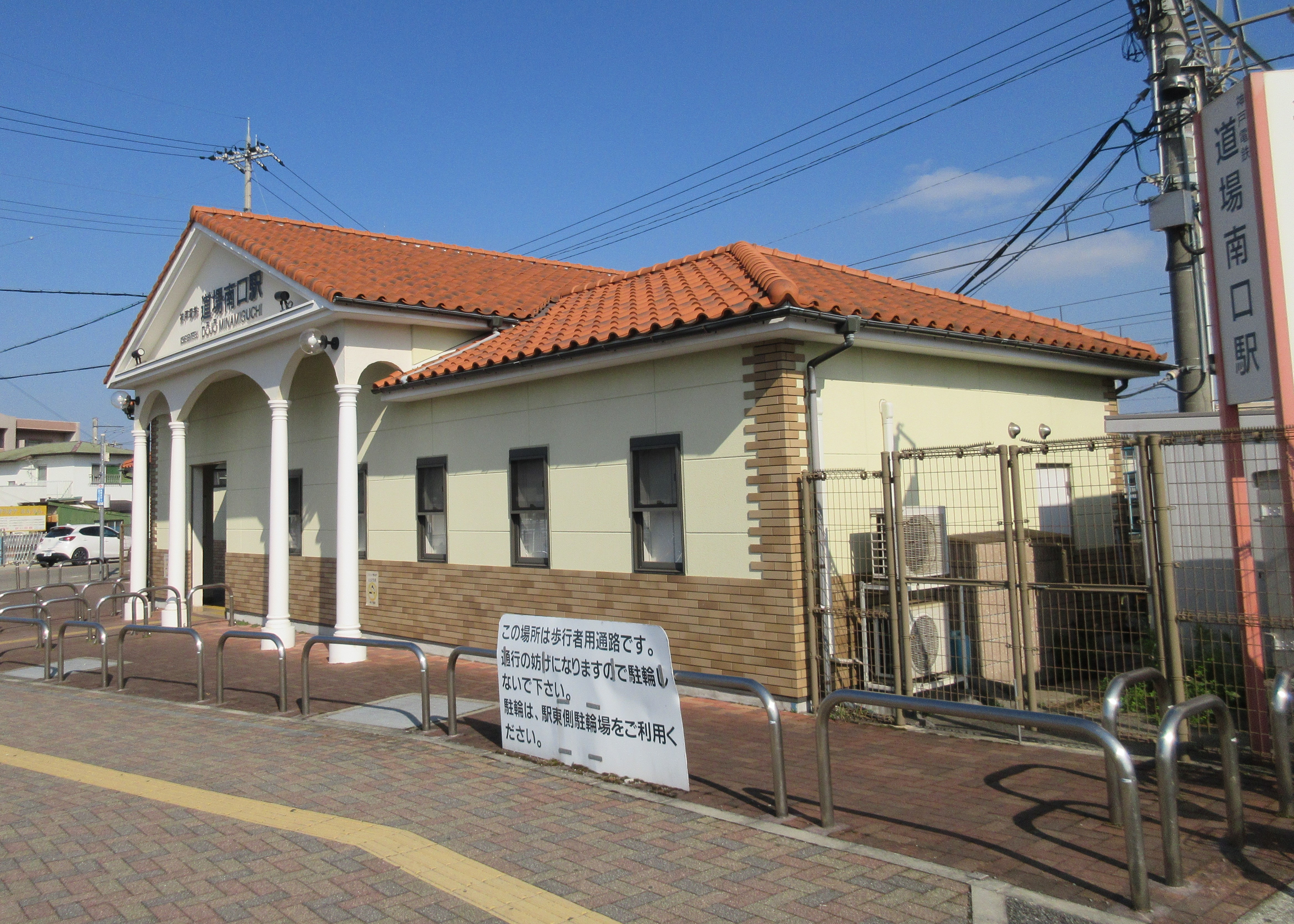
- Station building in November 2018

General information
- Location: Kusakabe, Dojo-cho, Kita-ku, Kobe-shi Hyōgo-ken 651-1505; Japan
- Coordinates: 34°51′22.59″N 135°13′22.83″E
- Operator: Kobe Electric Railway (Shintetsu)
- Line: Shintetsu Sanda Line
- Distance: 7.3 km (4.5 miles) from Arimaguchi
- Platforms: 1 island platform

Other information
- Status: Unstaffed
- Station code: KB25
- Website: Official website

History
- Opened: 28 December 1928

Passengers
- FY2019: 2,780
Location
- Location within Hyōgo Prefecture Location within Japan

Dōjō-minamiguchi Station (道場南口駅, Dōjō-minamiguchi-eki) is a passenger railway station located in Kita-ku Kobe, Hyōgo Prefecture, Japan. It is operated by the private transportation company, Kobe Electric Railway (Shintetsu).

== Lines ==
Dōjō-minamiguchi Station is served by the Shintetsu Sanda Line, and is located 7.3 kilometers from the terminus of the line at Arimaguchi, 27.3 kilometers from Minatogawa and 23.3 kilometers from Shinkaichi.

== Station layout ==
The station consists of one island platform, of which platform 2 is the primary platform and is used for bi-directional traffic. The platform is connected to the station building by a level crossing.

=== Platforms ===
1	■ Shintetsu Sanda Line	for Arimaguchi and Minatogawa
2	■ Shintetsu Sanda Line	for Arimaguchi and Minatogawa for Yokoyama and Sanda

== Adjacent stations ==
«	Service	»
Shintetsu Sanda Line
Nirō	Special Rapid Express	Shintetsu Dōjō
Nirō	Express	Shintetsu Dōjō
Nirō	Semi-Express	Shintetsu Dōjō
Nirō	Local	Shintetsu Dōjō

== History ==
On 18 December 1928, the station was opened with the opening of the Sanda Line.

== Passenger statistics ==
In fiscal 2019, the station was used by an average of 2,780 passengers daily

== Surrounding area ==
- Arima Highway
- Hyogo Prefectural Road No. 38 Miki Mita Line
- Kobe Research Park Kanokodai

== See also ==
- List of railway stations in Japan
