= Taoji Station =

Railway station in Kobe, Japan

KB23 Taoji Station 田尾寺駅
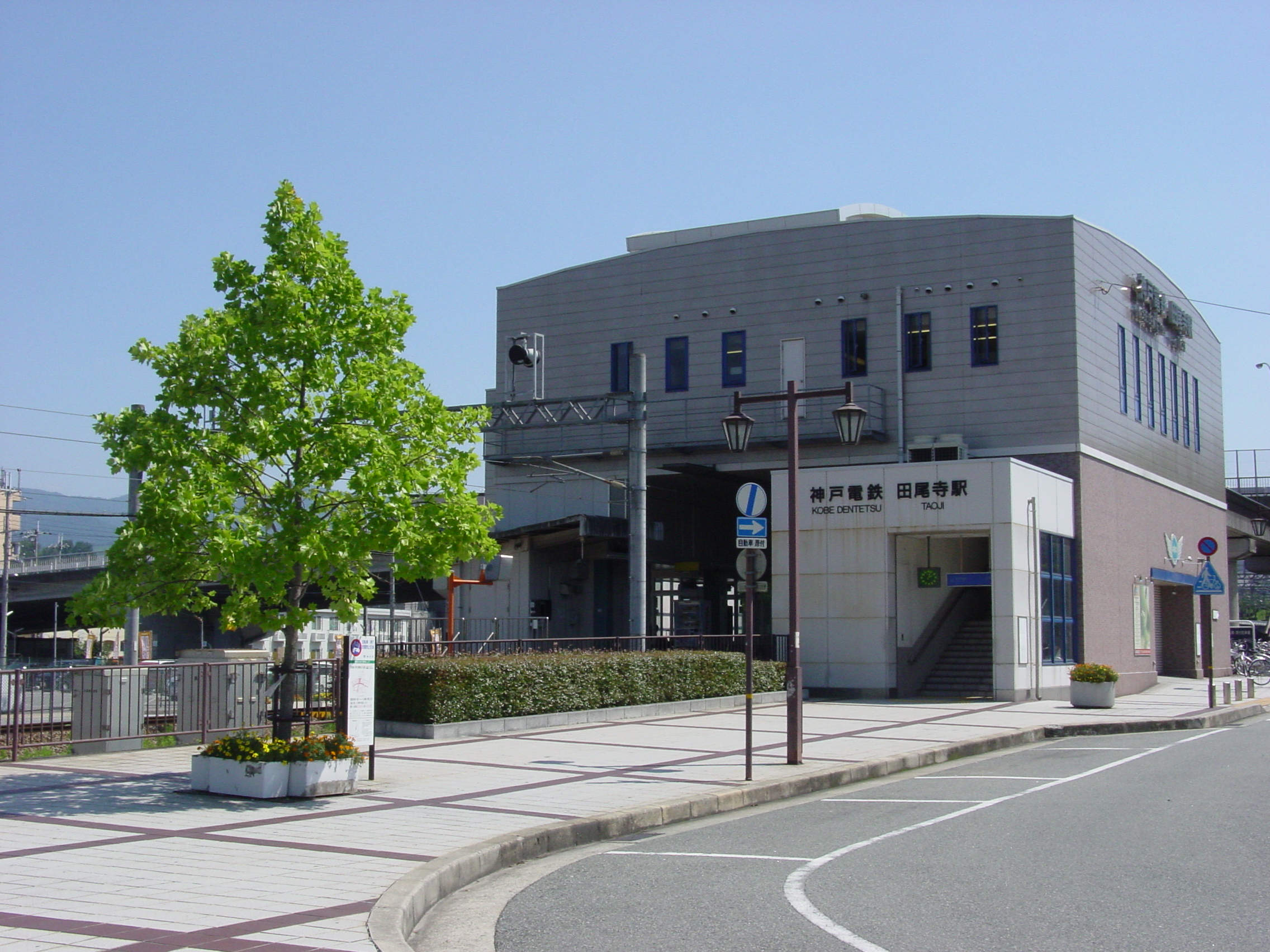
- Station building in 2008

General information
- Location: 7-chōme-1 Fujiwaradai Kitamachi, Kita-ku, Kobe-shi Hyōgo-ken 651-1301; Japan
- Coordinates: 34°50′7.69″N 135°13′33.58″E
- Operator: Kobe Electric Railway (Shintetsu)
- Line: Shintetsu Sanda Line
- Distance: 7.3 km (4.5 miles) from Arimaguchi
- Platforms: 1 island platform

Other information
- Status: Unstaffed
- Station code: KB23
- Website: Official website

History
- Opened: 28 December 1928

Passengers
- FY2019: 4697
Location
- Location within Hyōgo Prefecture Location within Japan

Taoji Station (田尾寺駅, Taoji-eki) is a passenger railway station located in Kita-ku Kobe, Hyōgo Prefecture, Japan. It is operated by the private transportation company, Kobe Electric Railway (Shintetsu).

== Lines ==
Taoji Station is served by the Shintetsu Sanda Line, and is located 4.9 kilometers from the terminus of the line at Arimaguchi, 24.9 kilometers from Minatogawa and 25.3 kilometers from Shinkaichi.

== Station layout ==
The station consists of one island platform with an elevated station building. The effective length of the platform is 4 cars, but there is space for extending the platform. The double track continuing from Okaba Station ends on the north side of the station.

=== Platforms ===
1	■ Shintetsu Sanda Line	for Yokoyama and Sanda
2	■ Shintetsu Sanda Line	for Arimaguchi and Minatogawa

== Adjacent stations ==
«	Service	»
Shintetsu Sanda Line
Okaba	Special Rapid Express	Nirō
Okaba	Express	Nirō
Okaba	Semi-Express	Nirō
Okaba	Local	Nirō

== History ==
On 18 December 1928, the station was opened with the opening of the Sanda Line.

== Passenger statistics ==
In fiscal 2019, the station was used by an average of 4,697 passengers daily

== Surrounding area ==
The area around the station is a residential area. Although it is located in Kobe, the station is also close to the city border with Nishinomiya and is used by many residents there.

== See also ==
- List of railway stations in Japan
