= Sanda Honmachi Station =

Railway station in Sanda, Hyōgo Prefecture, Japan

KB28 Sanda Honmachii Station 三田本町駅
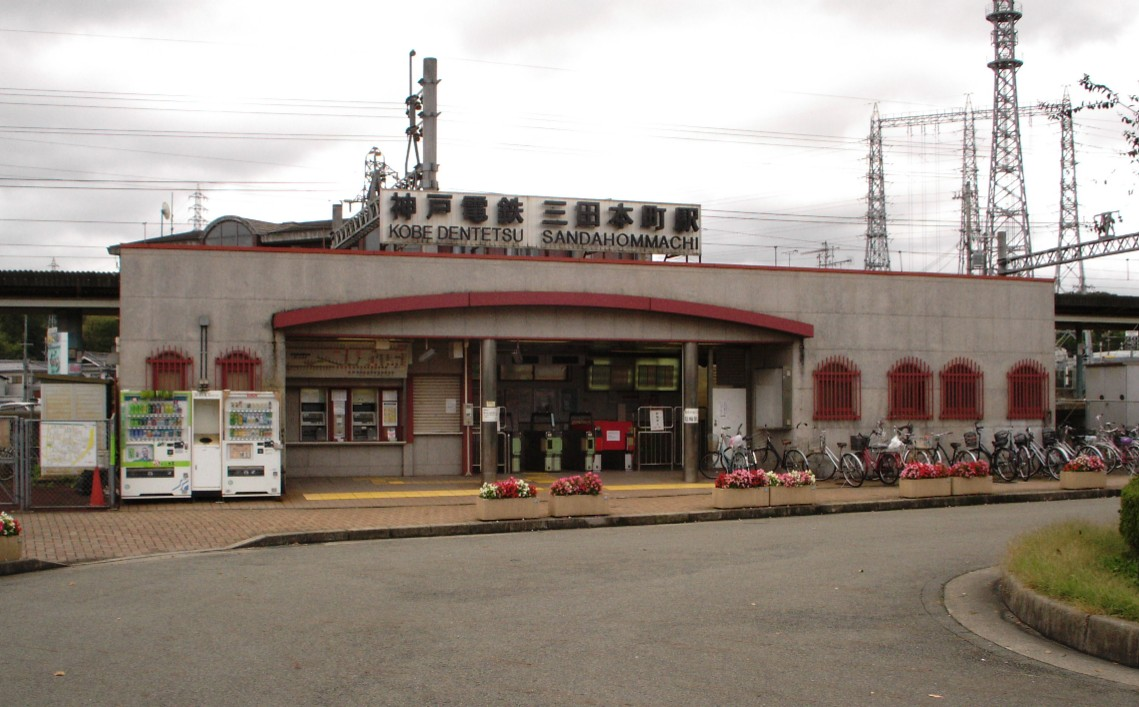
- Sanda Honmachi Station, October 2006

General information
- Location: 4 Aioichō, Sanda-shi, Hyōgo-ken 669-1525; Japan
- Coordinates: 34°52′54.44″N 135°13′46.30″E
- Owner: Kobe Electric Railway (Shintetsu)
- Line: Shintetsu Sanda Line
- Distance: 11.0 km (6.8 miles) from Arimaguchi
- Platforms: 1 island platform
- Connections: Bus stop

Other information
- Status: Unstaffed
- Station code: KB28
- Website: Official website

History
- Opened: 10 October 1929

Passengers
- FY2013: 338 daily
Location
- Location within Hyōgo Prefecture Location within Japan

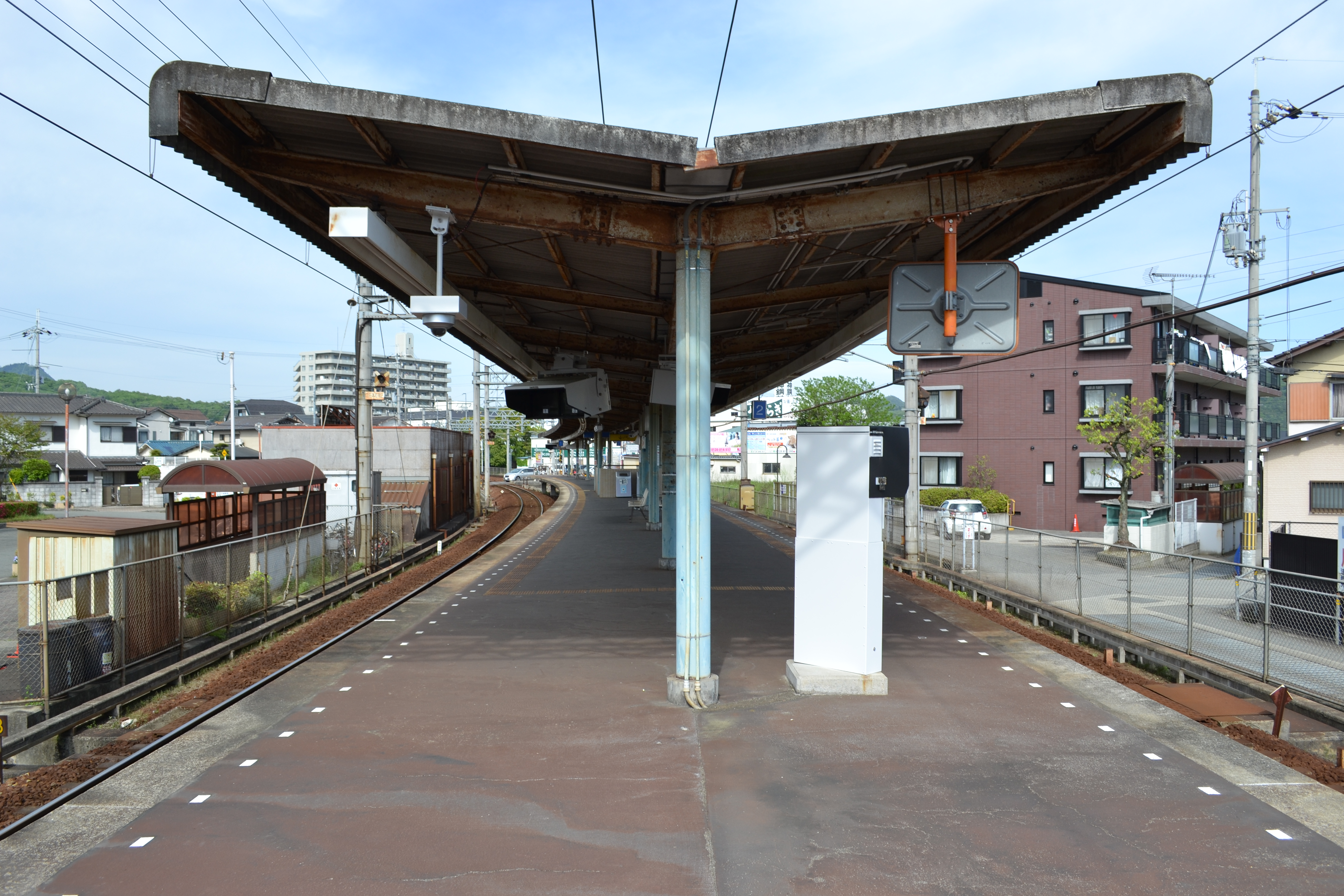
Platform of the station in 2014

Sanda Honmachi Station (三田本町駅, Sanda Honmachi-eki) is a passenger railway station located in the city of Sanda, Hyōgo Prefecture, Japan. It is operated by the private transportation company, Kobe Electric Railway (Shintetsu).

== Lines ==
Sanda Honmachi Station is served by the Shintetsu Sanda Line, and is located 11.0 kilometers from the terminus of the line at Arimaguchi, 31.0 kilometers from Minatogawa and 31.4 kilometers from Shinkaichi.

== Station layout ==
The station consists of one ground-level island platform serving two tracks, connected to the station building by an underground passage. The station is unattended.

=== Platforms ===
1	■ Shintetsu Sanda Line	for Sanda
2	■ Shintetsu Sanda Line	for Shinkaichi and Woody Town Chūō

== Adjacent stations ==
«	Service	»
Shintetsu Sanda Line
Yokoyama	Special Rapid Express	Sanda
Yokoyama	Express	Sanda
Yokoyama	Semi-Express	Sanda
Yokoyama	Local	Sanda

== History ==
Sanda Honmachi Station opened on October 10, 1929 as a station on the Kobe Arima Electric Railway Sanda Line. On January 9, 1947 due to a company merger, it became a station on the Kobe Electric Railway. The station building was reconstructed in 1991.

== Passenger statistics ==
In fiscal 2019, the station was used by an average of 338 passengers daily

== Surrounding area ==
Although it is located on the outskirts of Sanda City, it is close to Honmachi, the center of the old town

- Japan National Route 276

== See also ==
- List of railway stations in Japan
