= Aino Station (Hyōgo) =

Railway station in Sanda, Hyōgo Prefecture, Japan

Aino Station 相野駅
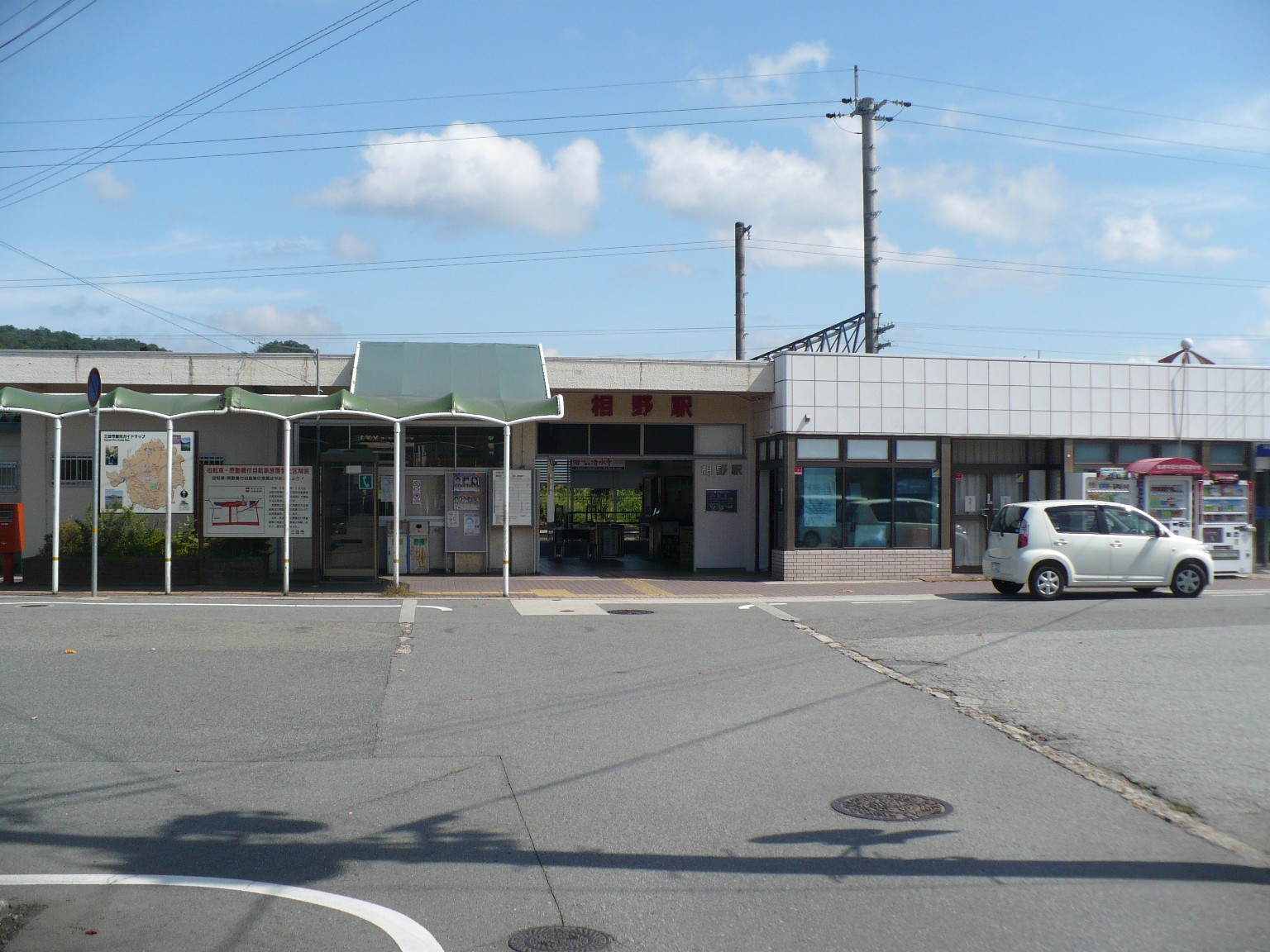
- Aino Station in September 2009

General information
- Location: Shimoaino Gotanda 331-1, Sanda-shi, Hyōgo-ken 669-1345; Japan
- Coordinates: 34°56′50.92″N 135°9′21.74″E
- Owner: West Japan Railway Company
- Operator: West Japan Railway Company
- Lines: Fukuchiyama Line (JR Takarazuka Line)
- Distance: 44.0 km (27.3 miles) from Amagasaki
- Platforms: 2 side platforms
- Connections: Bus stop

Construction
- Structure type: Ground level
- Accessible: None

Other information
- Status: Staffed (Midori no Madoguchi)
- Station code: JR-G63
- Website: Official website

History
- Opened: 25 March 1899

Passengers
- FY2016: 3548 daily
Location
- Location within Hyōgo Prefecture Location within Japan

Aino Station (相野駅, Aino-eki) is a passenger railway station located in the city of Sanda, Hyōgo Prefecture, Japan. It is operated by the West Japan Railway Company (JR West).

== Lines ==
Aino Station is served by the Fukuchiyama Line (JR Takarazuka Line), and is located 44.0 kilometers from the terminus of the line at Amagasaki and 51.7 kilometers from Osaka.

== Station layout ==
The station consists of two opposed ground-level side platforms connected to the station building by a footbridge. The station has a Midori no Madoguchi staffed ticket office.

=== Platforms ===
1	■ Fukuchiyama Line (JR Takarazuka Line)	for Sasayamaguchi and Fukuchiyama
2	■ Fukuchiyama Line (JR Takarazuka Line)	for Sanda and Takarazuka

== Adjacent stations ==
«	Service	»
Fukuchiyama Line (JR Takarazuka Line)
Hirono	Local	Aimoto
Hirono	Regional Rapid Service	Aimoto
Hirono	Rapid Service	Aimoto
Hirono	Tambaji Rapid Service	Aimoto

== History ==
Aino Station opened on 25 March 1899, as a station of Hankaku Railway, which was nationalized in 1907. With the privatization of the Japan National Railways (JNR) on 1 April 1987, the station came under the aegis of the West Japan Railway Company.

Station numbering was introduced in March 2018 with Aino being assigned station number JR-G64.

== Passenger statistics ==
In fiscal 2016, the station was used by an average of 3548 passengers daily

== Surrounding area ==
- Aino Hospital
- Minatogawa College
- Sanda Matsusei High School

== See also ==
- List of railway stations in Japan
