= Minami Woody Town Station =

Railway station in Sanda, Hyōgo Prefecture, Japan

KB32 Minami Woody Town 南ウッディタウン駅
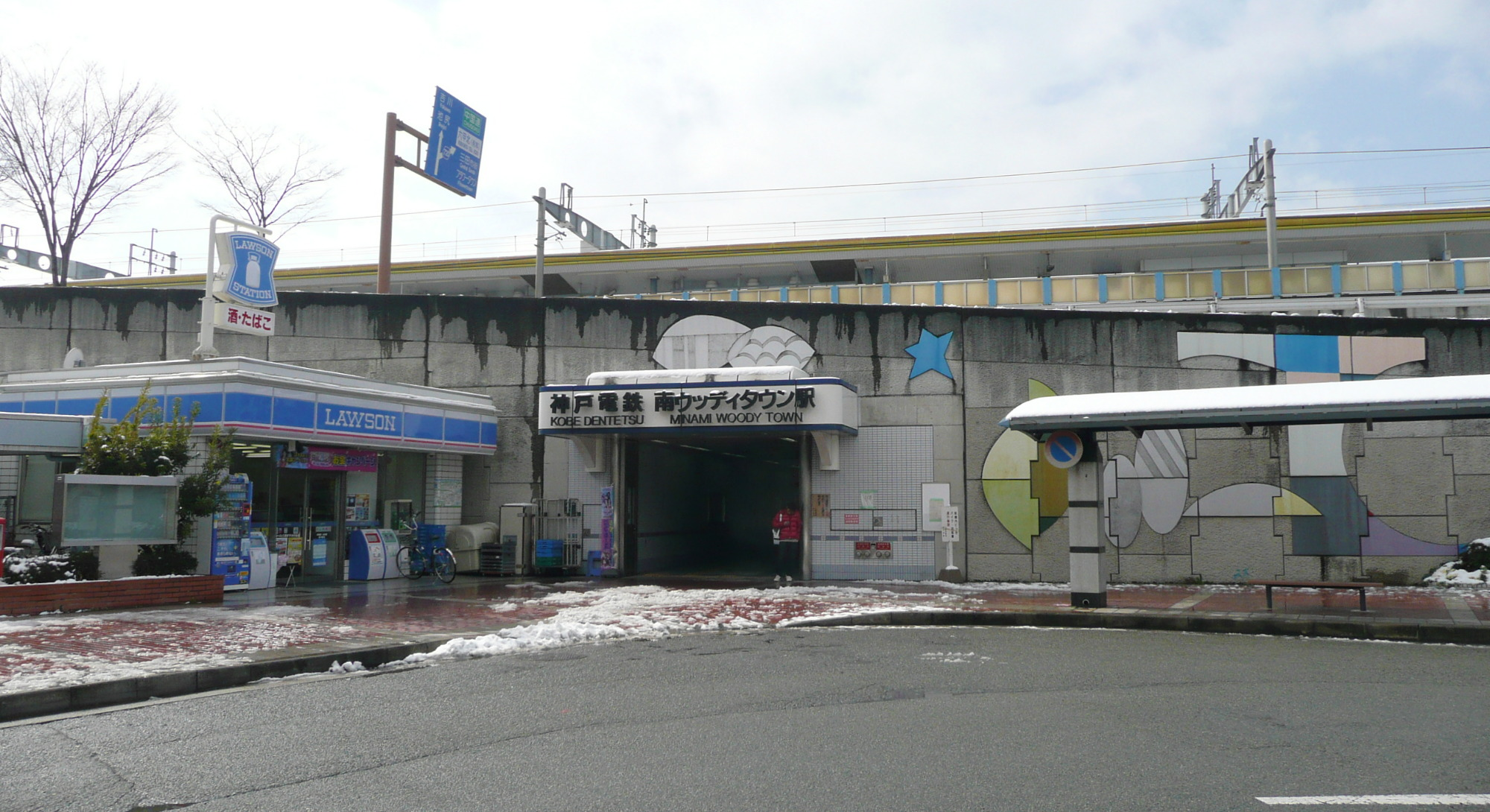
- Minami Woody Town Station east entrance

General information
- Location: 5-101-5 Akashiadai, Sanda-shi, Hyōgo-ken
- Coordinates: 34°54′5.91″N 135°11′22.83″E
- Operator: Kobe Electric Railway (Shintetsu)
- Line: Shintetsu Kōen-Toshi Line
- Distance: 4.5 km (2.8 miles) from Yokoyama
- Platforms: 1 island platform
- Tracks: 2

Other information
- Status: Unstaffed
- Station code: KB32
- Website: Official website

History
- Opened: 28 March 1996

Passengers
- FY2023: 1,701 (daily)

Services
Preceding station	Kobe Electric Railway	Following station
Woody Town Chūō KB33 Terminus	Kōen-Toshi Line	Flower Town KB31 towards Yokoyama
Location
- Location within Hyōgo Prefecture Location within Japan

Minami Woody Town Station (南ウッディタウン駅, Minami-Uddi-taun-eki) is a passenger railway station located in the city of Sanda, Hyōgo Prefecture, Japan. It is operated by the private transportation company, Kobe Electric Railway (Shintetsu).

== Lines ==
Minami Woody Town Station is served by the Shintetsu Kōen-Toshi Line, and is located 4.5 kilometers from the terminus of the line at Yokoyama and 6.5 kilometers from Sanda.

== Station layout ==
The station consists of one elevated island platform serving two tracks, with the station building underneath. The effective length of the platform is five cars, but normally only three-car trains are operated. The station is unattended.

=== Platforms ===
1	■ Kōen-Toshi Line	for Woody Town Chūō
2	■ Kōen-Toshi Line	for Sanda

== History ==
The station was opened on March 28, 1996.

== Passenger statistics ==
In FY2023, the station was used by an average of 1701 passengers daily. (Note: Data published by the Ministry of Land, Infrastructure, Transport and Tourism state the number of passengers boarding and disembarking by station in a given year. FY2023 covers the period from 1 April 2023 to 31 March 2024. Data published by individual railways directly may state the number boarding only.)

== Surrounding area ==
The station is part of the Kobe-Sanda International Park City, with the surrounding area mostly residential.

- Hyogo Prefectural Road No. 720 Techno Park Mita Line

== See also ==
- List of railway stations in Japan
