= Hirono Station =

Hirono Station is the name of multiple train stations in Japan.

- Hirono Station (Fukushima) in Fukushima Prefecture
- Hirono Station (Hyōgo) in Hyōgo Prefecture
