= Flower Town Station =

Railway station in Sanda, Hyōgo Prefecture, Japan

KB31 Flower Town Station フラワータウン駅
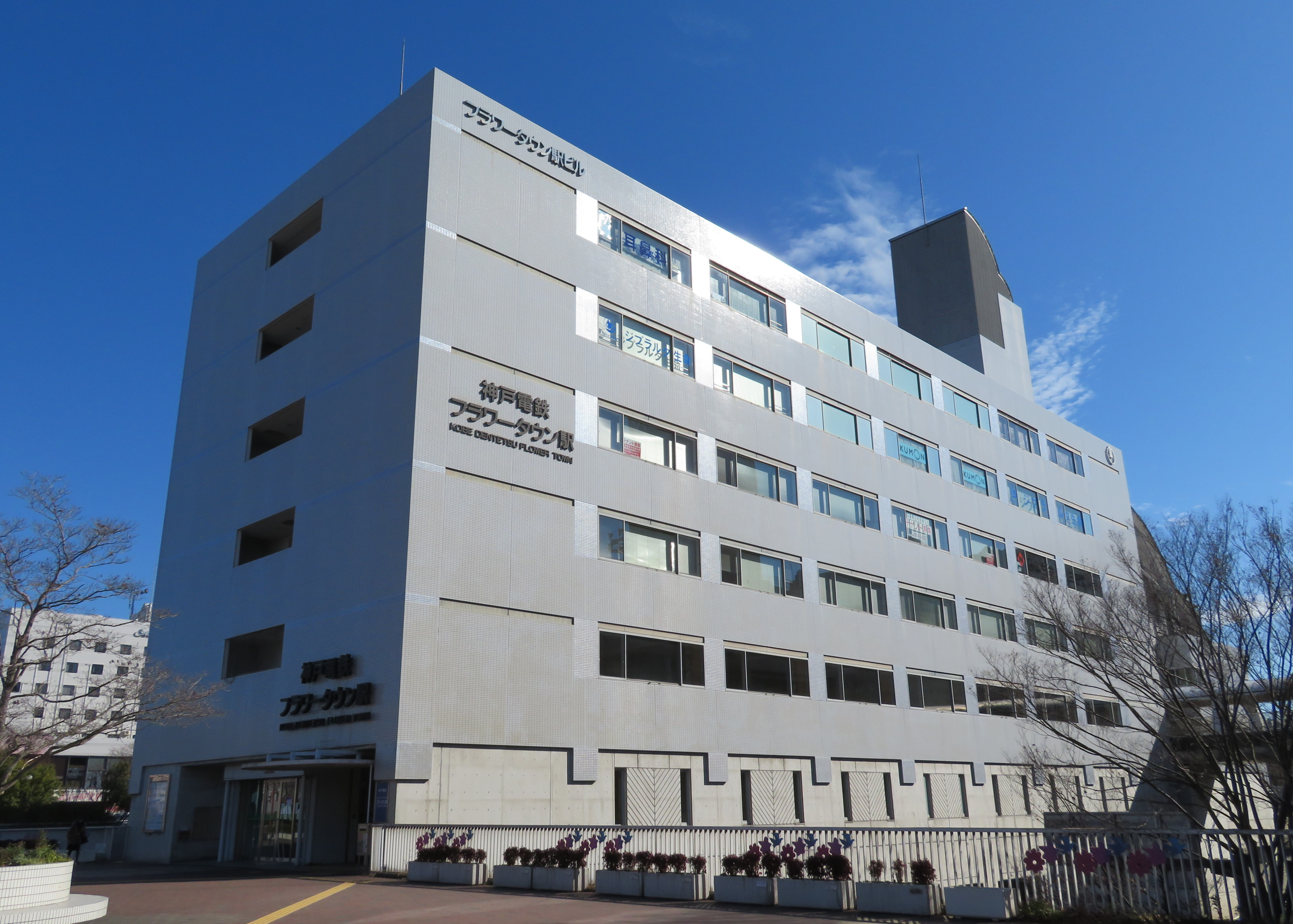
- Station building in 2019

General information
- Location: 1-11 Yayoigaoka, Sanda-shi, Hyōgo-ken 669-1546
- Coordinates: 34°53′7.86″N 135°12′8.37″E
- Operator: Kobe Electric Railway (Shintetsu)
- Line: Shintetsu Kōen-Toshi Line
- Distance: 2.3 km (1.4 miles) from Yokoyama
- Platforms: 1 island platform
- Tracks: 2

Other information
- Status: Unstaffed
- Station code: KB31
- Website: Official website

History
- Opened: 28 March 1996

Passengers
- 2019: 4,357 (daily)

Services
Preceding station	Kobe Electric Railway	Following station
Minami Woody Town KB32 towards Woody Town Chūō	Kōen-Toshi Line	Yokoyama KB27 Terminus
Location
- Location within Hyōgo Prefecture Location within Japan

Flower Town Station (フラワータウン駅, Furawā-taun-eki) is a passenger railway station located in the city of Sanda, Hyōgo Prefecture, Japan. It is operated by the private transportation company, Kobe Electric Railway (Shintetsu).

== Lines ==
Flower Town Station is the terminus of the Shintetsu Kōen-Toshi Line, and is located 5.5 kilometers from the opposing terminus of the line at Yokoyama and 7.5 kilometers from Sanda.

== Station layout ==
The station consists of one island platform serving two tracks. The effective length of the platform is five cars, but normally only three-car trains are operated. The station building has seven floors and with the platform is on the 1st floor and the ticket gate is on the 2nd floor. The 2nd floor of the adjacent Flora 88 shopping center (AEON Mita store) and the 3rd floor of the station building are connected by a walkway.

=== Platforms ===
1	■ Kōen-Toshi Line	for Woody Town Chūō
2	■ Kōen-Toshi Line	for Sanda

== History ==
The station was opened on October 28,1991.

== Passenger statistics ==
In fiscal 2019, the station was used by an average of 2,693 passengers daily

== Surrounding area ==
The station is part of the Kobe-Sanda International Park City, with the surrounding area both commercial and residential.

- Hyogo Prefectural Road No. 720 Techno Park Mita Line
- Flora 88 Shopping Center (Aeon Mita Store)

== See also ==
- List of railway stations in Japan
