= Shintetsu Sanda Line =

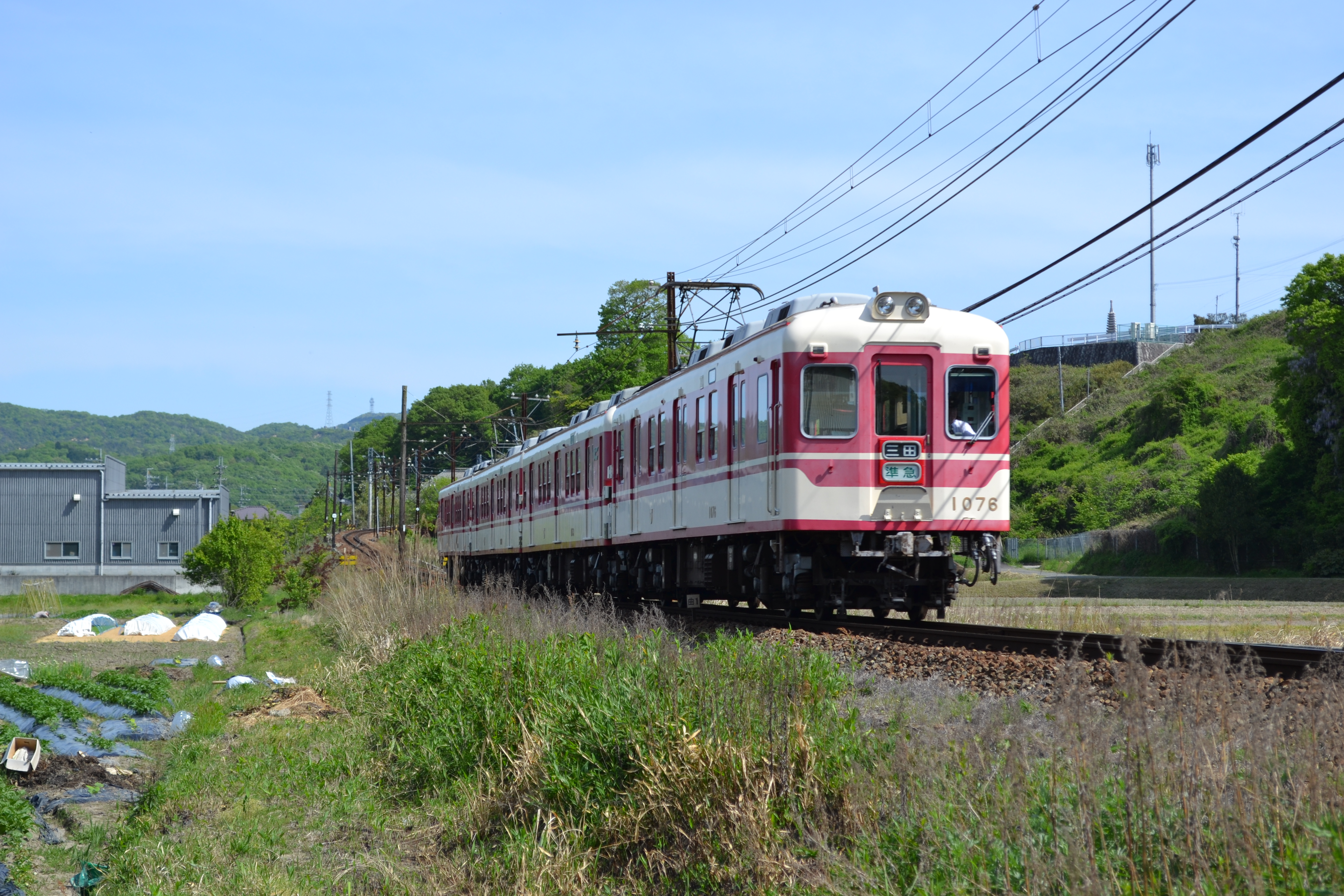
- Local train running between Shintetsu Dōjō and Yokoyama, 2014

Overview
- Status: Operational
- Locale: Kobe, Hyōgo Prefecture
- Termini: Arimaguchi; Sanda
- Continues as: Arima Line (from Arimaguchi); Kōen-Toshi Line (from Yokoyama)
- Stations: 10

Service
- Route number: KB

History
- Opened: November 11, 1928; 97 years ago

Technical
- Line length: 12 km (7.5 mi)
- Track gauge: 1,067 mm (3 ft 6 in)
- Electrification: 1500 V DC overhead catenary

The Sanda Line (神戸電鉄三田線, Kōbe Dentetsu Sanda-sen) is a commuter railway line in Hyōgo Prefecture, Japan operated by Kobe Electric Railway. It connects Kobe with its northern suburb, Sanda.

The line is 12.0 kilometres (7.5 mi) long, extending from Arimaguchi in Kita-ku to Sanda, where the line connects with the JR West JR Takarazuka Line/Fukuchiyama Line, although most trains continue past Arimaguchi to Shinkaichi via the Arima Line and Kobe Rapid Railway Namboku Line.

== History ==
The entire line opened in 1928, 1,067 mm (3 ft 6 in) gauge and electrified at 1500 VDC.

In 1991 the Sanda - Yokoyama section was duplicated, as was the Taoji - Okaba section in 1998.

In November 1995, Special Rapid Express services were introduced to the timetable.

In March 2011, the smoking areas in all Sanda Line stations were removed, and smoking was banned.

=== Former connecting lines ===
Sanda station - The 12 km line to Arima operated from 1915 to 1943.

== Stations ==
There are four types of services, each stops at the stations marked "S" and not at those marked "↑" in the table below.

No.	Station		Distance (km)	Local	Semi-Express	Express	Special Rapid Express	Connections	Location
↑ Through Service via the Shintetsu Arima Line and Kobe Kosoku Line to/from Shinkaichi ↑
KB15	Arimaguchi	有馬口	0.0	S	S	S	↑	Arima Line (Through Service)	Kita-ku, Kobe
KB21	Gosha	五社	1.4	S	S	S	↑		Kita-ku, Kobe
KB22	Okaba	岡場	3.3	S	S	S	S		Kita-ku, Kobe
KB23	Taoji	田尾寺	4.9	S	S	S	S		Kita-ku, Kobe
KB24	Nirō	二郎	6.4	S	S	S	S		Kita-ku, Kobe
KB25	Dōjō-minamiguchi	道場南口	7.3	S	S	S	S		Kita-ku, Kobe
KB26	Shintetsu Dōjō	神鉄道場	8.5	S	S	S	S		Kita-ku, Kobe
↑ Through Service via the Shintetsu Koen-Toshi Line to/from Woody Town Chūō ↑
KB27	Yokoyama	横山	10.0	S	S	S	S	Koen-Toshi Line (Through Service)	Sanda
KB28	Sanda Honmachi	三田本町	11.0	S	S	S	S		Sanda
KB29	Sanda	三田	12.0	S	S	S	S	Fukuchiyama Line (JR Takarazuka Line)	Sanda
