= Nirō Station =

Railway station in Kobe, Japan

KB24 Nirō Station 二郎駅
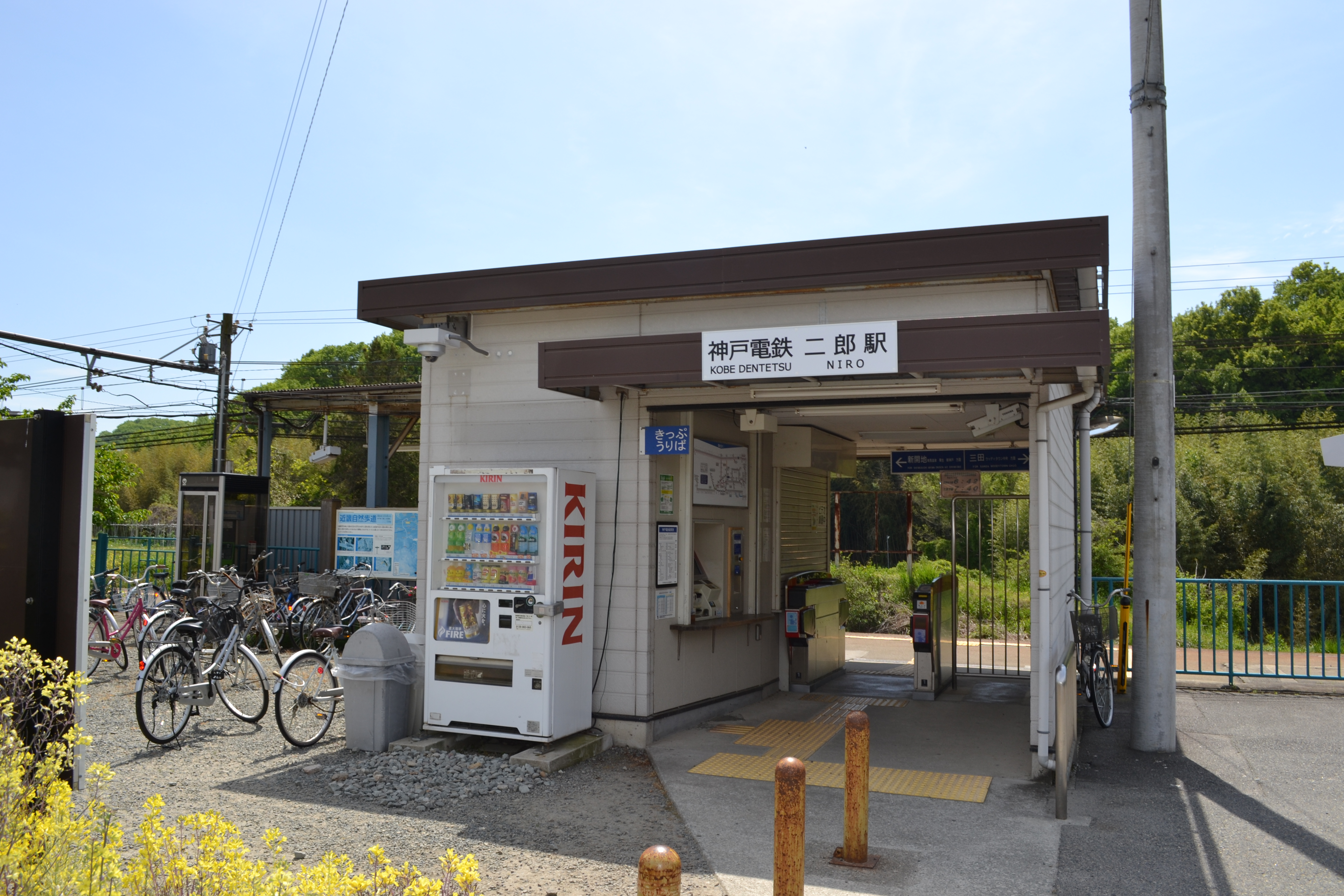
- Station building in May 2014

General information
- Location: Niro Arinocho, Kita-ku, Kobe-shi Hyōgo-ken 651-1311; Japan
- Coordinates: 34°50′56.37″N 135°13′37.05″E
- Operator: Kobe Electric Railway (Shintetsu)
- Line: Shintetsu Sanda Line
- Distance: 6.4 km (4.0 miles) from Arimaguchi
- Platforms: 1 side platform

Other information
- Status: Unstaffed
- Station code: KB24
- Website: Official website

History
- Opened: 28 December 1928

Passengers
- FY2019: 177
Location
- Location within Hyōgo Prefecture Location within Japan

Nirō Station (二郎駅, Nirō-eki) is a passenger railway station located in Kita-ku Kobe, Hyōgo Prefecture, Japan. It is operated by the private transportation company, Kobe Electric Railway (Shintetsu).

== Lines ==
Nirō Dōjō Station is served by the Shintetsu Sanda Line, and is located 6.4 kilometers from the terminus of the line at Arimaguchi, 26.4 kilometers from Minatogawa and 24.8 kilometers from Shinkaichi.

== Station layout ==
The station consists of one side platform serving a single bidirectional track. The station is unattended.

== Adjacent stations ==
«	Service	»
Shintetsu Sanda Line
Taoji	Special Rapid Express	Dōjō-minamiguchi
Taoji	Express	Dōjō-minamiguchi
Taoji	Semi-Express	Dōjō-minamiguchi
Taoji	Local	Dōjō-minamiguchi

== History ==
On 18 December 1928, Nirō Station was opened in tandem with the opening of the Sanda Line.

== Passenger statistics ==
In fiscal 2019, the station was used by an average of 177 passengers daily

== Surrounding area ==
- Kita-Kobe Denen Sports Park
- Ajisai Stadium North Kobe

== See also ==
- List of railway stations in Japan
