= Aimoto Station (Hyōgo) =

Railway station in Sanda, Hyōgo Prefecture, Japan

Aimoto Station 藍本駅
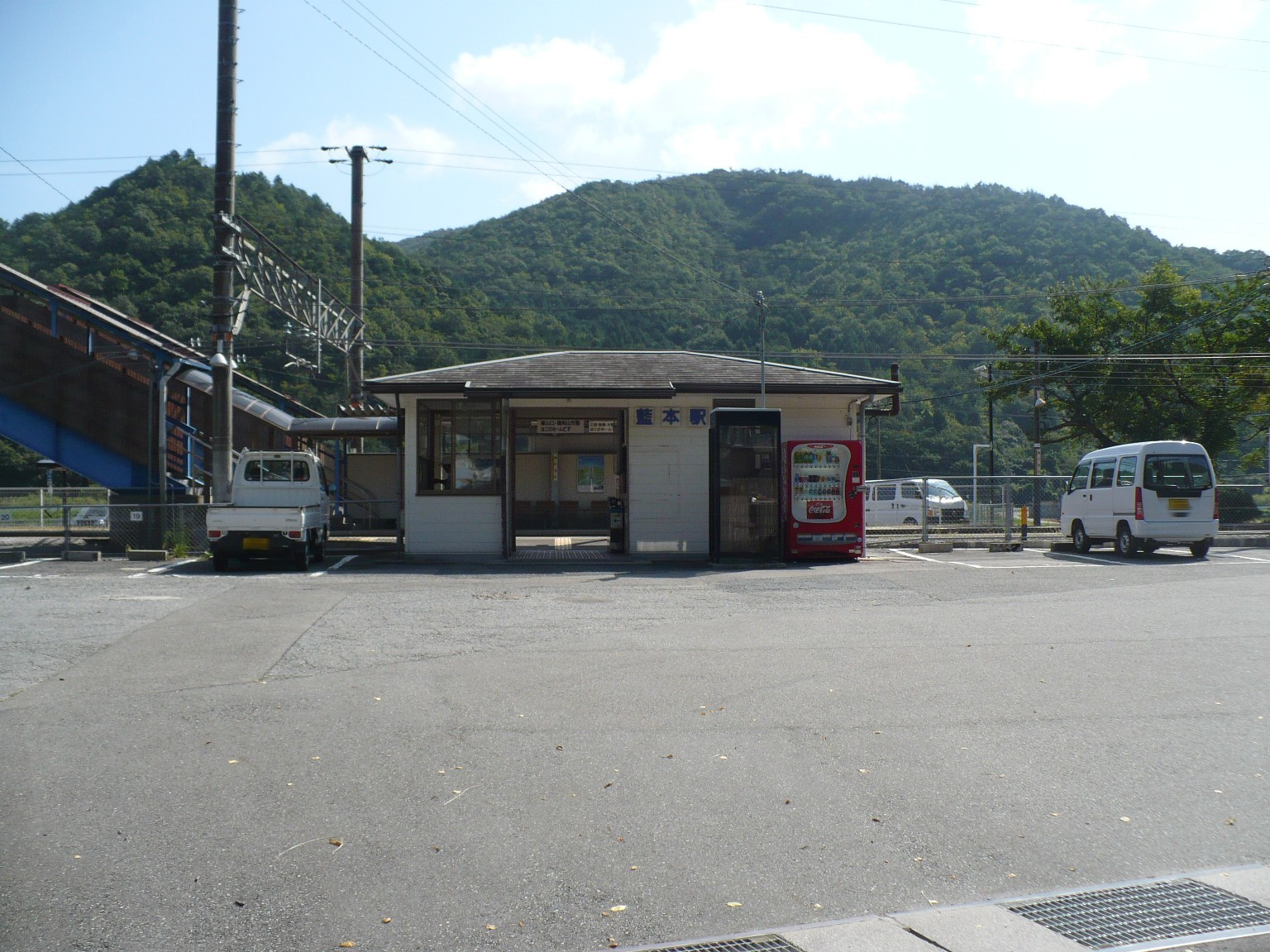
- Aimoto Station in September 2009

General information
- Location: Aimoto Fuke 952-1, Sanda-shi, Hyōgo-ken 669-1358; Japan
- Coordinates: 34°58′37″N 135°09′19″E
- Owner: West Japan Railway Company
- Operator: West Japan Railway Company
- Lines: Fukuchiyama Line (JR Takarazuka Line)
- Distance: 48.2 km (30.0 miles) from Amagasaki
- Platforms: 2 side platforms
- Connections: Bus stop

Construction
- Structure type: Ground level
- Accessible: None

Other information
- Status: Unstaffed
- Station code: JR-G65
- Website: Official website

History
- Opened: 25 March 1899

Passengers
- FY2016: 203 daily
Location
- Location within Hyōgo Prefecture Location within Japan

Aimoto Station (藍本駅, Aimoto-eki) is a passenger railway station located in the city of Sanda, Hyōgo Prefecture, Japan. It is operated by the West Japan Railway Company (JR West).

== Lines ==
Aimoto Station is served by the Fukuchiyama Line (JR Takarazuka Line), and is located 48.2 kilometers from the terminus of the line at Amagasaki and 55.9 kilometers from Osaka.

== Station layout ==
The station consists of two opposed ground-level side platforms connected to the station building by a footbridge. Originally the station has a side platform and an island platform, but the track on one side of the island platform (Platform 2) have been removed. The station is unattended.

=== Platforms ===
| 1 | ■ Fukuchiyama Line (JR Takarazuka Line) | for Sasayamaguchi and Fukuchiyama |
| 2 | ■ Fukuchiyama Line (JR Takarazuka Line) | for Sanda and Takarazuka |

== Adjacent stations ==
| « | Service | » |
Fukuchiyama Line (JR Takarazuka Line)
| Aino | Local | Kusano |
| Aino | Regional Rapid Service | Kusano |
| Aino | Rapid Service | Kusano |
| Aino | Tambaji Rapid Service | Kusano |

== History ==
Aimoto Station opened on 25 March 1899, as a station of Hankaku Railway, which was nationalized in 1907. With the privatization of the Japan National Railways (JNR) on 1 April 1987, the station came under the aegis of the West Japan Railway Company.

Station numbering was introduced in March 2018 with Aimoto being assigned station number JR-G65

== Passenger statistics ==
In fiscal 2016, the station was used by an average of 203 passengers daily

== Surrounding area ==
- Japan National Route 176

== See also ==
- List of railway stations in Japan
