= Shintetsu Dōjō Station =

Railway station in Kobe, Japan

KB26 Shintetsu Dōjō Station 神鉄道場
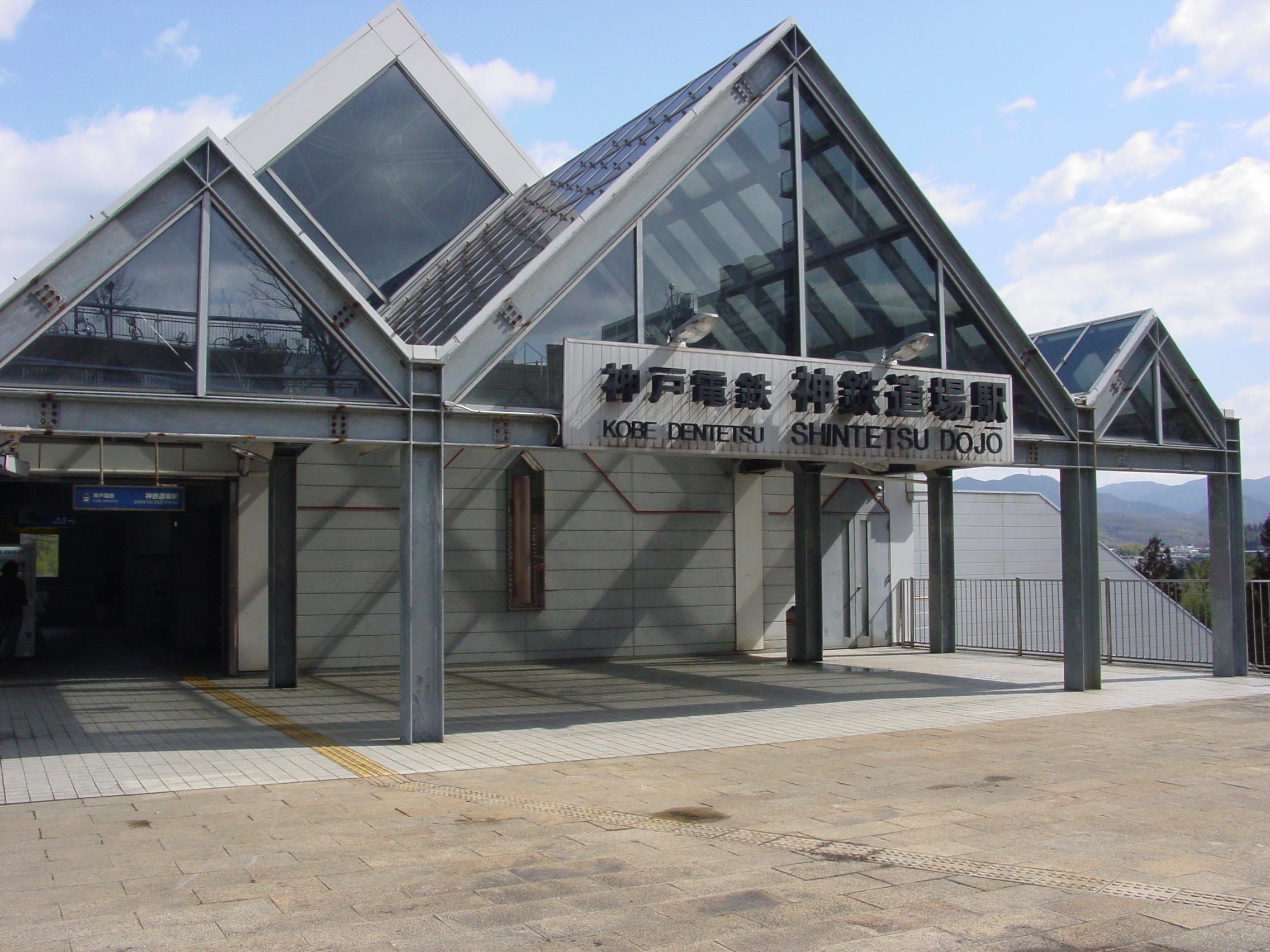
- Station building in 2019

General information
- Location: 742-1 Amagaya, Kusakabe, Dojo-cho, Kita-ku, Kobe-shi Hyōgo-ken; Japan
- Coordinates: 34°51′59.93″N 135°13′33.97″E
- Operator: Kobe Electric Railway (Shintetsu)
- Line: Shintetsu Sanda Line
- Distance: 8.5 km (5.3 miles) from Arimaguchi
- Platforms: 1 side platform

Other information
- Status: Unstaffed
- Station code: KB26
- Website: Official website

History
- Opened: 28 December 1928
- Former names: Dōjō Kawahara Station (to 1991)

Passengers
- FY2019: 1,963
Location
- Location within Hyōgo Prefecture Location within Japan

Shintetsu Dōjō Station (神鉄道場駅, Shintetsu Dōjō-eki) is a passenger railway station located in Kita-ku Kobe, Hyōgo Prefecture, Japan. It is operated by the private transportation company, Kobe Electric Railway (Shintetsu).

== Lines ==
Shintetsu Dōjō Station is served by the Shintetsu Sanda Line, and is located 8.5 kilometers from the terminus of the line at Arimaguchi, 28.5 kilometers from Minatogawa and 28.9 kilometers from Shinkaichi.

== Station layout ==
The station consists of one side platform serving a single bidirectional track. The station building is elevated and is located on the edge of a hill, with a residential area on the west side and a bus stop on the hill directly accessed by stairs from the station building. In anticipation of double-tracking, the platform is designed so that it can be remodeled into an island-type platform with two tracks in the future.

== Adjacent stations ==
«	Service	»
Shintetsu Sanda Line
Dōjō-minamiguchi	Special Rapid Express	Yokoyama
Dōjō-minamiguchi	Express	Yokoyama
Dōjō-minamiguchi	Semi-Express	Yokoyama
Dōjō-minamiguchi	Local	Yokoyama

== History ==
On 18 December 1928, in tandem with the opening of the Sanda Line, Dōjō Kawahara Station (道場川原駅) was opened. It was renamed to its present name of 20 October 1991.

== Passenger statistics ==
In fiscal 2019, the station was used by an average of 1,963 passengers daily

== Surrounding area ==
- Japan National Route 176
- Kobe Municipal Kita-Kobe Junior High School

== See also ==
- List of railway stations in Japan
