= Hirono Station (Hyōgo) =

Railway station in Sanda, Hyōgo Prefecture, Japan

Hirono Station 広野駅
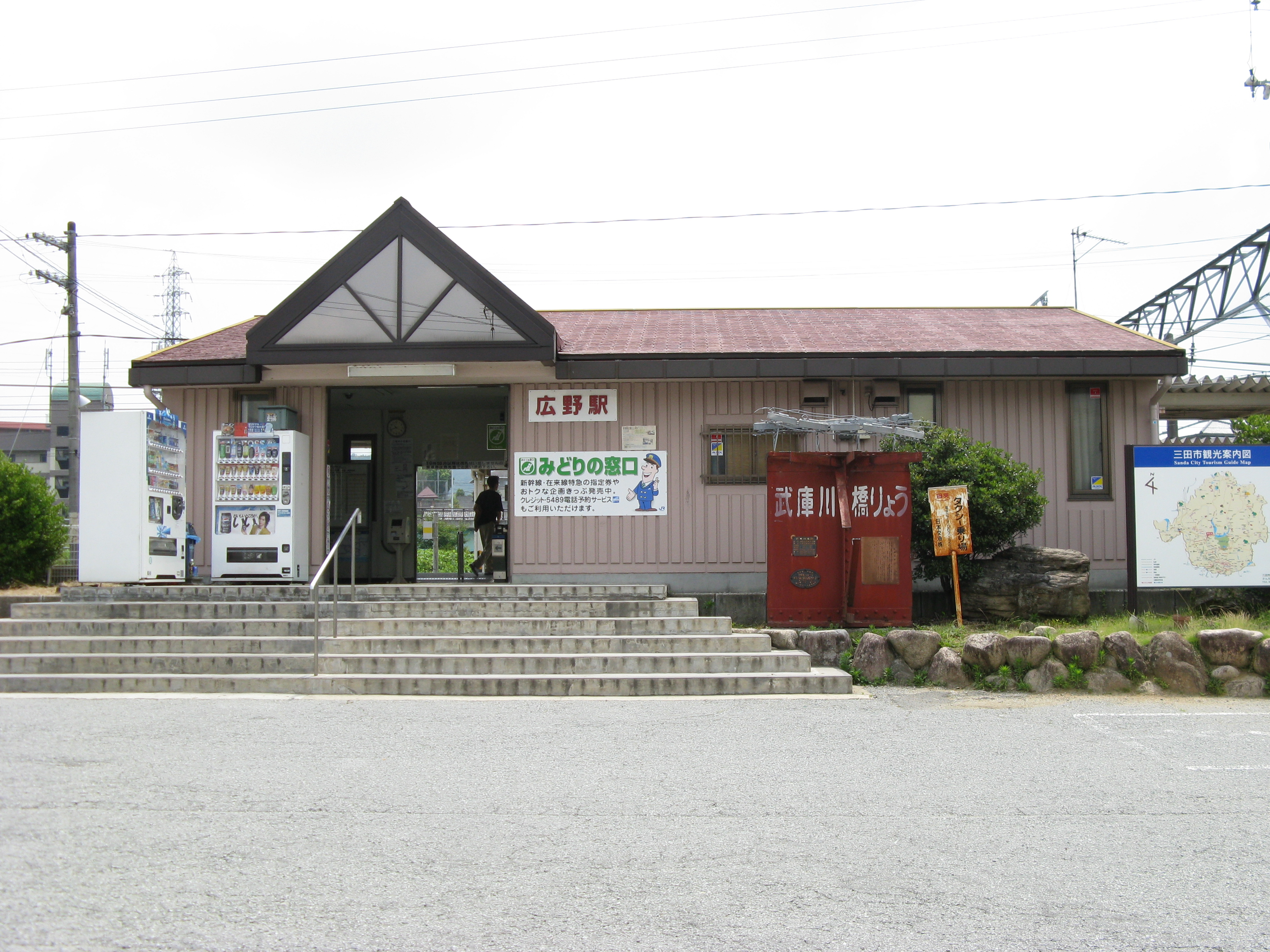
- Hirono Station in July 2008

General information
- Location: Hirono Shimonoma 5-1, Sanda-shi, Hyōgo-ken 669-1331; Japan
- Coordinates: 34°55′42.34″N 135°11′28.59″E
- Owner: West Japan Railway Company
- Operator: West Japan Railway Company
- Lines: Fukuchiyama Line (JR Takarazuka Line)
- Distance: 39.7 km (24.7 miles) from Amagasaki
- Platforms: 1 side + 1 island platform
- Connections: Bus stop

Construction
- Structure type: Ground level
- Accessible: None

Other information
- Status: Staffed (Midori no Madoguchi )
- Station code: JR-G63
- Website: Official website

History
- Opened: 25 March 1899

Passengers
- FY2016: 1159 daily
Location
- Location within Hyōgo Prefecture Location within Japan

Hirono Station (広野駅, Hirono-eki) is a passenger railway station located in the city of Sanda, Hyōgo Prefecture, Japan. It is operated by the West Japan Railway Company (JR West).

== Lines ==
Hirono Station is served by the Fukuchiyama Line (JR Takarazuka Line), and is located 39.7 kilometers from the terminus of the line at Amagasaki and 47.4 kilometers from Osaka.

== Station layout ==
The station consists of one ground-level side platform and one island platform connected to the station building by a footbridge. The station has a Midori no Madoguchi staffed ticket office.

=== Platforms ===
1, 2	■ Fukuchiyama Line (JR Takarazuka Line)	for Sanda and Takarazuka
3	■ Fukuchiyama Line (JR Takarazuka Line)	for Sasayamaguchi and Fukuchiyama

== Adjacent stations ==
«	Service	»
Fukuchiyama Line (JR Takarazuka Line)
Shin-Sanda	Local trains	Aino
Shin-Sanda	Regional Rapid Service	Aino
Shin-Sanda	Rapid Service	Aino
Shin-Sanda	Tambaji Rapid Service	Aino

== History ==
Hirono Station opened on 25 March 1899, as a station of Hankaku Railway, which was nationalized in 1907. With the privatization of the Japan National Railways (JNR) on 1 April 1987, the station came under the aegis of the West Japan Railway Company.

Station numbering was introduced in March 2018 with Hirono being assigned station number JR-G63.

== Passenger statistics ==
In fiscal 2016, the station was used by an average of 1159 passengers daily

== Surrounding area ==
- Sanda City Hirono Civic Center
- Sanda City Hirono Elementary School

== See also ==
- List of railway stations in Japan
