= Renge-ji (Sanda) =

Coordinates: 34.935684°N 135.269173°E

Renge-ji (Japanese: 蓮花寺) is a Shingon sect Buddhist temple in Sanda City, Hyogo, Japan.

== Objects of Worship ==
Amitabha Buddha (Prefecture designated Important Cultural Property).

== History ==
According to the Sanda City website, Renge-ji dates to around 1300.

== Cultural Properties ==
The two storied pagoda is designated a cultural asset by Hyogo prefecture. The original plan of the pagoda, at one tenth scale, is still preserved at the temple. A document found inside the building dates the current structure to 1812 CE.
