= Shin-Sanda Station =

Railway station in Sanda, Hyōgo Prefecture, Japan

Shin-Sanda Station 新三田駅
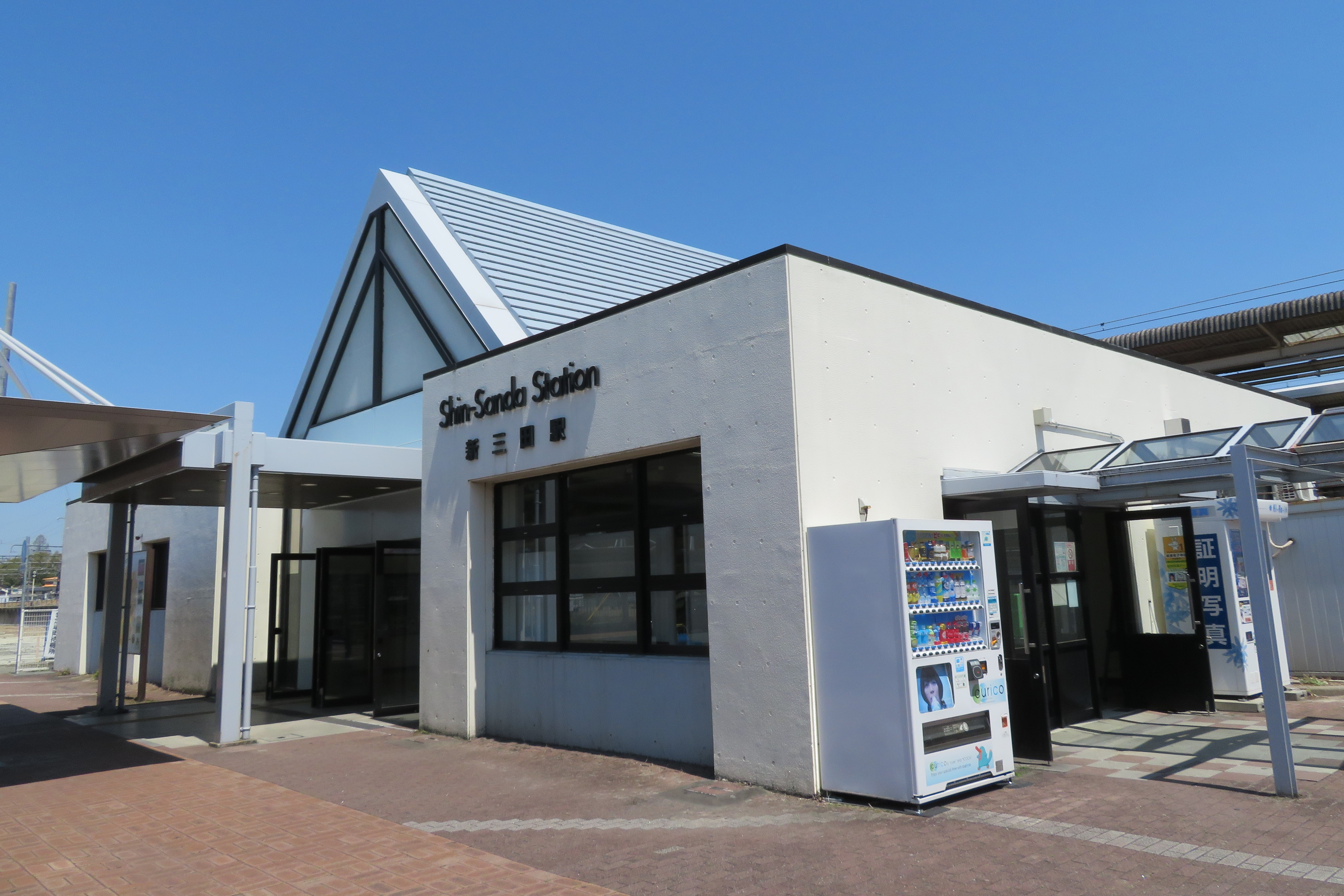
- Shin-Sanda Station Station in April 2020

General information
- Location: Fukushima, Sanda-shi, Hyōgo-ken 669-1313; Japan
- Coordinates: 34°54′36.4″N 135°12′30.07″E
- Owner: West Japan Railway Company
- Operator: West Japan Railway Company
- Lines: Fukuchiyama Line (JR Takarazuka Line)
- Distance: 36.9 km (22.9 miles) from Amagasaki
- Platforms: 2 island platforms
- Tracks: 4
- Connections: Bus stop

Construction
- Structure type: Ground level
- Accessible: Yes

Other information
- Status: Staffed (Midori no Madoguchi )
- Station code: JR-G62
- Website: Official website

History
- Opened: November 1, 1986

Passengers
- FY2016: 14,694 daily
Location
- Location within Hyōgo Prefecture Location within Japan

Shin-Sanda Station (新三田駅, Shin-Sanda-eki) is a passenger railway station located in the city of Sanda, Hyōgo Prefecture, Japan. It is operated by the West Japan Railway Company (JR West).

== Lines ==
Shin-Sanda Station is served by the Fukuchiyama Line (JR Takarazuka Line), and is located 36.9 kilometers from the terminus of the line at Amagasaki and 44.6 kilometers from Osaka.

== Station layout ==
The station consists of two island platforms serving four tracks. The platforms are on am embankment, and the concourse and platform are connected by an underpass and an overpass. As part of barrier-free access, an elevator is installed on the overpass.The two outer lines (Platforms 1 and 4) are the main line, and the two inner lines (Platforms 2 and 3) are the outbound sub-main lines.. Trains arriving at and departing from Sasayamaguchi Station and Fukuchiyama Station stop at (or pass by) outside Platforms 1 and 4 except during the morning rush hour. The station has a Midori no Madoguchi staffed ticket office.

=== Platforms ===
1, 2	■ Fukuchiyama Line (JR Takarazuka Line)	for Sasayamaguchi and Fukuchiyama
3, 4	■ Fukuchiyama Line (JR Takarazuka Line)	for Sanda and Takarazuka

== Adjacent stations ==
«	Service	»
Fukuchiyama Line (JR Takarazuka Line)
Sanda	Local	Hirono
Sanda	Regional Rapid Service	Hirono
Sanda	Rapid Service	Hirono
Sanda	Tambaji Rapid Service	Hirono
Sanda	Kounotori	Hirono

== History ==
Shin-Sanda Station opened on 1 November 1986.

Station numbering was introduced in March 2018 with Shin-Sanda being assigned station number JR-G62.

== Passenger statistics ==
In fiscal 2016, the station was used by an average of 14,694 passengers daily

== Surrounding area ==
- Woody Town
- Culture Town
- Sanda Industrial Park
- Sanda Municipal Hospital

== See also ==
- List of railway stations in Japan
