= Sanda, Hyōgo =

Sanda 三田市
- City
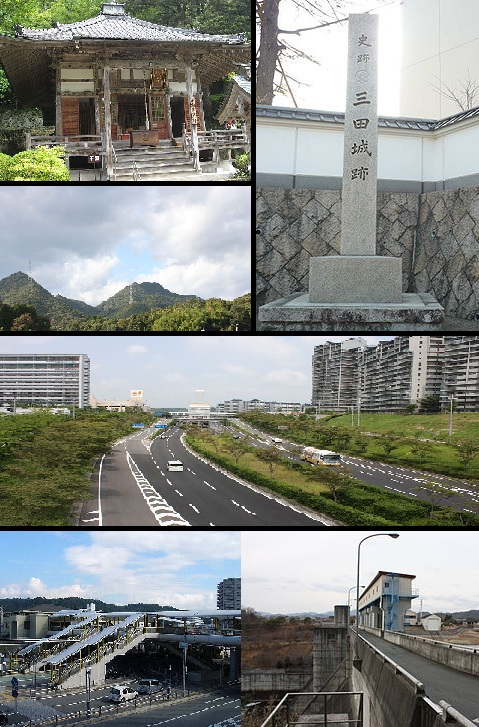
- top left:Bodai-ji; right: Sanda Castle 2nd row: Sanda Castle; 3rd row:Hokusetsu Sanda New Town 4th row left:JR Sanda Station; right:Aono Dam

- Flag Seal
- Location of Sanda in Hyōgo Prefecture

- Location in Japan
- Coordinates: 34°53′N 135°14′E
- Country: Japan
- Region: Kansai
- Prefecture: Hyōgo

Government
  - Mayor: Katsuya Tamura

Area
  - Total: 210.32 km^{2} (81.21 sq mi)

Population (November 1, 2021)
  - Total: 108,452
  - Density: 515.65/km^{2} (1,335.5/sq mi)
- Time zone: UTC+09:00 (JST)
- City hall address: 2-1-1, Miwa, Sanda-shi, Hyōgo-ken; 669-1595
- Climate: Cfa
- Website: Official website
- Symbols
- Bird: Green pheasant
- Flower: Satsuki azalea
- Tree: Japanese red pine

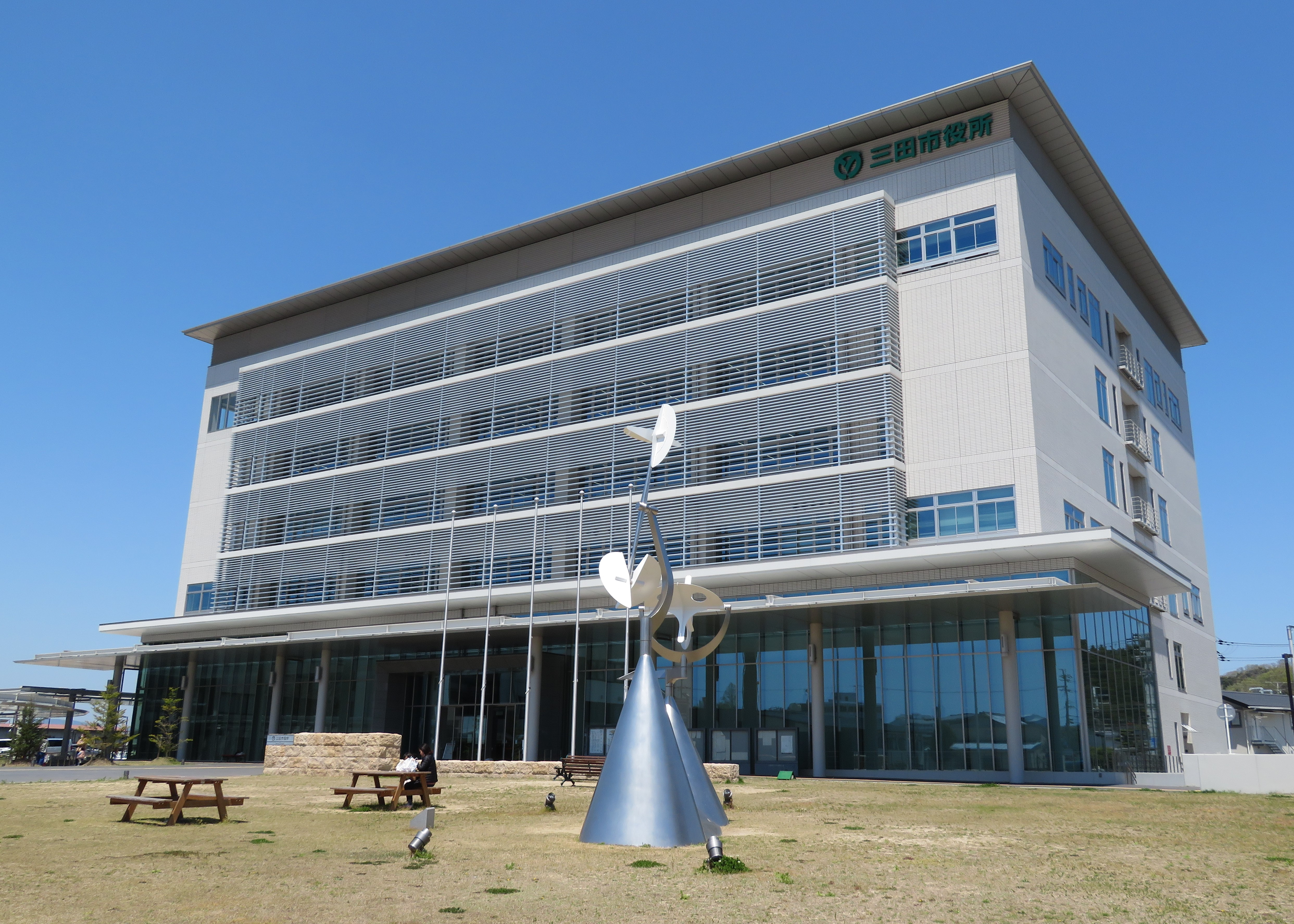
Sanda City Office

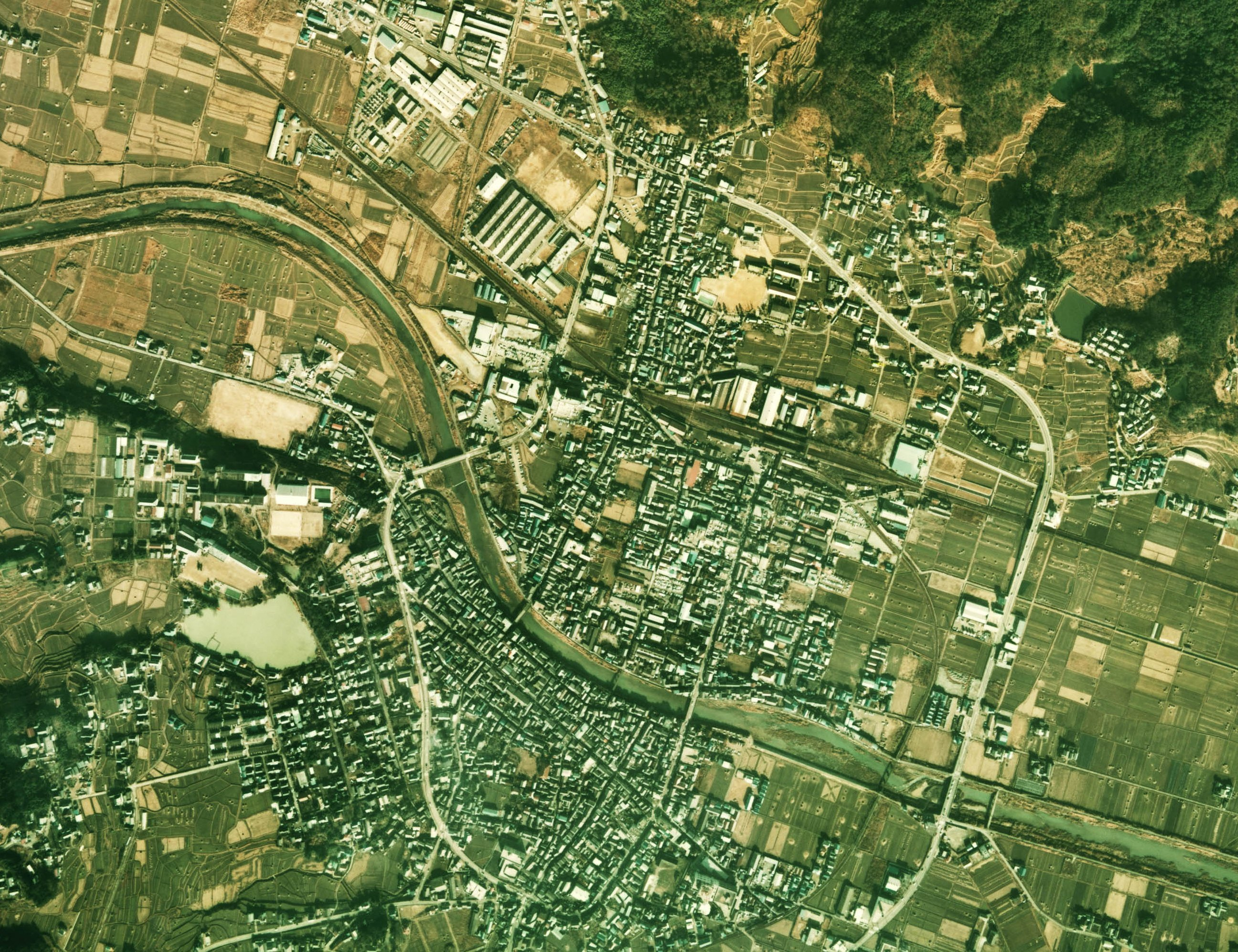
Aerial view of Sanda city center in 1974

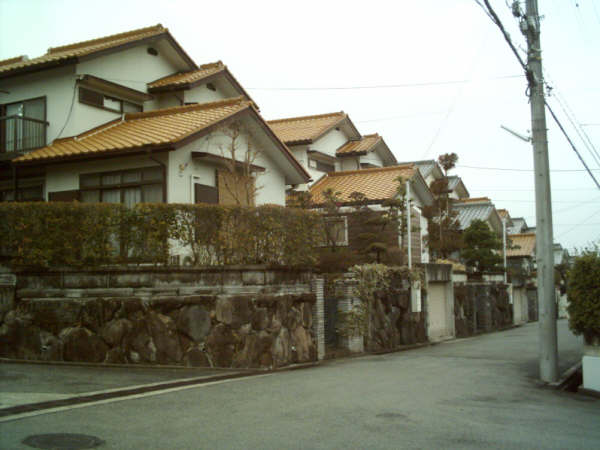
Residential street in Sanda

Sanda (三田市, Sanda-shi) is a city located in Hyōgo Prefecture, Japan. As of 1 November 2022, the city had an estimated population of 108,452 in 47,018 households and a population density of 520 persons per km^{2}. The total area of the city is 210.32 square kilometres (81.21 sq mi).

== Geography ==
Sanda City is located in southeast Hyōgo Prefecture, about 25 kilometres (16 mi) to the north of the city of Kobe beyond the Rokkō Mountains and about 35 kilometres (22 mi) northwest of the city of Osaka. The highest elevation point in the city is 697 metres (2,287 ft) at Mt. Mine, and the lowest elevation point is 116 metres (381 ft). The northern and eastern parts of the city are mountainous. In the past, it had the appearance of a typical farming village with rural scenery, but due to the development of large-scale housing complexes since the 1980s and the convenience of double-track electrification of the JR Fukuchiyama Line, it has rapidly become a satellite city of Osaka and Kobe.

=== Rivers ===
The Muko River runs through Sanda from Sasayama City in the north to Osaka Bay in the southeast. The size of the drainage basin is 496 km^{2}. The river is host to events and festivals throughout the year.

=== Neighbouring municipalities ===
Hyōgo Prefecture

- Inagawa
- Katō
- Kobe
- Miki
- Takarazuka
- Tamba-Sasayama

=== Climate ===
Sanda has a humid subtropical climate (Köppen climate classification Cfa) with hot summers and cool to cold winters. Precipitation is significantly higher in summer than in winter, though on the whole lower than most parts of Honshū, and there is no significant snowfall. The average annual temperature in Sanda is 14.1 °C (57.4 °F). The average annual rainfall is 1,281.8 mm (50.46 in) with July as the wettest month. The temperatures are highest on average in August, at around 26.4 °C (79.5 °F), and lowest in January, at around 2.5 °C (36.5 °F). The highest temperature ever recorded in Sanda was 38.4 °C (101.1 °F) on 8 August 1994; the coldest temperature ever recorded was −10.6 °C (12.9 °F) on 23 December 2005.

Climate data for Sanda (1991−2020 normals, extremes 1978−present)
Month	Jan	Feb	Mar	Apr	May	Jun	Jul	Aug	Sep	Oct	Nov	Dec	Year
Record high °C (°F)	17.4 (63.3)	20.8 (69.4)	22.9 (73.2)	29.1 (84.4)	31.4 (88.5)	35.2 (95.4)	37.2 (99.0)	38.4 (101.1)	36.8 (98.2)	32.1 (89.8)	25.3 (77.5)	22.1 (71.8)	38.4 (101.1)
Mean daily maximum °C (°F)	7.7 (45.9)	8.7 (47.7)	12.6 (54.7)	18.5 (65.3)	23.5 (74.3)	26.5 (79.7)	30.2 (86.4)	31.8 (89.2)	27.4 (81.3)	21.7 (71.1)	16.0 (60.8)	10.3 (50.5)	19.6 (67.2)
Daily mean °C (°F)	2.5 (36.5)	3.3 (37.9)	6.8 (44.2)	12.3 (54.1)	17.5 (63.5)	21.6 (70.9)	25.5 (77.9)	26.4 (79.5)	22.3 (72.1)	16.1 (61.0)	10.0 (50.0)	4.7 (40.5)	14.1 (57.3)
Mean daily minimum °C (°F)	−2.2 (28.0)	−1.8 (28.8)	1.0 (33.8)	5.9 (42.6)	11.4 (52.5)	17.1 (62.8)	21.6 (70.9)	22.1 (71.8)	17.9 (64.2)	11.0 (51.8)	4.4 (39.9)	−0.4 (31.3)	9.0 (48.2)
Record low °C (°F)	−10.1 (13.8)	−9.5 (14.9)	−6.3 (20.7)	−2.8 (27.0)	−1.2 (29.8)	7.0 (44.6)	12.6 (54.7)	14.1 (57.4)	7.6 (45.7)	0.1 (32.2)	−3.7 (25.3)	−10.6 (12.9)	−10.6 (12.9)
Average precipitation mm (inches)	41.7 (1.64)	52.6 (2.07)	92.8 (3.65)	94.7 (3.73)	125.5 (4.94)	165.1 (6.50)	171.1 (6.74)	128.4 (5.06)	165.5 (6.52)	127.5 (5.02)	66.5 (2.62)	50.4 (1.98)	1,281.8 (50.46)
Average precipitation days (≥ 1.0 mm)	5.8	6.8	9.8	9.4	10.1	11.4	10.5	8.4	10.3	8.5	6.4	6.6	104
Mean monthly sunshine hours	134.6	128.9	157.8	181.2	182.9	131.9	148.4	198.7	146.7	158.5	143.2	140.5	1,853.3
Source: Japan Meteorological Agency

== Demographics ==
Per Japanese census data, the population of Sanda in 2020 was 109,238 people. Sanda has been conducting censuses since 1920.

Historical population
Year	Pop.	±%
1920	22,008	—
1925	22,238	+1.0%
1930	23,513	+5.7%
1935	23,212	−1.3%
1940	24,282	+4.6%
1945	33,145	+36.5%
1950	33,211	+0.2%
1955	33,667	+1.4%
1960	32,528	−3.4%
1965	32,265	−0.8%
1970	33,090	+2.6%
1975	35,261	+6.6%
1980	36,529	+3.6%
1985	40,716	+11.5%
1990	64,560	+58.6%
1995	96,279	+49.1%
2000	111,737	+16.1%
2005	113,572	+1.6%
2010	114,220	+0.6%
2015	112,691	−1.3%
2020	109,238	−3.1%
Sanda population statistics

== History ==
The area of Sanda was part of ancient Settsu Province, and has been inhabited since the Japanese Paleolithic period. The name "Sanda" has been in use since long ago. Records found within a Buddhist Maitreya statue in the ancient Konshin-ji Temple read: "These areas are decreed as Matsuyama's land, which includes Onden, Hiden and Keiden, which are three rice fields, and the land is thus renamed Sanda." In Japanese, "san" means three and "ta" (pronounced "da" following "n") means rice field. The earliest document on record which refers to Sanda is from 1477.

Sanda Castle was erected during the Muromachi period. A castle town later developed during the Azuchi-Momoyama period, and under the Edo Period Tokugawa shogunate. Sanda was the center of the 36,000 koku Sanda Domain, ruled through most of its history by the Kuki clan.

Following the Meiji restoration, the town of Sanda was established with the creation of the modern municipalities system. The town prospered thanks to the completion of a railroad system which connected the town and the surrounding areas. In 1956, the towns of Miwa, Hirono, Ono, and Takahira merged into the town of Sanda. Finally, Sanda annexed Aino, itself a merger of towns Ai and Honjō, in 1957. Sanda was upgraded from a town to a city on July 1, 1958.

== Government ==
Sanda has a mayor-council form of government with a directly elected mayor and a unicameral city council of 22 members. Sanda contributes two members to the Hyōgo Prefectural Assembly. In terms of national politics, the city is within Hyōgo 5th districts of the lower house of the Diet of Japan.

=== General hospitals ===
- Sanda City Hospital/Keyakidai
- Hyogo Chuo Hospital/Ohara

== Economy ==
Sanda has a mixed economy of commerce, light manufacturing and agriculture. It is increasingly a commuter town for Osaka and Kobe.

=== Industries ===
Mitsubishi Electric (Melco) has a large R&D and production campus in Sanda. Many large industries in Sanda city are concentrated in the Hokusetsu Sanda Technopark. The industries represented primarily include pharmaceuticals, chemicals, food, and distribution. Some specific companies based in the Technopark are:

- Iris Ohyama (Plastics/chemicals)
- Morita (fire engine manufacturing)
- Asahi Foods (food)
- Soft99 Corporation (car wax/chemicals)
- Nippon Polyester (polyester/chemicals)
- Hayashi (tower/chemicals)
- Kishida Chemical (chemicals)
- Tamapori (polystyrene/chemicals)
- Kiribai Kobayashi (drug-manufacturing, disposable heating pad/chemicals)
- Hokuseisha (printing)
- Sastech (stainless steel)
- Ueno Drug (drug/chemicals)

== Education ==
Sanda has 20 public elementary schools, nine public middle schools and four high schools operated by the city government, and four public high schools operated by the Hyōgo Prefectural Board of Education. In addition, the prefecture also operates two special education schools for the handicapped. The Minatogawa College, a junior college, is located in the city

=== High schools (grades 10-12) ===
- Arima High School
- Hokusetsu Sanda High School
- Sanda Gakuen High School (private)
- Sanda Seiryo High School
- Sanda Shounkan High School
- Sanda Shosei High School (private)

=== Junior high schools (grades 7-9) ===
- Ai Junior High School
- Fuji Junior High School
- Hakkei Junior High School
- Hasama Junior High School
- Keyakidai Junior High School
- Nagasaka Junior High School
- Sanda Gakuen Junior High School (private)
- Uenodai Junior High School
- Yurinokidai Junior High School

=== Elementary schools (grades 1-6) ===
- Ai Elementary School
- Akashiadai Elementary School
- Fuji Elementary School
- Gakuen Elementary School
- Hasama Elementary School
- Hirono Elementary School
- Honjyo Elementary School
- Keyakidai Elementary School
- Matsugaoka Elementary School
- Miwa Elementary School
- Muko Elementary School
- Moushi Elementary School
- Ono Elementary School
- Sanda Elementary School
- Shidehara Elementary School
- Suzukakedai Elementary School
- Takahira Elementary School
- Tsutsujigaoka Elementary School
- Yayoi Elementary School
- Yurinokidai Elementary School

=== Special schools ===
- Hyogo Prefectural Koto High School for Students with Special Needs
- Uenogahara Special School

=== Libraries ===
Sanda has three libraries:

- Sanda-Ai Library
- Sanda City Library
- Sanda Woodytown Library

Sanda city also has a mobile library called "Soyokaze". It began service on January 19, 1994 and has about 3,500 books.

== Transportation ==
=== Railways ===
JR West - Fukuchiyama Line

- Sanda - Shin-Sanda - Hirono - Aino - Aimoto

Kobe Electric Railway - Shintetsu Sanda Line

- Yokoyama - Sanda Honmachi - Sanda

Kobe Electric Railway - Shintetsu Kōen-Toshi Line

- Yokoyama - Flower Town - Minami Woody Town - Woody Town Chuo

=== Highways ===
- Maizuru-Wakasa Expressway
- Chūgoku Expressway
- Hanshin Expressway Ikeda Route
  - National Route 176

== Sister cities ==
Sanda is twinned with:

- Blue Mountains, Australia
- Jeju City, South Korea
- Kittitas County, United States

== Local attractions ==
- Museum of Nature and Human Activities

The museum's theme is the "symbiosis of people and nature". It opened in Flowertown on October 10, 1992, and is known as "Hitohaku" in Japanese. It is one of the largest public museums in Japan.

- Renge-ji, a Shingon sect Buddhist temple
- Satonone Hall

Satonone Hall is a large performance venue in Sanda. It was completed in March 2007. The facility features a large hall, small hall, rehearsal rooms, and display rooms. The interior is decorated in soft tones and motifs symbolic of the harvest of Satoyama, persimmons, ears of rice, water, and wind.

- Hanayamano-yu

An outdoor bath which features hinoki and an arrangement of garden rocks. There are separate baths for men and women.

- Kumanonosato

Features both Bali-style and Japanese-style outdoor baths.

- Arima Fuji Park

Located in Fukushima, Sanda and opened in 2001. The park is named for Mt. Arima Fuji, which is located within the park. There are three parks within the park: a waterfront park, a forest park, and a grassland park.

- Shiroyama

A multi-use sports facility featuring a tennis court, ball park, athletic field, and gym.

=== Events ===
- Sanda Matsuri

Sanda Matsuri is the largest annual event in Sanda. There is a large firework display with over 2,500 fireworks. It takes place on August 4 near the Muko River.

- Hyakkoku Odori

Hyakkoku Odori takes place in late November near the Komausahachiman Shrine.

- Sanda Akindo Matsuri

Sanda Akindo Matsuri takes place in early December in the shopping district in front of Sanda station.

- Sanda Nōgyō Matsuri

Sanda Nōgyō Matsuri takes place on November 3 and 4.

- Tenjinsai

Tenjinsai takes place in late July in Sanda Tenman Shrine. In the morning, there is a festival, followed by a special lion dance in the afternoon.

=== Special products ===
- Sanda beef

Sanda beef (三田牛, Sanda-gyū) has historically been produced in Hyōgo at the rate of about 1,000 heads of cattle per year. It is regarded as being of higher quality than Kobe beef.

- Mōshi tea

Mōshi tea is produced in May and June and is shipped to points all over Japan. It is sold at local stores as well, such as Paskaru-Sanda, Itunoeki-Inagawa, Kumazeinosato and Kobe-sogou.

== Notable people from Sanda ==
- Itokin ET-KING (musician)
- Hayashi Keisuke (Vissel Kobe)
- Kawamoto Kōmin (Rangaku scholar)
- Konoda Reo (pro-baseball player・Fukuoka SoftBank Hawks)
- Aida Shinnichi (singer-songwriter)
- Nanjo Yuka (model)
