= Gosha Station =

Railway station in Kobe, Japan

KB21 Gosha Station 五社駅
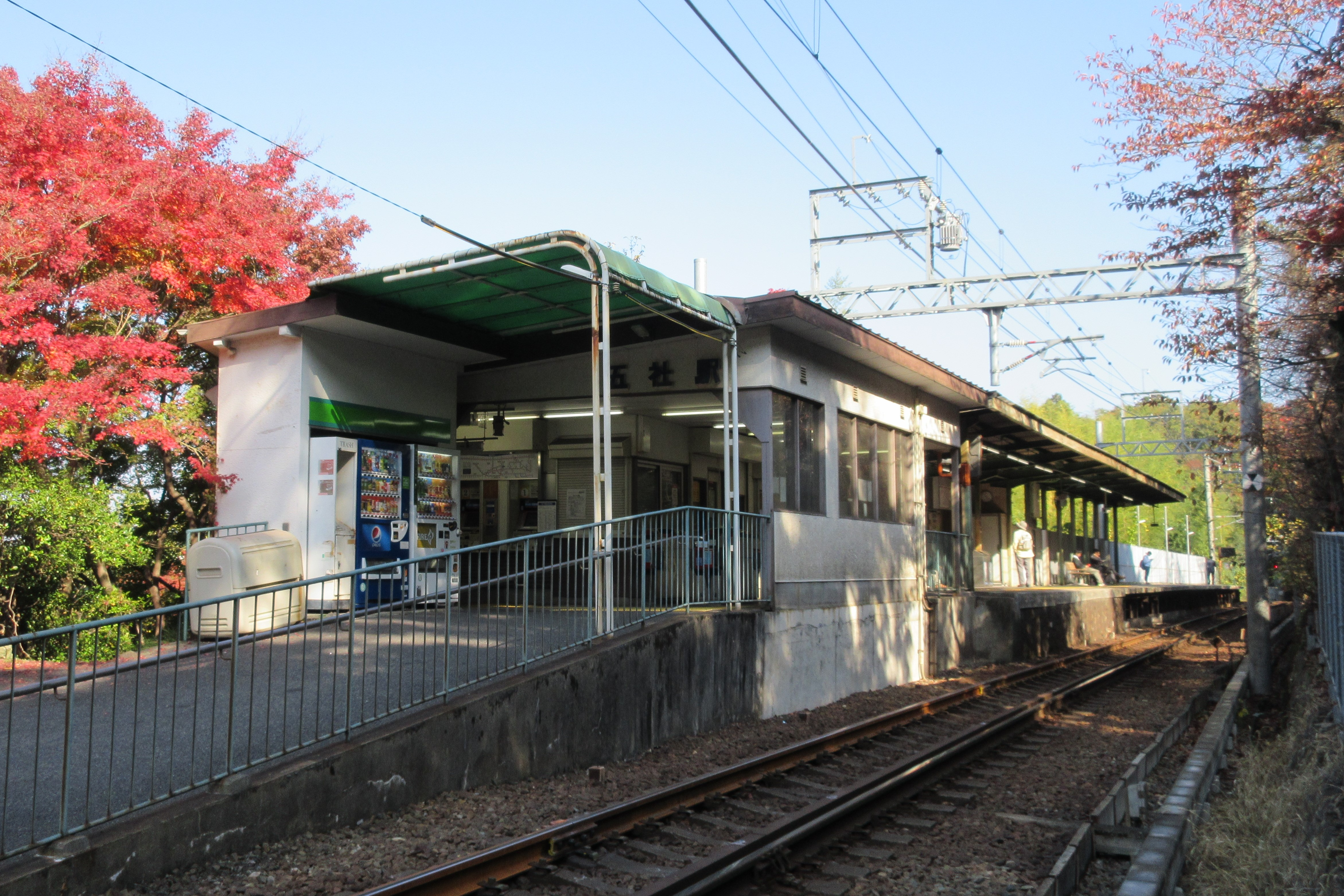
- Station building in November 2018

General information
- Location: Arino Arinocho,, Kita-ku, Kobe-shi Hyōgo-ken 651-1312; Japan
- Coordinates: 34°48′21.95″N 135°12′58.41″E
- Operator: Kobe Electric Railway (Shintetsu)
- Line: Shintetsu Sanda Line
- Distance: 1.4 km (0.87 miles) from Arimaguchi
- Platforms: 1 side platform

Other information
- Status: Unstaffed
- Station code: KB21
- Website: Official website

History
- Opened: 28 December 1928

Passengers
- FY2019: 1,914
Location
- Location within Hyōgo Prefecture Location within Japan

Gosha Station (五社駅, Gosha-eki) is a passenger railway station located in Kita-ku Kobe, Hyōgo Prefecture, Japan. It is operated by the private transportation company, Kobe Electric Railway (Shintetsu).

== Lines ==
Gosha Station is served by the Shintetsu Sanda Line, and is located 1.4 kilometers from the terminus of the line at Arimaguchi, 21.4 kilometers from Minatogawa and 21.8 kilometers from Shinkaichi.

== Station layout ==
The station consists of one side platform serving a single bidirectional track. The station is unattended.

== Adjacent stations ==
«	Service	»
Shintetsu Sanda Line
Special Rapid Express for Shinkaichi: Does not stop at this station
Arimaguchi	Express	Okaba
Arimaguchi	Semi-Express	Okaba
Arimaguchi	Local	Okaba

== History ==
On 18 December 1928, Gosha Station was opened in tandem with the opening of the Sanda Line.

== Passenger statistics ==
In fiscal 2019, the station was used by an average of 1,914 passengers daily

== Surrounding area ==
- Arino River
- Hyogo Prefectural Route 15 Kobe Sanda Line (Arima Highway)

== See also ==
- List of railway stations in Japan
