= Shintetsu Kōen-Toshi Line =

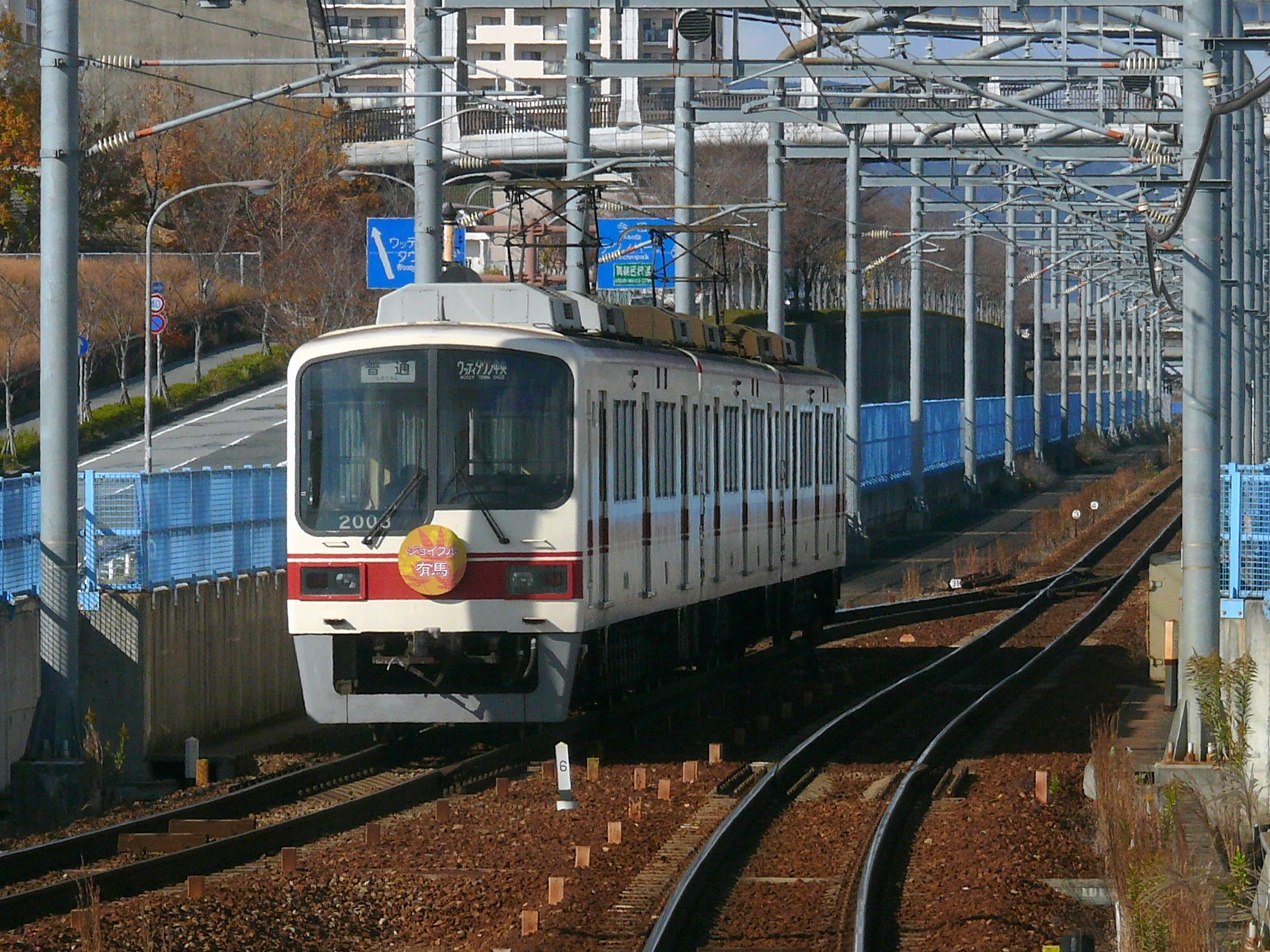
- Woody Town Chūō-bound train departing Minami Woody Town, 2003

Overview
- Status: Operational
- Locale: Sanda, Hyōgo Prefecture
- Termini: Yokoyama; Woody Town Chūō
- Continues as: Sanda Line (from Yokoyama)
- Stations: 4

Service
- Type: Heavy rail
- Route number: KB

History
- Opened: October 28, 1991 (Yokoyama - Flower Town); March 28, 1996 (Flower Town - Woody Town Chūō)

Technical
- Line length: 5.5 km (3.4 mi)
- Track gauge: 1,067 mm (3 ft 6 in)
- Electrification: 1500 V DC overhead catenary
- Operating speed: 80 km/h (50 mph)

The Kōen-Toshi Line (公園都市線, Kōen-Toshi-sen) is a commuter railway line in Sanda, Hyōgo Prefecture operated by Kobe Electric Railway.

The line is 5.5 kilometres (3.4 mi) long, connecting Yokoyama to Woody Town Chūō. Although Yokoyama is the line terminus, all trains continue on the Sanda Line to Sanda.

== History ==
The Yokoyama - Flower Town section opened in 1991, 1,067 mm (3 ft 6 in) gauge and electrified at 1500 VDC. The line was extended to Woody Town Chūō in 1996.

The line is single track, but the corridor allows for duplication if required in the future.

== Stations ==
No.	Station		Connections	Location
↑ Through Service via the Shintetsu Sanda Line to/from Sanda ↑
KB27	Yokoyama	横山	Sanda Line (Through Service)	Sanda
KB31	Flower Town	フラワータウン		Sanda
KB32	Minami Woody Town	南ウッディタウン		Sanda
KB33	Woody Town Chūō	ウッディタウン中央		Sanda

== Ridership ==
Average daily passenger numbers
Year	Total (% increase)	Yokoyama	Flower Town	Minami Woody Town	Woody Town Chuo	Source
1997	7,350	1,979	3,779	800	792	
1998	7,536 (+2.5%)	1,976	3,762	866	932	
1999	7,558 (+0.3%)	1,943	3,713	888	1,014	
2000	7,950 (+5.2%)	1,948	3,744	891	1,367	
2001	7,905 (-0.6%)	1,793	3,752	848	1,512	
2002	7,753 (-1.9%)	1,908	3,646	778	1,421	
2003	7,647 (-1.4%)	1,900	3,546	768	1,433	
2004	7,492 (-2.0%)	1,862	3,417	744	1,469	
2005	7,348 (-1.9%)	1,793	3,312	778	1,465	
2006	7,229 (-1.6%)	1,790	3,252	799	1,388	
2007	7,164 (-0.9%)	1,806	3,260	800	1,298	
2008	7,138 (-0.4%)	1,813	3,221	793	1,311	
2009	7,011 (-1.8%)	1,787	3,107	767	1,350	
2010	7,096 (+1.2%)	1,837	3,091	782	1,386	
2011	7,299 (+2.9%)	1,923	3,099	818	1,459	
2012	7,393 (+1.4%)	2,005	3,049	840	1,499	
2013	7,654 (+3.5%)	2,123	3,089	869	1,573	
2014	7,544 (-1.4%)	2,121	2,978	867	1,578	
