= Minatogawa College =

Higher education institution in Hyōgo Prefecture, Japan

Coordinates: 34°56′56.9″N 135°9′30.3″E

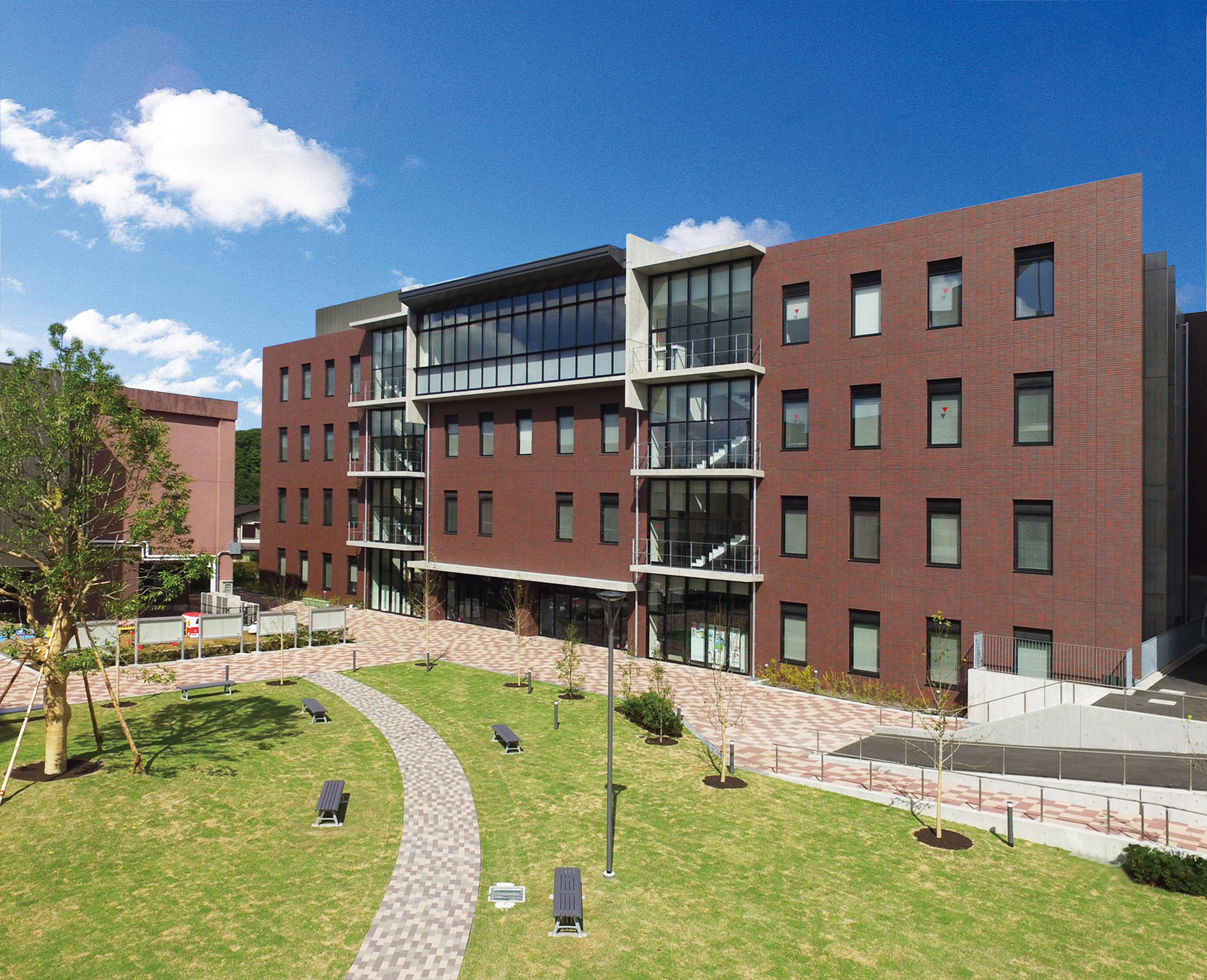

Minatogawa College (湊川短期大学, Minatogawa tanki daigaku) is a private junior college in Sanda, Hyōgo, Japan, established in 1952.
