= Woody Town Chūō Station =

Railway station in Sanda, Hyōgo Prefecture, Japan

KB33 Woody Town Chūō ウッディタウン中央駅
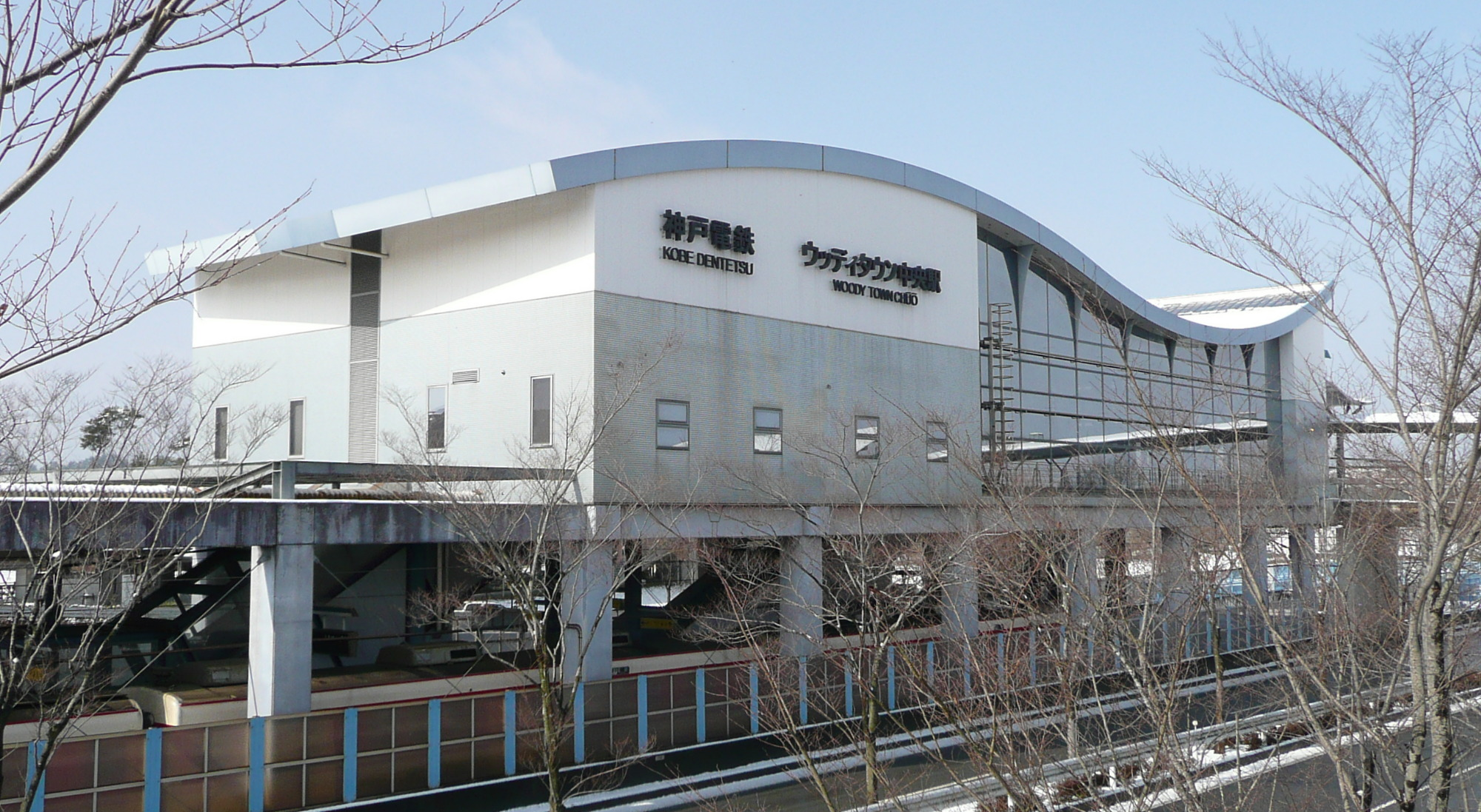
- Woody Town Chūō Station building

General information
- Location: 1-102 Yurinokidai, Sanda-shi, Hyōgo-ken; Japan
- Coordinates: 34°54′35.40″N 135°11′0.92″E
- Elevation: 200 m (660 ft)
- Operator: Kobe Electric Railway (Shintetsu)
- Line: Shintetsu Kōen-Toshi Line
- Distance: 5.5 km (3.4 miles) from Yokoyama
- Platforms: 1 island platform
- Tracks: 2

Other information
- Status: Unstaffed
- Station code: KB33
- Website: Official website

History
- Opened: 28 March 1996

Passengers
- 2019: 2,583

Services
Preceding station	Kobe Electric Railway	Following station
Terminus	Kōen-Toshi Line	Minami Woody Town KB32 towards Yokoyama
Location
- Location within Hyōgo Prefecture Location within Japan

Woody Town Chūō Station (ウッディタウン中央駅, Uddi-taun Chūō-eki) is a passenger railway station located in the city of Sanda, Hyōgo Prefecture, Japan. It is operated by the private transportation company, Kobe Electric Railway (Shintetsu).

== Lines ==
Woody Town Chūō Station is served by the Shintetsu Kōen-Toshi Line, and is located 2.3 kilometers from the terminus of the line at Yokoyama and 4.3 kilometers from Sanda.

== Station layout ==
The station consists of one deadheaded island platform serving two tracks. The effective length of the platform is five cars, but normally only three-car trains are operated. The station is unattended.

=== Platforms ===
1, 2	■ Koen-Toshi Line	for Sanda (Change trains at Yokoyama for Shinkaichi, Arima Onsen, Tanigami and Shin-Kobe)

== History ==
The station opened on March 28, 1996 as the terminus of the Kōen-Toshi Line extension from Flower Town.

In 2001, the station was selected as one of Best 100 Stations in Kinki Region by the Ministry of Land, Infrastructure, Transport and Tourism.

== Passenger statistics ==
In fiscal 2019, the station was used by an average of 2,583 passengers daily

== Surrounding area ==
The station is part of the Kobe-Sanda International Park City, with the surrounding area both commercial and residential.

- ÆON Woody Town
- Century Plaza-mae Bus stop (for Kobe Airport, Sannomiya and others)
- Hyogo Prefectural Route 720 Techno Park Sanda Route

== See also ==
- List of railway stations in Japan
