= Yokoyama Station (Hyōgo) =

Railway station in Sanda, Hyōgo Prefecture, Japan

KB27 Yokoyama Station 横山駅
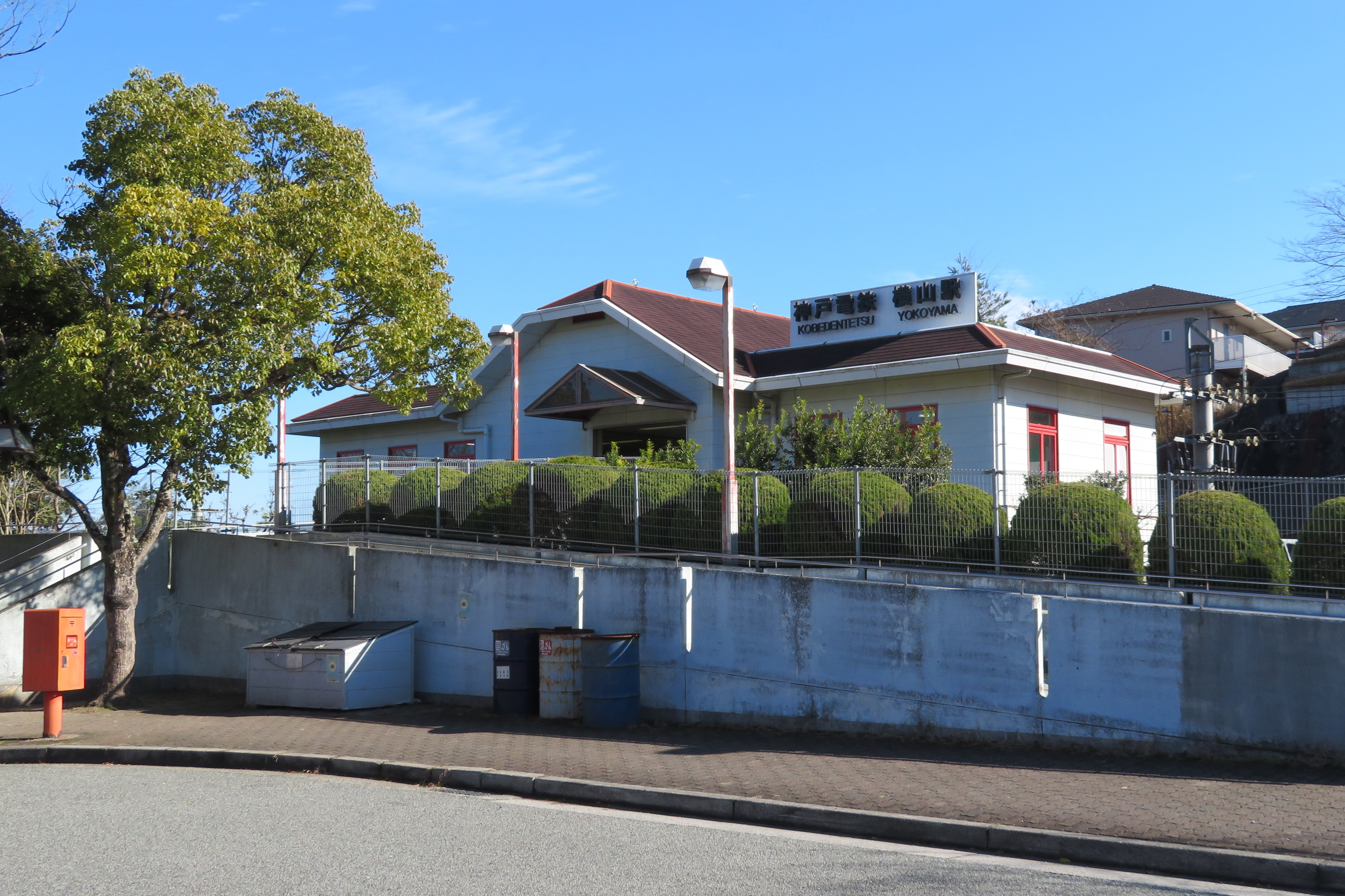
- Station building in 2019

General information
- Location: 2-9 Minamigaoka, Sanda-shi, Hyōgo-ken 669-1535; Japan
- Coordinates: 34°52′36.79″N 135°13′12.07″E
- Operator: Kobe Electric Railway (Shintetsu)
- Line: Shintetsu Sanda Line
- Distance: 10.0 km (6.2 miles) from Arimaguchi
- Platforms: 1 island platform

Other information
- Status: Unstaffed
- Station code: KB27
- Website: Official website

History
- Opened: 28 December 1928
- Former names: Dentetsu Yokoyama Station (to 1990)

Passengers
- 2019: 3,708

Services
Preceding station	Kobe Electric Railway	Following station
Shintetsu Dōjō KB26 towards Arimaguchi	Sanda Line Special Rapid Express	Sanda Honmachi One-way operation
Shintetsu Dōjō KB26 towards Arimaguchi	Sanda Line Rapid Semi Express Local	Sanda Honmachi KB28 towards Sanda
Flower Town KB31 towards Woody Town Chūō	Kōen-Toshi Line	Terminus
Location
- Location within Hyōgo Prefecture Location within Japan

Yokoyama Station (横山駅, Yokoyama-eki) is a passenger railway station located in the city of Sanda, Hyōgo Prefecture, Japan. It is operated by the private transportation company, Kobe Electric Railway (Shintetsu).

== Lines ==
Yokoyama Station is served by the Shintetsu Sanda Line, and is located 10.0 kilometers from the terminus of the line at Arimaguchi, 30.0 kilometers from Minatogawa and 30.4 kilometers from Shinkaichi. It is also the terminus of the 5.5 kilometer Shintetsu Kōen-Toshi Line to Woody Town Chūō

== Station layout ==
The station consists of one island platform serving two tracks, located in a cutting, and connected to the station building by footbridges.The Sanda side from this station is a double track shared by the Sanda Line and the Kōen-Toshi Line, but on the Shinkaichi/Woody Town central side, two single tracks run in different directions. The track extending from this station to the Shinkaichi side draws a sharp curve, so trains arriving and departing from the Shinkaichi side slow down. The trains on the Kōen-Toshi Line go into a tunnel as soon as they leave the station, but since the track is connected to Platform 1 in a straight line, trains bound for Sanda from the Kōen-Toshi Line often enter the line without slowing down. A connecting line is also installed on the Sanda side so that trains from the Sanda direction can turn back.

=== Platforms ===
1	■ Sanda Line (including the Koen-Toshi Line)	for Sanda
2	■ Sanda Line	for Shinkaichi, Arima Onsen, Ao and Shin-Kobe
2	■ Koen-Toshi Line	for Woody Town Chuo

== History ==
On 18 December 1928, in tandem with the opening of the Sanda Line, Dentetsu Yokoyama Station (電鉄横山駅) was opened. It was renamed to Yokoyama in 1990.

The line was double-tracked between Yokoyama and Sanda in March 1991, and the Kōen-Toshi Line between Yokoyama and Flower Town opened in October of the same year.

== Passenger statistics ==
In fiscal 2019, the station was used by an average of 3,708 passengers daily

== Surrounding area ==
- Japan National Route 276
- Sanda Gakuen Junior and Senior High School
- Hyogo Prefectural Hokusetsu Sanda High School

== See also ==
- List of railway stations in Japan
