= Arimaguchi Station =

Railway station in Kobe, Japan

KB15 Arimaguchi Station 有馬口駅
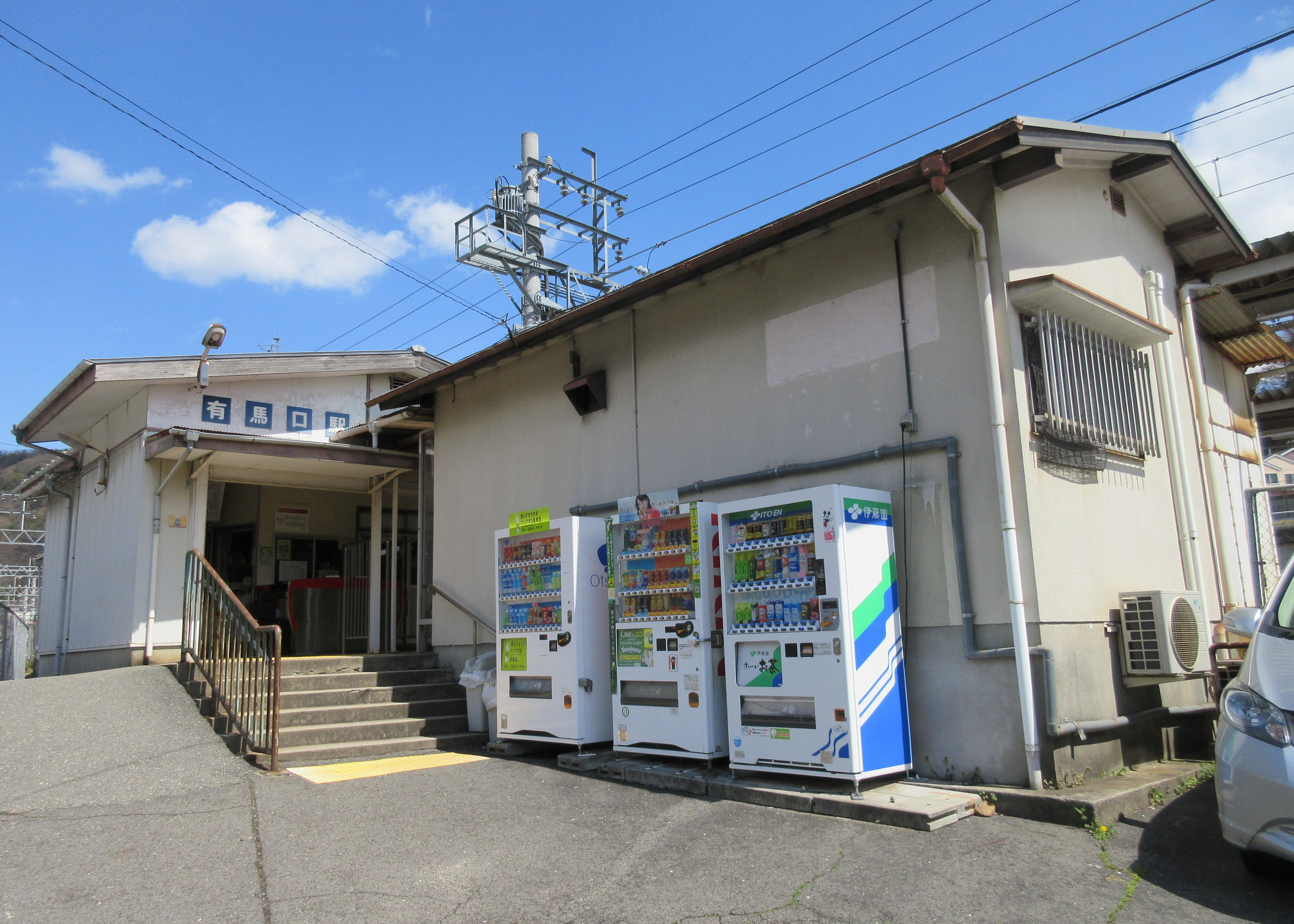
- Station building

General information
- Location: Karato Arinocho, Kita-ku, Kobe-shi Hyōgo-ken 651-1331; Japan
- Coordinates: 34°47′48.27″N 135°13′15.42″E
- Operator: Kobe Electric Railway (Shintetsu)
- Line: Shintetsu Sanda Line Shintetsu Arima Line
- Distance: 20.0 km (12.4 miles) from Minatogawa
- Platforms: 2 island platforms

Other information
- Status: Unstaffed
- Station code: KB15
- Website: Official website

History
- Opened: 28 November 1928
- Former names: Karatoe (to 1951); Arima Onsenguchi (to 1954)

Passengers
- FY2019: 889 (daily)

Services
Preceding station	Kobe Electric Railway	Following station
Karatodai KB14 towards Minatogawa	Arima Line Rapid	through to Sanda Line
Karatodai KB14 towards Minatogawa	Arima Line Semi Express Local	Arima Onsen KB16 Terminus
through to Arima Line	Sanda Line Rapid Semi Express Local	Gosha KB21 towards Sanda
Location
- Location within Hyōgo Prefecture Location within Japan

Arimaguchi Station (有馬口駅, Arimaguchi-eki) is a junction passenger railway station located in Kita-ku Kobe, Hyōgo Prefecture, Japan. It is operated by the private transportation company, Kobe Electric Railway (Shintetsu).

== Lines ==
Arimaguchi Station is a terminus of the Shintetsu Sanda Line, and is located 12.0 kilometers from the opposing terminus at Sanda. It is also a station on the Shintetsu Arima Line and is 20.0 kilometers from the terminus of that line at Minatogawa and 20.4 kilometers from Shinkaichi.

== Station layout ==
The station consists of two ground-level island platforms connected to the station building by a level crossing.

=== Platforms ===
1	■ Shintetsu Sanda Line	for Sanda
2	■ Shintetsu Arima Line	for Arima Onsen
3	■ Shintetsu Arima Line	for Shinkaichi
4	■ Shintetsu Arima Line	for Arima Onsen for Shinkaichi

== History ==
On 28 November 1928, the station was opened as Karatoe Station (唐櫃駅) with the opening of the Arima Line. It was renamed Arima Onsenguchi Station (有馬温泉口駅) on 20 March 1951, and renamed again to its present name on 1 September 1954.

== Passenger statistics ==
In fiscal 2019, the station was used by an average of 889 passengers daily

== Surrounding area ==
- Arima Highway

== See also ==
- List of railway stations in Japan
