= Sanda Station =

Railway station in Sanda, Hyōgo Prefecture, Japan

JR-G61 KB29 Sanda Station 三田駅
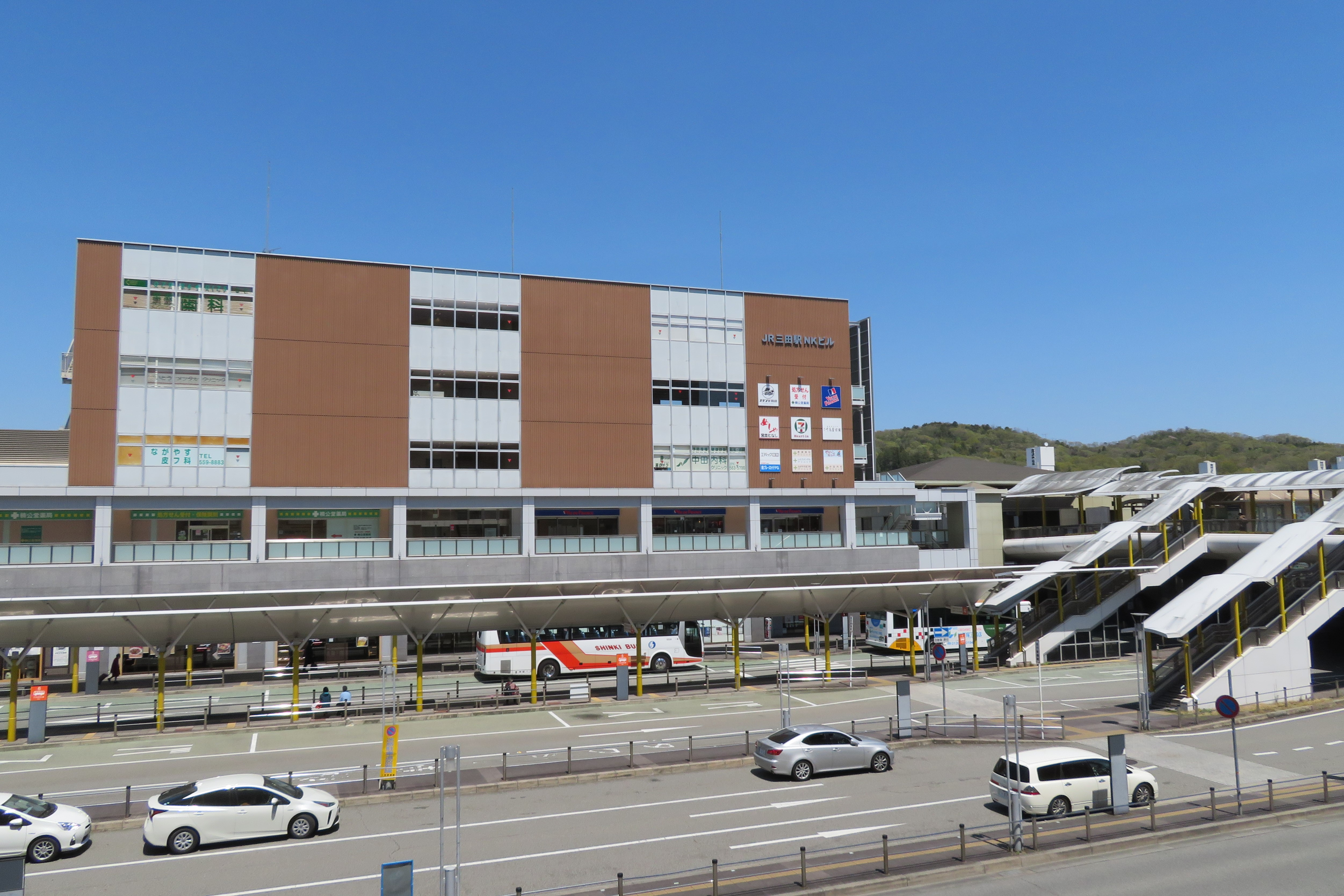
- Station building in 2020

General information
- Location: 1-32 Ekimaechō, Sanda-shi, Hyōgo-ken; Japan
- Coordinates: 34°53′20.27″N 135°13′47.24″E
- Operator: West Japan Railway Company; Kobe Electric Railway
- Lines: Fukuchiyama Line (JR Takarazuka Line); Shintetsu Sanda Line
- Platforms: 2 side platforms (JR West); 2 bay platforms (Shintetsu)
- Tracks: 2 (JR West); 2 (Shintetsu)

Other information
- Station code: JR-G61 (Fukuchiyama Line); KB-29 (Kobe Electric Railway)
- Website: JR; Shintetsu

History
- Opened: January 25, 1899 (JR); December 18, 1928 (Shintetsu)

Passengers
- 2016: 18,434 (JR); 8,386 (Shintetsu)

Services
Preceding station	JR West	Following station
Shin-Sanda G62 towards Sasayamaguchi	JR Takarazuka Line Tambaji Rapid; Rapid; Regional Rapid; Local	Dōjō G60 towards Ōsaka
Preceding station	Kobe Electric Railway	Following station
Sanda Honmachi KB28 towards Arimaguchi	Sanda Line Special Rapid Express Rapid Semi Express Local	Terminus
Location

Sanda Station (三田駅, Sanda-eki) is a junction passenger railway station located in the city of Sanda, Hyōgo Prefecture, Japan. It is jointly operated by the West Japan Railway Company (JR West) and the private transportation company, Kobe Electric Railway (Shintetsu).

== Lines ==
Sanda Station is served by the Fukuchiyama Line (JR Takarazuka Line), and is located 34.7 kilometers from the terminus of the line at Amagasaki and 41.4 kilometers from Osaka. It is also the terminus of the Shintetsu Sanda Line and is 12.0 kilometers from the opposing terminus of that line at Arimaguchi and 32.0 kilometers from Minatogawa.

== Station layout ==
=== JR West ===
- There are 2 side platforms with a track each on the ground. Ticket machines and ticket gates are in the building over the platforms and tracks.The station has a Midori no Madoguchi staffed ticket office.

1	■ JR Takarazuka Line	for Sasayamaguchi and Fukuchiyama
3	■ JR Takarazuka Line	for Takarazuka, Osaka and Kitashinchi

=== Shintetsu ===
- There are two bay platforms platforms with two tracks on the ground.

1, 2	■ Sanda Line	for Shinkaichi and Arima Onsen; Change trains at Tanigami for Shin-Kobe, and at Suzurandai for Ao
1, 2	■ Koen-Toshi Line	for Woody Town Chuo

== History ==
Sanda Station opened on 25 January 1899, as a station of Hankaku Railway, which was nationalized in 1907. With the privatization of the Japan National Railways (JNR) on 1 April 1987, the station came under the aegis of the West Japan Railway Company.

Station numbering was introduced to the JR West facilities in March 2018 with the platforms being assigned station number JR-G61.

== Passenger statistics ==
In fiscal 2016, the JR portion of the station was used by an average of 18,434 passengers daily and Shintetsu portion of the station was used by 8,386 passengers daily in the same period.

== Surrounding area ==
- Sanda City Hall
- Hyogo Prefectural Arima High School

== See also ==
- List of railway stations in Japan
