= Ōmiya Hachiman Shrine =

Ōmiya Hachiman Shrine may refer to:

- Ōmiya Hachiman Shrine (Hyōgo), a shinto shrine in Miki, Hyōgo, Japan
- Ōmiya Hachiman Shrine (Tokyo), a shinto shrine in Suginami, Tokyo, Japan
