= 2018 All Japan High School Women's Soccer Tournament =

The 2018 All Japan High School Women's Soccer Tournament was the 27th edition of the competition. It has held in Kobe through January 3 — 13, 2019, and it was won for the first time by Yokohama's Seisa Kokusai. In the final they defeated five times-champion Tokiwagi Gakuen, which had knocked out defending champion Fujieda Junshin on penalties in the first round.

== Qualified teams ==
Key to colours
Champion	Finalist	Semifinalists	Quarterfinalists

Region					
Kanto	(Tokyo) Shutoku	(Tokyo) Jumonji	(Kanagawa Prefecture) Seisa Kokusai Shonan	(Saitama Prefecture) Hanasaki Tokuharu	(Yamanashi Prefecture) Aviation
Kanto	(Gunma Prefecture) Maebashi Ikuei	(Ibaraki Prefecture) Kashima Gakuen			
Kansai	(Osaka Prefecture) Daisho Gakuen	(Hyōgo Prefecture) Hinomoto Gakuen	(Hyōgo Prefecture) Kobe Koryo Gakuen	(Kyoto Prefecture) Kyoto Seika Gakuen	(Hyōgo Prefecture) Himeji (host)
Kyushu	(Kagoshima Prefecture) Kamimura Gakuen	(Kumamoto Prefecture) Shugakukan	(Fukuoka Prefecture) Tokai Univ. Fukuoka	(Fukuoka Prefecture) Chikuyo Gakuen	
Chugoku	(Okayama Prefecture) Sakuyo	(Hiroshima Prefecture) Hiroshima Bunkyo UHS	(Shimane Prefecture) Matsue Shogyo		
Tohoku	(Miyagi Prefecture) Tokiwagi Gakuen	(Miyagi Prefecture) Seiwa Gakuen	(Iwate Prefecture) Senshu Univ. Kitakami		
Tokai	(Shizuoka Prefecture) Fujieda Junshin	(Aichi Prefecture) St. Capitanio	(Shizuoka Prefecture) Iwata Higashi		
Hokushin'etsu	(Niigata Prefecture) Teikyo Nagaoka	(Fukui Prefecture) Fukui IT	(Niigata Prefecture) Kaishi Gakuen JSC		
Hokkaido	Hokkaido Bunkyo Univ. Meisei	(Hokkaido) Otani Muroran			
Shikoku	(Tokushima Prefecture) Naruto Uzushio	(Kagawa Prefecture) SGU Kagawa Nishi			

== Results ==
January 3
Fujieda Junshin	0
Tokiwagi Gakuen	0
Senshu Kitakami	1
Kobe Koryo Gakuen	1
Hokkaido Bunkyo	0
Hinomoto Gakuen	1
Shutoku	7
Shugakukan	0
Jumonji	6
Matsue Shogyo	0
Fukui IT	0
Kagawa Nishi	1
Kaishi Gakuen	0
Hiroshima Bunkyo	0
Kamimura Gakuen	0
Teikyo Nagaoka	2
Daisho Gakuen	1
Seisa Kokusai	4
Otani Muroran	0
Chikuyo Gakuen	1
Hanasaki Tokuharu	2
Naruto Uzushio	1
Aviation	4
Kyoto Seika Gakuen	1
Iwata Higashi	1
Tokai Fukuoka	9
Kashima Gakuen	2
Himeji	5
Seiwa Gakuen	1
St. Capitanio	1
Maebashi Ikuei	1
Sakuyo	1

January 4
Tokiwagi Gakuen	11
Senshu Kitakami	0
Hinomoto Gakuen	2
Shutoku	0
Jumonji	5
Kagawa Nishi	1
Kaishi Gakuen	0
Teikyo Nagaoka	6
Seisa Kokusai	4
Chikuyo Gakuen	0
Hanasaki Tokuharu	3
Aviation	0
Tokai Fukuoka	3
Himeji	1
St. Capitanio	3
Sakuyo	3

January 6
Tokiwagi Gakuen	2
Hinomoto Gakuen	1
Jumonji	1
Teikyo Nagaoka	0
Seisa Kokusai	2
Hanasaki Tokuharu	1
Tokai Fukuoka	4
St. Capitanio	1

January 7
Tokiwagi Gakuen	2
Jumonji	0
Seisa Kokusai	4
Tokai Fukuoka	0

January 13
Tokiwagi Gakuen	0
Seisa Kokusai	1

=== Quarter-finals ===
6 January 2019
10:30

Tokiwagi Gakuen (Miyagi Prefecture)	2–1	(Hyōgo Prefecture) Hinomoto Gakuen
Megumi Nakamura 52'; Marin Tsuda 63'	Report	Mio Hisanaga 2'

Athletic Stadium, Miki
Attendance: 1,270
Referee: Maiko Hagio
6 January 2019
10:30

Jumonji (Tokyo)	1–0	(Niigata Prefecture) Teikyo Nagaoka
Yuika Ishitani 52'	Report

Second Athletic Stadium, Miki
Attendance: 320
Referee: Yoko Yasunami
6 January 2019
13:45

Seisa Kokusai (Kanagawa Prefecture)	2–1	(Saitama Prefecture) Hanasaki Tokuharu
Midori Kokubu 46'; Sakura Endo 51'	Report	Yuki Arai 66'

Second Athletic Stadium, Miki
Attendance: 229
Referee: Asuka Nakachi
6 January 2019
13:45

Tokai Fukuoka (Fukuoka Prefecture)	4–1	(Aichi Prefecture) St. Capitanio
Kiwa Fukunaga 38', 40', 70'; Aina Tomizawa 55'	Report	Misato Suzuki 20'

Athletic Stadium, Miki
Attendance: 730
Referee: Erina Kokushi

=== Semi-finals ===
7 January 2019
11:00

Tokiwagi Gakuen (Miyagi Prefecture)	2–0	(Tokyo) Jumonji
Ruseri Okino 34'; Shiori Kato 69'	Report

Universiade Memorial Stadium, Kobe
Attendance: 377
Referee: Michiko Fujita
7 January 2019
14:00

Seisa Kokusai (Kanagawa Prefecture)	4–0	(Fukuoka Prefecture) Tokai Fukuoka
Sakura Endo 3'; Momo Kato 30', 60'; Mami Anbo 35'	Report

Universiade Memorial Stadium, Kobe
Attendance: 306
Referee: Mio Ogata

=== Final ===
13 January 2019
14:15

Tokiwagi Gakuen (Miyagi Prefecture)	0–1	(Kanagawa Prefecture) Seisa Kokusai
	Report	Tomoyo Kuroyanagi 23'

Universiade Memorial Stadium, Kobe
Attendance: 5,428
Referee: Haruna Kanematsu
