= 2022 All Japan High School Women's Soccer Tournament =

Tournament details
- Country: Japan
- Dates: 30 December 2022 – 8 January 2023
- Teams: 32

Final positions
- Champions: Fujieda Junshin (6th title)
- Runners-up: Jumonji

Tournament statistics
- Matches played: 31
- Goals scored: 82 (2.65 per match)
- All statistics correct as of 8 January 2022.

The 2022 All Japan High School Women's Soccer Tournament (第31回全日本高等学校女子サッカー選手権大会; All Japan 31st High School Women's Soccer Tournament) marked the 31st edition of the referred annually contested women's cup for High Schools over Japan. The tournament was contested by 32 high schools in a knockout-stage format. The final was played one day prior to the men's final on 8 January 2023, at the Noevir Stadium Kobe. The Kamimura Gakuen High School were the defending champions, winning the last championship by 3–0 against the Hinomoto Gakuen High School.

Just like the men's tournament, from the first round (round of 32) to the quarter-finals, the matches had a duration of 80 minutes, split into two halves of 40 minutes each. The semi-finals and the final had the matches lasting 90 minutes. Should a match be tied, the match would directly go into penalty shoot-outs, except for the final, where overtime would be played if the match ended tied for 90 minutes.

== Calendar ==
The tournament will take place in a 11-day span, with the tournament split in a total of 5 stages.

Round	Date	Matches	Clubs
Round of 32	30 December 2022	16	32 → 16
Round of 16	31 December 2022	8	16 → 8
Quarter-finals	3 January 2023	4	8 → 4
Semi-finals	5 January 2023	2	4 → 2
Final	8 January 2023	1	2 → 1

== Venues ==
All the matches were played in the Hyogo Prefecture. Some of the stadiums utilized two grounds, or fields, at the same place, being able to simultaneously hold matches. The selected venues were as follows:

- Miki
  - Miki Athletic Stadium (No. 1 and No.2) – Hosted matches from the round of 16 to the quarter-finals
  - Mikibo Football Ground (No.1 and No.2) – Hosted matches from the round of 16 to the quarter-finals
- Sumoto
  - Awaji Sports Park (Main and sub-ground) – Hosted Round of 32 matches
- Kobe
  - Ibuki Forest Training Ground (A and B ground) – Hosted Round of 32 matches
  - Noevir Stadium Kobe – Hosted the three final matches from the semi-final round

== Participating clubs ==
The Hyogo prefectural qualification was the only one to directly qualify a prefectural qualification winner for the national competition without needing to play the regional qualification, as the Hyogo Prefecture will host the tournament, being granted to have a team to represent the prefecture as its tournament winner, and as its host team. In parentheses: Each school's performance at the regional qualifying series.

Region	High School	Located on
Host team (Kansai)	Himeji Jogakuin High School (WC)	Hyogo
Hokkaido	Hokkaido Otani Muroran High School (1st)	Muroran
Hokkaido	Asahikawa Jitsugyo High School (2nd)	Asahikawa
Tohoku	Tokiwagi Gakuen High School (1st)	Miyagi
Tohoku	Shoshi High School (2nd)	Fukushima
Tohoku	Seiwa Gakuen High School (3rd)	Miyagi
Kanto	Jumonji High School (1st)	Tokyo
Kanto	Aviation High School (2nd)	Yamanashi
Kanto	Seisa Kokusai High School (3rd)	Kanagawa
Kanto	Shutoku High School (4th)	Tokyo
Kanto	Maebashi Ikuei High School (5th)	Gunma
Kanto	Kasumigaura High School (6th)	Ibaraki
Kanto	Gyosei Kokusai High School (7th)	Chiba
Hokushin'etsu	Daishi Gakuen High School (1st)	Niigata
Hokushin'etsu	Saku Chosei High School (2nd)	Nagano
Hokushin'etsu	Teikyo Nagaoka High School (3rd)	Niigata
Tokai	Fujieda Junshin High School (1st)	Shizuoka
Tokai	Tokoha Univ. Tachibana High School (2nd)	Shizuoka
Tokai	St. Capitanio High School (3rd)	Aichi
Kansai	Osaka Gakugei High School (1st)	Osaka
Kansai	Hinomoto Gakuen High School (2nd)	Hyogo
Kansai	Otemon Gakuin High School (3rd)	Osaka
Kansai	Kyoto Seika Gakuen High School (4th)	Kyoto
Chugoku	Sakuyo High School (1st)	Okayama
Chugoku	AICJ High School (2nd)	Hiroshima
Chugoku	Takagawa Gakuen High School (3rd)	Yamaguchi
Shikoku	Kagawa Nishi High School (1st)	Kagawa
Shikoku	Naruto Uzushio High School (2nd)	Tokushima
Kyushu	Kamimura Gakuen High School (1st)	Kagoshima
Kyushu	Yanagigaura High School (2nd)	Oita
Kyushu	Tokai Univ. Fukuoka High School (3rd)	Fukuoka
Kyushu	Chinzei Gakuen High School (4th)	Nagasaki

== Schedule ==
=== First round ===
30 December 2022 Match 1	Kamimura Gakuen (Kagoshima Prefecture)	0–3	(Hiroshima Prefecture) AICJ	Miki
13:45		Report (JFA)		Stadium: Miki Athletic Stadium No.1

30 December 2022 Match 2	Himeji Kokusai (Hyōgo Prefecture)	0–0 (4–3 p)	(Chiba Prefecture) Gyosei Kokusai	Sumoto
13:45		Report (JFA)		Stadium: Awaji Sports Park Main Ground

30 December 2022 Match 3	Saku Chosei (Nagano Prefecture)	0–0 (6–7 p)	(Nagasaki Prefecture) Chinzei Gakuen	Kobe
10:30		Report (JFA)		Stadium: Ibuki Forest Training Ground A

30 December 2022 Match 4	Asahikawa Jitsugyo (Hokkaido)	0–5	(Okayama Prefecture) Sakuyo	Miki
10:30		Report (JFA)		Stadium: Mikibo Football Ground No.2

30 December 2022 Match 5	Hokkaido Otani (Hokkaido)	0–2	(Kyoto Prefecture) Kyoto Seika	Sumoto
10:30		Report (JFA)		Stadium: Awaji Sports Park Main Ground

30 December 2022 Match 6	Takagawa Gakuen (Yamaguchi Prefecture)	1–1 (3–2 p)	(Gunma Prefecture) Maebashi Ikuei	Sumoto
10:30		Report (JFA)		Stadium: Awaji Sports Park Sub Ground

30 December 2022 Match 7	Yanagigaura (Ōita Prefecture)	1–4	(Shizuoka Prefecture) Tokoha Tachibana	Kobe
13:45		Report (JFA)		Stadium: Ibuki Forest Training Ground A

30 December 2022 Match 8	Teikyo Nagaoka (Niigata Prefecture)	0–4	(Shizuoka Prefecture) Fujieda Junshin	Miki
13:45		Report (JFA)		Stadium: Mikibo Football Ground No.1

30 December 2022 Match 9	Tokiwagi Gakuen (Miyagi Prefecture)	4–2	(Ibaraki Prefecture) Kasumigaura	Miki
10:30		Report (JFA)		Stadium: Mikibo Football Ground No.1

30 December 2022 Match 10	Aviation (Yamanashi Prefecture)	2–1	(Aichi Prefecture) St. Capitanio	Kobe
10:30		Report (JFA)		Stadium: Ibuki Forest Training Ground B

30 December 2022 Match 11	Jumonji (Tokyo)	2–0	(Miyagi Prefecture) Seiwa Gakuen	Miki
13:45		Report (JFA)		Stadium: Miki Athletic Stadium No.2

30 December 2022 Match 12	Shoshi (Fukushima Prefecture)	3–2	(Niigata Prefecture) Daishi Gakuen	Kobe
13:45		Report (JFA)		Stadium: Ibuki Forest Training Ground B

30 December 2022 Match 13	Kagawa Nishi (Kagawa Prefecture)	0–0 (4–2 p)	(Fukuoka Prefecture) Tokai Fukuoka	Sumoto
13:45		Report (JFA)		Stadium: Awaji Sports Park Sub Ground

30 December 2022 Match 14	Otemon Gakuin (Osaka Prefecture)	1–0	(Kanagawa Prefecture) Seisa Kokusai	Miki
13:45		Report (JFA)		Stadium: Mikibo Football Ground No.2

30 December 2022 Match 15	Hinomoto Gakuen (Hyōgo Prefecture)	4–0	(Tokushima Prefecture) Naruto Uzushio	Miki
10:30		Report (JFA)		Stadium: Miki Athletic Stadium No.1

30 December 2022 Match 16	Shutoku (Tokyo)	0–2	(Osaka Prefecture) Osaka Gakugei	Miki
10:30		Report (JFA)		Stadium: Miki Athletic Stadium No.2

=== Round of 16 ===
31 December 2022 Match 17	AICJ (Hiroshima Prefecture)	1–0	(Hyōgo Prefecture) Himeji Kokusai	Miki
13:45		Report (JFA)		Stadium: Miki Athletic Stadium No.1

31 December 2022 Match 18	Chinzei Gakuen (Nagasaki Prefecture)	2–2 (3–4 p)	(Okayama Prefecture) Sakuyo	Miki
10:30		Report (JFA)		Stadium: Mikibo Football Ground No.1

31 December 2022 Match 19	Kyoto Seika (Kyoto Prefecture)	0–2	(Yamaguchi Prefecture) Takagawa Gakuen	Miki
10:30		Report (JFA)		Stadium: Mikibo Football Ground No.2

31 December 2022 Match 20	Tokoha Tachibana (Shizuoka Prefecture)	0–1	(Shizuoka Prefecture) Fujieda Junshin	Miki
13:45		Report (JFA)		Stadium: Mikibo Football Ground No.1

31 December 2022 Match 21	Tokiwagi Gakuen (Miyagi Prefecture)	1–0	(Yamanashi Prefecture) Aviation	Miki
10:30		Report (JFA)		Stadium: Miki Athletic Stadium No.2

31 December 2022 Match 22	Jumonji (Tokyo)	4–0	(Fukushima Prefecture) Shoshi	Miki
13:45		Report (JFA)		Stadium: Miki Athletic Stadium No.2

31 December 2022 Match 23	Kagawa Nishi (Kagawa Prefecture)	0–2	(Osaka Prefecture) Otemon Gakuin	Miki
13:45		Report (JFA)		Stadium: Mikibo Football Ground No.2

31 December 2022 Match 24	Hinomoto Gakuen (Hyōgo Prefecture)	1–0	(Osaka Prefecture) Osaka Gakugei	Miki
10:30		Report (JFA)		Stadium: Miki Athletic Stadium No.1

=== Quarter-finals ===
3 January 2022 Match 25	AICJ (Hiroshima Prefecture)	2–2 (2–4 p)	(Okayama Prefecture) Sakuyo	Miki
10:30		Report (JFA)		Stadium: Miki Athletic Stadium No.1

3 January 2022 Match 26	Takagawa Gakuen (Yamaguchi Prefecture)	1–6	(Shizuoka Prefecture) Fujieda Junshin	Miki
13:45		Report (JFA)		Stadium: Miki Athletic Stadium No.2

3 January 2022 Match 27	Tokiwagi Gakuen (Miyagi Prefecture)	1–2	(Tokyo) Jumonji	Miki
10:30		Report (JFA)		Stadium: Miki Athletic Stadium No.2

3 January 2022 Match 28	Otemon Gakuin (Osaka Prefecture)	1–3	(Hyōgo Prefecture) Hinomoto Gakuen	Miki
13:45		Report (JFA)		Stadium: Miki Athletic Stadium No.1

=== Semi-finals ===
5 January 2022 Match 29	Sakuyo (Okayama Prefecture)	0–1	(Shizuoka Prefecture) Fujieda Junshin	Kobe
11:00		Report (JFA)	Yui Shimoyoshi 56'	Stadium: Noevir Stadium Kobe

5 January 2022 Match 30	Jumonji (Tokyo)	1–1 (3–1 p)	(Hyōgo Prefecture) Hinomoto Gakuen	Kobe
14:00	Mahiro Miyake 85'	Report (JFA)	Haruna Tanaka 86'	Stadium: Noevir Stadium Kobe

=== Final ===
8 January 2022 Match 31	Fujieda Junshin (Shizuoka Prefecture)	1–0	(Tokyo) Jumonji	Kobe
14:10	Runa Masano 68'	Report (JFA)		Stadium: Noevir Stadium Kobe
