= All Japan High School Women's Soccer Tournament =

- Founded: 1992
- Region: Japan
- Teams: 32
- Current champions: Fujieda Junshin (2023) (7th title)
- Most championships: Fujieda Junshin (7 titles)
- Broadcaster(s): NTV, and 43 commercial broadcasters
- Website: JFA

The All Japan High School Women's Soccer Tournament of Japan is an annual nationwide high school association women's football tournament organized by the Japan Football Association.

First played in 1992, the final tournament was originally held in Kobe. In 2002 it was moved to Iwata, but in 2014 the competition was moved to Kobe. It used to take place in summer, but since the 2012 edition it has been played in January during the winter school vacation period, like the male High School Tournament. The tournament is broadcast by TBS.

== Slots by regions ==
- As of the 2022 edition.

Teams	Regions			
7	Kantō			
4	Kansai	Kyūshū		
3	Chūgoku	Hokushin'etsu	Tōhoku	Tōkai
2	Hokkaido	Shikoku		
1	Host prefecture			

== Champions ==
Year	High School	Location	Region
1992	Seiwa Gakuen	Sendai	Tohoku
1993	Honjo Daiichi	Saitama	Kanto
1994	Saitama	Saitama	Kanto
1995	Saitama Sakae	Saitama	Kanto
1996	Saitama	Saitama	Kanto
1997	Keimei Gakuin	Kobe	Kansai
1998	Seiwa Gakuen	Sendai	Tohoku
1999	Shonan Joshi	Yokohama	Kanto
2000	Keimei Gakuin	Kobe	Kansai
2001	Seiwa Gakuen	Sendai	Tohoku
2002	Tokiwagi Gakuen	Sendai	Tohoku
2003	Hooh	Kagoshima	Kyushu
2004	Kamimura Gakuen	Kagoshima	Kyushu
2005	Kamimura Gakuen	Kagoshima	Kyushu
2006	Fujieda Junshin	Fujieda	Chubu
2007	Hooh	Kagoshima	Kyushu
2008	Tokiwagi Gakuen	Sendai	Tohoku
2009	Tokiwagi Gakuen	Sendai	Tohoku
2010	Hinomoto Gakuen	Akashi	Kansai
2011	Tokiwagi Gakuen	Sendai	Tohoku
2012	Tokiwagi Gakuen	Sendai	Tohoku
2013	Hinomoto Gakuen	Akashi	Kansai
2014	Hinomoto Gakuen	Akashi	Kansai
2015	Fujieda Junshin	Fujieda	Chubu
2016	Jumonji	Tokyo	Kanto
2017	Fujieda Junshin	Fujieda	Chubu
2018	Seisa Kokusai	Yokohama	Kanto
2019	Fujieda Junshin	Fujieda	Chubu
2020	Fujieda Junshin	Fujieda	Chubu
2021	Kamimura Gakuen	Kagoshima	Kyushu
2022	Fujieda Junshin	Fujieda	Chubu
2023	Fujieda Junshin	Fujieda	Chubu
