= 2023 All Japan High School Women's Soccer Tournament =

Tournament details
- Country: Japan
- Dates: 30 December 2023 – 7 January 2024
- Teams: 32

Final positions
- Champions: Fujieda Junshin (7th title)
- Runners-up: Jumonji

The 2023 All Japan High School Women's Soccer Tournament (Note: Japanese: 第32回全日本高等学校女子サッカー選手権大会, Hepburn: Dai 32-kai Zen Nihon Kōtō Gakkō Joshi Sakkā Senshuken Taikai) marked the 32nd edition of the referred annually contested women's cup for High Schools over Japan. The tournament was, as usual, contested by 32 high schools in a knockout-stage format. Fujieda Junshin High School were the defending champions, winning the last championship by 1–0 against Jumonji High School. They eventually won the tournament against Jumonji in this 2023 edition as well, but now by 3–0.

Just like the men's tournament, from the first round (round of 32) to the quarter-finals, the matches had a duration of 80 minutes, split into two halves of 40 minutes each. The semi-finals and the final had the matches lasting 90 minutes. Should a match be tied, the match would directly go into penalty shoot-outs, except for the final, where overtime would be played if the match ended tied for 90 minutes.

== Calendar ==
Round	Date	Matches	Clubs
Round of 32	30 December 2023	16	32 → 16
Round of 16	31 December 2023	8	16 → 8
Quarter-finals	3 January 2024	4	8 → 4
Semi-finals	5 January 2024	2	4 → 2
Final	7 January 2024	1	2 → 1

== Venues ==
All the matches were played in the Hyogo Prefecture. Some of the stadiums utilized two grounds, or fields, at the same place, being able to simultaneously hold matches. The selected venues were as follows:

- Miki
  - Miki Athletic Stadium (No. 1 and No.2) – Hosted matches from the round of 16 to the quarter-finals
  - Mikibo Football Ground (No.1 and No.2) – Hosted Round of 32 and Round of 16 matches
- Sumoto
  - Goshikidai Sports Park (Main and sub-ground) – Hosted Round of 32 matches
- Kobe
  - Ibuki Forest Training Ground (A and B ground) – Hosted Round of 32 matches
  - Noevir Stadium Kobe – Hosted both semi-finals and the final

== Participating clubs ==
The Hyogo prefectural qualification was the only one to directly qualify a prefectural qualification winner for the national competition without needing to play the regional qualification, as the Hyogo Prefecture will host the tournament, being granted to have a team to represent the prefecture as its tournament winner, and as its host team. In parentheses: Each school's performance at the regional qualifying series.

Region	High School	Located on
Host team (Kansai)	Hinomoto Gakuen High School (WC)	Hyogo
Hokkaido	Hokkaido Bunkyo University High School (1st)	Eniwa
Hokkaido	Asahikawa Jitsugyo High School (2nd)	Asahikawa
Tohoku	Tokiwagi Gakuen High School (1st)	Miyagi
Tohoku	Seiwa Gakuen High School (2nd)	Miyagi
Tohoku	Senshu University Kitakami High School (3rd)	Iwate
Kanto	Shutoku High School (1st)	Tokyo
Kanto	Jumonji High School (2nd)	Tokyo
Kanto	Gyosei Kokusai High School (3rd)	Chiba
Kanto	Seisa Kokusai High School (4th)	Kanagawa
Kanto	Ryutsu Keizai University Kashiwa High School (5th)	Chiba
Kanto	Kasumigaura High School (6th)	Ibaraki
Kanto	Utsunomiya Bunsei Girls' High School (7th)	Tochigi
Hokushin'etsu	Saku Chosei High School (1st)	Nagano
Hokushin'etsu	Fukui University of Technology Fukui High School (2nd)	Fukui
Hokushin'etsu	Kaishi Gakuen JSC (3rd)	Niigata
Tokai	Fujieda Junshin High School (1st)	Shizuoka
Tokai	Tokoha Univ. Tachibana High School (2nd)	Shizuoka
Tokai	St. Capitanio High School (3rd)	Aichi
Kansai	Osaka Gakugei High School (1st)	Osaka
Kansai	Kyoto Seika Gakuen High School (2nd)	Kyoto
Kansai	Kobe Koryo Gakuen High School (3rd)	Hyogo
Kansai	Himeki Jogakuin High School (4th)	Hyogo
Chugoku	Takagawa Gakuen High School (1st)	Yamaguchi
Chugoku	AICJ High School (2nd)	Hiroshima
Chugoku	Sakuyo High School (3rd)	Okayama
Shikoku	Naruto Uzushio High School (1st)	Tokushima
Shikoku	Kochi High School (2nd)	Kochi
Kyushu	Tokai Univ. Fukuoka High School (1st)	Fukuoka
Kyushu	Kamimura Gakuen High School (2nd)	Kagoshima
Kyushu	Chikuyo Gakuen High School (3rd)	Fukuoka
Kyushu	Yanagigaura High School (4th)	Oita

== Schedule ==
=== Round of 32 ===
30 December 2023	Fujieda Junshin	7–1	Kobe Koryo Gakuen

30 December 2023	Chikuyo Gakuen	1–1 (5–4 p)	Himeji Jogakuin

30 December 2023	Kaishi Gakuen JSC	1–2	Kochi

30 December 2023	Kamimura Gakuen	4–0	Hokkaido Bunkyo

30 December 2023	Tokai Fukuoka	0–1	AICJ

30 December 2023	Hinomoto Gakuen	3–2	Utsunomiya Bunsei

30 December 2023	St. Capitanio	2–1	Seisa Kokusai Shonan

30 December 2023	Sakuyo	0–4	Osaka Gakugei

30 December 2023	Takagawa Gakuen	1–2	Fukui UT Fukui

30 December 2023	Jumonji	3–1	Kyoto Seika Gakuen

30 December 2023	Saku Chosei	0–1	Gyosei Kokusai

30 December 2023	Asahikawa Jitsugyo	0–9	Naruto Uzushio

30 December 2023	Tokiwagi Gakuen	0–4	Tokoha Tachibana

30 December 2023	Kasumigaura	1–2	Yanagigaura

30 December 2023	RKU Kashiwa	0–2	Seiwa Gakuen

30 December 2023	Senshu Kitakami	0–4	Shutoku

=== Round of 16 ===
31 December 2023	Fujieda Junshin	5–0	Chikuyo Gakuen

31 December 2023	Kochi	0–7	Kamimura Gakuen

31 December 2023	AICJ	3–1	Hinomoto Gakuen

31 December 2023	St. Capitanio	0–3	Osaka Gakugei

31 December 2023	Fukui UT Fukui	0–6	Jumonji

31 December 2023	Gyosei Kokusai	2–1	Naruto Uzushio

31 December 2023	Tokoha Tachibana	0–1	Yanagigaura

31 December 2023	Seiwa Gakuen	2–3	Shutoku

=== Quarter-finals ===
3 January 2024	Fujieda Junshin	1–0	Kamimura Gakuen

3 January 2024	AICJ	0–2	Osaka Gakugei

3 January 2024	Jumonji	3–1	Gyosei Kokusai

3 January 2024	Yanagigaura	1–1 (5–3 p)	Shutoku

=== Semi-finals ===
5 January 2024	Fujieda Junshin	1–0	Osaka Gakugei	Kobe
	Rion Fujiwara 90+1'	Report		Stadium: Noevir Stadium Kobe; Attendance: 832; Referee: Satomi Inaba

5 January 2024	Jumonji	2–0	Yanagigaura	Kobe
	Marika Fukushima 25'; Ai Anzai 29'	Report		Stadium: Noevir Stadium Kobe; Attendance: 544; Referee: Marika Iwamoto

=== Final ===
7 January 2024 Match 31	Fujieda Junshin	3–0	Jumonji	Kobe
12:00	Mao Kubota 3'; Ai Tsujisawa 45'; Yui Kasai 75'	Report		Stadium: Noevir Stadium Kobe; Attendance: 2,350; Referee: Narumi Baba
