= Ōmura Station =

Ōmura Station (大村駅) is the name of two train stations in Japan:

- Ōmura Station (Hyōgo)
- Ōmura Station (Nagasaki)
