= Midorigaoka Station =

Midorigaoka Station may refer to multiple railway stations in Japan:

- Midorigaoka Station (Tokyo) on the Tokyu Oimachi Line
- Midorigaoka Station (Hyogo) on the Shintetsu Ao Line
- Midorigaoka Station (Hokkaido) on the Furano Line
