= 2010 Empress's Cup final =

2010 Empress's Cup Final
INAC Kobe Leonessa	Urawa Reds
1	1
- INAC Kobe won 3–2 on penalties
- Date: January 1, 2011
- Venue: National Stadium, Tokyo

2010 Empress's Cup Final was the 32nd final of the Empress's Cup competition. The final was played at National Stadium in Tokyo on January 1, 2011. INAC Kobe Leonessa won the championship.

== Overview ==
INAC Kobe Leonessa won their 1st title, by defeating Urawa Reds on a penalty shoot-out.

== Match details ==
January 1, 2011

INAC Kobe Leonessa	1-1 (pen 3-2)	Urawa Reds
Nahomi Kawasumi 7'	Report	? 68'

National Stadium

== See also ==
- 2010 Empress's Cup
