= Miki Station =

Railway station in Miki, Hyōgo Prefecture, Japan

Miki Station 三木駅
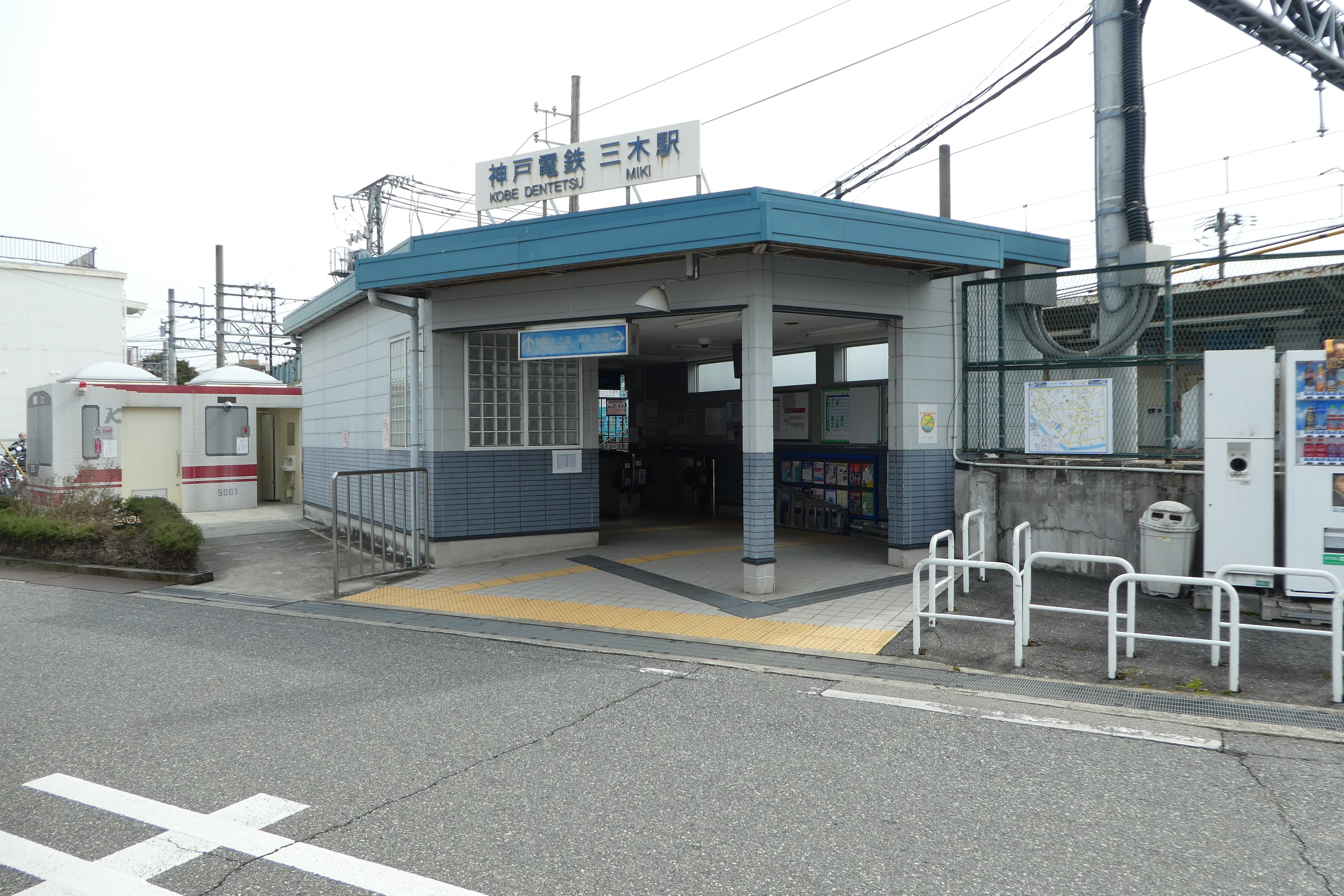
- Miki Station, March 2018

General information
- Location: 1-35, Suehiro 1-chome, Miki-shi, Hyōgo-ken 673-0403; Japan
- Coordinates: 34°47′59″N 134°58′53″E
- Operator: Kobe Electric Railway
- Line: ■ Ao Line
- Distance: 19.3 km from Suzurandai
- Platforms: 2 side platforms
- Connections

Other information
- Station code: KB53
- Website: Official website

History
- Opened: 28 January 1938
- Former names: Miki-Fukuyubashi → Dentetsu Miki (until 1988)

Passengers
- FY2019: 852
Location
- Location within Hyōgo Prefecture Location within Japan

Miki Station (三木駅, Miki-eki) is a passenger railway station located in the city of Miki, Hyōgo Prefecture, Japan, operated by the private Kobe Electric Railway (Shintetsu). There was a station with the same name on the Miki Railway Miki Line which ended operation on March 31, 2008 and was abandoned the next day.

== Lines ==
Miki Station is served by the Ao Line and is 19.3 kilometers from the terminus of the line at Suzurandai and is 26.8 kilometers from Minatogawa and 27.2 kilometers from Shinkaichi.

== Station layout ==
The station consists of two opposed ground-level side platforms connected to the station building by a level crossing. The station is unattended.

=== Platforms ===
1	■ Ao Line	for Ono and Ao
2	■ Ao Line	for Shijimi, Minatogawa and Shinkaichi

== Adjacent stations ==
«	Service	»
Shintetsu Ao Line
Miki Uenomaru	Express	Omura
Miki Uenomaru	Semi-Express	Omura
Miki Uenomaru	Local	Omura

== History ==
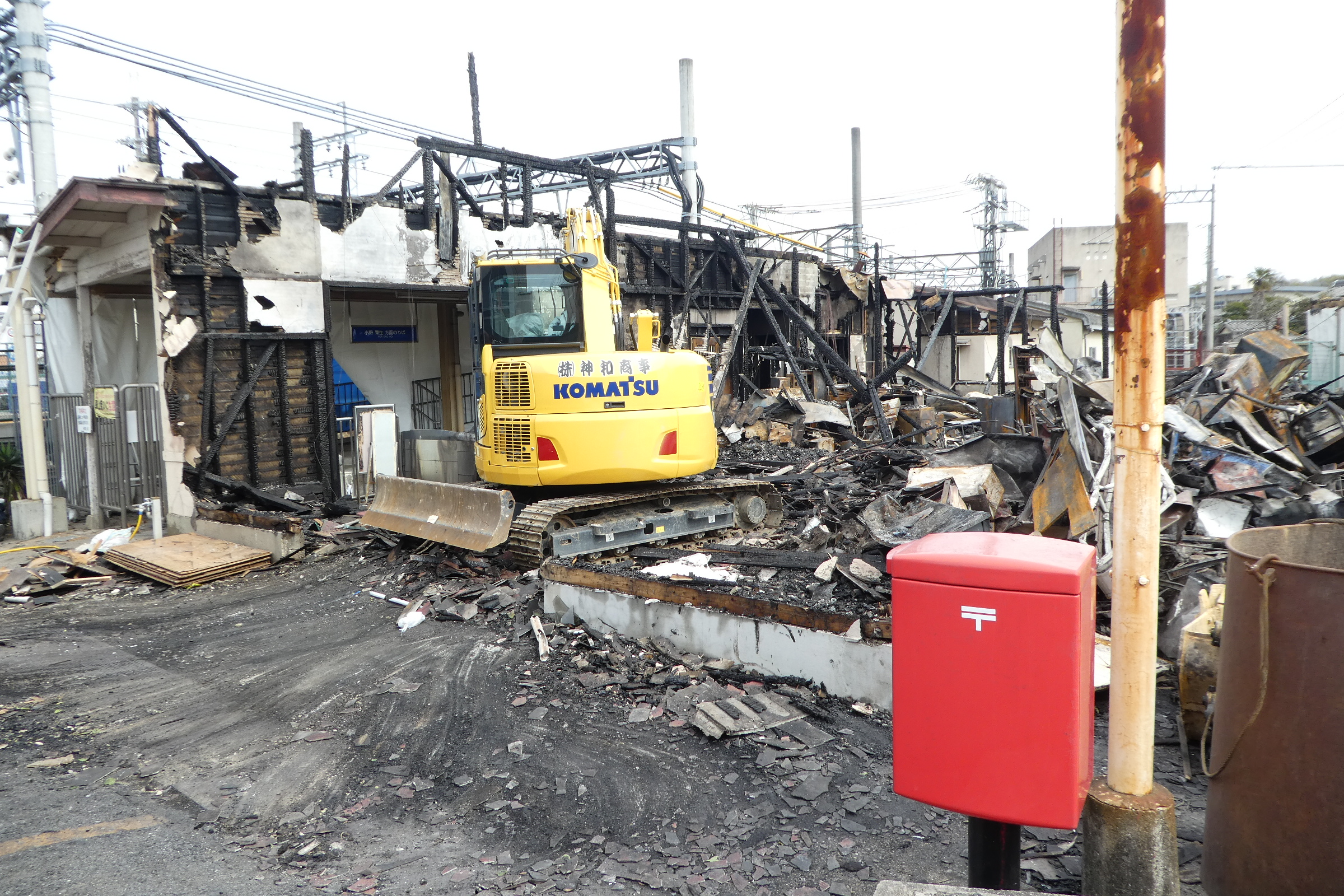
Damage caused by the fire at the station.

Miki Station opened on January 28, 1938, as Miki-Fukuyubashi Station (三木福有橋駅). It was renamed Dentetsu Miki Station (電鉄三木駅) on January 1, 1954, and renamed again to its present name on April 1, 1988.

On March 4, 2018, at around 6 p.m. (local time), fire from a neighboring two-story house spread to the station. Both structures were destroyed in the blaze. The southward part of the station closed temporarily on the next day before reopened on March 9.

== Passenger statistics ==
In fiscal 2019, the station was used by an average of 852 passengers daily.

== Surrounding area ==
- Ōmiya Hachiman Shrine
- Hyogo Prefectural Miki High School
- Miki Municipal Miki Junior High School
- Miki City Miki Elementary School

== See also ==
- List of railway stations in Japan
