= Kashiyama Station =

Railway station in Ono, Hyōgo Prefecture, Japan

Kashiyama Station 樫山駅
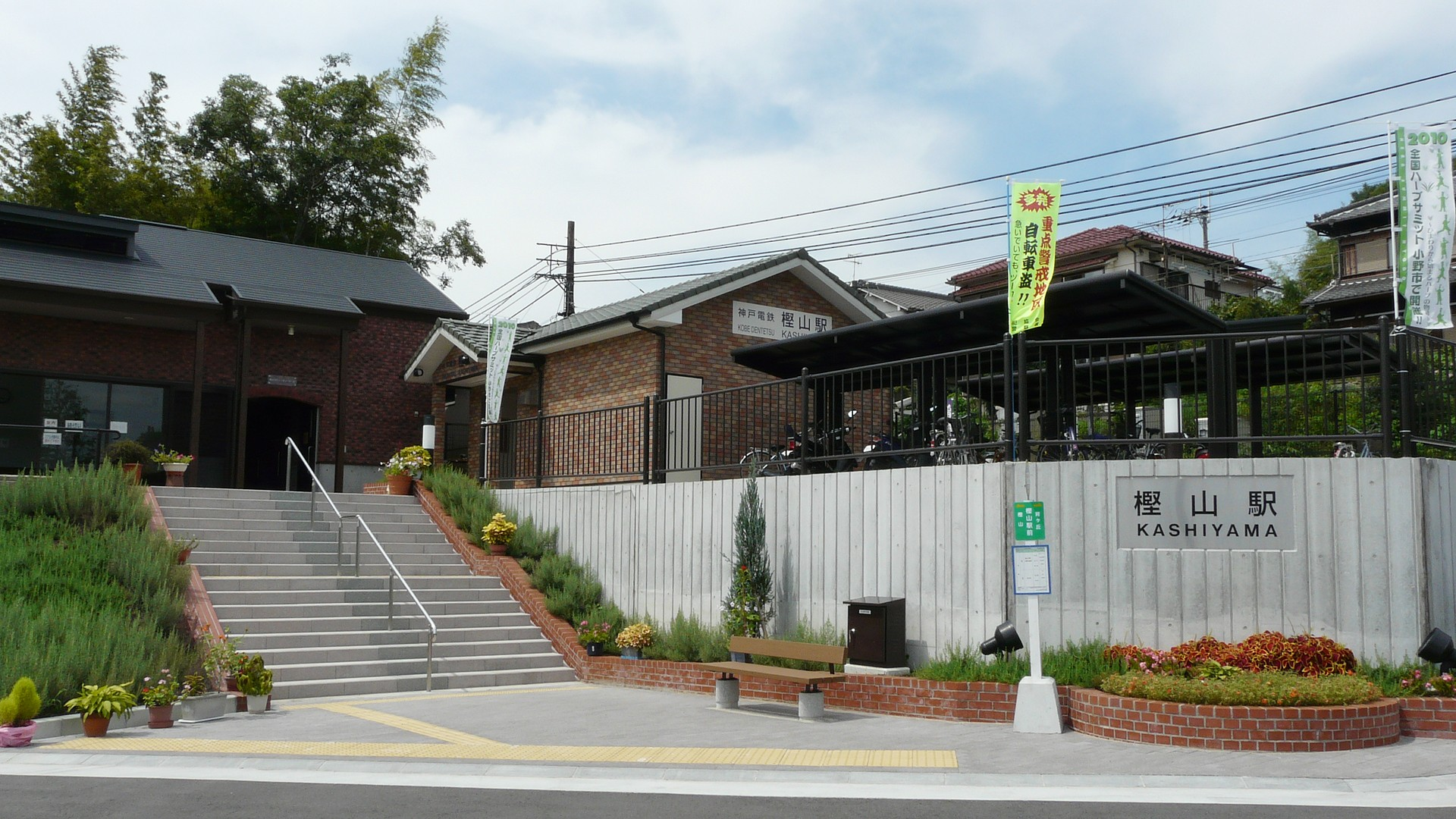
- Kashiyama Station, July 2009

General information
- Location: 1476-3, Kashiyama-cho Aza Koshikake, Ono-shi, Hyōgo-ken 675-1325; Japan
- Coordinates: 34°49′14″N 134°56′59″E
- Operator: Kobe Electric Railway
- Line: ■ Ao Line
- Distance: 23.2 km from Suzurandai
- Platforms: 2 side platforms
- Connections: Bus stop

Other information
- Station code: KB55
- Website: Official website

History
- Opened: 28 December 1951

Passengers
- FY2019: 290
Location
- Location within Hyōgo Prefecture Location within Japan

Kashiyama Station (樫山駅, Kashiyama-eki) is a passenger railway station located in the city of Ono, Hyōgo Prefecture, Japan, operated by the private Kobe Electric Railway (Shintetsu).

== Lines ==
Kashiyama Station is served by the Ao Line and is 23.2 kilometers from the terminus of the line at Suzurandai and is 30.7 kilometers from Minatogawa and 31.1 kilometers from Shinkaichi.

== Station layout ==
The station consists of tow unnumbered ground-level side platforms connected by a level crossing. The station is unattended.

=== Platforms ===
station side	■ Ao Line	for Ono and Ao
opposite side	■ Ao Line	for Shijimi, Minatogawa and Shinkaichi

== Adjacent stations ==
«	Service	»
Shintetsu Ao Line
Omura	Express	Ichiba
Omura	Semi-Express	Ichiba
Omura	Local	Ichiba

== History ==
Kashiyama Station opened on December 28, 1951.

== Passenger statistics ==
In fiscal 2019, the station was used by an average of 290 passengers daily.

== Surrounding area ==
- Ono Takumidai Industrial Park.

== See also ==
- List of railway stations in Japan
