= Mino District =

Former district in Hyōgo prefecture, Japan

Minō (美嚢郡, Minō-gun) was a district located in Hyōgo Prefecture, Japan.

As of 2003, the district had an estimated population of 9,486 and a density of 168.04 persons per km^{2}. The total area was 56.45 km^{2}.

== Former towns and villages ==
- Yokawa

== Merger ==
- On October 24, 2005 - the town of Yokawa was merged into the expanded city of Miki. Minō District was dissolved as a result of this merger.
