= Gayain =

Buddhist temple in Hyōgo Prefecture, Japan

Gaya-in
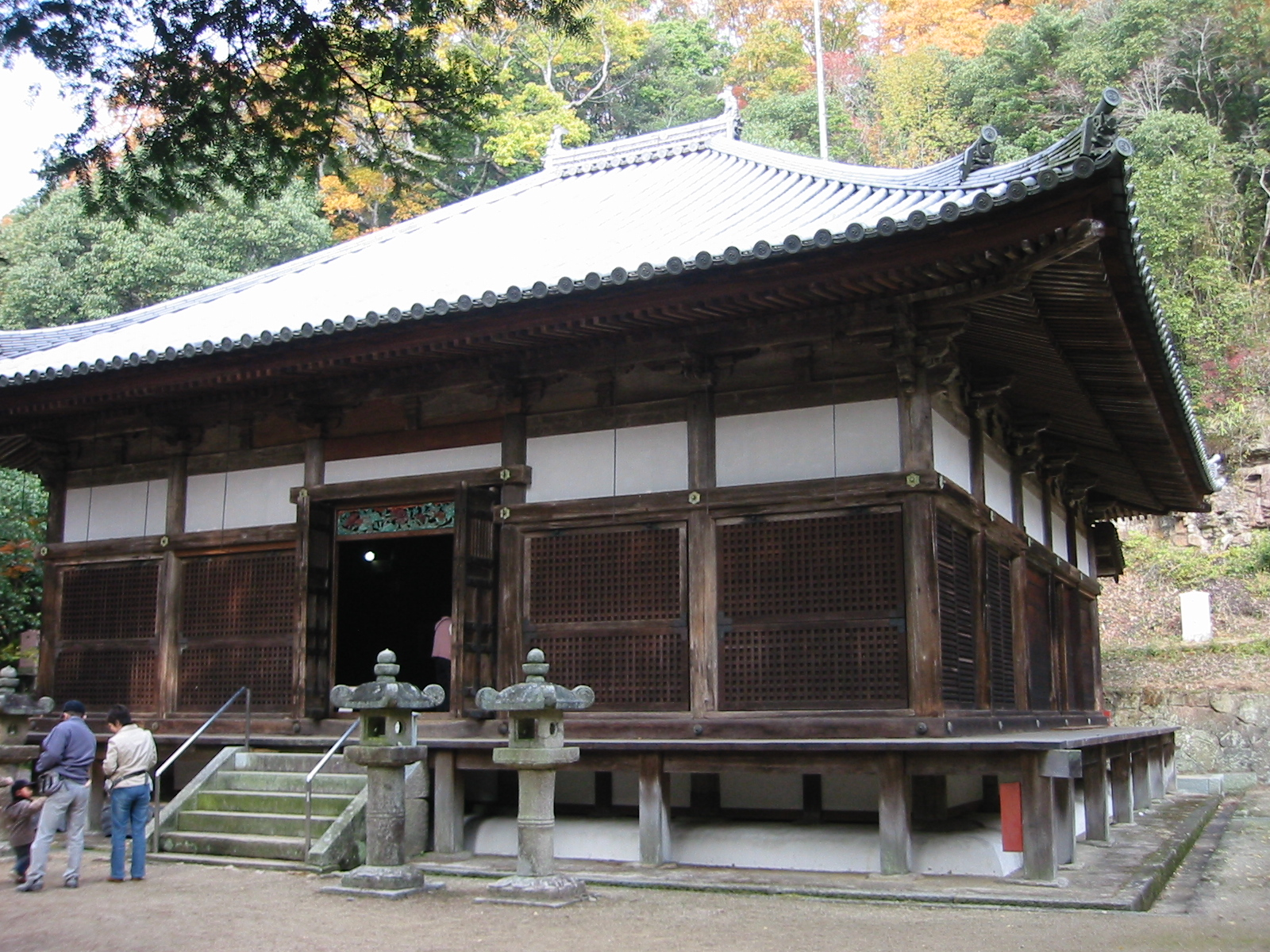

Religion
- Affiliation: Honzan Shugen, Tendai Jimon

Location
- Location: , Miki, Hyogo 651-2108
- Country: Japan
- Interactive map of Gaya-in

Architecture
- Completed: 645

Website
- https://www.gayain.or.jp/

Gaya-in (伽耶院) is a temple of the Honzan Shugen sect in Miki, Hyōgo Prefecture, Japan.

== Building list ==
- Main hall (1610).
- Two-story pagoda (Tahōtō) (1648).
- Misaka Ming shrine.
- Middle Gate - (1651)
- Kaisan-do - (1656)
- Gyoja-do - (1630)
- Temple gate

== Nationally Designated Important Cultural Property ==
There are four nationally designated cultural properties.

- Bishamonten wooden statue
- Main hall
- Two-story pagoda
- Main shrine

== Gallery ==
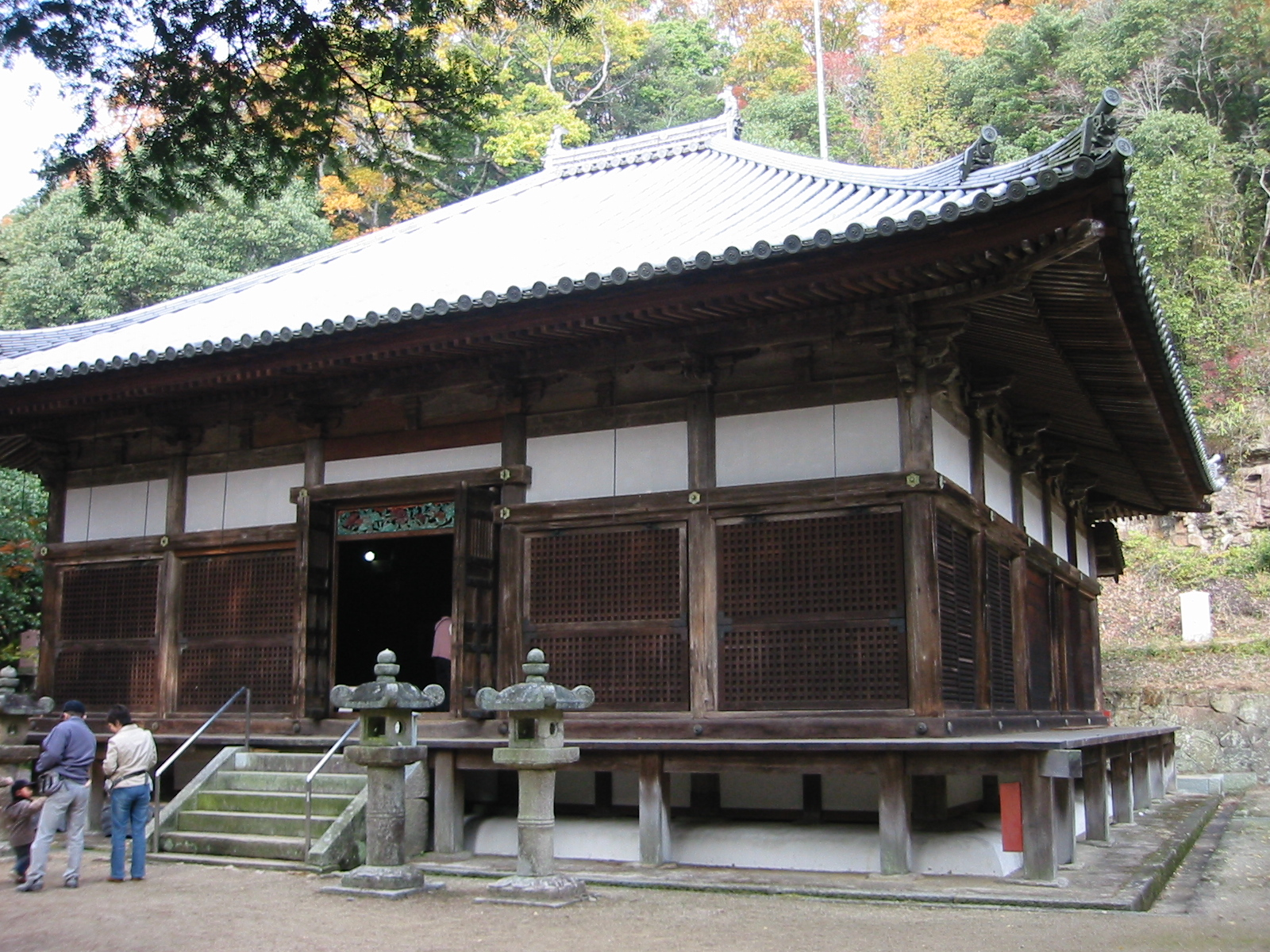

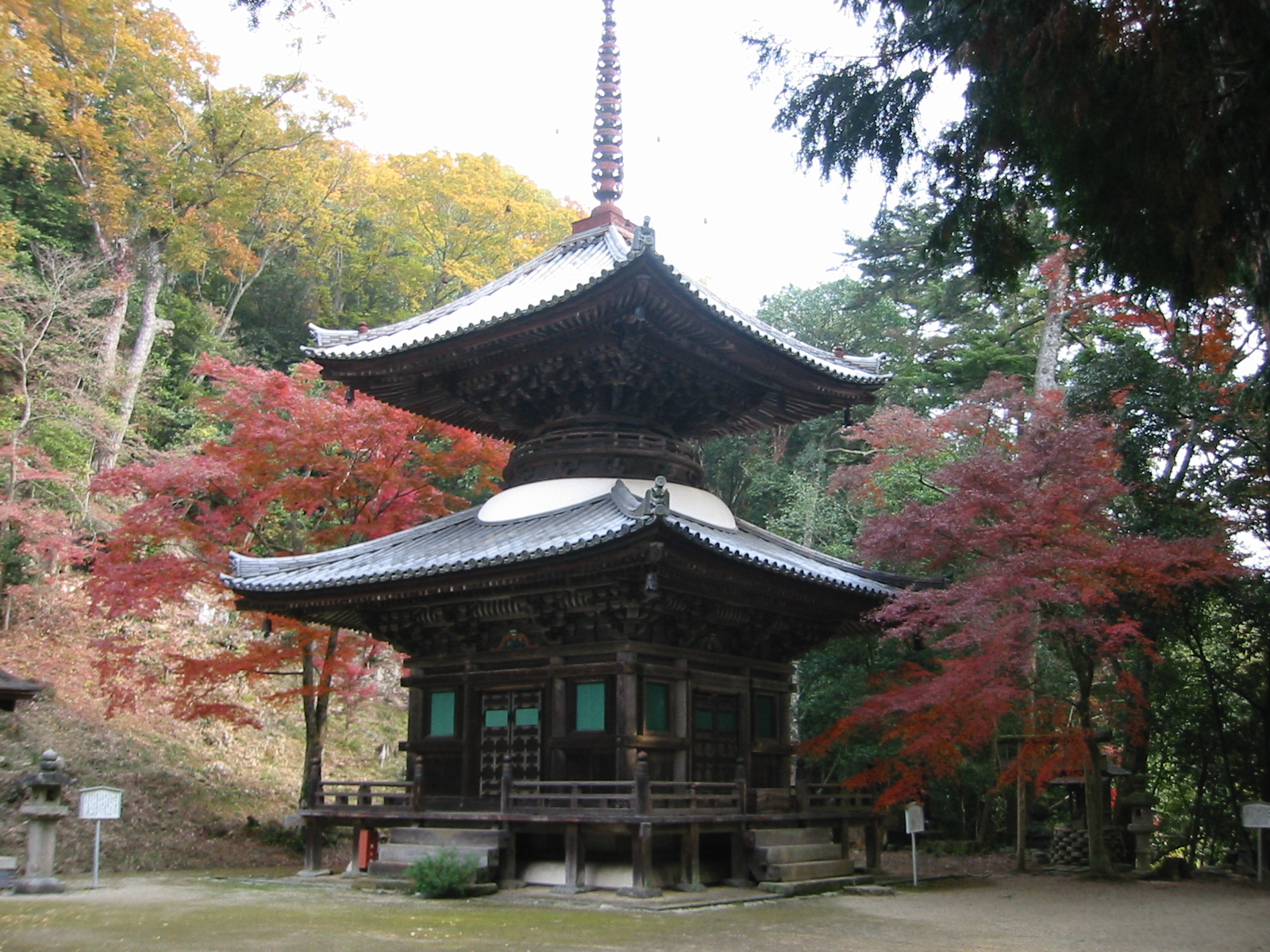

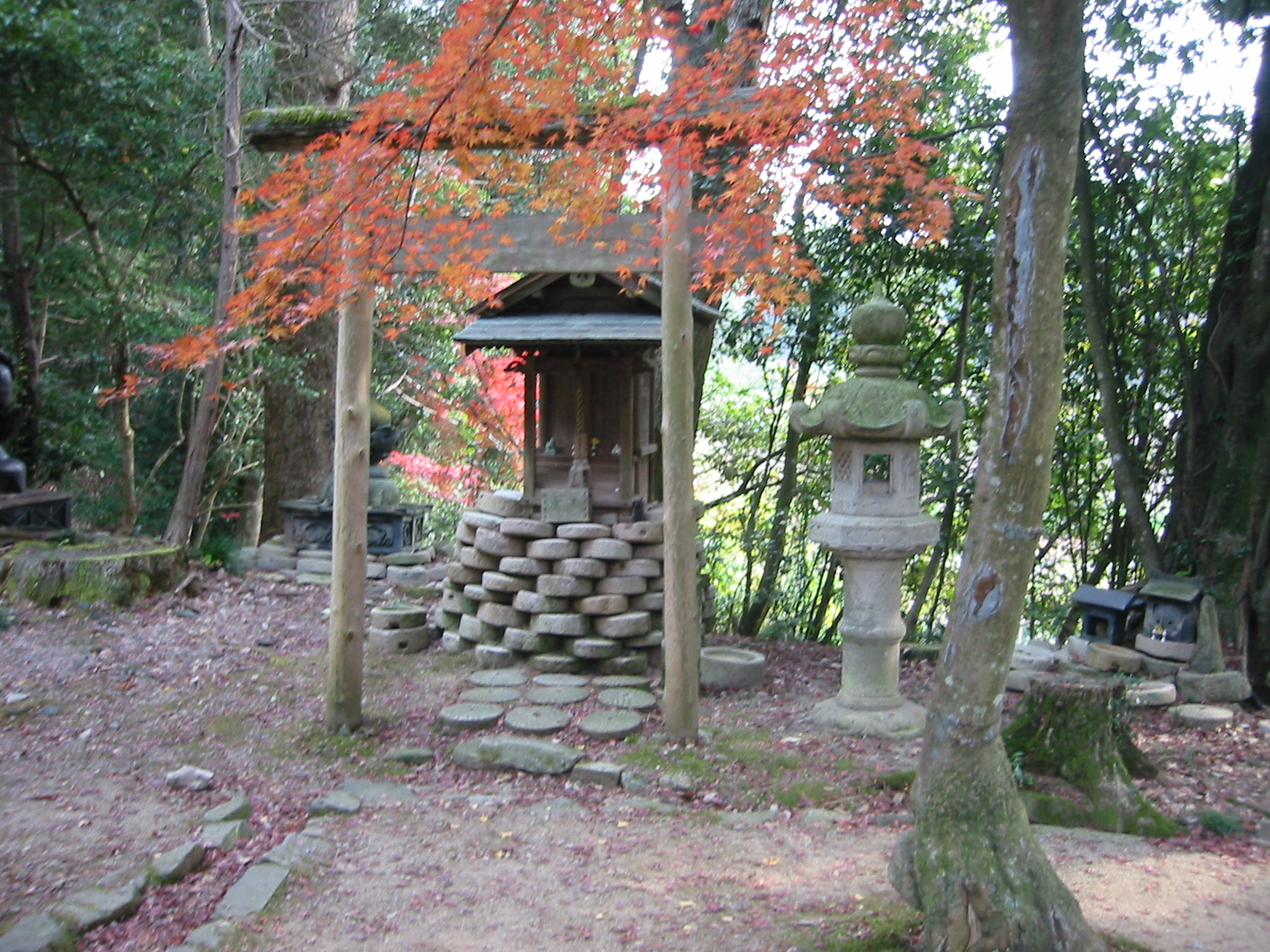

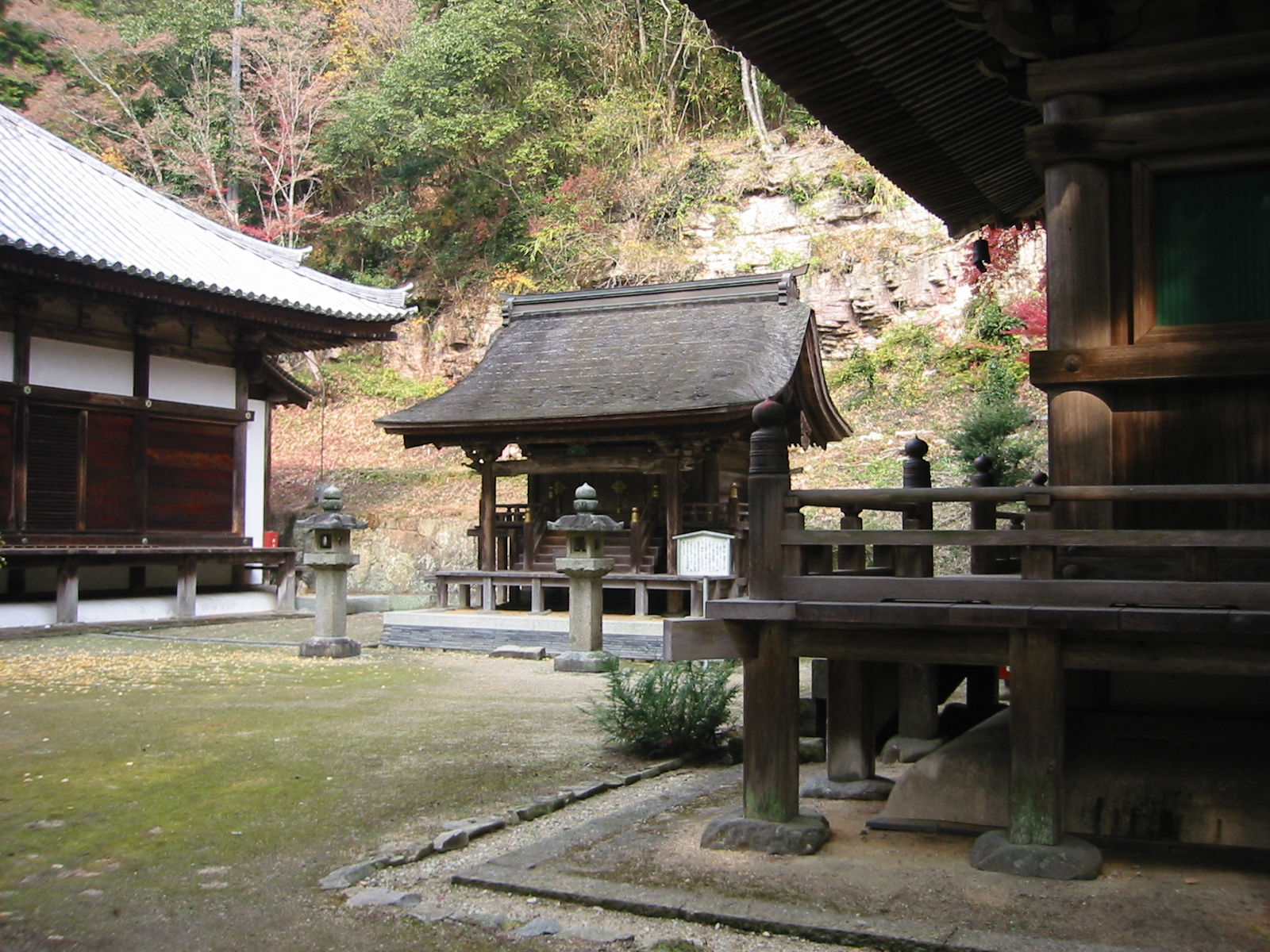
