= Takashi Shimizu (baseball) =

Japanese baseball player (born 1984)

Takashi Shimizu 清水 誉
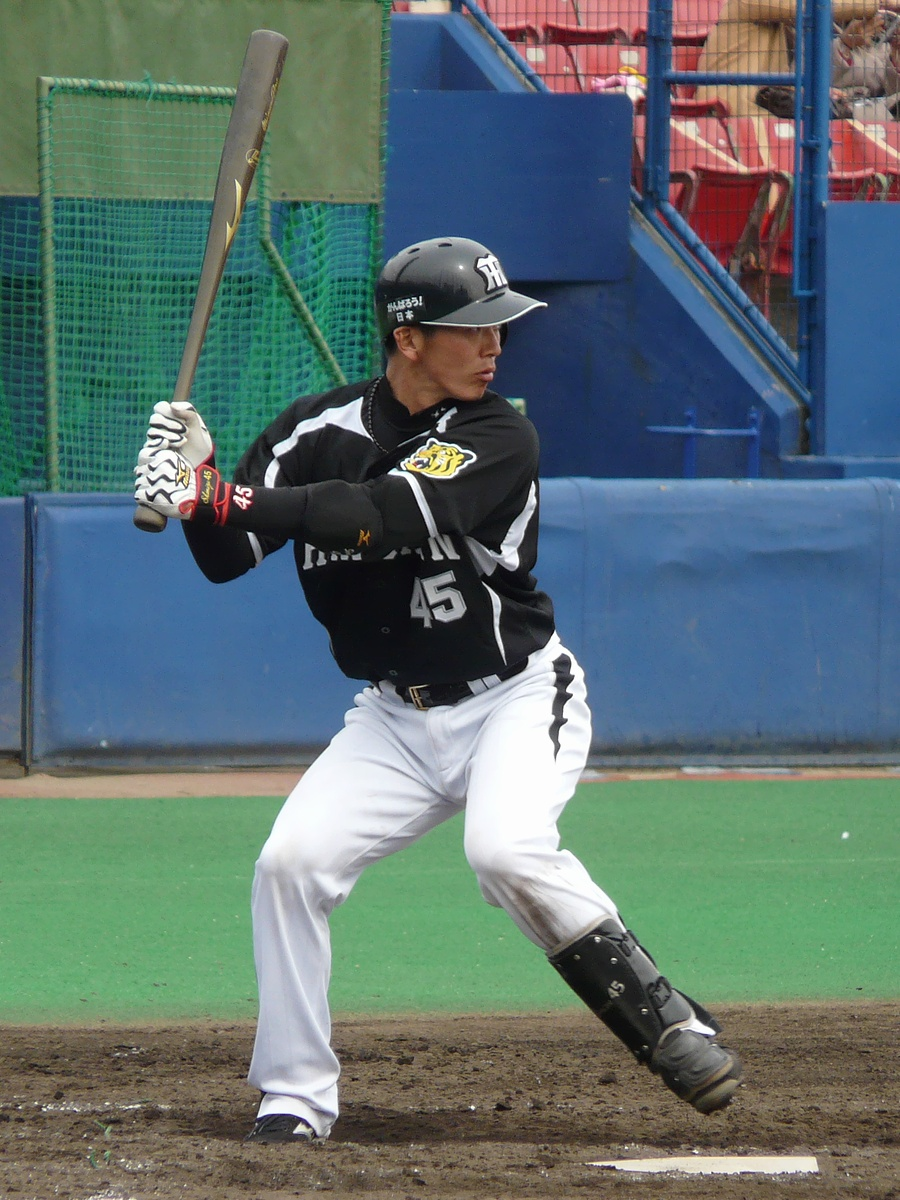
- Shimizu with the Hanshin Tigers
- Catcher
- Born: April 23, 1984 (age 41); Miki, Hyogo, Japan
- Bats: Right Throws: Right

debut
- April 4, 2009

NPB statistics (through 2015)
- Batting Average: .185
- Hits: 29
- RBIs: 5
- Stats at Baseball Reference

Teams
- Hanshin Tigers (2007–2016)
- Last updated on: November 15, 2015

Takashi Shimizu (Japanese: 清水 誉, Hepburn: Shimizu Takashi) is a professional baseball catcher for the Hanshin Tigers in Japan's Central League.

== Early life ==
Shimizu was born in Miki, Hyogo, Japan on 23 April 1984. He started playing baseball when he was in the second grade at Hirata Elementary School in Miki, becoming the team's catcher due to his strong arm. After leading Miki Junior High School to third place in a regional tournament as the team's catcher and number four batter, he wanted to enroll in a high school known for its baseball program. However, on his parents' advice that "only a handful can feed themselves playing baseball", he instead enrolled in the academically known Ono High School in Miki. He became the high school's main catcher in the summer of his first year, helping his team reach the quarter finals of the Hyogo Prefectural High School Tournament in his final year.

Heeding his parents advice further, Shimizu enrolled at Kwansei Gakuin University rather than trying to turn professional after high school. Due to an injury to the university club's main catcher, he was able to take the role immediately upon joining the club, remaining in the position for his four years of university. In his final year he was named in the Kansai University League's best nine in both the spring and autumn seasons. He had a total of 6 home runs while at university.

Shimizu was drafted by the Hanshin Tigers in the fourth round of the 2006 university/adult draft.

== Professional career ==
In 2007 Shimizu was evaluated highly during practice matches and pre-season matches, earning a place on the first-team roster for the start of the season. However, he did not get an opportunity to play for the first team and was eventually sent to the Tigers' farm team in the Western League. He played 41 games for the farm team, with a batting average of .260 and 5 home runs. In 2008, he played in 54 Western League matches, including 47 as a catcher. His batting average fell and he hit only 3 home runs. During the year he was wearing contact lenses, but underwent laser corrective surgery at the end of the year.

In 2009, he again started the season in the first-team squad due to leading catcher Akihiro Yano being injured. He made his first appearance for the Tigers' first team in the second match of the season, on 4 April 2009 against the Tokyo Yakult Swallows. On 17 May he made his first start and recorded his first hit, also against the Swallows. He appeared in a total of 20 first-team games, as well as 23 games for the farm team in which he had a batting average of .278.

== Personal life ==
At the end of the 2009 season Shimizu announced his intention to marry a classmate from his junior high school in December 2009.
