= Hirono Golf-jō-mae Station =

Railway station in Miki, Hyōgo Prefecture, Japan

Hirono Golf-jō-mae Station 広野ゴルフ場前駅
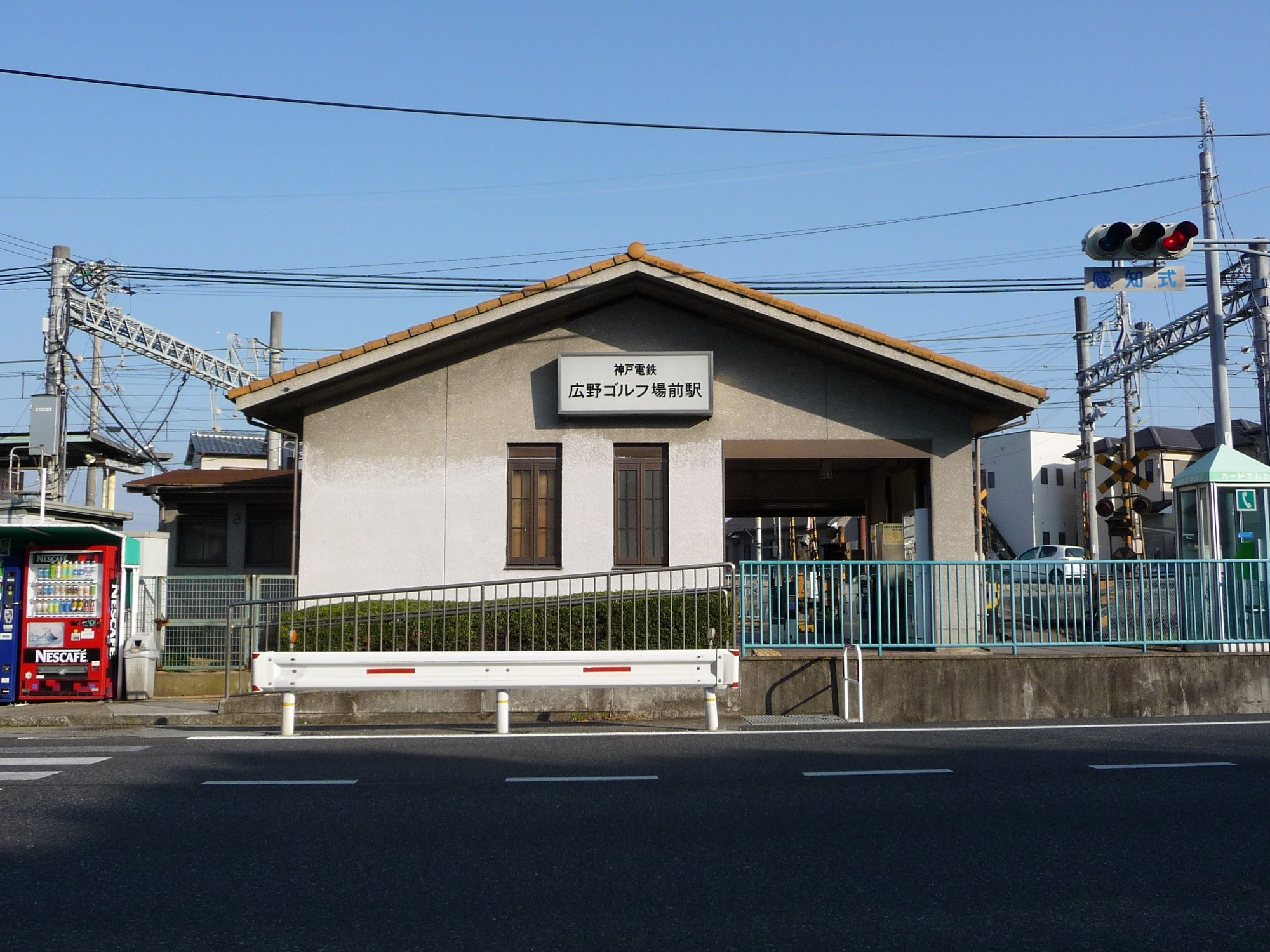
- Hirono Golf-jō-mae Station, December 2008

General information
- Location: 577-15, Shijimi-cho Hirono Aza Miyanominami Otsu, Miki-shi, Hyōgo-ken 673-0541; Japan
- Coordinates: 34°46′13″N 135°01′23″E
- Operator: Kobe Electric Railway
- Line: ■ Ao Line
- Distance: 13.5 km from Suzurandai
- Platforms: 1 island platform
- Connections

Other information
- Station code: KB49
- Website: Official website

History
- Opened: 8 March 1950
- Former names: Hirono Shinkai (1942 to 1951)

Passengers
- FY2019: 1545
Location
- Location within Hyōgo Prefecture Location within Japan

Hirono Golf-jō-mae Station (広野ゴルフ場前駅, Hirono Gorufujō-mae-eki) is a passenger railway station located in the city of Miki, Hyōgo Prefecture, Japan, operated by the private Kobe Electric Railway (Shintetsu).

== Lines ==
Hirono Golf-jō-mae Station is served by the Ao Line and is 13.5 kilometers from the terminus of the line at Suzurandai and is 21.0 kilometers from Minatogawa and 21.4 kilometers from Shinkaichi.

== Station layout ==
The station consists of a ground-level island platform connected to the station building by a level crossing. The station is unattended.

=== Platforms ===
1	■ Ao Line	for Ono and Ao
2	■ Ao Line	for Shijimi, Minatogawa and Shinkaichi

== Adjacent stations ==
«	Service	»
Shintetsu Ao Line
Express: Does not stop at this station
Semi-Express: Does not stop at this station
Midorigaoka	All trains	Shijimi

== History ==
Hirono Golf-jō-mae Station opened on December 28, 1936. It was renamed Hirono Shinkai Station (広野新開駅) on December 22, 1942 and reverted to its original name on April 1, 1951.

== Passenger statistics ==
In fiscal 2019, the station was used by an average of 474 passengers daily.

== Surrounding area ==
- Hirono Golf Club
- Miki Municipal Midorigaoka Elementary School
- Miki Special Needs School

== See also ==
- List of railway stations in Japan
