= Yokawa, Hyōgo =

Dissolved municipality in Hyōgo prefecture, Japan

Yokawa (吉川町, Yokawa-chō) was a town located in Mino District, Hyōgo Prefecture, Japan.

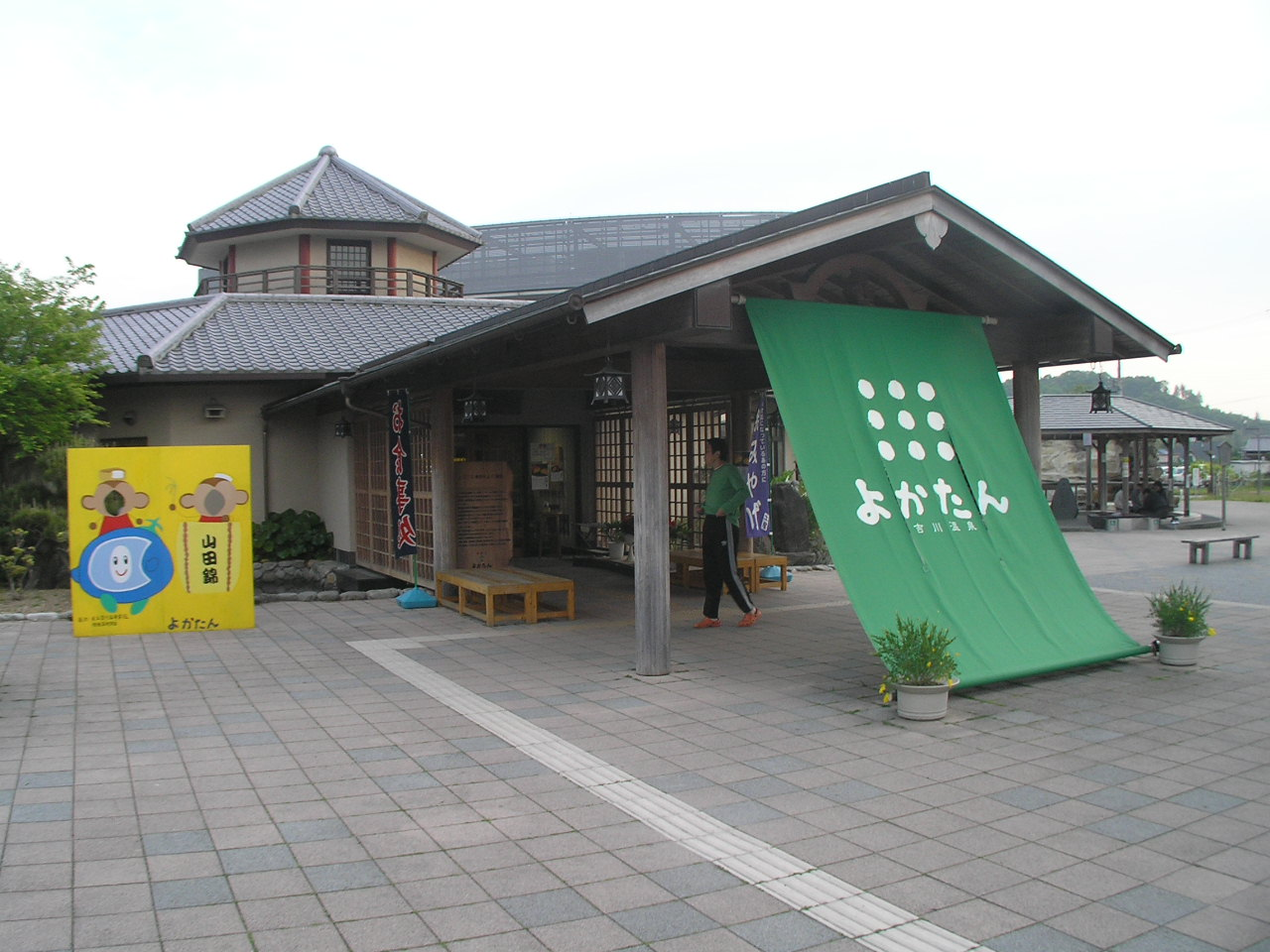
Yokawa-onsen

As of 2003, the town had an estimated population of 9,486 and a density of 168.04 persons per km^{2}. The total area was 56.45 km^{2}.

On October 24, 2005, Yokawa was merged into the expanded city of Miki.
