= Ōmiya Hachimangū (Tokyo) =

Shrine in Tokyo, Japan

- 大宮八幡宮
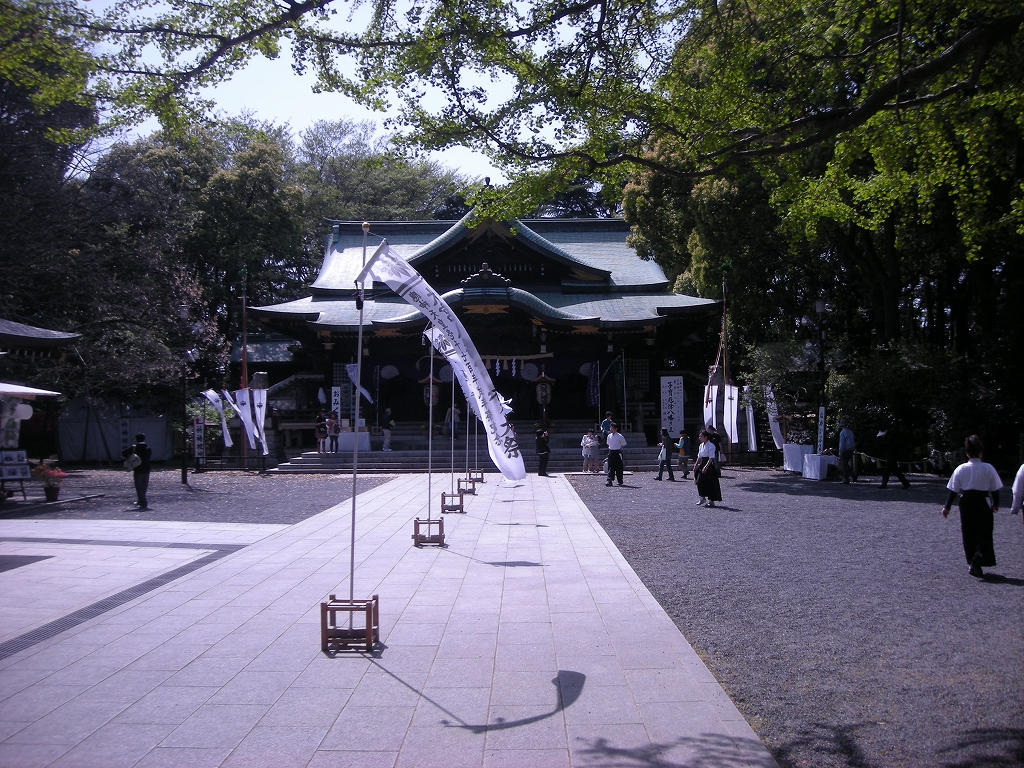

Religion
- Affiliation: Shinto
- Festival: September 15

Location
- Location: Suginami, Tokyo, Japan
- Interactive map of Ōmiya Hachimangū
- Coordinates: 35.6824°N 139.6397°E

Ōmiya Hachiman Shrine (大宮八幡宮, Ōmiya Hachimangū) is a Shinto shrine located in Suginami, Tokyo, Japan. It is a Hachiman shrine, dedicated to the kami Hachiman. It was established in 1063. Its main festival is held annually on September 15. Kami enshrined here include Emperor Ōjin, Empress Jingū and Emperor Chūai in addition to Hachiman.

== See also ==
- Hachiman shrine
- Ōmiya Hachiman Shrine (Hyōgo)
