= Ōmiya Hachiman Shrine (Hyōgo) =

Shinto shrine in Miki, Hyōgo Prefecture, Japan

Ōmiya Hachiman Shrine (大宮八幡宮, Ōmiya-Hachimangū)
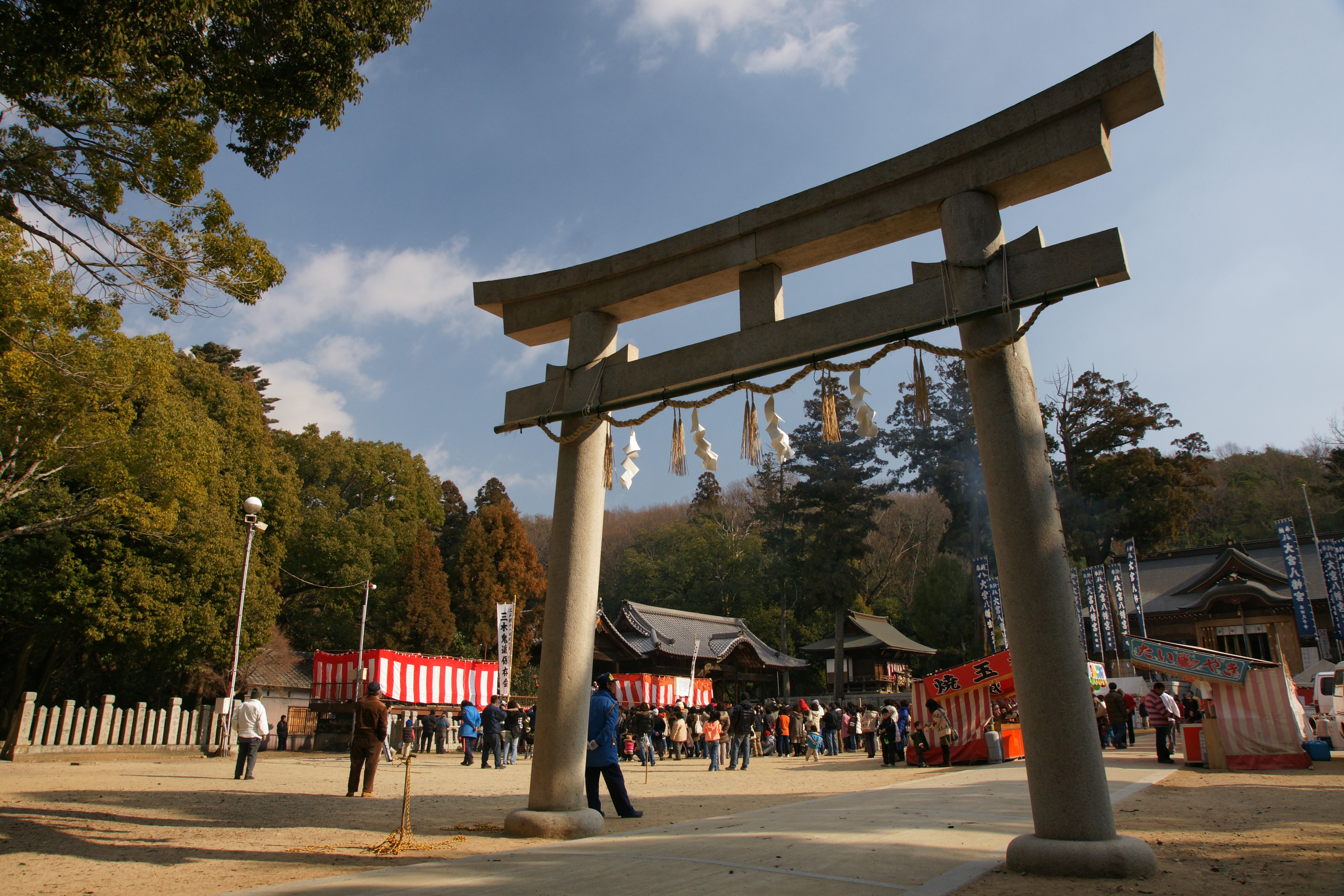
- Ōmiya Hachiman Shrine

- Location within Japan

Religion
- Affiliation: Shinto

Location
- Interactive map of Ōmiya Hachiman Shrine (大宮八幡宮, Ōmiya-Hachimangū)
- Coordinates: 34°47′42.1″N 134°59′8.4″E

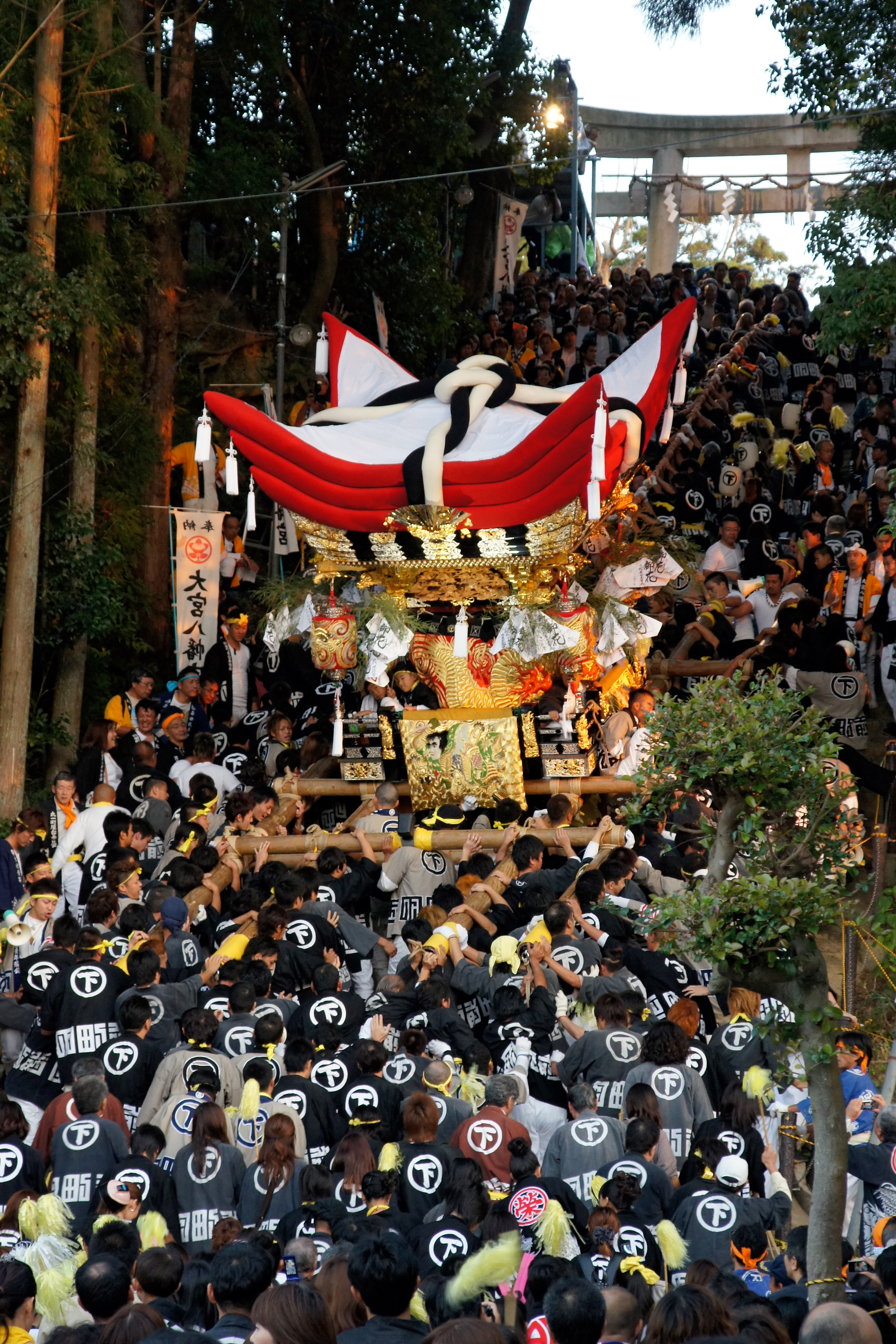
Miki Autumn Harvest Festival

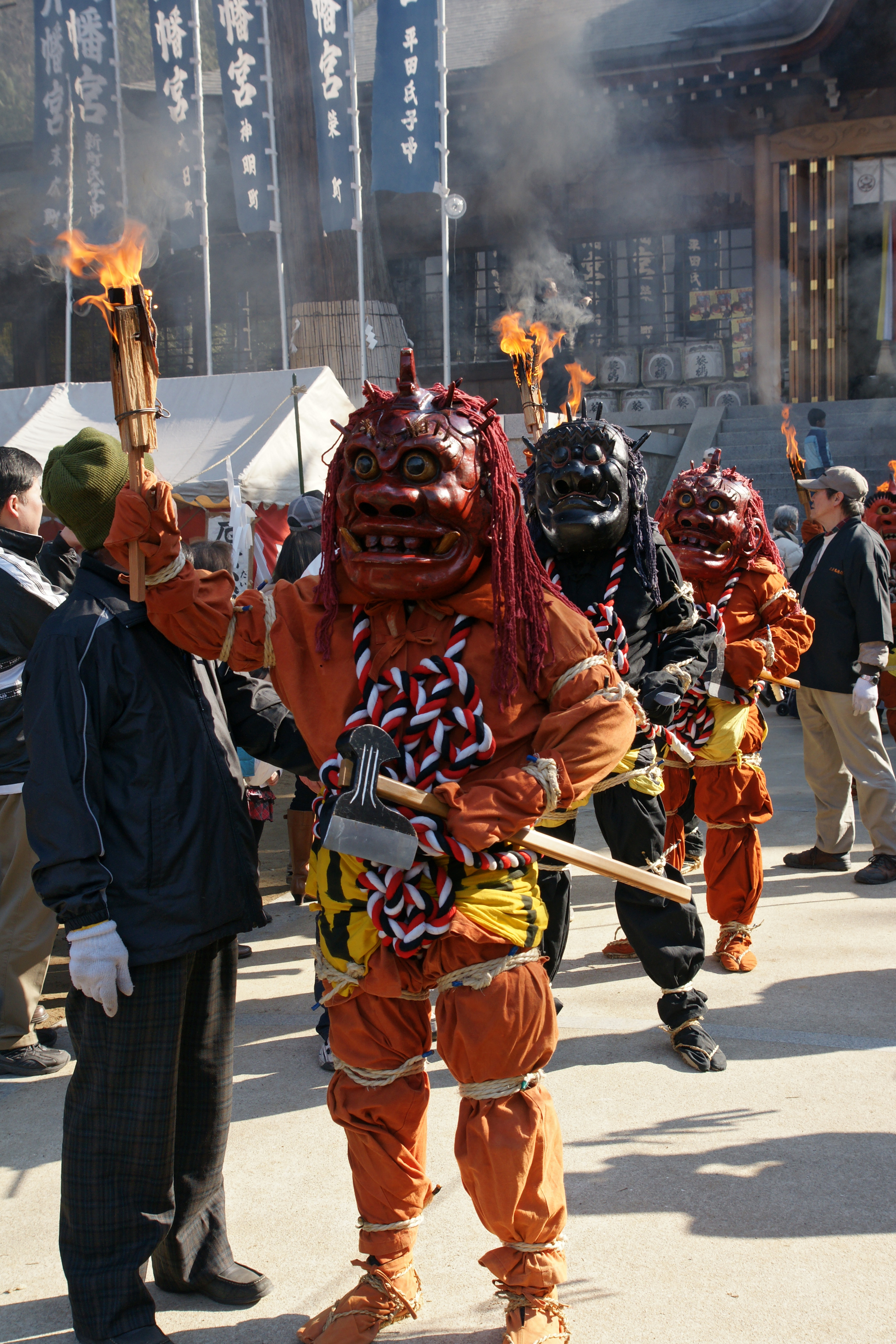
Oni-oi Shiki

Ōmiya Hachiman Shrine (大宮八幡宮, Ōmiya-Hachimangū) is a Shinto shrine in Miki, Hyōgo Prefecture, Japan. It is a Hachiman Shrine that was founded in 1111 and was rebuilt in 1585 after having burned down.

== Events ==
- Third Sunday in January: Oni-oi Shiki.
- Second and third Saturdays and Sundays in October: Miki Autumn Harvest Festival.

== See also ==
- Ōmiya Hachiman Shrine (Tokyo)

== Location ==
This shrine is near Miki station on the Ao Line of Kobe Electric Railway.
