= Ōmura Station (Hyōgo) =

Railway station in Miki, Hyōgo Prefecture, Japan

Ōmura Station 大村駅
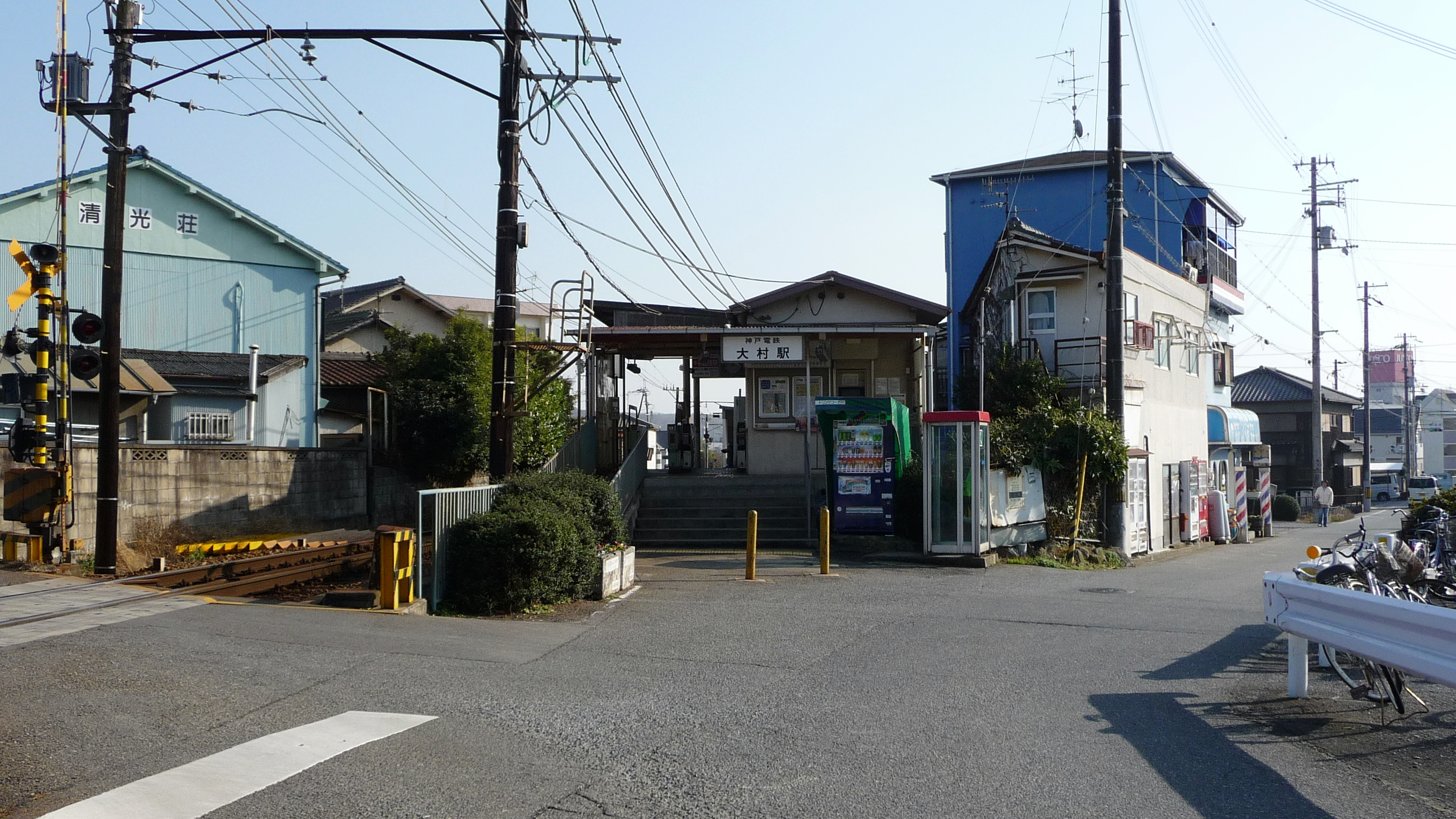
- Ōmura Station, December 2008

General information
- Location: 845-4, Ōmura Aza Tanijiri, Miki-shi, Hyōgo-ken 673-0404; Japan
- Coordinates: 34°48′31″N 134°58′17″E
- Operator: Kobe Electric Railway
- Line: ■ Ao Line
- Distance: 20.8 km from Suzurandai
- Platforms: 1 side platform
- Connections

Other information
- Station code: KB54
- Website: Official website

History
- Opened: 28 December 1951
- Former names: Dentetsu Ōmura (until 1988)

Passengers
- FY2019: 493
Location
- Location within Hyōgo Prefecture Location within Japan

Ōmura Station (大村駅, Ōmura-eki) is a passenger railway station located in the city of Miki, Hyōgo Prefecture, Japan, operated by the private Kobe Electric Railway (Shintetsu).

== Lines ==
Ōmura Station is served by the Ao Line and is 20.8 kilometers from the terminus of the line at Suzurandai and is 28.3 kilometers from Minatogawa and 28.7 kilometers from Shinkaichi.

== Station layout ==
The station consists of a ground-level side platform serving a single bi-directional track. The station is unattended.

== Adjacent stations ==
«	Service	»
Shintetsu Ao Line
Miki	Express	Kashiyama
Miki	Semi-Express	Kashiyama
Miki	Local	Kashiyama

== History ==
Ōmura Station opened on December 28, 1951. It was renamed Dentetsu-Ōmura Station (電鉄大村駅) on October 1, 1952, and reverted to its original name on April 1, 1988.

== Passenger statistics ==
In fiscal 2019, the station was used by an average of 493 passengers daily.

== Surrounding area ==
- Kongoji Temple
- Omura Hospital
- Miki City Hirata Elementary School

== See also ==
- List of railway stations in Japan
