= 2010 Empress's Cup =

Tournament details
- Country: Japan

Final positions
- Champions: INAC Kobe Leonessa
- Runners-up: Urawa Reds
- Semifinalists: Tokiwagi Gakuen High School LSC; Albirex Niigata

Statistics of Empress's Cup in the 2010 season.

== Overview ==
It was contested by 32 teams, and INAC Kobe Leonessa won the championship.

== Results ==
=== 1st round ===
- Je Vrille Kagoshima 1-0 Fukui University of Technology Fukui High School
- AC Nagano Parceiro 2-3 Fujieda Junshin High School
- Renaissance Kumamoto FC 0-3 Nippon TV Menina
- Seiwa Gakuen High School 1-2 Shizuoka Sangyo University
- Nippon Sport Science University 4-2 Bunnys Kyoto SC
- Musashigaoka College 2-4 Speranza FC Takatsuki
- Ehime Women's College 0-6 JFA Academy Fukushima
- Aguilas Kobe 0-2 Kamimura Gakuen High School

=== 2nd round ===
- Tokiwagi Gakuen High School LSC 6-0 Je Vrille Kagoshima
- Fujieda Junshin High School 1-1 (pen 4-2) AS Elfen Sayama FC
- Osaka University of Health and Sport Sciences 1-2 Nippon TV Menina
- Shizuoka Sangyo University 2-0 Norddea Hokkaido
- Hokkaido Bunkyo University Meisei High School 0-1 Nippon Sport Science University
- Speranza FC Takatsuki 2-2 (pen 4-5) Kibi International University
- Iga FC Kunoichi 2-0 JFA Academy Fukushima
- Kamimura Gakuen High School 4-3 Shimizudaihachi Pleiades

=== 3rd round ===
- Nippon TV Beleza 0-0 (pen 4-5) Tokiwagi Gakuen High School LSC
- Fujieda Junshin High School 2-2 (pen 6-5) Fukuoka J. Anclas
- Okayama Yunogo Belle 2-1 Nippon TV Menina
- Shizuoka Sangyo University 0-6 INAC Kobe Leonessa
- TEPCO Mareeze 5-0 Nippon Sport Science University
- Kibi International University 0-4 Albirex Niigata
- JEF United Chiba 2-1 Iga FC Kunoichi
- Kamimura Gakuen High School 0-6 Urawa Reds

=== Quarterfinals ===
- Tokiwagi Gakuen High School LSC 2-0 Fujieda Junshin High School
- Okayama Yunogo Belle 2-3 INAC Kobe Leonessa
- TEPCO Mareeze 2-3 Albirex Niigata
- JEF United Chiba 0-1 Urawa Reds

=== Semifinals ===
- Tokiwagi Gakuen High School LSC 0-5 INAC Kobe Leonessa
- Albirex Niigata 1-3 Urawa Reds

=== Final ===
- INAC Kobe Leonessa 1-1 (pen 3-2) Urawa Reds

INAC Kobe Leonessa won the championship.
