= Seiwa Gakuen College =

Private junior college in Japan

Coordinates: 38°18′23.8″N 140°48′43.7″E

- 聖和学園短期大学
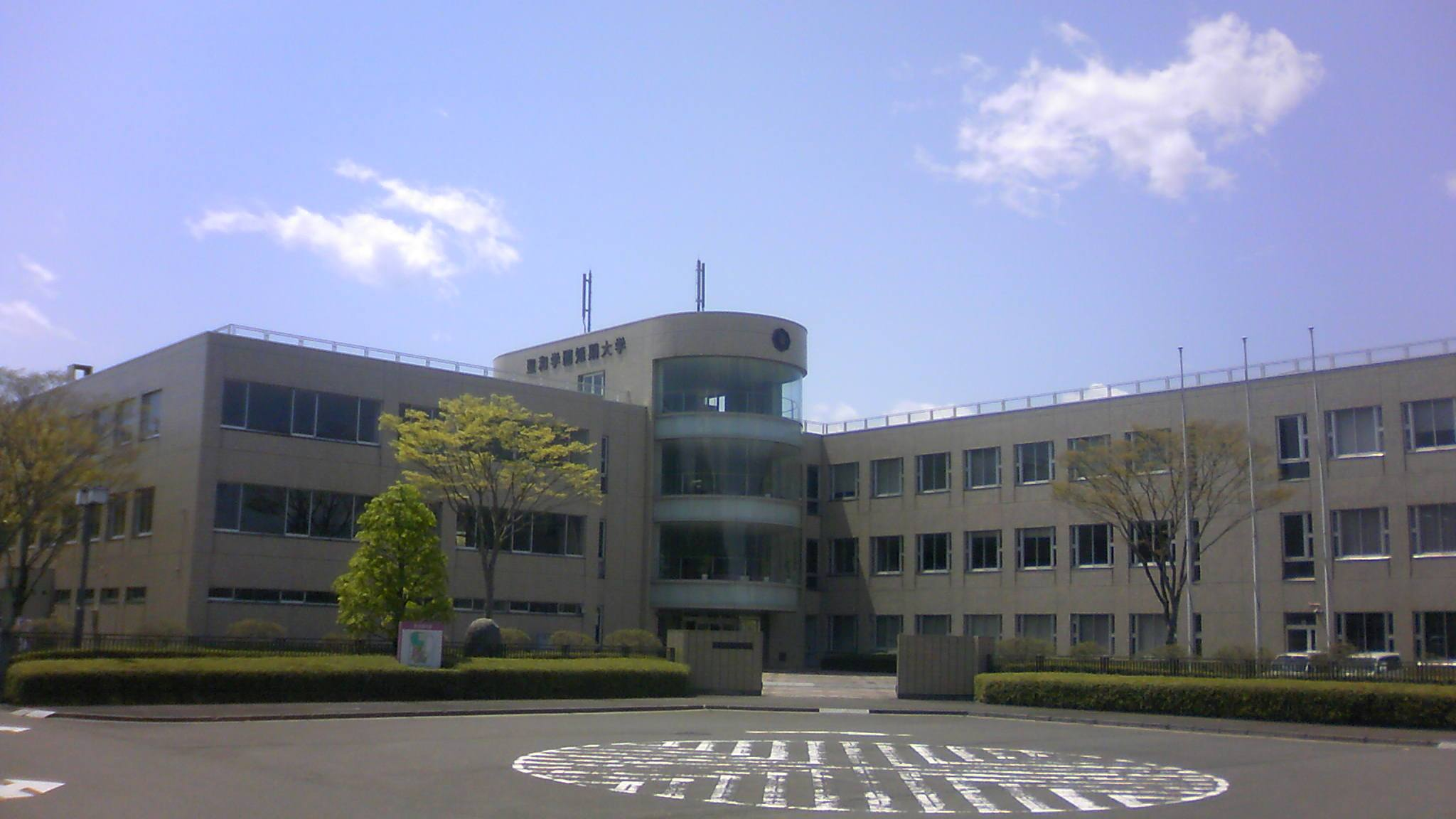
- Type: Private
- Established: 1951
- Location: Sendai, Japan
- Website: http://www.seiwa.ac.jp

Seiwa Gakuen College (聖和学園短期大学, Seiwa gakuen tanki daigaku) is a private junior college, located in Izumi-ku, Sendai, Miyagi Prefecture, Japan.

== History ==
The Yoshida Higher Girls School was opened in 1930. It was registered as a private junior college in 1951 and changed its name to its current name at that time. The school moved to its present campus in 1988.

== Organization ==
- School of Business Information Systems
- Department of Childcare and Welface
