= Midorigaoka Station (Hyōgo) =

Railway station in Miki, Hyōgo Prefecture, Japan

Midorigaoka Station 緑が丘駅
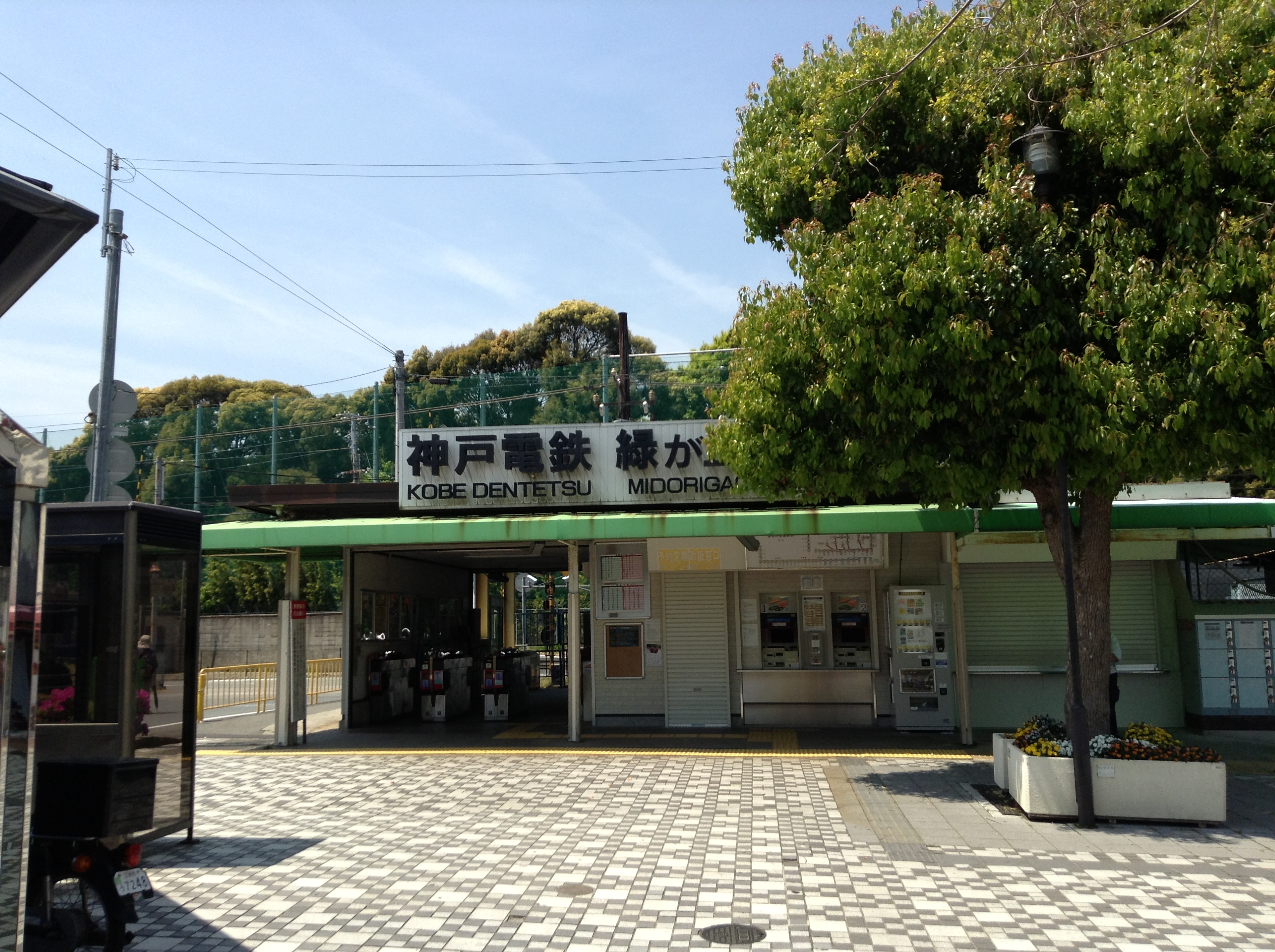
- Midorigaoka Station, May 2013

General information
- Location: 582-14, Shijimi-cho Hirono Aza Omawarinishi Otsu, Miki-shi, Hyōgo-ken 673-0534; Japan
- Coordinates: 34°45′54″N 135°01′33″E
- Operator: Kobe Electric Railway
- Line: ■ Ao Line
- Distance: 12.8 km from Suzurandai
- Platforms: 1 side platform
- Connections

Other information
- Station code: KB48
- Website: Official website

History
- Opened: 8 March 1950
- Former names: Hirono Yakyujo-mae (until 1958)

Passengers
- FY2019: 1545
Location
- Location within Hyōgo Prefecture Location within Japan

Midorigaoka Station (緑が丘駅, Midorigaoka-eki) is a passenger railway station located in the city of Miki, Hyōgo Prefecture, Japan, operated by the private Kobe Electric Railway (Shintetsu).

== Lines ==
Midorigaoka Station is served by the Ao Line and is 12.8 kilometers from the terminus of the line at Suzurandai and is 20.3 kilometers from Minatogawa and 20.7 kilometers from Shinkaichi.

== Station layout ==
The station consists of a ground-level side platform serving a single bi-directional track. The station is unattended.

== Adjacent stations ==
«	Service	»
Shintetsu Ao Line
Oshibedani	Express	Hirono Golf-jo-mae
Oshibedani	Semi-Express	Hirono Golf-jo-mae
Oshibedani	Local	Hirono Golf-jo-mae

== History ==
Midorigaoka Station opened on March 8, 1950 as Hirono Yakyūjō-mae Station (広野野球場前駅). It was renamed June 15, 1958.

== Passenger statistics ==
In fiscal 2019, the station was used by an average of 1545 passengers daily.

== Surrounding area ==
- Kansai University of International Studies
- Hyogo Prefectural Miki Kita High School
- Miki City Midorigaoka Sports Park

== See also ==
- List of railway stations in Japan
