= Tokiwagi Gakuen High School LSC =

Women's association football team in Rifu, Japan

- Nickname: Tokiwagi Gakuen
- Founded: 1995
- Ground: Miyagi Grand Stadium, Rifu, Miyagi, Japan
- Capacity: 6,700
- Manager: Yoshiharu Abe (since 1995)
- League: Tōhoku Women's Football League
Home colours	Away colours

Tokiwagi Gakuen High School LSC (常盤木学園高等学校サッカー部) is a Japanese women's football team that plays in the regional fourth-division Tōhoku Women's Football League.

It notably competed as a high school club of youth players in semi-professional senior Japan women's football leagues from 2010 to 2019, most recently in the third-tier Nadeshiko League Division 2, and won the third-tier Challenge League in 2015. In high-school competition, the club has also won five national All Japan High School Women's Soccer Tournament championships, most recently in 2012.

== History ==
=== Founding ===
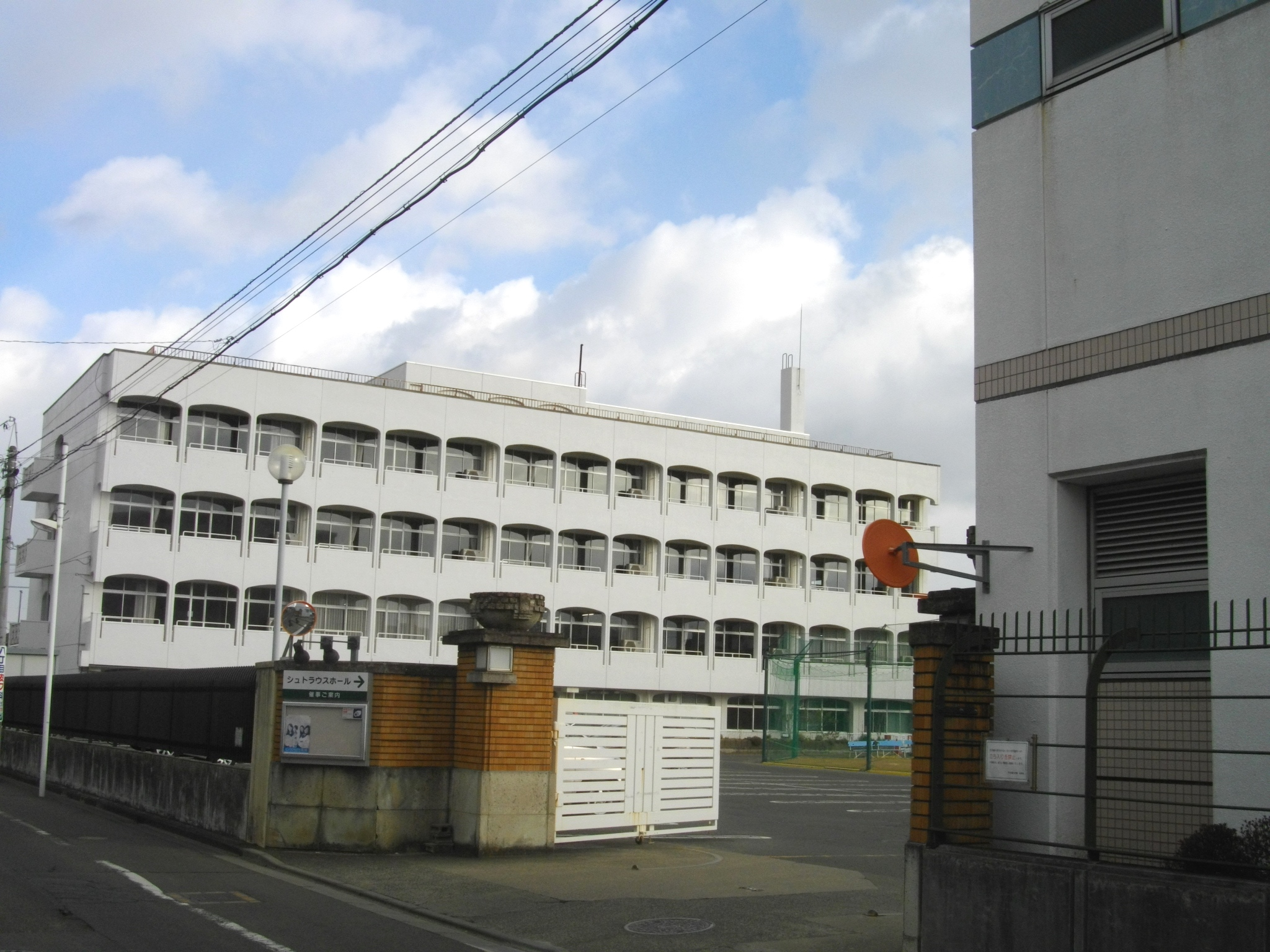
Tokiwagi Gakuen High School in 2015.

The club was founded in 1995 by Yoshiharu Abe as part of the private residential high school's sports program. In 2002, the club won its first All Japan championship, raising its profile among youth players and attracting remote prospects in order to become professionals or be selected for the Japan women's national football team. In 2010, Abe applied for the club to enter the second-tier Challenge League EAST and was accepted. The resulting change required Abe to fund the team and its housing himself because the league competition was outside of the high school athletic federation's jurisdiction. As of 2011, the school had more than 40 resident players.

Part of Abe's founding philosophy was the abolition of traditional age- or school year-based hierarchical relationships within the team, allowing younger players to speak and work freely with older players. Based on struggles he experienced as a boys' youth coach, Abe believed this autonomy and equality among teammates fostered better teamwork than deference by age, and that it was more encouraging for developing the technical skills of beginners and leadership skills of veterans within the team.

=== 2011 Fukushima nuclear disaster ===
The 2011 Tōhoku earthquake and tsunami and ensuing Fukushima nuclear disaster forced Tokiwagi Gakuen to play its 2011 Challenge League home opener in Iwata, Shizuoka.

On 15 April 2012, Tokiwagi Gakuen faced Vegalta Sendai, a team composed of former top-division TEPCO Mareeze players displaced by the disaster, in Vegalta Sendai's initial second-division Challenge League home match. In front of a capacity 6,500-attendance crowd, Tokiwagi Gakuen drew Vegalta Sendai 1–1.

== Competitions ==
=== High school ===
The club competes in Japanese inter-high school competitions, including the national All Japan High School Women's Soccer Tournament, which the club won in 2002, 2008, 2009, 2011, and 2012.

=== National leagues ===
From 2010 until its relegation to regional leagues in 2019, Tokiwagi Gakuen also competed in senior division of Japanese club football against dedicated academies, universities, and senior club teams. As of 2014, it was the only high school to compete in the second tier of Japanese club football.

Behind top scorer and most valuable player Rikako Kobayashi, Tokiwagi Gakuen achieved its best result in league play by winning the third-tier Challenge League in 2015. As a high-school club, the team was ineligible to compete for promotion to the second-tier Nadeshiko League Division 2. Kobayashi also won the 2015 AFC young player of the year award.

=== Regional leagues ===
After its relegation from the Challenge League in 2019, Tokiwagi Gakuen began competing in the fourth-division regional Tōhoku Women's Football League division 1 upon the league's establishment in 2021. The league comprises clubs in Aomori, Iwate, Miyagi, Akita, Yamagata, and Fukushima prefectures. Tokiwagi Gakuen won the league in 2021 over Sendai University and qualified for the Empress's Cup as a result, but did not win promotion to third-tier Nadeshiko League Division 2.

=== Empress's Cup ===
The club also competes in the national senior Empress's Cup competition, with its best result as semifinalists in 2010 after defeating 2010 Nadeshiko League and 2009 Empress's Cup champions Nippon TV Beleza in a quarterfinal penalty shoot-out upset.

==== Results ====
- 2010 Empress's Cup: Third place
- 2014 Empress's Cup: Quarterfinals

=== International competition ===
Tokiwagi Gakuen also competes in overseas international youth football tournaments, such as the annual USA Cup in the United States.

=== Notable former players ===
Aya Sameshima, 2003–2005
More than 100 caps for top-division professional clubs in Japan, the United States, and France, 2011 FIFA Women's World Cup champion, 2012 Summer Olympics silver medalist
Asuna Tanaka, 2004–2006
More than 100 caps for top-division professional clubs in Japan, South Korea, and Germany, two league and five cup championships across five competitions, 2011 FIFA Women's World Cup champion
Saki Kumagai, 2006–2008
More than 100 caps for top-division Olympique Lyon, eight league titles across two leagues, six Coupe de France championships, five UEFA Women's Champions League championships, 2011 FIFA Women's World Cup champion
Miki Ito, 2011–2013
More than 100 caps for top-division INAC Kobe Leonessa, 2015 and 2016 Emperess's Cup champion, 2021-22 WE League champion, 2021–22 WE League outstanding player award
Nana Ichise
Rikako Kobayashi
Mai Kyokawa
Fumina Shibayama, 2017-2019

== Honors ==
- Empress's Cup: 2010 bronze
- Challenge League: 2015
- Tōhoku Women's Football League: 2021

== See also ==
- List of women's football clubs in Japan
