= Miki, Hyōgo =

Miki 三木市
- City
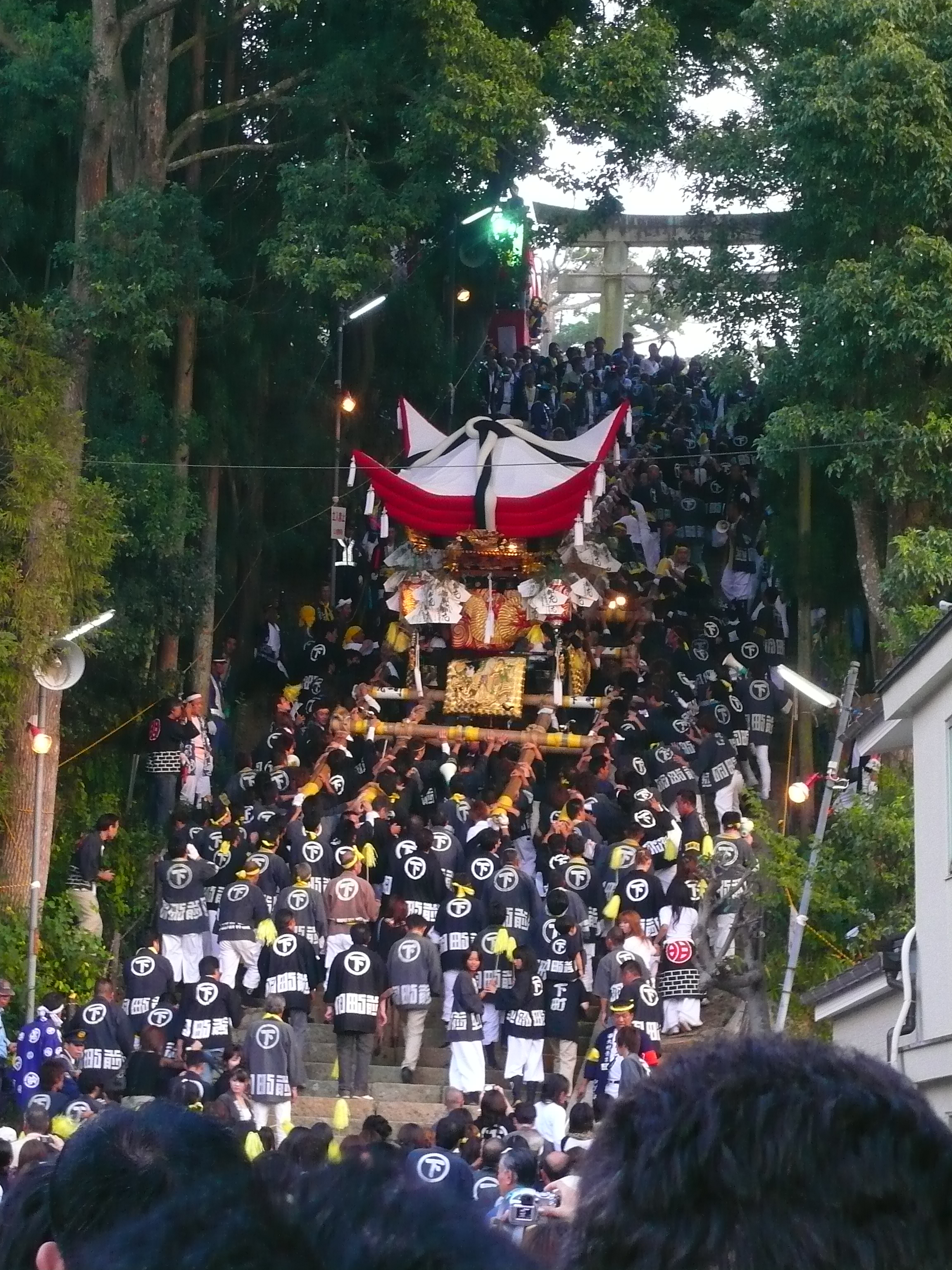
- Ōmiya Hachiman Shrine autumn festival

- Flag Emblem

- Location of Miki in Hyōgo prefecture

- Location in Japan
- Coordinates: 34°47′37″N 134°59′35″E
- Country: Japan
- Region: Kansai
- Prefecture: Hyōgo

Government
  - Mayor: Kazuhiko Nakata (since July 2017)

Area
  - Total: 176.51 km^{2} (68.15 sq mi)

Population (September 30, 2022)
  - Total: 75,009
  - Density: 424.96/km^{2} (1,100.6/sq mi)
- Time zone: UTC+09:00 (JST)
- City hall address: 10-30 Uenomaru, Miki-shi, Hyōgo-ken 673-0492
- Climate: Cfa
- Website: Official website
- Symbols
- Flower: Rhododendron
- Tree: Pinus

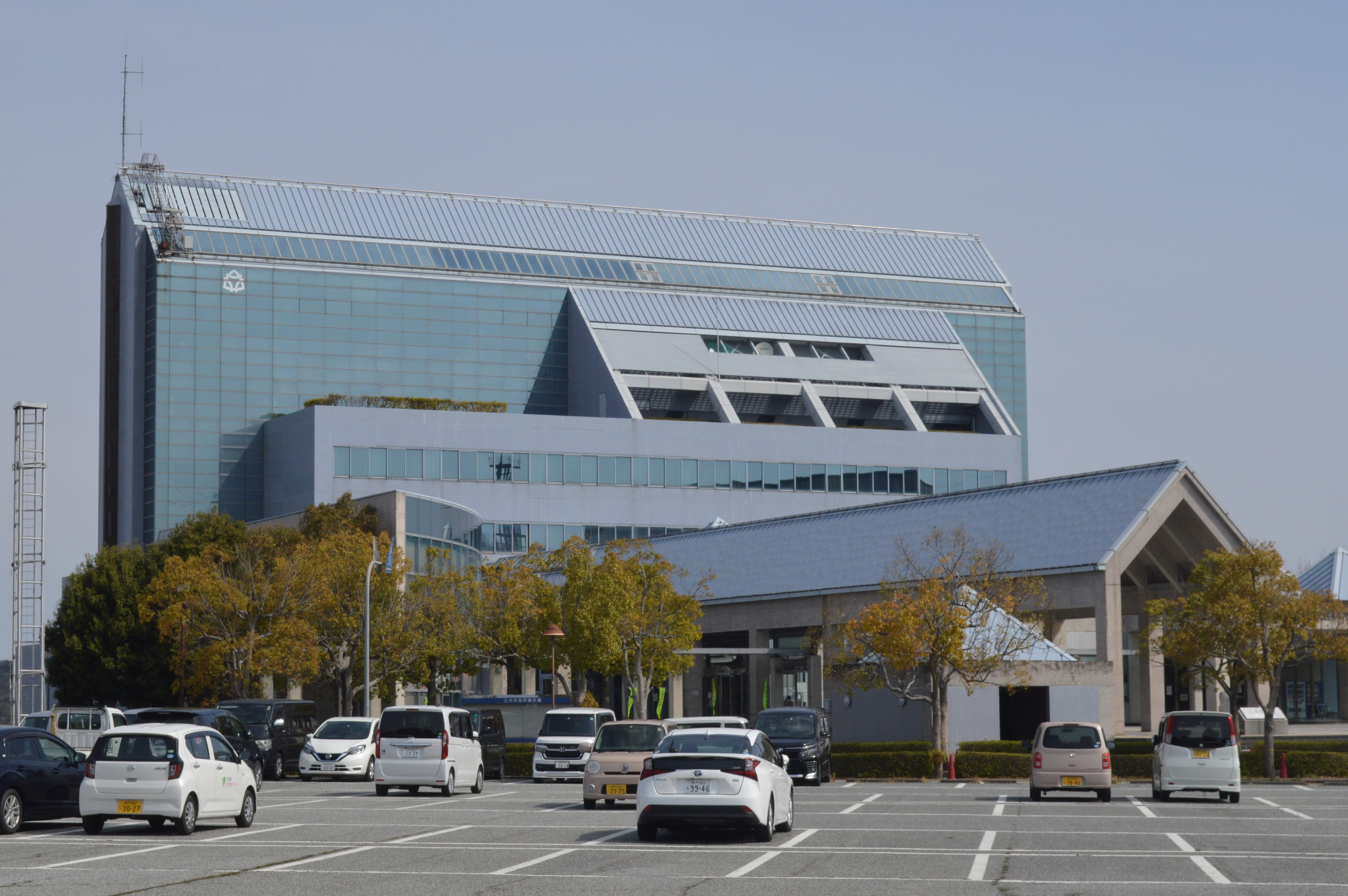
Miki City Hall

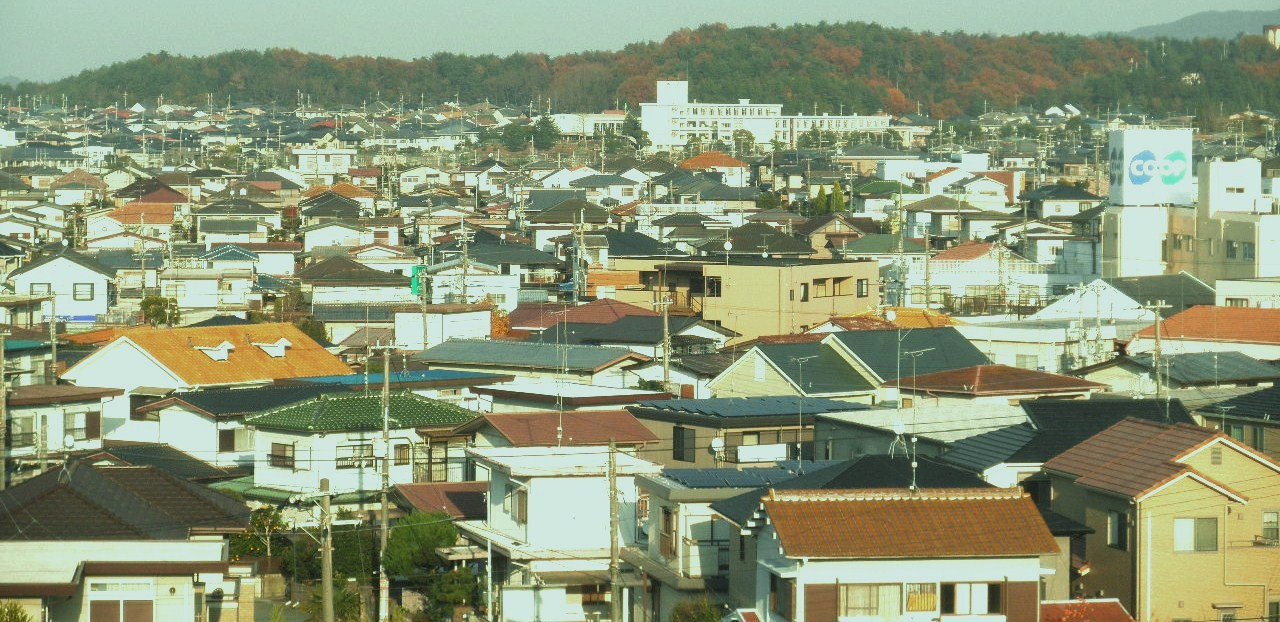
Midorigaoka in Miki

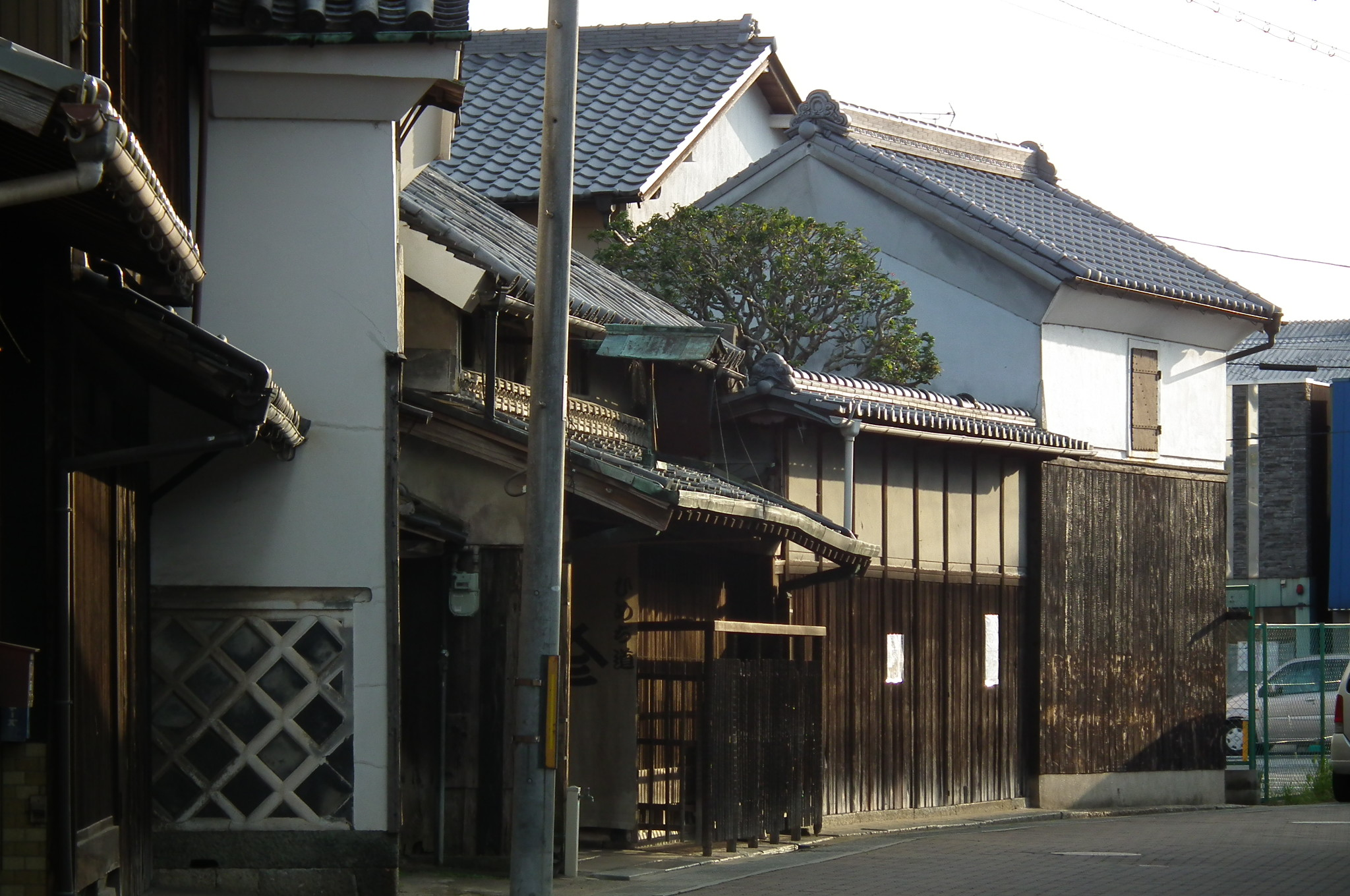
Old houses in Miki

Miki (三木市, Miki-shi) is a city in Hyōgo Prefecture, Japan. As of 30 September 2022, the city had an estimated population of 75,009 and a population density of 420 persons per km^{2}. The total area of the city is 176.51 square kilometres (68.15 sq mi).

== Geography ==
Miki is located in the southwestern part of Hyogo prefecture, northwest of Kobe, on the 135th meridian east line. It is included in the Harima Plain on the west side of the Rokko Mountains and on the south side of the Chugoku Mountains, and the Mino River flows from east to west in the city area. Fluvial terraces and gentle hills spread around the plains. Since it is inland, precipitation is relatively low and there are many ponds. There is an old town along the Mino River, and a new residential area near the border with Kobe City in the southeastern part. The highest point in the city is 453 meters above sea level on Mt. Shibire.

=== Neighboring municipalities ===
Hyōgo Prefecture

- Inami
- Kakogawa
- Katō
- Kobe
- Ono
- Sanda

=== Climate ===
Miki has a humid subtropical climate (Köppen climate classification Cfa) with hot summers and cool to cold winters. Precipitation is significantly higher in summer than in winter, though on the whole lower than most parts of Honshū, and there is no significant snowfall. The average annual temperature in Miki is 15.1 °C (59.2 °F). The average annual rainfall is 1,220.7 mm (48.06 in) with July as the wettest month. The temperatures are highest on average in August, at around 27.1 °C (80.8 °F), and lowest in January, at around 3.8 °C (38.8 °F). The highest temperature ever recorded in Miki was 37.8 °C (100.0 °F) on 24 July 2018; the coldest temperature ever recorded was −8.3 °C (17.1 °F) on 27 February 1981.

Climate data for Miki (1991−2020 normals, extremes 1977−present)
Month	Jan	Feb	Mar	Apr	May	Jun	Jul	Aug	Sep	Oct	Nov	Dec	Year
Record high °C (°F)	16.7 (62.1)	19.2 (66.6)	22.0 (71.6)	28.2 (82.8)	30.9 (87.6)	34.9 (94.8)	37.8 (100.0)	36.9 (98.4)	35.1 (95.2)	30.5 (86.9)	26.9 (80.4)	21.6 (70.9)	37.8 (100.0)
Mean daily maximum °C (°F)	8.2 (46.8)	9.0 (48.2)	12.5 (54.5)	18.1 (64.6)	23.0 (73.4)	26.0 (78.8)	29.5 (85.1)	31.4 (88.5)	27.7 (81.9)	22.2 (72.0)	16.4 (61.5)	10.8 (51.4)	19.6 (67.2)
Daily mean °C (°F)	3.8 (38.8)	4.4 (39.9)	7.8 (46.0)	13.2 (55.8)	18.2 (64.8)	21.9 (71.4)	25.8 (78.4)	27.1 (80.8)	23.2 (73.8)	17.4 (63.3)	11.5 (52.7)	6.2 (43.2)	15.0 (59.1)
Mean daily minimum °C (°F)	−0.2 (31.6)	0.1 (32.2)	3.0 (37.4)	8.2 (46.8)	13.5 (56.3)	18.3 (64.9)	22.7 (72.9)	23.7 (74.7)	19.5 (67.1)	13.2 (55.8)	7.0 (44.6)	2.0 (35.6)	10.9 (51.7)
Record low °C (°F)	−6.2 (20.8)	−8.3 (17.1)	−4.6 (23.7)	−1.4 (29.5)	3.5 (38.3)	8.8 (47.8)	14.7 (58.5)	15.6 (60.1)	8.6 (47.5)	2.4 (36.3)	−1.0 (30.2)	−4.9 (23.2)	−8.3 (17.1)
Average precipitation mm (inches)	37.2 (1.46)	52.8 (2.08)	93.9 (3.70)	98.6 (3.88)	123.1 (4.85)	158.9 (6.26)	167.7 (6.60)	97.8 (3.85)	164.6 (6.48)	119.9 (4.72)	64.4 (2.54)	47.7 (1.88)	1,220.7 (48.06)
Average precipitation days (≥ 1.0 mm)	5.1	6.4	9.2	9.4	9.4	11.4	10.2	6.7	10.1	8.4	6.1	5.8	98.2
Mean monthly sunshine hours	145.5	138.2	165.6	191.6	194.5	143.4	169.7	214.5	152.3	166.3	149.2	146.3	1,973.3
Source: Japan Meteorological Agency

=== Demographics ===
Per Japanese census data, the population of Miki in 2020 is 75,294 people. Miki has been conducting censuses since 1920.

Historical population
Year	Pop.	±%
1920	33,644	—
1925	35,564	+5.7%
1930	37,074	+4.2%
1935	37,304	+0.6%
1940	38,160	+2.3%
1945	47,985	+25.7%
1950	47,951	−0.1%
1955	48,240	+0.6%
1960	47,062	−2.4%
1965	46,688	−0.8%
1970	49,071	+5.1%
1975	63,746	+29.9%
1980	78,297	+22.8%
1985	82,636	+5.5%
1990	84,445	+2.2%
1995	86,562	+2.5%
2000	86,117	−0.5%
2005	84,361	−2.0%
2010	81,038	−3.9%
2015	77,178	−4.8%
2020	75,294	−2.4%
Miki population statistics

== History ==
The area of the modern city of Mino was within ancient Harima Province, and developed as a castle town at the foot of Miki Castle during the Muromachi period. During the Sengoku period, the castle was destroyed in the Siege of Miki. In the Edo Period, the area was controlled by Himeji Domain. The town of Miki was established within Mino District, Hyōgo with the creation of the modern municipalities system on April 1, 1889. It was raised to city status on June 1, 1954. On October 24, 2005, the town of Yokawa (from Mino District) was merged into Miki.

== Government ==
Miki has a mayor-council form of government with a directly elected mayor and a unicameral city council of 16 members. Miki contributes one member to the Hyogo Prefectural Assembly. In terms of national politics, the city is part of Hyōgo 4th district of the lower house of the Diet of Japan.

== Economy ==
Miki has had an industrial economy based on metalworking from the early Edo Period, and continues to promote itself nationwide as the main production area for hand tools and hardware. Agriculture, notably the growing of "Yamada Nishiki" brand rice and vineyards for the production of grapes is also important. The central and northern parts of the city have numerous golf courses and forest areas for recreation. The city is increasingly becoming a commuter town for Kobe and Osaka due to its proximity.

== Education ==
Miki has 13 public elementary schools, six public middle schools and one combined elementary/middle school operated by the city government and four public high school operated by the Hyōgo Prefectural Department of Education. The prefecture also operates one special education school for the handicapped. A private college, the Kansai University of International Studies, is located in Izumi.

== Transportation ==
=== Railway ===
Kobe Electric Railway (Shintetsu) – Ao Line

- Midorigaoka - Hirono Golf-jō-mae - Shijimi - Ebisu - Miki Uenomaru - Miki - Ōmura

=== Highway ===
- San'yō Expressway
- Chūgoku Expressway
- Maizuru-Wakasa Expressway
- National Route 175
- National Route 427
- National Route 428

== Local attractions ==
- Gaya-in, Buddhist temple with numerous National Treasures and Important Cultural Properties
- Miki Castle ruins, National Historic Site
- Ōmiya Hachiman Shrine

== Sister city relations ==
- Visalia, California, United States
- Federation Council, New South Wales, Australia

== Notable people from Miki ==
- Ide Kuniko (1863–1947), Japanese religious leader who founded a Tenrikyo-derived religious movement
- Yuki Kadono, Japanese snowboarder (Slopestyle)
- Ōtsukasa Nobuhide, former sumo wrestler
- Tsutomu Oosugi, Japanese professional wrestler
- Takashi Shimizu, Japanese professional baseball player (Catcher)
