= Yashirochō Station =

Railway station in Katō, Hyōgo Prefecture, Japan

Yashirochō Station 社町駅
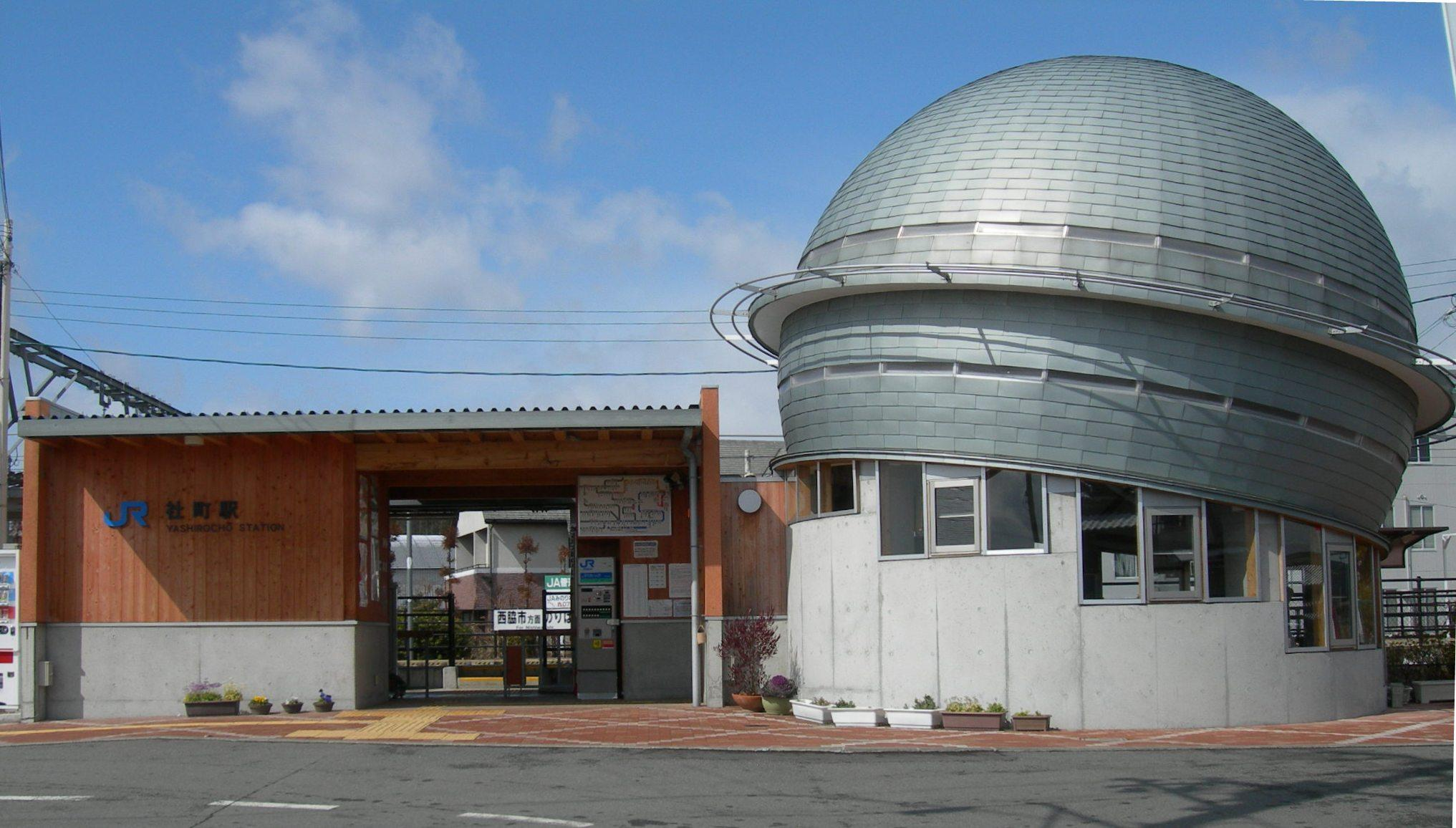
- Yashirochō Station in 2008

General information
- Location: Kotaka-chō, Katō-shi, Hyōgo-ken 679-0221; Japan
- Coordinates: 34.9204°N 134.9343°E
- Operator: JR West
- Line: I Kakogawa Line
- Distance: 24.2 km (15.0 miles) from Kakogawa
- Platforms: 2 side platforms
- Connections: Bus stop

Other information
- Status: Unstaffed
- Website: Official website

History
- Opened: 10 August 1913
- Former names: Yashiroguchi (to 1916): Bantetsu-Yashiroguchi (to 1943)

Passengers
- FY2019: 448 daily

Services
Preceding station	JR West	Following station
Aonogahara towards Kakogawa	Kakogawa Line Local	Takino towards Tanikawa
Location
- Location within Hyōgo Prefecture Location within Japan

Yashirochō Station (社町駅, Yashirochō-eki) is a passenger railway station located in the city of Katō, Hyōgo Prefecture, Japan, operated by West Japan Railway Company (JR West).

== Lines ==
Yashirochō Station is served by the Kakogawa Line and is 24.2 kilometers from the terminus of the line at Kakogawa

== Station layout ==
The station consists of two opposed unnumbered ground-level side platform connected by a level crossing. The station is unattended.

=== Platforms ===
station side	■ Kakogawa Line	for Ao and Kakogawa
opposite side	■ Kakogawa Line	for Nishiwakishi and Tanikawa

== History ==
Yashirochō Station opened on 10 August 1913 as Yashiroguchi Station (社口駅). It was renamed Bantetsu-Yashiroguchi Station (播鉄社駅) on 22 November 1916. When the line was nationalized on 1 June 1943, the name was changed to its present name. With the privatization of the Japan National Railways (JNR) on 1 April 1987, the station came under the aegis of the West Japan Railway Company.

== Passenger statistics ==
In fiscal 2019, the station was used by an average of 448 passengers daily

== Surrounding area ==
- Takino Industrial Park

== See also ==
- List of railway stations in Japan
