= Kawainishi Station =

Railway station in Ono, Hyōgo Prefecture, Japan

Kawainishi Station 河合西駅
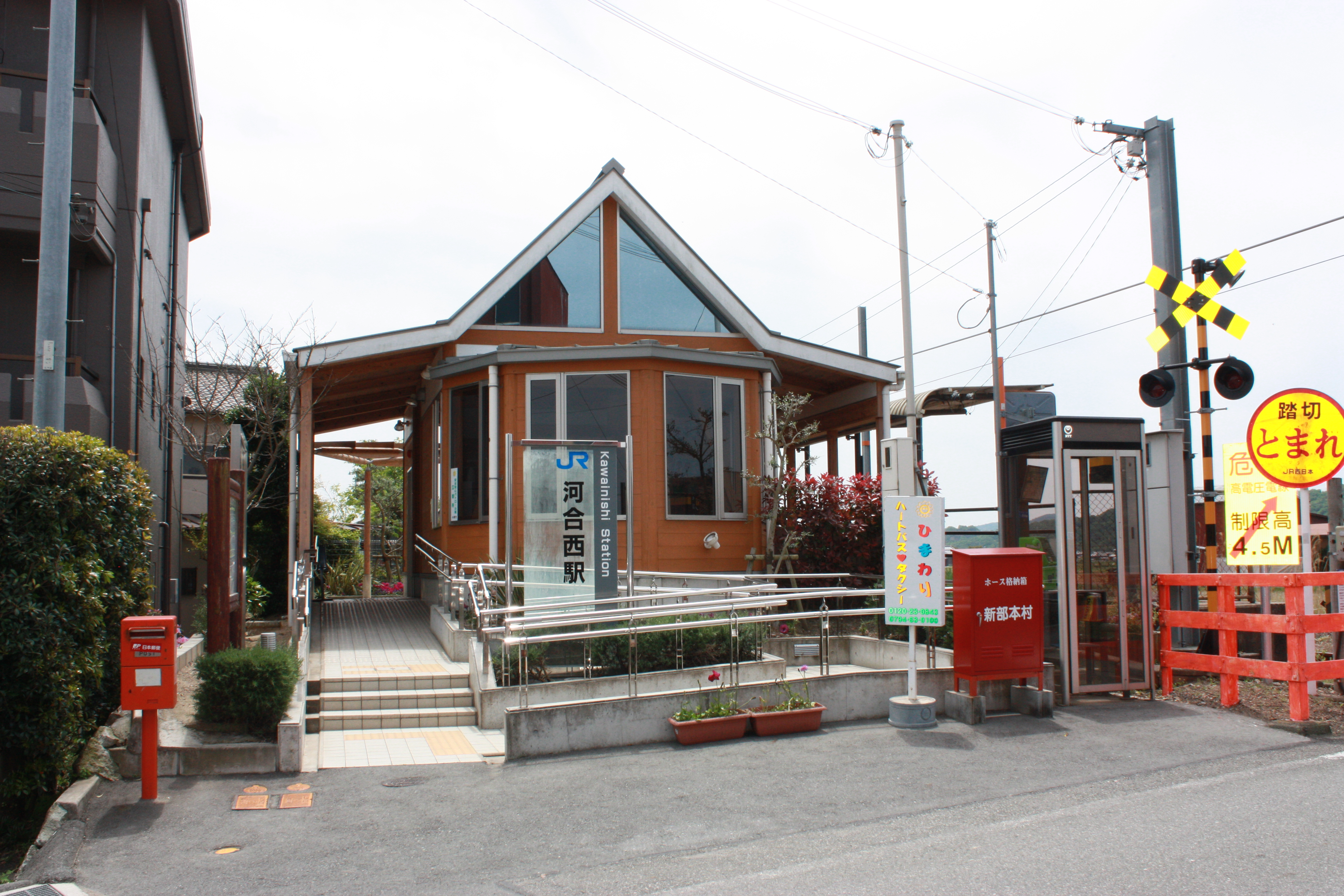
- Kawainishi Station in May 2010

General information
- Location: 645 Kubota, Shinbei-chō, Ono-shi, Hyōgo-ken 675-1355; Japan
- Coordinates: 34.8790°N 134.9195°E
- Operator: JR West
- Line: I Kakogawa Line
- Distance: 19.2 km (11.9 miles) from Kakogawa
- Platforms: 1 side platform
- Connections: Bus stop

Construction
- Structure type: Ground level

Other information
- Status: Unstaffed
- Website: Official website

History
- Opened: 10 August 1913

Passengers
- FY2019: 152 daily

Services
Preceding station	JR West	Following station
Ao towards Kakogawa	Kakogawa Line Local	Aonogahara towards Tanikawa
Location
- Location within Hyōgo Prefecture Location within Japan

Kawainishi Station (河合西駅, Kawainishi-eki) is a passenger railway station located in the city of Ono, Hyōgo Prefecture, Japan, operated by West Japan Railway Company (JR West).

== Lines ==
Kawainishi Station is served by the Kakogawa Line and is 19.2 kilometers from the terminus of the line at Kakogawa

== Station layout ==
The station consists of one ground-level side platform serving a single bi-directional track. The station is unattended.

== History ==
Kawainishi Station opened on 10 August 1913. With the privatization of JNR on 1 April 1987, the station came under the control of JR West.

== Passenger statistics ==
In fiscal 2019, the station was used by an average of 152 passengers daily

== Surrounding area ==
- Ono City Kawai Elementary School
- Ono City Kawai Junior High School

== See also ==
- List of railway stations in Japan
