= Deficit 83 Lines =

Japanese movement to abolish deficit railway lines in 1968

Deficit 83 Lines (赤字83線, Akaji-Hachijyusansen) is a list of railway lines owned by Japanese National Railways (JNR) proposed for abolishment or transferring to third sector companies as it has fulfilled its goals in 1968.

== Criteria ==
The criteria for a railway line being listed are the following:

- The length of the track is under 100 kilometers, and the function seen from the line is small, and there is a small population along the tracks.
- The one-way transportation volume of regular customers is less than 3,000 people, and the daily departure and arrival of cargo is within 600 tons.
- The transportation volume growth is lower than that of competing transportation institutions, and both passengers and cargo are decreasing.

The idea to close lines and replace them with bus services that cost less to operate was formulated as early as 1968.

By these criteria, 83 railway lines of 2,590 km (1,610 mi) in length have been listed, and the JNR began talks with the local municipalities to close the lines. However, due to furious protests from the local residents, out of the 83 lines, before 1972 only 11 of those listed were closed, i.e. 116 km (72 mi).

However, the Japan Railway Construction Public Corporation continued to build local lines, and most of the 11 lines opened during the talks were generating negative income, resulting in no improvements from the closure of the 11 lines.

In 1972, when Kakuei Tanaka became the prime minister, all efforts to close the remaining lines were cancelled. However, most of the lines that continued service after being listed as 83 deficit lines were abolished by Specified local lines movement.

== Aftermath of all 83 lines ==
This table shows the current status of the lines.

=== Lines that were closed as a part of deficit 83 lines movement ===
Name of the line	Prefecture	Sections	Operational Length (km)	Date of abolishment	Notes
Kōbukuro Line	Fukuoka	Kotake - Futase	7.6 km	8 December 1969	After the abolition, Nishitetsu Bus, including the following branch lines, took over, but it was split into Kaho Kotsu (now Nishitetsu Bus Chikuho) on 3 April 1988.
Kōbukuro Line (Cargo branch)	Fukuoka	Kōbukuro - Ikisu	2.5 km	8 December 1969	The 1.6 km section between Kōbukuro and Kawazu signal station is a duplicate section with the main line.
Konpoku Line	Hokkaido	Shari - Koshikawa	12.8 km	1 December 1970	Transferred to Shari bus Koshikawa Line. Bus line abolished 27 April 2004.
Karatsu Line (Kishitake Branch)	Saga	Yamamoto - Kishitake	4.1 km	20 August 1971	Main line continued operations. Line transferred to Showa bus.
Sechibaru Line	Nagasaki	Hizen-Yoshii - Sechibaru	6.7 km	26 December 1971	Turned into a cycling road. Transferred to Saihi Bus Sechibaru Line.
Usunoura Line	Nagasaki	Saza - Usunoura	3.8 km	26 December 1971	Transferred to Saihi bus.
Kajiyabara Line	Tokushima	Itano - Kajiyabara	6.9 km	16 January 1972	JNR bus (later JR Shikoku bus) converted to Awa Line. Abolished on 1 April 1996. Alternative transportation on the former Kajiyahara Line section will be integrated with the competing Tokushima Bus Kajiyahara Line.
Sasanoyama Line	Hyogo	Sasayamaguchi - Fukusumi	17.6 km	1 March 1972	Converted to JNR Bus (later West Japan JR Bus) Sono Shino Line. Converted to Shinki Bus (currently Shinki Green Bus) in 2002.
Mikuni Line	Fukui	Awaraonsen - Awara-Yunomachi	4.5 km	1 March 1972	Transferred to JNR bus Kanazu Mikuni Line. In 1987, it was converted to the Keifuku Bus Kanazu/Tojinbo Line.
Mikuni Line (Partial)	Fukui	Awaraonsen - Mikuni	4.2 km	1 March 1972	Transferred to JNR bus Kanazu Mikuni Line. In 1987, it was converted to the Keifuku Bus Kanazu/Tojinbo Line.
Mikuni Line (Partial)	Fukui	Mikuni - Mikuni-Minato	1.0 km	1 March 1972	Interged into the Keifuku Electric Railroad Mikuni Awara Line (current Echizen Railway Mikuni Awara Line).
Ujina Line	Hiroshima	Hiroshima - Kamiōkō	2.4 km	1 April 1972	Even after the abolition date, it was operated once a day as a JNR side line of the Ujina Four-Party Agreement Line, but it was abolished in 1986.
Kawamata Line	Fukushima	Matsukawa - Iwashiro-Kawamata	12.2 km	14 May 1972	Converted to JNR Bus (later JR Bus Tohoku) Kawamata Line. On March 31, 2005, it was transferred to bus services by the local government.
Sasshō Line (Partial)	Hokkaido	Shin-Totsukawa - Ishikari-Numata	34.9 km	19 June 1972	Transferred to JNR bus (later JR Hokkaido Bus Company) Ishikari Line. Transferred to Hokkaido Chuo Bus; Some sections transferred to bus services by Numata.
Hososhima Line	Miyazaki	Hyūgashi - Hososhima	3.5 km	1 February 1972	Passenger service abolished on the mentioned date. Continued service until December 1, 1993, as a nameless cargo branch of Nippō Main Line.Miyazaki Kōtsu operates a bus line nearby.

=== Lines that continued service after the movement, but were abolished in later movements ===
Name of the Line	Prefecture	Section	Operational length (km)	Date of abolishment	Notes
Kesennuma Line	Miyagi	Minami-Kesennuma - Kesennumakō	1.6 km	1 November 1979	Cargo branch
Kesennuma Line	Miyagi	Kesennuma - Motoyoshi	21.3 km	1 April 2020	Yanaizu - Motoyoshi 34.0 km extension opened December 11, 1977. Incorporated Yanaizu Line, 17.5 km between Maeyachi and Yanaizu. 55.3 km section between Yanaizu and Kesennuma transferred to BRT as a result of Aftermath of the 2011 Tōhoku earthquake and tsunami. Abolished as a railway line on April 1, 2020.
Shiranuka Line	Hokkaido	Shiranuka - Kami-Charo	25.2 km	23 October 1983	Kami-Charo - Hokushin 7.9 km extension opened 8 September 1972. Later listed as specified local lines (1st) and abolished. Transferred to bus service. First line to be abolished under JNR Reconstruction act.
Nicyū Line	Fukushima	Kitakata - Atsushio	11.6 km	1 April 1984	Later listed as specified local lines (1st) and abolished. Transferred to Aizu Bus.
Akatani Line	Niigata	Shibata - Higashi-Akatani	18.9 km	1 April 1984	Later listed as specified local lines (1st) and abolished. Transferred to Niigata Kotsu.
Uonuma Line	Niigata	Raikōji - Nishi-Ojiya	12.6 km	1 April 1984	Later listed as specified local lines (1st) and abolished. Transferred to Echigo Kotsu.
Kuroishi Line	Aomori	Kawabe - Kuroishi	6.6 km	1 November 1984	Later listed as specified local lines (1st) and transferred to Kōnan Railway. Railway line abolished April 1, 1998 and transferred to Kōnan Bus.
Tsuma Line	Miyazaki	Sadowara - Sugiyasu	19.3 km	1 December 1984	Later listed as specified local lines (1st) and transferred to Miyazaki Kotsu.
Miyanoharu Line	Ōita; Kumamoto	Era - Higo-Okuni	26.6 km	1 December 1984	Later listed as specified local lines (1st) and transferred to Oita Transportation Bus. Bus line abolished in 2013 except for some sections.
Komatsushima Line	Tokushima	Chūden - Komatsushima	1.9 km	14 March 1985	Later listed as specified local lines (1st) and abolished. Transferred to Komatsu Bus (Later Tokushima Bus).
Aioi Line	Hokkaido	Bihoro - Kitami-Aioi	36.8 km	1 April 1985	Later listed as specified local lines (1st) and abolished. Transferred to Kitami Bus and Tsubetsu Bus.
Shokotsu Line	Hokkaido	Shokotsu - Kitami-Takinoue	34.3 km	1 April 1985	Later listed as specified local lines (1st) and abolished. Transferred to Hokumon Bus.
Yahiko Line (Partial)	Niigata	Higashi-Sanjō - Echigō-Nagasawa	7.9 km	1 April 1985	Transferred to Echigo Kotsu.
Hōjō Line	Hyogo	Ao - Hōjōmachi	13.8 km	1 April 1985	Later listed as specified local lines (1st) and transferred to Hōjō Railways.
Miki Line	Hyogo	Yakujin - Miki	6.8 km	1 April 1985	Later Listed as specified local lines (1st) and transferred to Miki Railway Miki Line. Railway line abolished 1 April 2008 and transferred to Shinki Bus.
Kurayoshi Line	Tottori	Kurayoshi - Yamamori	20.0 km	1 April 1985	Later listed as specified local lines (1st) and abolished. Converted to Nippon Kotsu/Hinomaru Motor Bus/Chutetsu Bus (currently Chutetsu Mimasaka Bus).
Katsuki Line	Fukuoka	Nakama - Katsuki	3.5 km	1 April 1985	Later listed as specified local lines (1st) and abolished. Converted to Nishitetsu Bus (currently Nishitetsu Bus Kitakyushu).
Katsuta Line	Fukuoka	Yoshizuka - Chikuzen-Katsuta	13.8 km	1 April 1985	Later listed as specified local lines (1st) and abolished. Transferred to Nishitetsu Bus.
Soeda Line	Fukuoka	Kawara - Soeda	12.1 km	1 April 1985	Later listed as specified local lines (1st) and abolished. Transferred to Seitetsu Bus Chikuho.
Muroki Line	Fukuoka	Ongagawa - Muroki	11.2 km	1 April 1985	Later listed as specified local lines (1st) and abolished, transferred to Nishitetsu Bus. Bus service abolished 1996.
Yabe Line	Fukuoka	Hainuzuka - Kuroki	19.7 km	1 April 1985	Later listed as specified local lines (1st) and abolished. Transferred to Horikawa Bus.
Iwanai Line	Hokkaido	Kozawa - Iwanai	14.9 km	1 July 1985	Later listed as specified local lines (1st) and abolished. Transferred to Nisseki Bus.
Kōhin-Hoku Line	Hokkaido	Hama-Tombetsu - Kitami-Esashi	30.4 km	1 July 1985	Later listed as specified local lines (1st) and abolished. Transferred to Soya Bus.
Ōhata Line	Aomori	Shimokita - Ōhata	18.0 km	1 July 1985	Later listed as specified local lines (1st) and transferred to Shimokita Kotsu Ōhata Line. Railway Line abolished on April 1, 2001. Transferred to Shimokita Bus.
Kōhin-nan Line	Hokkaido	Okoppe - Omu	19.9 km	15 July 1985	Later listed as specified local lines (1st) and abolished. Transferred to Hokumon Bus.
Bikō Line	Hokkaido	Bifuka - Niupu	21.2 km	17 September 1985	Later listed as specified local lines (1st) and abolished. Transferred to Meishi Bus.
Yashima Line	Akita	Ugo-Honjō - Ugo-Yashima	23.0 km	1 October 1985	Later listed as specified local lines (1st) and transferred to Yuri Kōgen Railway Chōkai Sanroku Line.
Akechi Line	Gifu	Ena - Akechi	25.2 km	16 November 1985	Later listed as specified local lines (1st) and transferred to Akechi Railroad Akechi Line.
Uchiko Line (Partial)	Ehime	Gorō - Niiya	5.0 km	3 March 1986	Rest of the line continues operation as listed below.
Takamori Line	Kumamoto	Tateno - Takamori	17.7 km	1 April 1986	Later listed as specified local lines (2nd) and transferred to Minamiaso Railway Takamori Line.
Tominai Line	Hokkaido	Mukawa - Hidakachō	83.0 km	1 November 1986	Later listed as specified local lines (2nd) and abolished. Transferred to Donan Bus.
Aniai Line	Akita	Takanosu - Hitachinai	46.1 km	1 November 1986	Later listed as specified local lines (2nd) and transferred to Akita Nairiku Railways Akita Nairiku North Line. 29.0 km extension between Hitachinai - Matsuba opened 1 April 1989. Incorporated Akita Nairiku South Line and renamed to Akita Nairiku Line on the same date.
Etsumi-Nan Line	Gifu	Mino-Ōta - Hokunō	72.2 km	11 December 1986	Later listed as specified local lines (2nd) and transferred to Nagaragawa Railway Etsumi-Nan Line.
Miyanojyō Line	Kagoshima	Sendai - Satsuma-Ōkuchi	66.1 km	10 January 1987	Later listed as specified local lines (2nd) and abolished. Transferred to Nangoku Kotsu Bus.
Furue Line	Kagoshima	Shibushi - Kaigata	64.8 km	14 March 1987	33.5 km extension between Kaigataonsen - Kokubu opened 9 September 1972. Renamed to Ōsumi Line. Later listed as specified local lines (2nd) and abolished. Transferred to JR Kyushu bus and Kagoshima Kotsu Bus. (JR Kyushu Bus ended service later)
Senata Line	Hokkaido	Kunnui - Senata	48.4 km	16 March 1987	Later listed as specified local lines (2nd) and abolished. Transferred to Hakodate Bus.
Yūmō Line	Hokkaido	Naka-Yūbetsu - Abashiri	89.8 km	20 March 1987	Later listed as specified local lines (2nd) and abolished. Transferred to Abashiri Bus. Abashiri bus abandoned sections between Naka-Yūbetsu and Tokoro on 1 October 2010. (Some sections continues operations by local municipalities)
Saga Line	Saga; Fukuoka	Saga - Setaka	24.1 km	28 March 1987	Later listed as specified local lines (2nd) and abolished. Transferred to Seitetsu Bus, Saga City Bus and Horikawa Bus.(Saga City Bus route abandoned 1998)
Shigaraki Line	Shiga	Kibukawa - Shigaraki	14.8 km	13 July 1987	Later listed as specified local lines (1st) and transferred to Shigaraki Kohgen Railway.
Aizu Line (Partial)	Fukushima	Nishi-Wakamatsu - Aizukōgen-Ozeguchi	57.4 km	16 July 1987	Later listed as specified local lines (2nd) and transferred to Aizu Railway Aizu Line.
Gannichi Line	Yamaguchi	Kawanishi - Nishikichō	32.7 km	25 July 1987	Later listed as specified local lines (2nd) and transferred to Nishikigawa Seiryū Line.
Wakasa Line	Tottori	Kōge - Wakasa	19.2 km	14 October 1987	Later listed as specified local lines (1st) and transferred to Wakasa Railway Wakasa Line.
Yamano Line	Kumamoto; Kagoshima	Minamata - Kurino	55.7 km	1 February 1988	Later listed as specified local lines (2nd) and abolished. Transferred to Nangoku Kotsu Bus.
Kihara Line	Chiba	Ōhara - Kazusa-Nakano	26.9 km	24 March 1988	Later listed as specified local lines (1st) and transferred to Isumi Railways Isumi Line.
Noto Line	Ishikawa	Anamizu - Takojima	61.1 km	25 March 1988	Later listed as specified local lines (3rd) and transferred to Noto Railway. Railway line abolished on 1 April 2005. Transferred to Hokutetsu Okunoto Bus.
Nakamura Line	Kochi	Kubokawa - Tosa-Saga	20.7 km	1 April 1988	22.7 km extension between Tosa-Saga - Nakamura opened 1 October 1970. Later listed as specified local lines (3rd) and transferred to Tosa Kuroshio Railway Nakamura Line.
Mooka Line	Ibaraki; Tochigi	Shimodate - Motegi	42.0 km	11 April 1988	Later listed as specified local lines (2nd) and transferred to Mooka Railways Mooka Line.
Nagai Line	Yamagata	Akayu - Arato	30.6 km	25 October 1988	Later listed as specified local lines (3rd) and transferred to Yamagata Railways Flower Nagai Line.
Hinokage Line	Miyazaki	Nobeoka - Hinokage	37.6 km	28 April 1989	12.5 km extension between Hinokage - Takachiho opened 22 July 1972. Renamed to Takachiho Line. Later listed as specified local lines (2nd) and transferred to Takachiho Railway Takachiho Line. Suspended operations on 6 September 2005, due to a typhoon and abolished 28 December 2008. Transferred to Miyazaki Kotsu Bus.
Shibetsu Line	Hokkaido	Shibecha - Nemuro-Shibetsu	69.4 km	30 April 1989	Later listed as specified local lines (2nd) and abolished. Transferred to Akan Bus.
Shibetsu Line	Hokkaido	Nakashibetsu - Attoko	47.5 km	30 April 1989	Later listed as specified local lines (2nd) and abolished. Transferred to Nemuro Kotsu Bus.
Yunomae Line	Kumamoto	Hitoyoshi - Yunomae	24.9 km	1 October 1989	Later listed as specified local lines (3rd) and transferred to Kumagawa Railway Yunomae Line.
Kajiya Line	Hyogo	Nomura - Kajiya	13.2 km	1 April 1990	Later listed as specified local lines (3rd) and abolished. Transferred to Shinkai Bus.
Taisha Line	Shimane	Izumoshi - Taisha	7.5 km	1 April 1990	Later listed as specified local lines (3rd) and abolished. Transferred to Ichibata Bus.
Shinmei Line	Hokkaido	Fukagawa - Nayoro	121.8 km	4 September 1995	Transferred to JR Hokkaido Bus.
Kabe Line (Partial)	Hiroshima	Kabe - Kake	32.0 km	1 December 2003	14.2 km extension between Kake - Sandankyō opened 27 July 1969. 46.2 km unelectrified section between Kabe - Sandankyō abolished 1 December 2003. Transferred to Hiroshima Katsu Bus and Hiroden Bus. Section between Kabe - Aki-Kameyama reopened and electrified 4 March 2017.
Iwaizumi Line	Iwate	Moichi - Asanai	31.2 km	1 April 2014	7.4 extension between Asanai - Iwaizumi opened 6 February 1972. Renamed to Iwaizumi Line. Later listed as specified local lines (2nd) but unlisted due to lack of replacement roads. Continued operations until 31 July 2010, due to a natural disaster. Abolished on 1 April 2014, and transferred to East Japan Kotsu Bus.
Esashi Line	Hokkaido	Kikonai - Esashi	42.1 km	12 May 2014	Abolished before the opening of Hokkaido Shinkansen. Transferred to Hakodate Bus.
Esashi Line	Hokkaido	Kikonai - Goryōkaku	37.8 km	26 March 2016	Transferred to South Hokkaido Railway Company before the opening of Hokkaido Shinkansen.
Sankō-Hoku Line	Shimane	Gōtsu - Hamahara	50.1 km	1 April 2018	26.9 km extension between Hamahara - Kuchiba opened 31 August 1975. Incorporated Sankō-Minami Line and renamed to Sankō Line on the same date. Continued operations as a part of Sankō Line, but abolished 1 April 2018. Transferred to Yamato Kanko Bus.
Sankō-Minami Line	Hiroshima; Shimane	Miyoshi - Kuchiba	28.4 km	1 April 2018	Incorporated into Sankō-Hoku Line on 31 August 1975. Continued operations as a part of Sankō Line, but was abolished on 1 April 2018. Transferred to several bus services.

=== Lines that continue service ===
Name of the line	Prefecture	Section	Operational length (km)	Notes
Hachinohe Line (Partial)	Aomori	Same - Kuji	53.1 km	After the opening of Tohoku Shinkansen, the line is isolated from other JR lines.
Ōminato Line	Aomori	Noheji - Ōminato	58.4 km	Similar as above, but the line does not connect to the Tohoku Shinkansen unlike Hachinohe Line.
Aizu Line (Partial)	Fukushima	Aizu-Miyashita - Tadami	43.0 km	Continues operations as a part of Tadami Line.
Tadami Line	Niigata	Koide - Ōshirakawa	26.0 km	20.8 km extension between Tadami - Ōshirakawa opened 29 August 1971. Incorporated the section Aizu-Wakamatsu - Tadami of Aizu Line on the same date.
Karasuyama Line	Tochigi	Hōshakuji - Karasuyama	20.4 km	
Etsumi-Hoku Line	Fukui	Minami-Fukui - Kadohara	43.1 km	10.2 km extension between Kadohara and Kuzuryūko opened 15 December 1972. Changed starting point of the line to Echizen-Hanandō on 1 April 1987.
Meishō Line	Mie	Matsusaka - Ise-Okitsu	43.5 km	Listed for specified local lines (2nd) but were unlisted due to lack of roads to replace it. Section between Ieki - Ise-Okitsu suspended operations due to typhoon in 2009, but resumed service in 2016.
Sangū Line (Partial)	Mie	Iseshi - Toba	14.1 km	
Uwajima Line	Kochi Ehime	Kita-Uwajima - Ekawasaki	33.6 km	42.7 km extension between Ekawasaki - Wakai opened 1 March 1974. Renamed into Yodo Line and continues operation as it.
Naruto Line	Tokushima	Ikenotani - Naruto	8.3 km	
Mugi Line (partial)	Tokushima	Anan - Mugi	43.3 km	11.6 km extension between Mugi and Kaifu opened 1 October 1973. 1.5 km section between Awa-Kainan abolished and transferred to Asa Coast Railway Company on 1 November 2020.
Uchiko Line (Partial)	Ehime	Niiya - Uchiko	5.3 km	On 3 March 1986, the extension of the Yosan Main Line between Mukaihara and Uchiko and Shintani and Iyo-Ozu was incorporated into the short-circuit route, and other 4.1 km between Kitayama and Uchiko (Shin-Uchiko) was changed to a new route. Gōrō Station was abolished from Uchiko Line as a result. (Station remains as a station belonging to Yosan Line)
Kashii Line (Partial)	Fukuoka	Kashii - Umi	14.1 km	
Ibusuki Makurazaki Line (Partial)	Kagoshima	Yamakawa - Makurazaki	37.9 km	
Nichinan Line	Miyazaki Kagoshima	Minami-Miyazaki - Shibushi	89.0 km	

== See also ==
- Specified local lines
- Beeching cuts
