= Nihon-heso-kōen Station =

Railway station in Nishiwaki, Hyōgo Prefecture, Japan

Nihon-heso-kōen Station 日本へそ公園駅
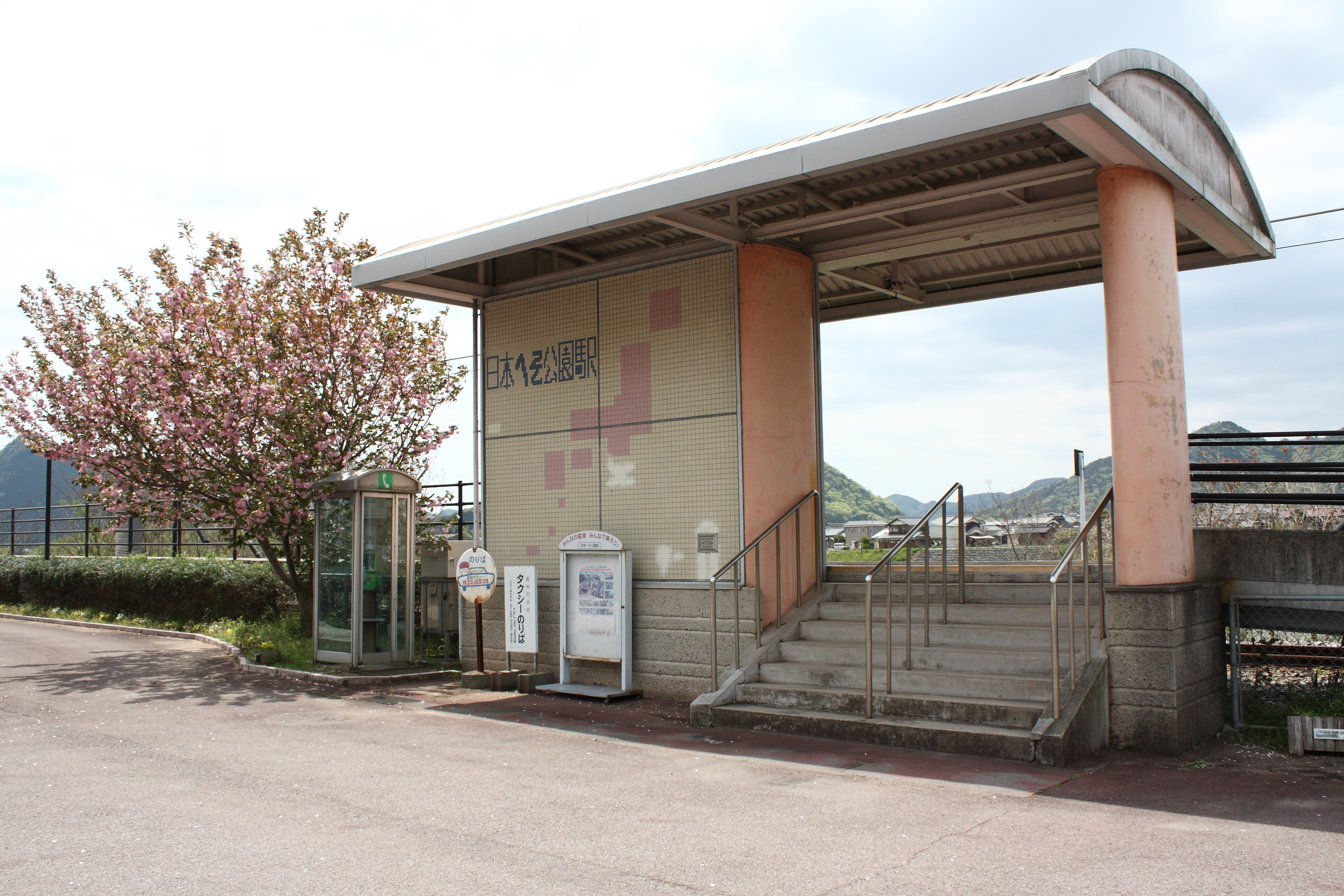
- Nihon-heso-kōen Station in April 2017

General information
- Location: Kamihie-chō, Nishiwaki-shi, Hyōgo-ken 677-0039; Japan
- Coordinates: 35.0021°N 134.9977°E
- Operator: JR West
- Line: I Kakogawa Line
- Distance: 36.1 km (22.4 miles) from Kakogawa
- Platforms: 1 side platform
- Connections: Bus stop

Other information
- Status: Unstaffed
- Website: Official website

History
- Opened: 4 May 1985

Passengers
- FY2019: 8 daily

Services
Preceding station	JR West	Following station
Hie towards Kakogawa	Kakogawa Line Local	Kurodasho towards Tanikawa
Location
- Location within Hyōgo Prefecture Location within Japan

Nihon-heso-kōen Station (日本へそ公園駅, Nihon-heso-kōen-eki) is a passenger railway station located in the city of Nishiwaki, Hyōgo Prefecture, Japan, operated by West Japan Railway Company (JR West).

== Lines ==
Nihon-heso-kōen Station is served by the Kakogawa Line and is 36.1 kilometers from the terminus of the line at Kakogawa

== Station layout ==
The station consists of one ground-level side platform serving bi-directional track. The station is unattended.

== History ==
Nihon-heso-kōen Station opened on 4 May 1985. With the privatization of the Japan National Railways (JNR) on 1 April 1987, the station came under the aegis of the West Japan Railway Company.

== Passenger statistics ==
In fiscal 2019, the station was used by an average of 8 passengers daily

== Surrounding area ==
- Nishiwaki Latitude and Geoscience Museum
- Okanoyama Art Museum
- Sairin-ji temple

== See also ==
- List of railway stations in Japan
