= 125 series =

Japanese single-car DC electric multiple unit train type

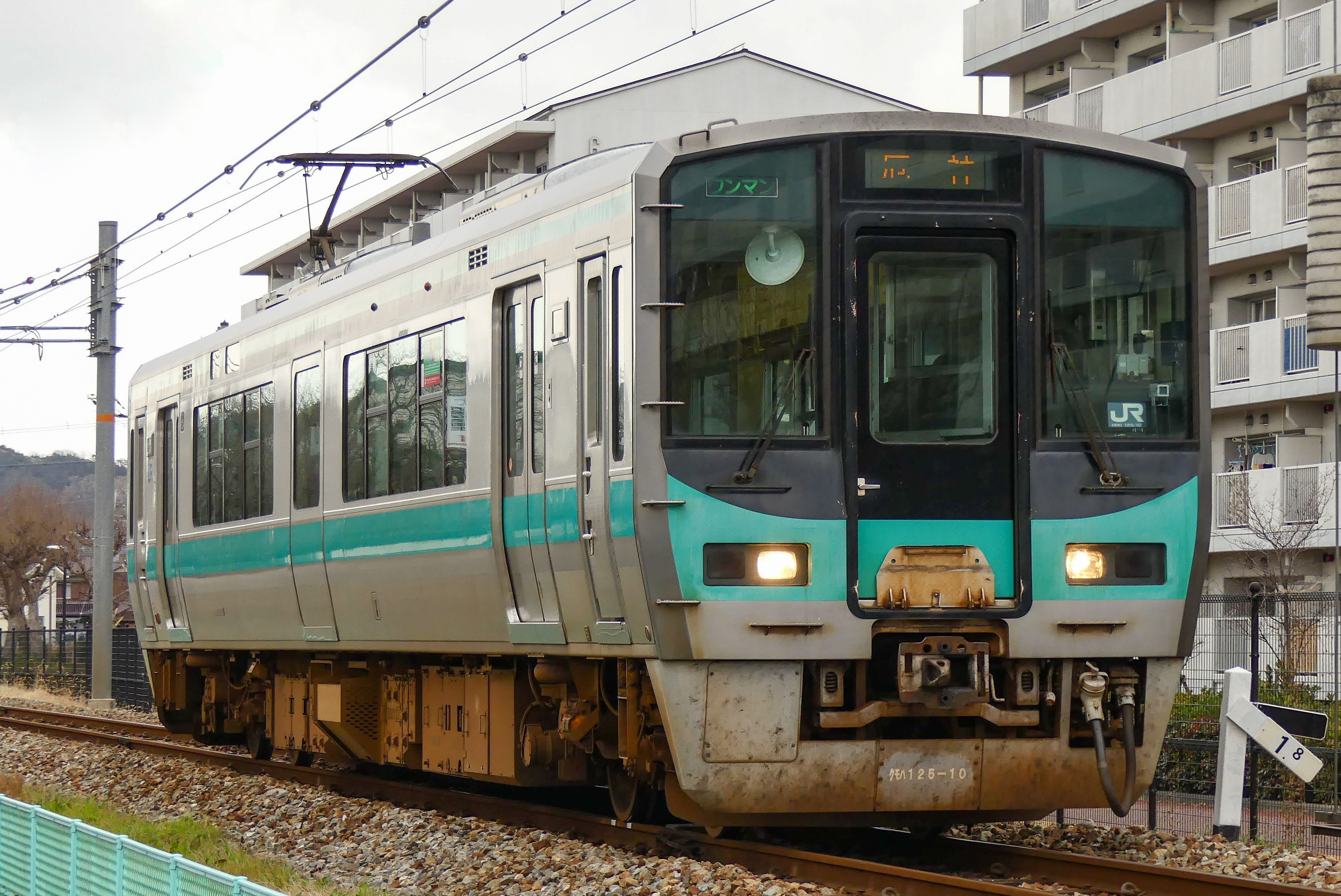
- Kakogawa Line KuMoHa 125-10 in January 2019
- Manufacturer: Kawasaki Heavy Industries
- Built at: Hyogo
- Replaced: KiHa 40, KiHa 47, KiHa 58
- Constructed: 2002–2006
- Entered service: 15 March 2003
- Number built: 18 cars
- Number in service: 18 cars
- Formation: Single car unit
- Fleet numbers: F1–8, F13–18, N1–4
- Capacity: 117
- Operator: JR-West
- Depots: Tsuruga, Aboshi
- Lines served: Obama Line; L Maizuru Line; I Kakogawa Line

Specifications
- Car body construction: Stainless steel
- Car length: 20,340 mm (66 ft 9 in)
- Width: 2,950 mm (9 ft 8 in)
- Height: 4,095 mm (13 ft 5.2 in)
- Doors: 2 pairs per side
- Maximum speed: 120 km/h (75 mph)
- Traction system: Variable frequency (2-level IGBT)
- Power output: 440 kW (590 hp)
- Electric systems: 1,500 V DC (overhead line)
- Current collection: WPS28A single-arm pantograph
- Bogies: WDT59A (motored), WTR243B (trailer)
- Safety system: ATS-P
- Track gauge: 1,067 mm (3 ft 6 in)

The 125 series (125系, 125-kei) is a single-car DC electric multiple unit (EMU) train type operated by West Japan Railway Company (JR-West) on local services in Japan since March 2003.

== Design ==
The 125 series design is based on the 223-2000 series EMU design, with stainless bodies and steel front ends.

The cars have two pairs of sliding doors on each side, with provision for a third set of doors in the centre.

The second-batch cars (KuMoHa 125-9–12) delivered in 2003 differ from the earlier batch by having enlarged front-end skirts and darker grey tinted windows.

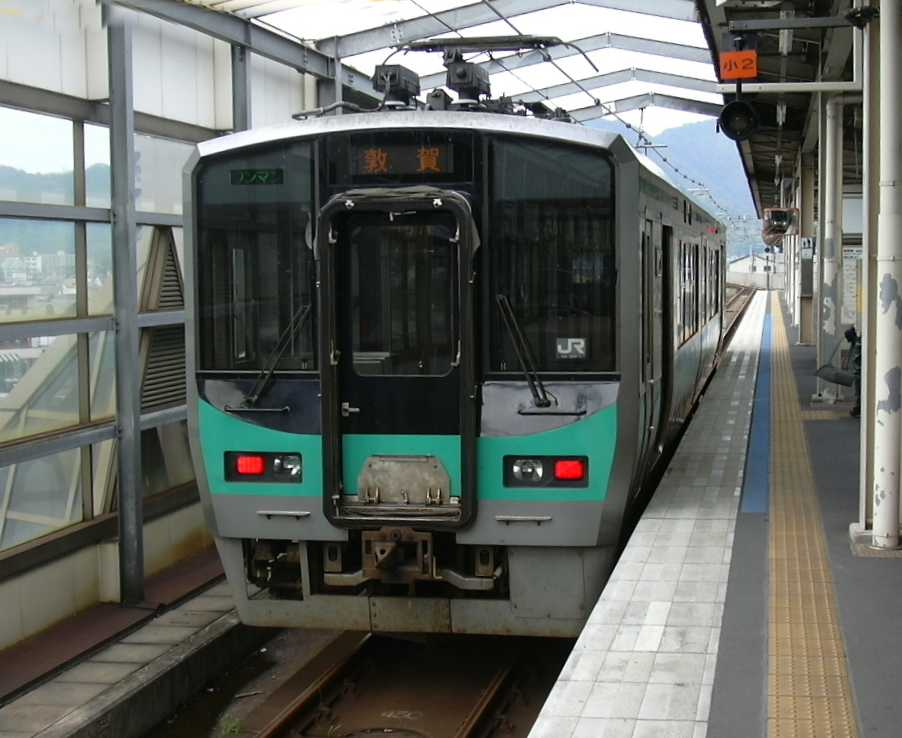
125 series first-batch car, June 2004

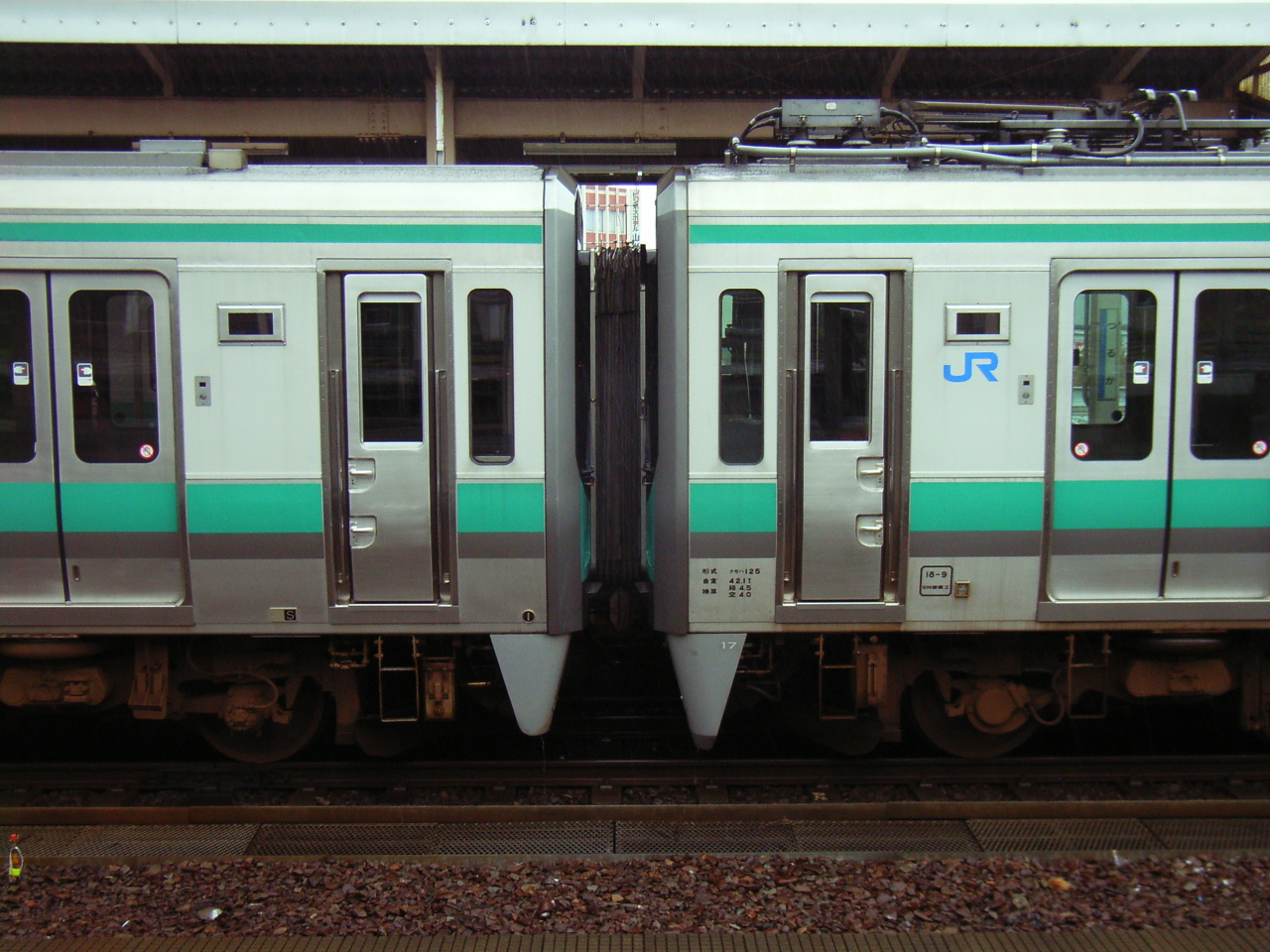
125 series first-batch (left) and third-batch (right) cars coupled together, showing the difference in front-end skirt lengths and window tint

== Operations ==
The 125 series is used on wanman driver-only operation services, primarily on the Obama Line and Kakogawa Line.

Up to five single cars can be operated together as a multiple car set.

== Formation ==
Designation	cMc
Numbering	KuMoHa 125
Capacity (Seated/standing)	31/86
Weight	40.5 t

Cars KuMoHa 125-7/8/11/12 are equipped with a second de-icing pantograph.

== Interior ==
Passenger accommodation consists of longitudinal bench seating at the ends, and 2+2 abreast transverse reversible seating in the centre of the cars. The first two batches of cars (KuMoHa 125-1–12) were delivered with 1+2 abreast seating, but this was increased to 2+2 seating during 2003 and 2004.

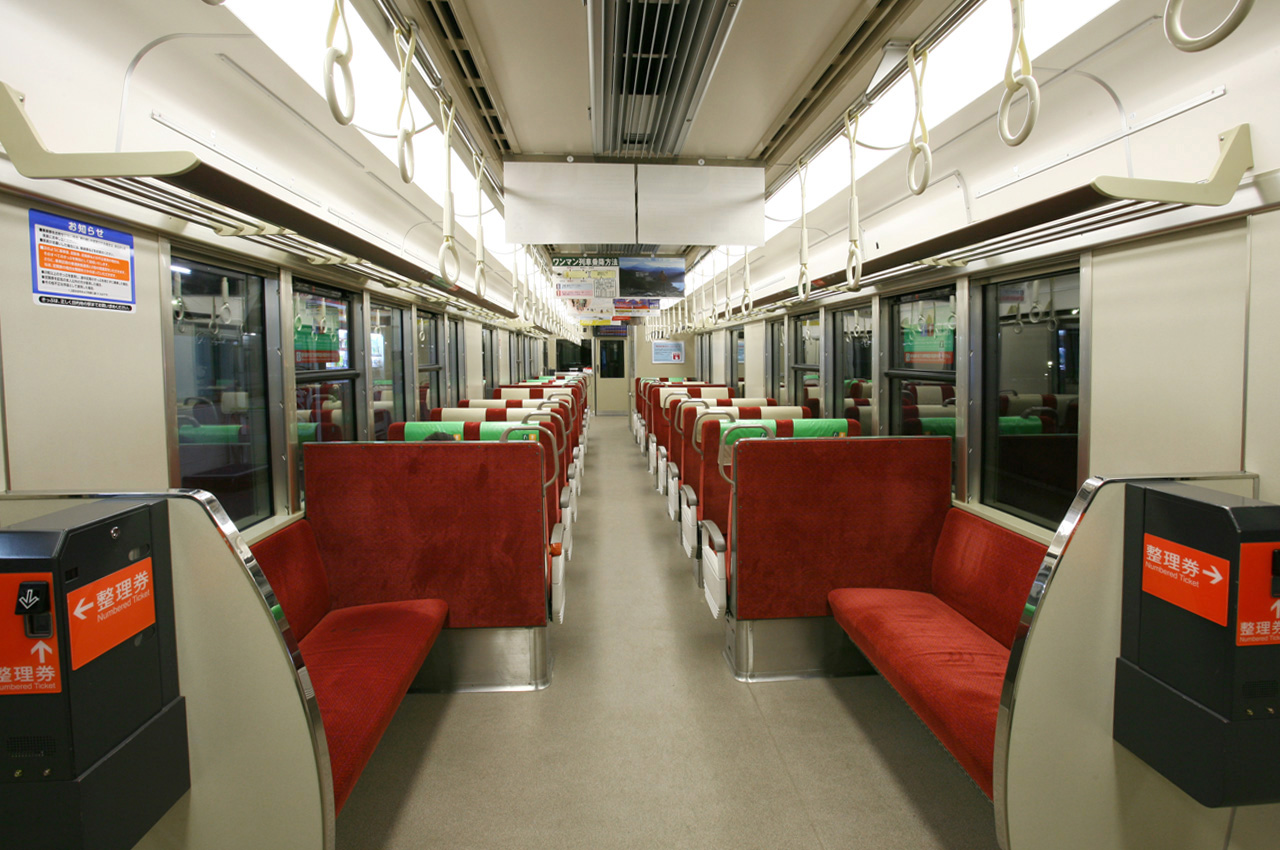
General view of interior (KuMoHa 125-16, April 2008)

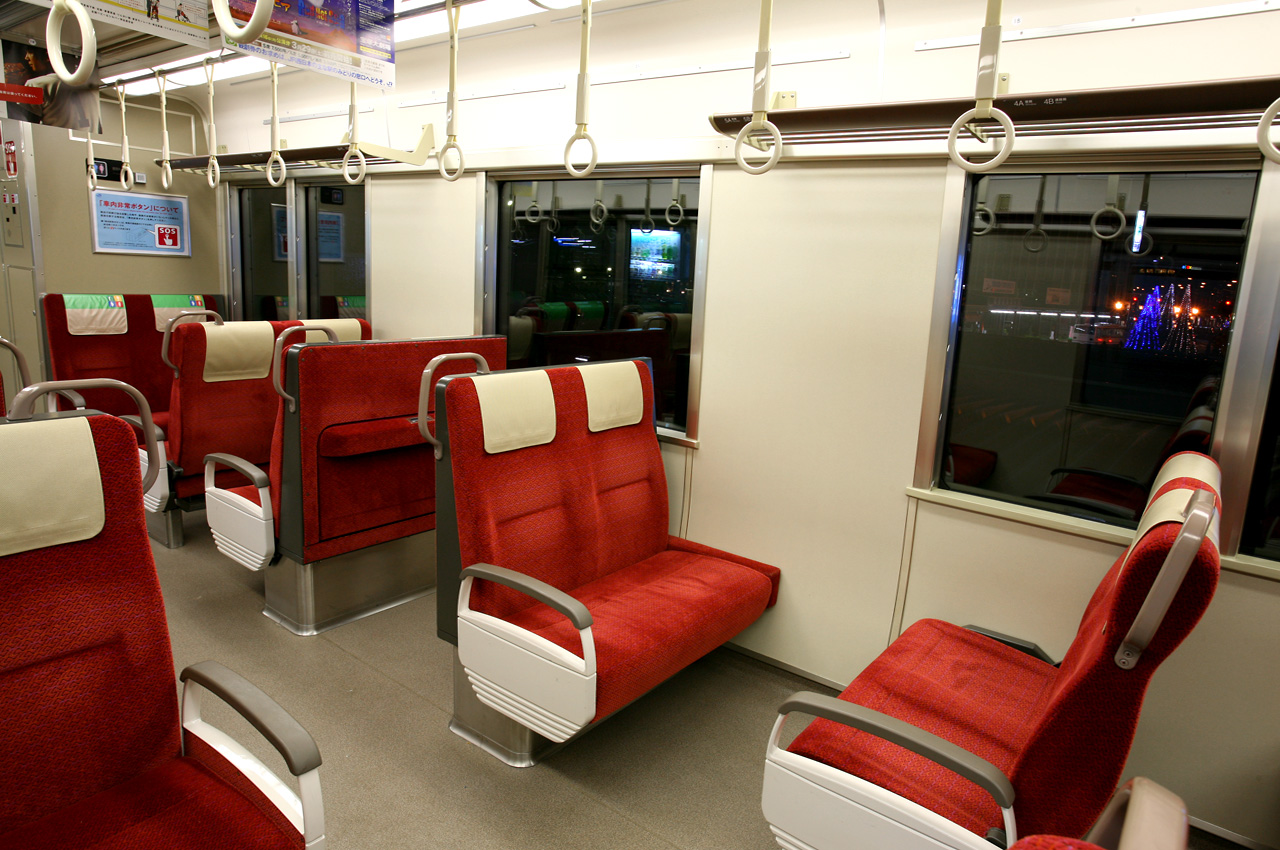
Reversible seating (KuMoHa 125-16, April 2008)

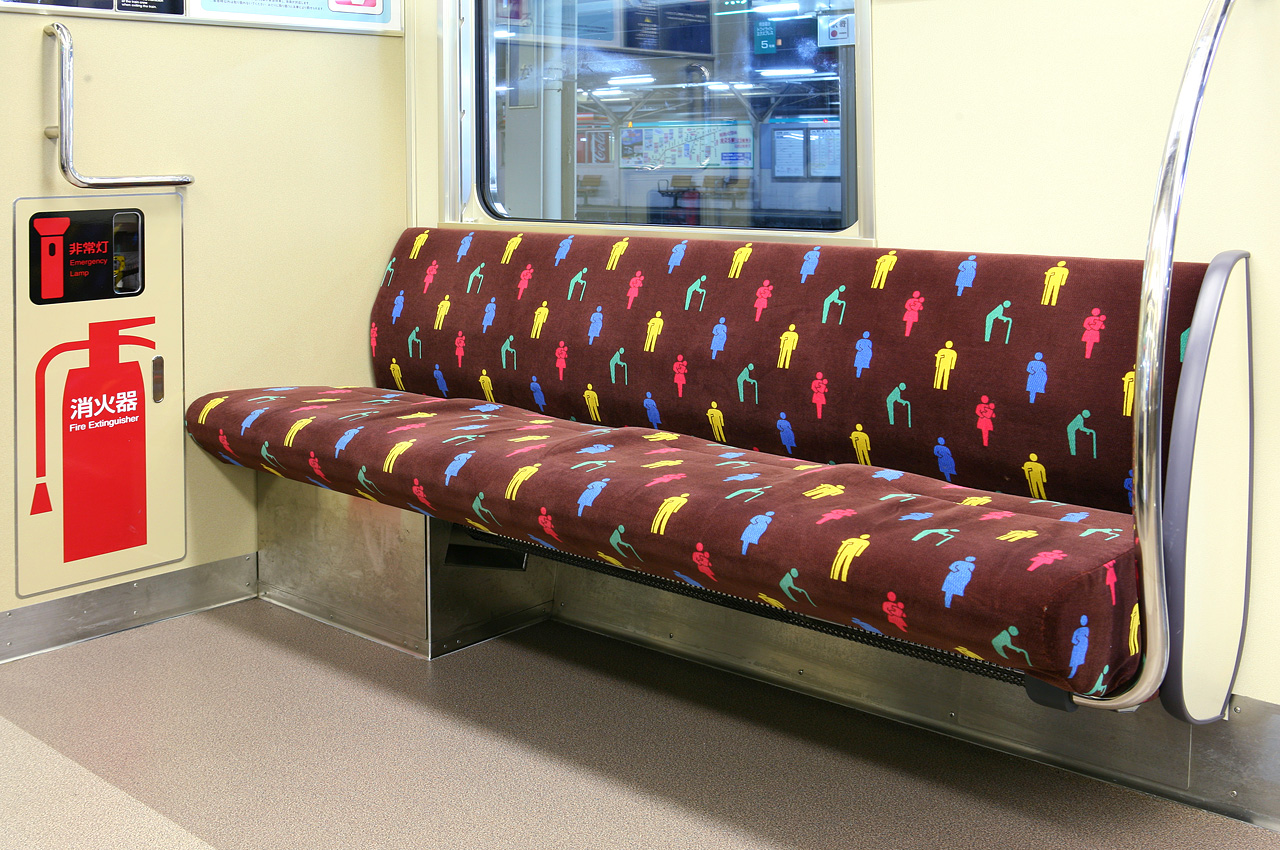
Priority seating (KuMoHa 125-16, April 2008)

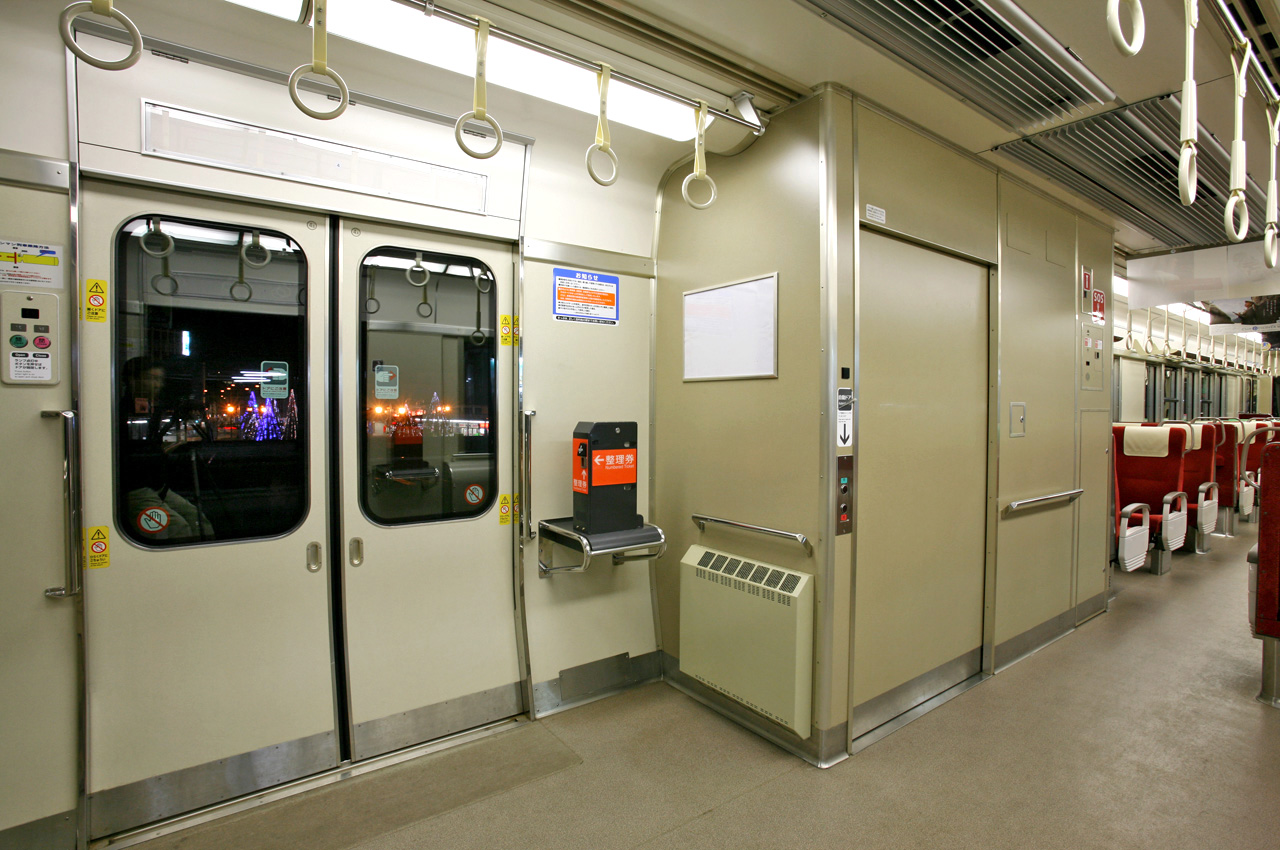
Doorway and toilet (KuMoHa 125-16, April 2008)

== History ==
The first eight cars (KuMoHa 125-1–8) were built by Kawasaki Heavy Industries in December 2002 for entry into service from 15 March 2003 on the then-newly electrified 84.3-kilometre (52.4 mi) Obama Line between Tsuruga and Higashi-Maizuru. These sets were initially allocated to Fukuchiyama Depot, but were subsequently transferred to Tsuruga Depot.

Four more cars (KuMoHa 125-9–12) were built in September 2004 for entry into service from 19 December 2004 on the newly electrified 48.5 km (30.1 mi) Kakogawa Line between Kakogawa and Tanikawa.

A further six cars (KuMoHa 125-13–18) were built in September 2006 to coincide with the conversion of Tsuruga area services from 20 kV AC to 1,500 V DC electrification from 21 October 2006.

From the start of the revised timetable on 18 March 2023, 125 series trainsets began operation on the Maizuru Line.
