= Kurodashō Station =

Railway station in Nishiwaki, Hyōgo Prefecture, Japan

Kurodashō Station 黒田庄駅
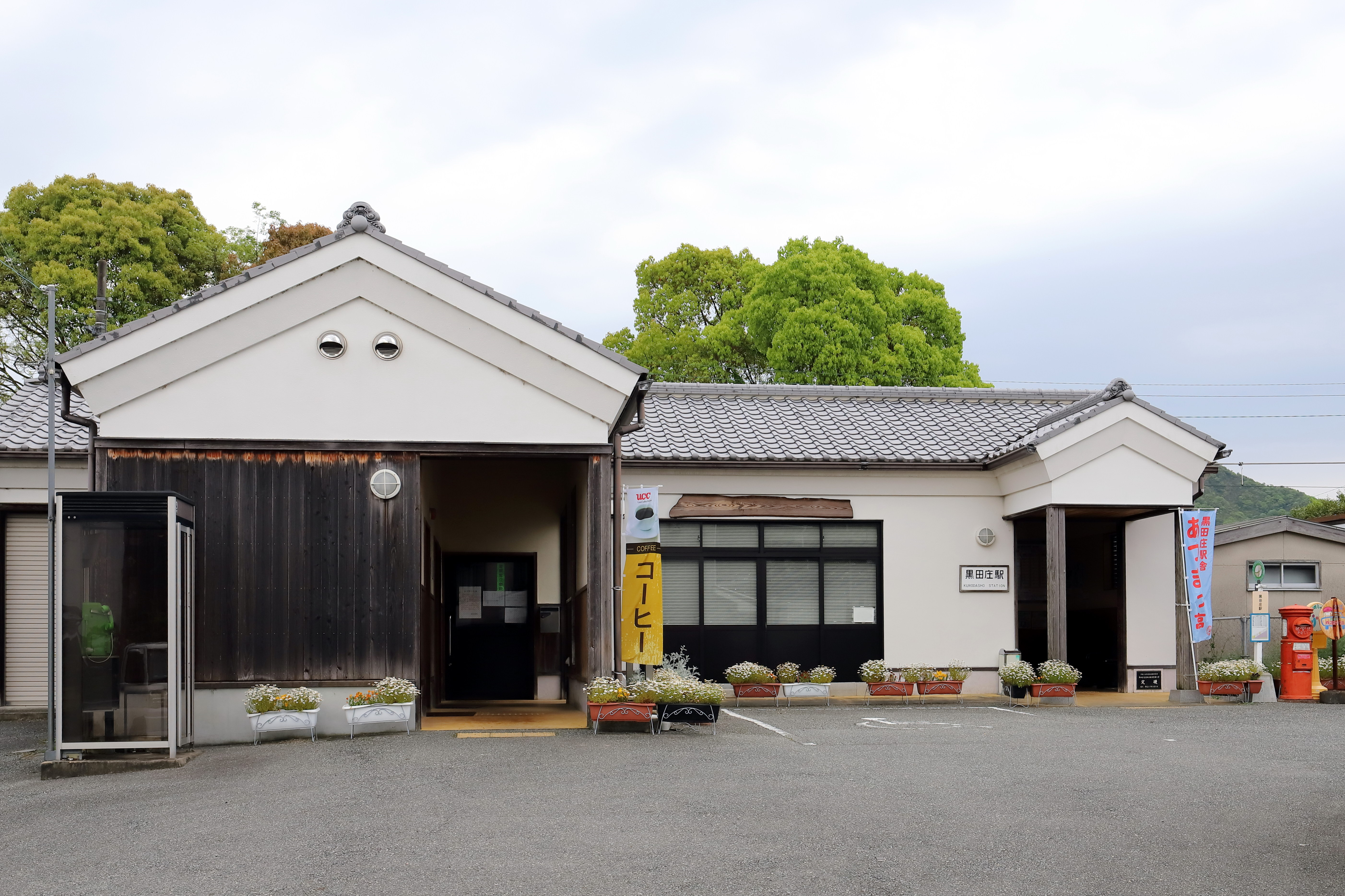
- Kurodashō Station in May 2020

General information
- Location: 643 Machioka Kurodashō, Nishiwaki-shi, Hyōgo-ken 679-0313; Japan
- Coordinates: 35.0229°N 134.9927°E
- Operator: JR West
- Line: I Kakogawa Line
- Distance: 38.5 km (23.9 miles) from Kakogawa
- Platforms: 1 side platform
- Connections: Bus stop

Construction
- Structure type: Ground level

Other information
- Status: Unstaffed
- Website: Official website

History
- Opened: 27 December 1924

Passengers
- FY2019: 32 daily

Services
Preceding station	JR West	Following station
Nihon-heso-kōen towards Kakogawa	Kakogawa Line Local	Hon-Kuroda towards Tanikawa
Location
- Location within Hyōgo Prefecture Location within Japan

Kurodashō Station (黒田庄駅, Kurodashō-eki) is a passenger railway station located in the city of Nishiwaki, Hyōgo Prefecture, Japan, operated by West Japan Railway Company (JR West).

== Lines ==
Kurodashō Station is served by the Kakogawa Line and is 38.5 kilometers from the terminus of the line at Kakogawa.

== Station layout ==
The station consists of one ground-level side platform serving bi-directional track. The station is unattended. The station formerly had two opposed side platforms, but one of these platforms is not in use.

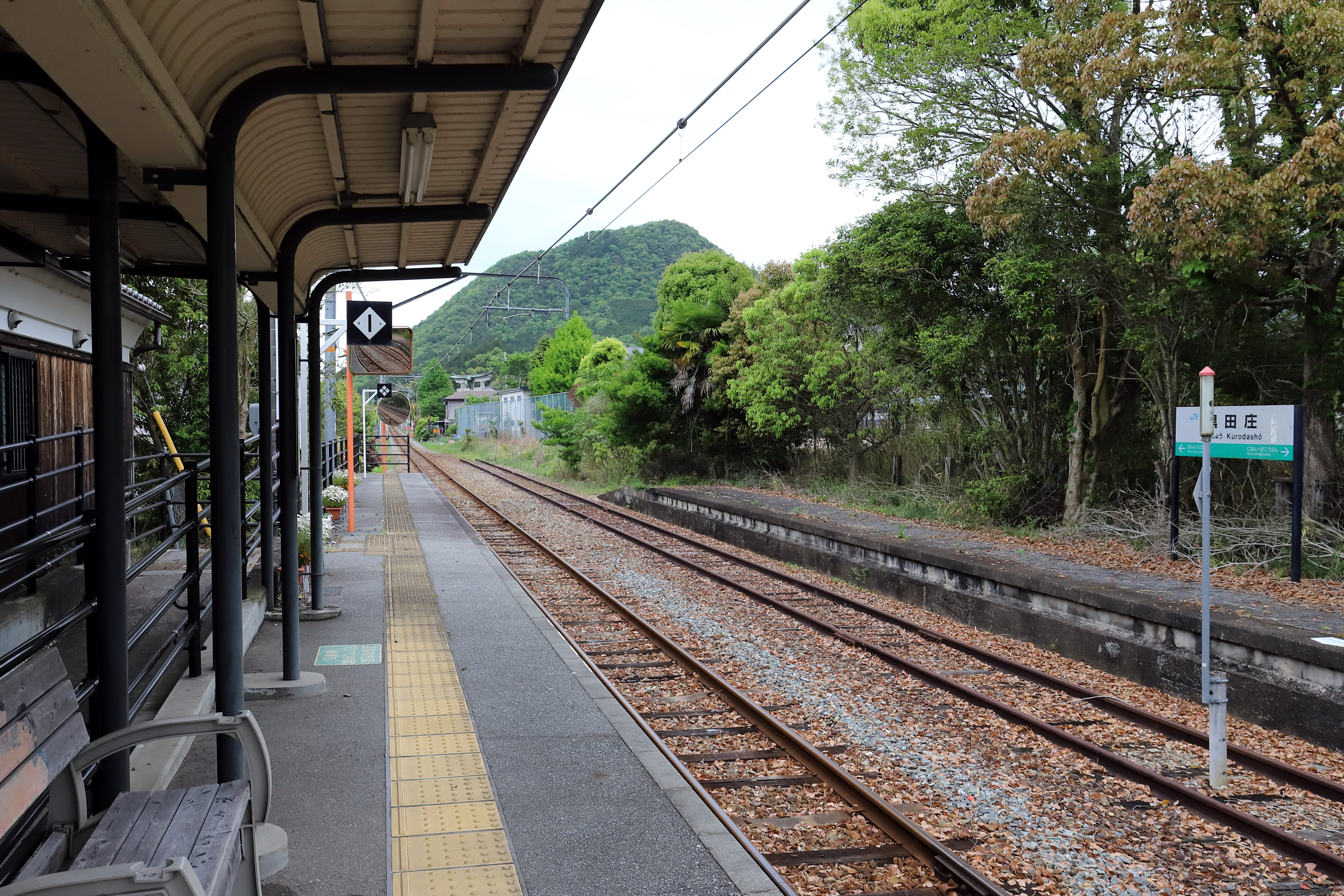
Platform

== History ==
Kurodashō Station opened on 27 December 1924. With the privatization of the Japan National Railways (JNR) on 1 April 1987, the station came under the aegis of the West Japan Railway Company. The current station building was completed in 2005.

== Passenger statistics ==
In fiscal 2019, the station was used by an average of 32 passengers daily.

== Surrounding area ==
- Kurodashō Fire Department
- Gokurakuji Temple
- Kusugaoka Elementary School

== See also ==
- List of railway stations in Japan
