= Yamausu Temporary Boarding Point =

Railway station in Japan

Yamausu Station 山臼

General information
- Location: Menashidomari, Esashi, Esashi District, Hokkaido; Japan
- Coordinates: 45°1′26.9″N 142°31′47.4″E
- Operator: Japanese National Railways
- Line: Okhotsk North Line
- Distance: 19.8 km from Hamatonbetsu Station
- Platforms: 1 side platform
- Tracks: 1

Construction
- Structure type: At-grade

Other information
- Status: Closed

History
- Opened: 26 February 1956
- Closed: 1 July 1985
Location

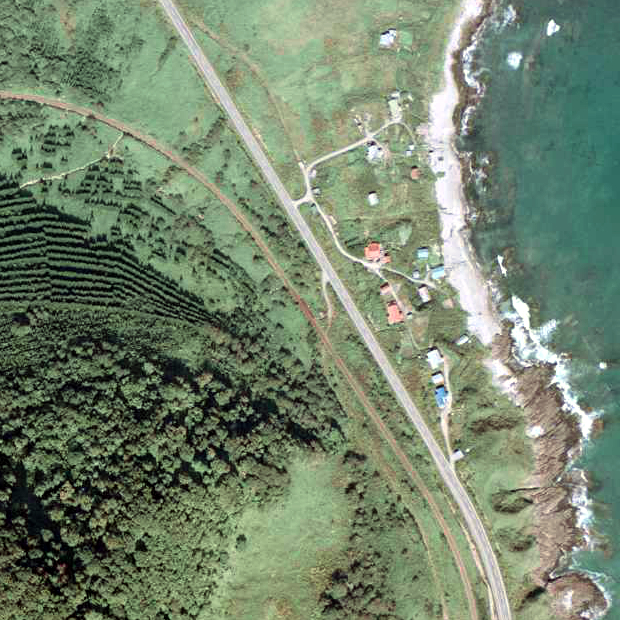
Yamausu Temporary Boarding Point and its surrounding area within a radius of approximately 500 metres in 1977. The lower part of the image is toward Kitami-Esashi. A level crossing was located on the Esashi side, while the platform was situated near the coast in the dark brown area to the north. A waiting shelter stood beside the level crossing.

Yamausu Temporary Boarding Point (山臼仮乗降場, Yamausu Kari-jōkōjō) was a temporary boarding point on the Okhotsk North Line in Esashi, Hokkaido, Japan, operated by Japanese National Railways (JNR). It was closed on 1 July 1985 when the Okhotsk North Line was discontinued.

== History ==
- 26 February 1956 – Yamausu Temporary Boarding Point was opened on the Okhotsk North Line of Japanese National Railways (JNR) as a temporary boarding point established by the railway administration bureau.
- 1 July 1985 – The entire Okhotsk North Line was discontinued, and Yamausu Temporary Boarding Point was closed.

== Station layout ==
Prior to its closure, Yamausu Temporary Boarding Point was an at-grade station consisting of a single side platform serving one track. The platform was located near the coast and was adjacent to a waiting shelter.

== Etymology ==
The station was named after the locality in which it was situated. The place name is derived from the Ainu language term yam-wakka-us, meaning "a place with always cold water".

== Adjacent Stations ==
Japanese National Railways
Kōhin North Line (discontinued in 1985)

Menashidomari Station – Yamausu Temporary Stop – Toimaki Station

== Surrounding area ==
- National Route 238 (Sōya National Highway)
- Soya Bus "Tommaki Shōgakkō-mae" bus stop

== See also ==
- List of railway stations in Japan: Ya
- Specified local lines
