= Aonogahara Station =

Railway station in Ono, Hyōgo Prefecture, Japan

Aonogahara Station 青野ヶ原駅
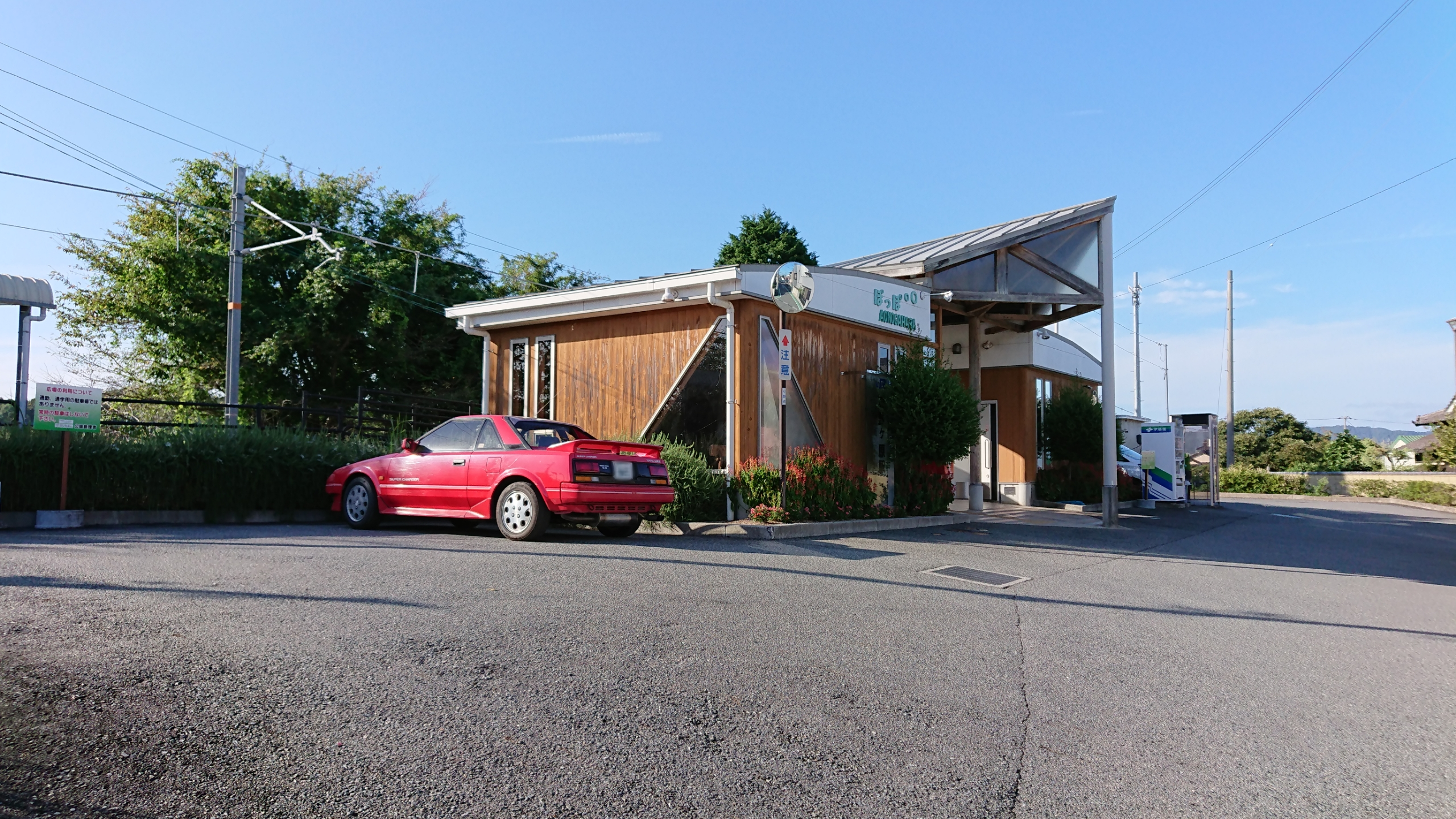
- Aonogahara Station in May 2020

General information
- Location: Fukui-chō, Ono-shi, Hyōgo-ken 675-1352; Japan
- Coordinates: 34.8974°N 134.9278°E
- Operator: JR West
- Line: I Kakogawa Line
- Distance: 21.3 km (13.2 miles) from Kakogawa
- Platforms: 1 side platform
- Tracks: 1
- Connections: Bus stop

Construction
- Structure type: Ground level

Other information
- Status: Unstaffed
- Website: Official website

History
- Opened: 10 August 1913
- Former names: Daimonguchi (to 1916): Bantetsu-Daimon (to 1943)

Passengers
- FY2019: 158 daily

Services
Preceding station	JR West	Following station
Kawanishi towards Kakogawa	Kakogawa Line Local	Yashirocho towards Tanikawa
Location
- Location within Hyōgo Prefecture Location within Japan

Aonogahara Station (青野ヶ原駅, Aonogahara-eki) is a passenger railway station located in the city of Ono, Hyōgo Prefecture, Japan, operated by West Japan Railway Company (JR West).

== Lines ==
Aonogahara Station is served by the Kakogawa Line and is 21.3 kilometers from the terminus of the line at Kakogawa

== Station layout ==
The station consists of one ground-level side platform serving a single bi-directional track. The station is unattended.

== History ==
Aonogahara Station opened on 10 August 1913 as Daimonguchi Station (大門口駅). It was renamed Bantetsu-Daimon Station (播鉄大門駅) on 22 November 1916. When the line was nationalized on June 1, 1943, the name was changed to its present name. With the privatization of JNR on 1 April 1987, the station came under the control of JR West.

== Passenger statistics ==
In fiscal 2019, the station was used by an average of 158 passengers daily

== Surrounding area ==
- Japan Ground Self-Defense Force Camp Aonohara

== See also ==
- List of railway stations in Japan
