= Kōdo temple ruins =

Archaeological site in Hyogo prefecture, Japan

- 広渡廃寺跡 (Japanese)
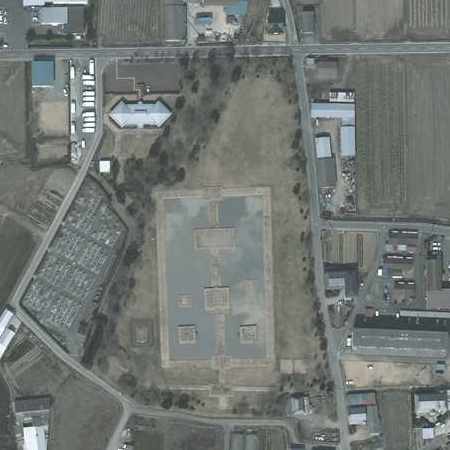
- Aerial photograph of the ruins of Kodo Haiji Temple

- Kōdo temple ruins Kōdo temple ruins (Japan)
- Interactive map of Kōdo temple ruins
- 34°52′00″N 134°56′23″E
- Type: temple ruins
- Periods: Nara to Heian period
- Location: Ono, Hyōgo, Japan
- Region: Kansai region

History
- Built: 7th century AD

Site notes
- Public access: Yes (park and museum)

The Kōdo temple ruins (広渡廃寺跡, Kōdo haiji ato) is an archaeological site with the ruins of a late Nara to Heian period Buddhist temple located in the city of Ono, Hyōgo Prefecture, in the Kansai region of Japan. The site was designated a National Historic Site in 1980.

== Overview ==
Kōdo temple ruins are located on a river terrace in the middle reaches of the Kakogawa River, almost in the center of the Harima region. The temple occupied an enclosed compound approximately 100 meters from east-to-west and 150 meters from north-to-south. The layout appears to have been based on Yakushi-ji in Nara, with twin east and west Pagodas in a courtyard between the Kondō and the Middle Gate, with a Lecture Hall situated behind the Kondō, and with a cloister connecting the Middle Gate with the sides of the Lecture Hall. The pagoda foundations were of rammed earth, with a remaining height of 0.7 meters, measuring ten meters square. The Kondo was a 15 x 12 meter structure, and the Lecture Hall was a 23 x 11.5 meter structure. Artifacts excavated include earthenware, roof tile pieces, fragments of Buddhist statues, and decorative metal fittings. These relics date the temple to the early Nara period, and indicate that it was once destroyed by fire and revived in the Heian period. It is believed to have declined and eventually disappeared by the end of the Heian period. The name of the temple is unknown as it does not appear in any surviving documentary sources. The site is now a historical park with a museum and a model of the temple on display.

== See also ==
- List of Historic Sites of Japan (Hyōgo)
