= Takasago Line =

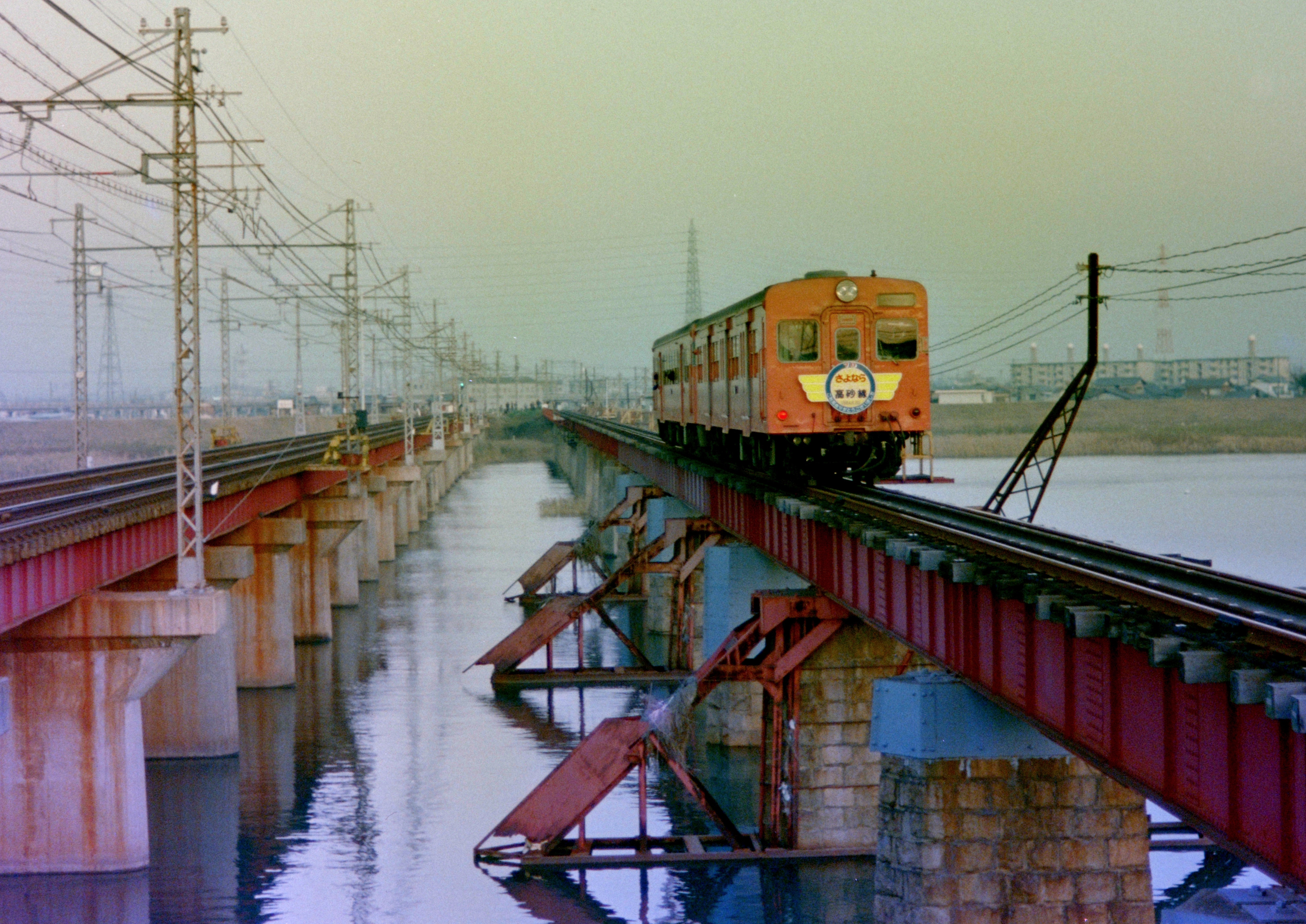
The farewell train bound for Kakogawa, consisting of Kiha 36, 41 and Kiha 23, passes over the Kakogawa Bridge on the Takasago Line of the Japanese National Railways.

The Takasago Line (高砂線, Takasago-sen) was an 8.0-kilometer long railway line of Japanese National Railways between Kakogawa and Takasago all within Hyōgo Prefecture, Japan. This line existed between 1913 and 1984.

== History ==
The Banshū Railway (播州鉄道, Banshū Tetsudō) opened the line between Kakogawachō and Takasagoguchi (2.9 miles) on December 1, 1913. The line was extended 1.9 miles to Takasagoura on September 25, 1914 completing the 4.8-mile line. The 0.9-mile section between Takasago and Takasagoura ceased passenger service in 1921.

The railway was acquired by the Bantan Railway (播丹鉄道, Bantan Tetsudō) in 1923 and nationalized in 1943 together with other Bantan Railway lines, i.e. the Kakogawa Line, the Kajiya Line, the Miki Line and the Hōjō Line. At the time of nationalization, Kakogawachō Station was merged to JGR Kakogawa Station and Takasagoura Station was renamed Takasagokō Station.

Japanese National Railways (JNR) included the line in the list of specified local lines to be closed, and closed it for freight service (completely closing the freight-only Takasago–Takasagokō section) on February 1, 1984 and for passenger service on December 1, 1984. The line's short length, the decline in demand for rail freight services, and its proximity to the much more heavily used Sanyo Electric Railway Main Line for passenger service, were contributing factors to its decline and eventual abandonment.

== Stations ==
As of 1984, the line had seven stations:

Name		Distance (km)	Connections	Location	
Kakogawa	加古川	0.0	Sanyo Main Line, Kakogawa Line	Kakogawa	Hyōgo
Noguchi	野口	2.0		Kakogawa	Hyōgo
Kakurinji	鶴林寺	2.7		Kakogawa	Hyōgo
Onoe	尾上	3.7		Kakogawa	Hyōgo
Takasago-Kitaguchi	高砂北口	5.7		Takasago	Hyōgo
Takasago	高砂	6.3		Takasago	Hyōgo
Takasagokō (Freight)	高砂港	8.0		Takasago	Hyōgo

== Passengers ==
The fares of Takasago Line were cheap, but Takasago Line has few trains, so it was not comfortable. Because of that, most of passengers were high school students.
