= Kakogawa Line =

Railway line in Hyogo prefecture, Japan

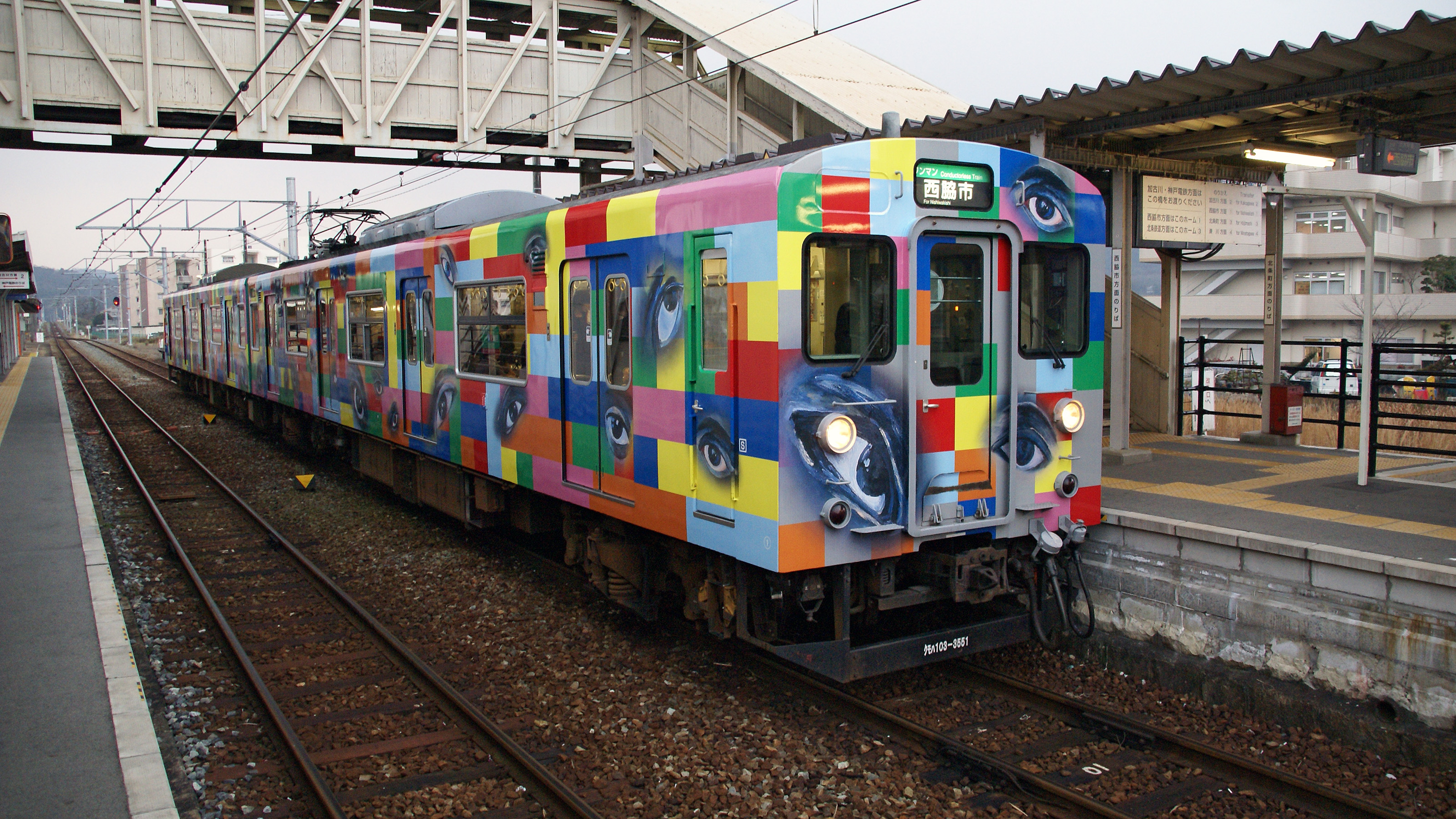
- A Kakogawa Line train with artistic design by Tadanori Yokoo

Overview
- Owner: JR West
- Locale: Hyōgo Prefecture
- Termini: Kakogawa; Tanikawa
- Stations: 21

Service
- Rolling stock: 103 series, 125 series

History
- Opened: 1 April 1913; 111 years ago
- Last extension: 27 December 1924; 100 years ago

Technical
- Line length: 48.5 km (30.1 mi)
- Track gauge: 1,067 mm (3 ft 6 in)
- Electrification: 1,500 V DC (overhead line)
- Operating speed: 85 km/h (53 mph)

The Kakogawa Line (加古川線, Kakogawa-sen) is a railway line in Hyōgo Prefecture, Japan, operated by West Japan Railway Company (JR West), which connects the cities of Kakogawa and Tamba.

The 48.5-kilometre (30.1 mi) line begins at Kakogawa Station on the JR Kobe Line (Sanyō Main Line) and ends at Tanikawa Station on the Fukuchiyama Line.

== History ==
The Banshu Railway opened the Kakogawa - Nishiwakishi section in 1913, and extended the line to Tanikawa in 1924. The company was nationalised in 1943.

Freight services ceased in 1986, and CTC signalling was commissioned on the entire line in 2004.

Former branches of the Kakogawa Line included the Takasago Line (connected at Kakogawa Station), the Miki Line (connected at Yakujin Station) and the Kajiya Line (connected at Nomura Station, i.e. present-day Nishiwakishi Station).

== Stations ==
Station	Japanese	Distance (km)	Transfers	Location	
Kakogawa	加古川	0.0	JR Kobe Line (Sanyō Main Line) (Takasago Line - closed 1984)	Kakogawa	Hyōgo; Prefecture
Hioka	日岡	2.5		Kakogawa	Hyōgo; Prefecture
Kanno	神野	4.8		Kakogawa	Hyōgo; Prefecture
Yakujin	厄神	7.4	(Miki Railway Miki Line - closed 2008)	Kakogawa	Hyōgo; Prefecture
Ichiba	市場	11.5		Ono	Hyōgo; Prefecture
Onomachi	小野町	13.7		Ono	Hyōgo; Prefecture
Ao	粟生	16.6	Hōjō Railway Line; Shintetsu Ao Line	Ono	Hyōgo; Prefecture
Kawainishi	河合西	19.2		Ono	Hyōgo; Prefecture
Aonogahara	青野ヶ原	21.3		Ono	Hyōgo; Prefecture
Yashirochō	社町	24.2		Katō	Hyōgo; Prefecture
Takino	滝野	27.3		Katō	Hyōgo; Prefecture
Taki	滝	28.4		Katō	Hyōgo; Prefecture
Nishiwakishi	西脇市	31.2	(Kajiya Line - closed 1990)	Nishiwaki	Hyōgo; Prefecture
Shin-Nishiwaki	新西脇	32.3		Nishiwaki	Hyōgo; Prefecture
Hie	比延	34.6		Nishiwaki	Hyōgo; Prefecture
Nihon-heso-kōen	日本へそ公園	36.1		Nishiwaki	Hyōgo; Prefecture
Kurodashō	黒田庄	38.5		Nishiwaki	Hyōgo; Prefecture
Hon-Kuroda	本黒田	42.0		Nishiwaki	Hyōgo; Prefecture
Funamachiguchi	船町口	43.8		Nishiwaki	Hyōgo; Prefecture
Kugemura	久下村	46.3		Tamba	Hyōgo; Prefecture
Tanikawa	谷川	48.5	Fukuchiyama Line	Tamba	Hyōgo; Prefecture

== Rolling stock ==
- 103 series EMUs
- 125 series EMUs

=== Former ===
- KiHa 20 DMUs
- KiHa 23 DMUs
- KiHa 30/35 DMUs
- KiHa 37 DMUs
- KiHa 40/47 DMUs
