= Ono, Hyōgo =

Ono 小野市
- City
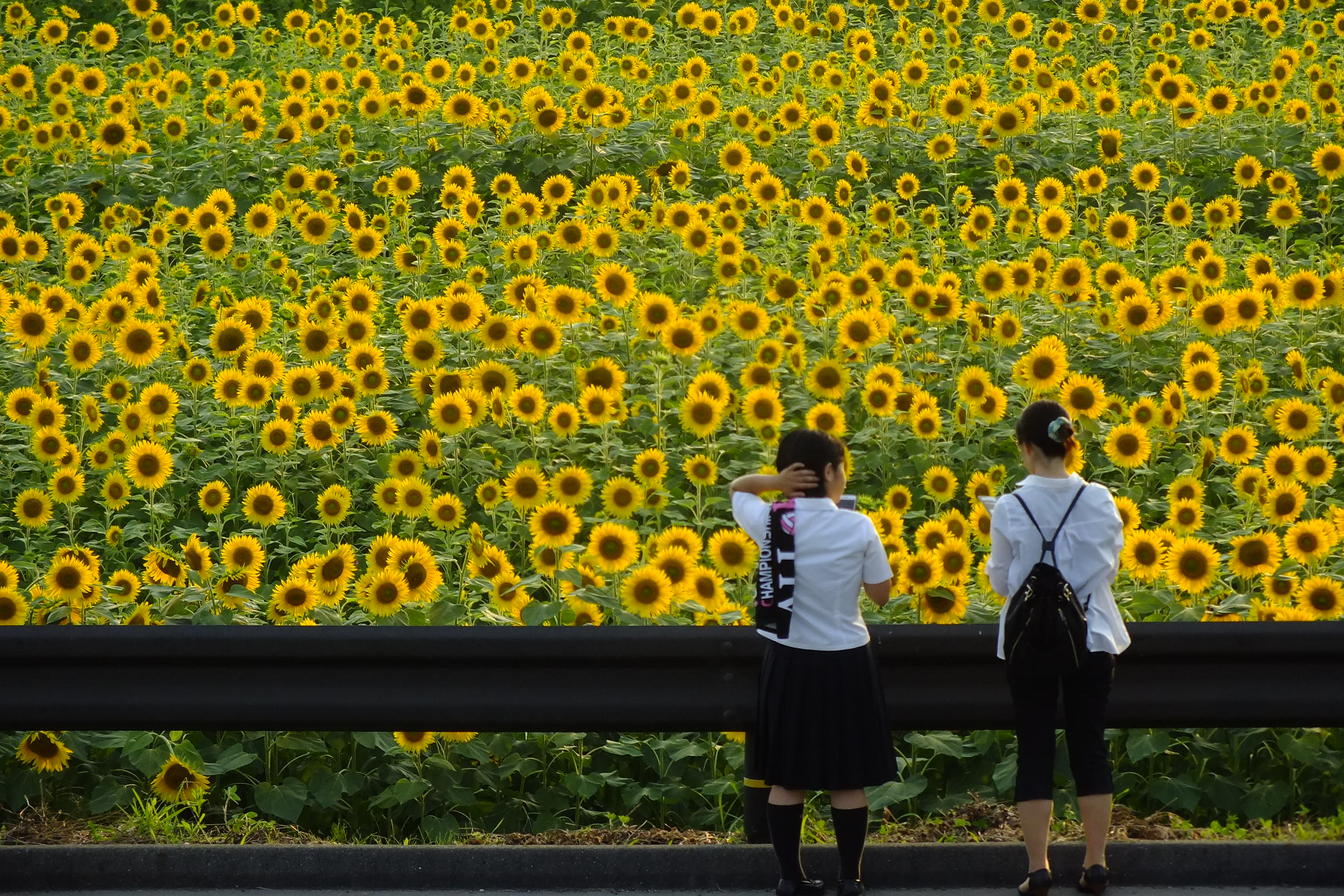
- Ono Hamawari-no-oka Park

- Seal

- Location of Ono in Hyōgo Prefecture

- Location in Japan
- Coordinates: 34°50′59″N 134°56′03″E
- Country: Japan
- Region: Kansai
- Prefecture: Hyōgo

Government
  - Mayor: Tsutomu Horai (since February 1999)

Area
  - Total: 92.94 km^{2} (35.88 sq mi)

Population (April 30, 2022)
  - Total: 47,609
  - Density: 512.3/km^{2} (1,327/sq mi)
- Time zone: UTC+09:00 (JST)
- City hall address: Ōji-chō 806-1, Ono-shi, Hyōgo-ken 675-1380
- Website: Official website
- Symbols
- Flower: Helianthus annuus
- Tree: Willow

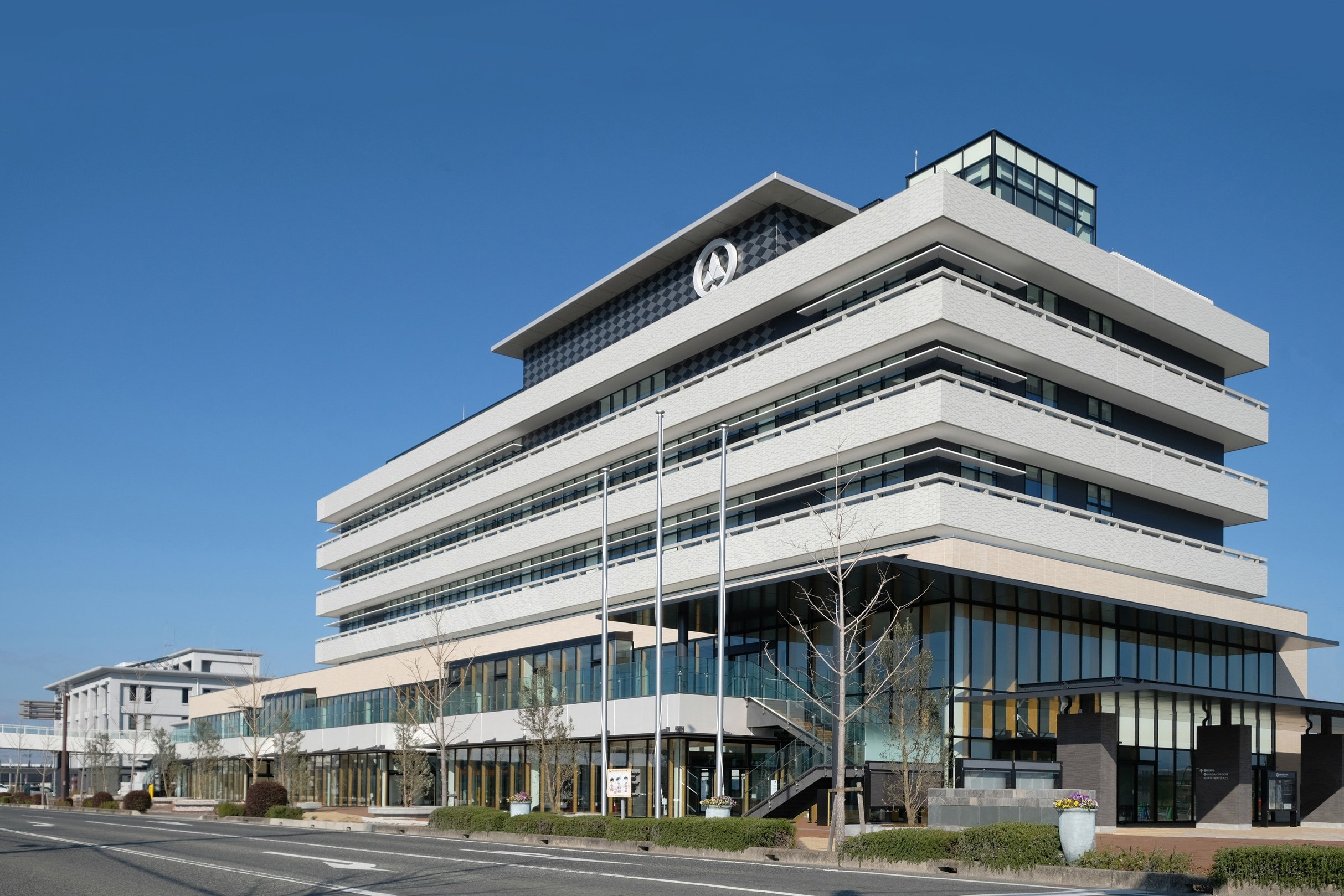
Ono City Hall

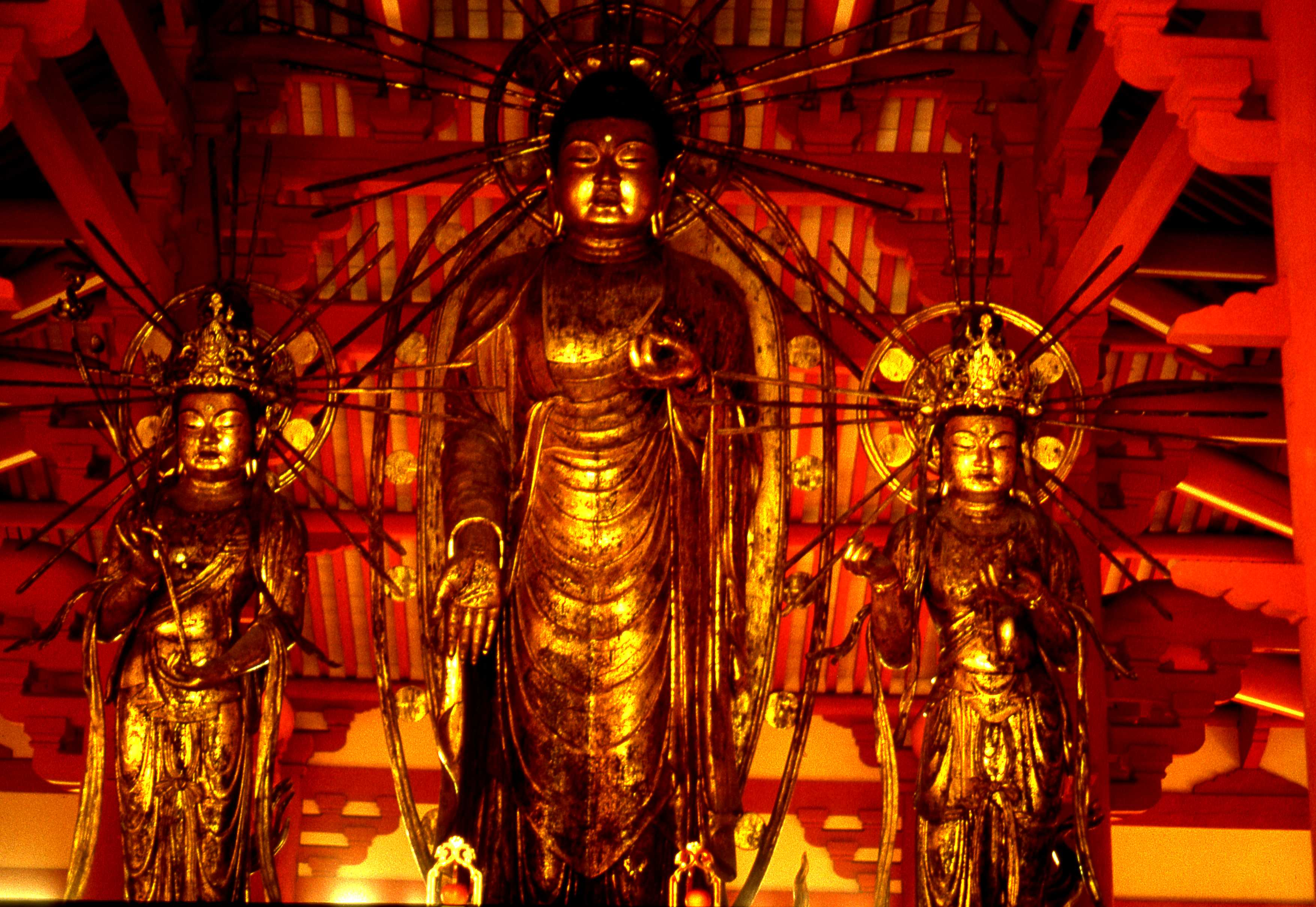
Three Statues of Jodo-ji Temple in Ono.It had a significant influence on Tadao Ando.

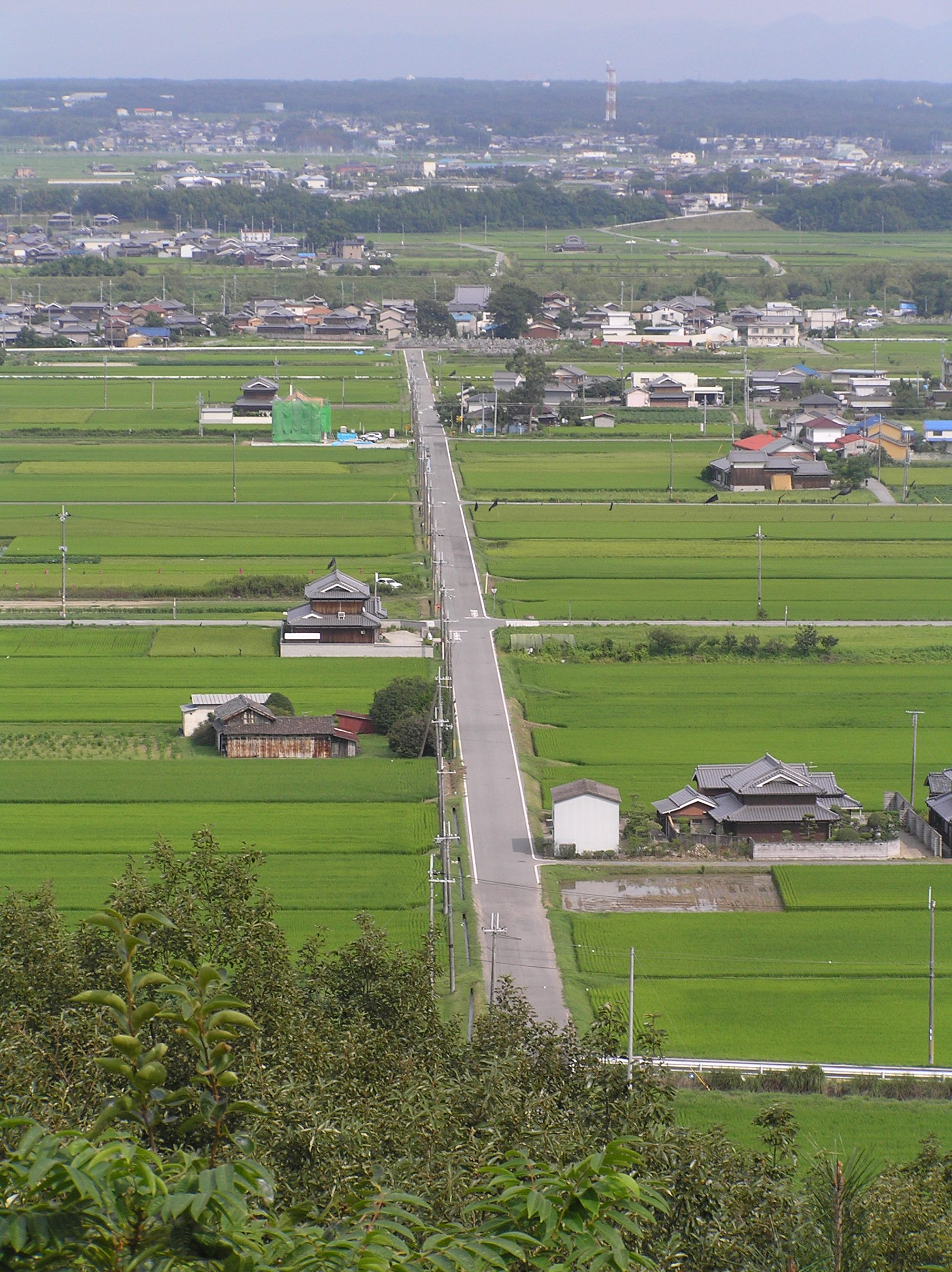
The tranquil landscape of Ono City

Ono (小野市, Ono-shi; Japanese pronunciation: [ò̞.nó̞(.ɕì)]) is a city located in Hyōgo Prefecture, Japan. As of 30 April 2022, the city had an estimated population of 47,609 in 20483 households and a population density of 510 persons per km². The total area of the city is 92.94 square kilometres (35.88 sq mi).

== Geography ==
Ono is located almost in the center of the Harima Plain, on the bank of the Kakogawa River.

=== Neighbouring municipalities ===
Hyōgo Prefecture

- Kakogawa
- Kasai
- Katō
- Miki

=== Climate ===
Ono has a humid subtropical climate (Köppen Cfa) characterized by warm summers and cool winters with light to no snowfall. The average annual temperature in Ono is 14.7 °C. The average annual rainfall is 1462 mm with September as the wettest month. The temperatures are highest on average in August, at around 26.4 °C, and lowest in January, at around 3.5 °C.

== Demographics ==
Per Japanese census data, the population of Ono has grown relatively steady over the past 60 years.

Historical population
Year	Pop.	±%
1960	36,343	—
1970	37,623	+3.5%
1980	43,574	+15.8%
1990	46,007	+5.6%
2000	49,432	+7.4%
2010	49,685	+0.5%

== History ==
The area of the modern city of Ono was within ancient Harima Province. The village of Ono was established within Katō District with the creation of the modern municipalities system on April 1, 1889. Ono was elevated to town status on May 1, 1915. On December 1, 1954 Ono merged with the neighboring villages of Kawai, Kishi, Ichiba, Obe, and Shimo-Hojo to form the city of Ono.

== Government ==
Ono has a mayor-council form of government with a directly elected mayor and a unicameral city council of 16 members. Ono contributes one member to the Hyogo Prefectural Assembly. In terms of national politics, the city is part of Hyōgo 4th district of the lower house of the Diet of Japan.

== Economy ==
The economy of Ono is centered around agriculture and light manufacturing. The city is noted as one of the largest producers of abacus in Japan, with over 70% market share. An official report puts the value of shipments at 1.25 million US dollars per year. In 1976, it was designated as a traditional craft by the Minister of Economy, Trade and Industry as "Banshu Soroban". Agriculture is centered on "Yamada Nishiki" brand rice.

== Education ==
Ono has eight public elementary schools and four public middle schools operated by the city government and two public high school operated by the Hyōgo Prefectural Department of Education. The prefecture also operates one special education school for the handicapped.

== Transportation ==
=== Railway ===
JR West - Kakogawa Line

- Ichiba -Onomachi - Ao - Kawainishi - Aonogahara

Kobe Electric Railway

- Kashiyama - Ichiba - Ono - Hata - Ao

Hōjō Railway Company – Hōjō Line

- Ao

=== Highway ===
- San'yō Expressway Miki-Ono IC
- National Route 175
- National Route 372
- National Route 427

== Sister cities ==
- Lindsay, California, United States, since February 1973

== Local attractions ==
- Jōdo-ji - Jōdodō completed in 1194 is a National Treasure of Japan.
- Kōdō temple ruins, National Historic Site
