= Specified local lines =

Selection of Japanese railway lines to be decommissioned

The specified local lines (特定地方交通線, Tokutei chihō kōtsū-sen) were the railway lines specified by Japanese National Railways (JNR) under the 1980 JNR Reconstruction Act (国鉄改革法, Kokutetsu kaikaku hō) to be closed. All of 83 lines were closed and substituted by buses or transferred to other railway operators between 1983 and 1990.

== Background ==
In 1972, when Kakuei Tanaka became the prime minister, all efforts to close the remaining lines of the 83 Deficit Lines movement were cancelled. However by the 1980s those remaining lines were relisted in the Specified local lines movement. Additionally, the effects of the 1973 oil crisis compounded the debt situation of the JNR in the form of rising fuel costs. The 1970s and 1980s also saw a rise in private automobiles and commercial aviation, leading to railroads across the country having a lower share across major modes of transport.

== Selection ==
Article 8 of the JNR Reconstruction Act (officially the Act on Special Measures concerning Reconstruction Promotion of Management of Japanese National Railways, Act No. 111 of 1980) directed JNR to specify unprofitable lines ("specified local lines") that should be replaced by bus operations based on certain criteria set by a Cabinet Order.

However, even if Units of transportation measurement were below 4000 per day, these 51 sections which met the following requirements were exempt from being decommissioned.

1. The amount of passengers at peak time is over 1000 per hour in one direction.
2. There is a lack of replacement roads.
3. Replacement roads cannot be used during the winter over 10 days due to snow.
4. The average length of usage is over 30km, and the units of transportation measurement is over 1000 per day.
5. If the line is being used for cargo transportation, the line was exempt if the line transported if units of transportation measurement for cargo exceeded 4000t of cargo transported per day.

JNR selected 83 lines in three phases.

== List of lines ==
Operators in parentheses succeeded the railway operation of the lines. Lines not followed by parentheses were substituted by buses.

=== First phase ===
- Shiranuka Line
- Kuji Line (Sanriku Railway)
- Miyako Line (Sanriku Railway)
- Sakari Line (Sanriku Railway)
- Nitchū Line
- Akatani Line
- Uonuma Line
- Shimizukō Line
- Kamioka Line (Kamioka Railway)
- Tarumi Line (Tarumi Railway)
- Kuroishi Line (Kōnan Railway)
- Takasago Line
- Miyanoharu Line
- Tsuma Line
- Komatsushima Line
- Aioi Line
- Shokotsu Line
- Manji Line
- Hōjō Line (Hōjō Railway)
- Miki Line (Miki Railway)
- Kurayoshi Line
- Katsuki Line
- Katsuta Line
- Soeda Line
- Muroki Line
- Yabe Line
- Iwanai Line
- Kōhin North Line
- Ōhata Line (Shimokita Kōtsū)
- Kōhin South Line
- Bikō Line
- Yashima Line (Yuri Kōgen Railway)
- Akechi Line (Akechi Railway)
- Amagi Line (Amagi Railway)
- Takamori Line (Minamiaso Railway)
- Kakunodate Line (Akita Nairiku Jūkan Railway)
- Shigaraki Line (Shigaraki Kohgen Railway)
- Wakasa Line (Wakasa Railway)
- Kihara Line (Isumi Railway)

=== Second phase ===
- Urushio Line
- Iburi Line
- Tomiuchi Line
- Aniai Line (Akita Nairiku Jūkan Railway)
- Etsumi South Line (Nagaragawa Railway)
- Miyanojō Line
- Hiroo Line
- Ōsumi Line
- Futamata Line (Tenryū Hamanako Railroad)
- Setana Line
- Yūmō Line
- Shihoro Line
- Ise Line (Ise Railway)
- Saga Line
- Shibushi Line
- Haboro Line
- Horonai Line
- Matsumae Line
- Utashinai Line
- Shibetsu Line
- Tempoku Line
- Nayoro Main Line
- Chihoku Line (Hokkaidō Chihoku Kōgen Railway)
- Aizu Line (Aizu Railway)
- Mooka Line (Mooka Railway)
- Ashio Line (Watarase Keikoku Railway)
- Gannichi Line (Nishikigawa Railway)
- Matsuura Line (Matsuura Railway)
- Kamiyamada Line
- Takachiho Line (Takachiho Railway)

=== Third phase ===
- Nagai Line (Yamagata Railway)
- Okata Line (Aichi Loop Railway)
- Noto Line (Noto Railway)
- Miyazu Line (Kitakinki Tango Railway)
- Kajiya Line
- Taisha Line
- Nakamura Line (Tosa Kuroshio Railway)
- Ita Line (Heisei Chikuhō Railway)
- Itoda Line (Heisei Chikuhō Railway)
- Tagawa Line (Heisei Chikuhō Railway)
- Yunomae Line (Kumagawa Railway)
- Miyada Line

== See also ==
- Beeching cuts
- 83 Deficit Lines
