= Kajiya Line =

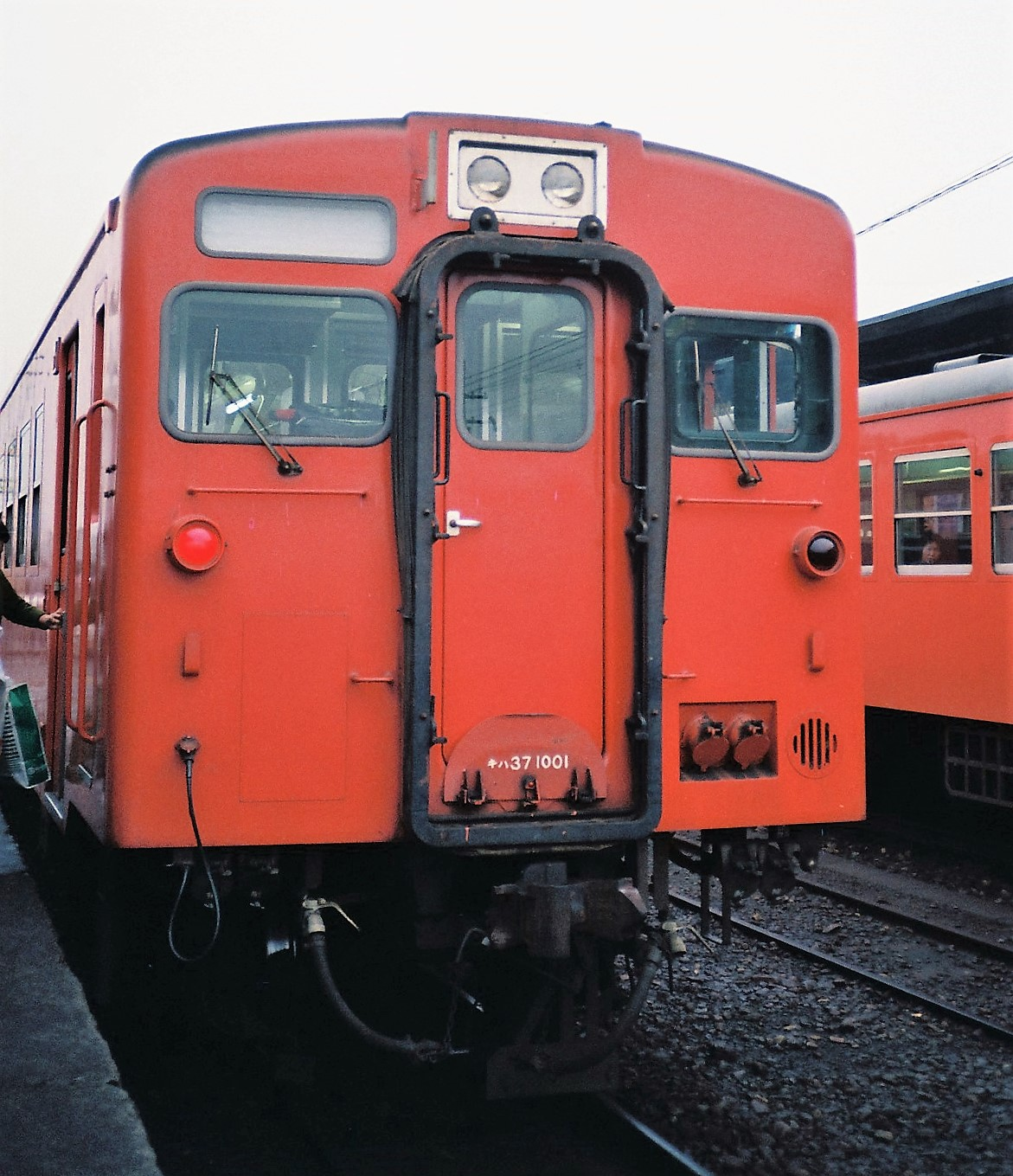
- A KiHa 37 DMU at Nishiwaki Station on the Kajiya Line in December 1986

Overview
- Native name: 鍛冶屋線
- Status: Ceased operation
- Owner: JR West
- Locale: Hyogo
- Termini: Nishiwakishi; Kajiya Station
- Stations: 7

Service
- Type: Commuter rail line
- Operator(s): JR West

History
- Opened: 10 August 1913; 111 years ago
- Closed: 1 April 1990

Technical
- Line length: 13.2 km (8.2 mi)
- Number of tracks: Entirely Single-tracked
- Character: Rural and urban
- Track gauge: 1,067 mm (3 ft 6 in)
- Electrification: None

The Kajiya Line (鍛冶屋線, Kajiya-sen) was a railway line of West Japan Railway Company between Nishiwaki and Taka District all within Hyōgo Prefecture, Japan. The line closed on April 1, 1990.

== Stations ==
Name		Distance (km)	Connections	Location	
Nomura^{1}	野村	0.0	Kakogawa Line	Nishiwaki	Hyōgo
Nishiwaki	西脇	1.6		Nishiwaki	Hyōgo
Ichihara	市原	4.7		Nishiwaki	Hyōgo
Hayasu	羽安	7.0		Nishiwaki	Hyōgo
Sogai	曽我井	8.8		Naka^{2}	Hyōgo
Nakamuramachi	中村町	10.9		Naka^{2}	Hyōgo
Kajiya	鍛冶屋	13.2		Naka^{2}	Hyōgo

Notes
1: Nomura Station was renamed Nishiwakishi Station upon closure of the Kajiya Line.
2: The former town of Naka became a part of the town of Taka in 2005.

== History ==
The Banshū Railway (播州鉄道, Banshū Tetsudō) opened the line between 1913 and 1923. The railway was acquired by the Bantan Railway (播丹鉄道, Bantan Tetsudō) in 1923 and nationalised in 1943 together with other Bantan Railway lines, i.e. the Kakogawa Line, the Takasago Line, the Miki Line, and the Hōjō Line.

Under the operation of Japanese National Railways (JNR), freight services ceased in 1974. JR West succeeded the line in 1987 and closed it in 1990, concurrently with the Miyazu Line and the Taisha Line, as the last of 83 "specified local lines" selected for closure.
