= Nishiwakishi Station =

Railway station in Nishiwaki, Hyōgo Prefecture, Japan

Nishiwakishi Station 西脇市駅
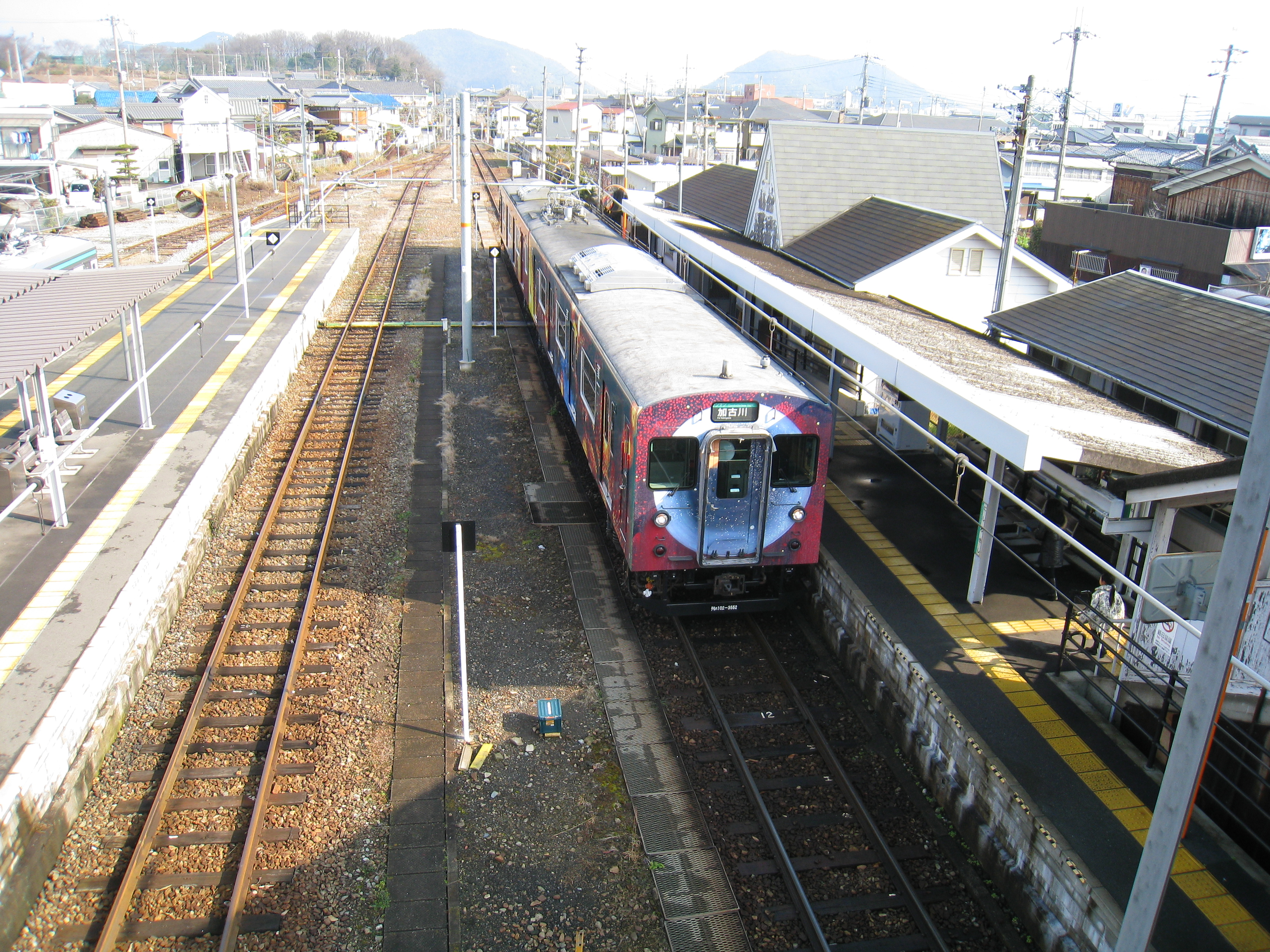
- Train at Nishiwakishi Station in March 2008

General information
- Location: Nomura-chō, Nishiwaki-shi, Hyōgo-ken 677-0054; Japan
- Coordinates: 34°58′19.43″N 134°58′8.64″E
- Operator: JR West
- Line: I Kakogawa Line
- Distance: 31.2 km (19.4 miles) from Kakogawa
- Platforms: 1 side + 1 island platform
- Connections: Bus stop

Other information
- Status: Staffed
- Website: Official website

History
- Opened: 22 October 1913
- Closed: Nomura Station (until 1990)

Passengers
- FY2019: 822 daily

Services
| Preceding station | JR West | Following station |
|---|---|---|
| Taki towards Kakogawa | Kakogawa Line Local | Shin-Nishiwaki towards Tanikawa |
Location
- Location within Hyōgo Prefecture Location within Japan

Nishiwakishi Station (西脇市駅, Nishiwakishi-eki) is a passenger railway station located in the city of Nishiwaki, Hyōgo Prefecture, Japan, operated by West Japan Railway Company (JR West).

== Lines ==
Nishiwakishi Station is served by the Kakogawa Line and is 31.2 kilometers from the terminus of the line at Kakogawa

== Station layout ==
The station consists of one ground-level side platform and one ground-level island platform, connected to the station building by a footbridge. The station is staffed.

== History ==
Nishiwakishi Station opened on 22 October 1913 as Nomura Station (野村駅, Nomura-eki). With the privatization of the Japan National Railways (JNR) on 1 April 1987, the station came under the aegis of the West Japan Railway Company. It was renamed to its present name on 31 March 1990. The Kajiya Line, closed in 1990, originated at this station.

== Passenger statistics ==
In fiscal 2019, the station was used by an average of 822 passengers daily.

== Surrounding area ==
- Yasaka Shrine
- Hyogo Prefectural Nishiwaki Technical High School
- Nishiwaki City Nishiwaki Minami Junior High School

== See also ==
- List of railway stations in Japan
