= Kakogawa Station =

Railway station in Kakogawa, Hyōgo Prefecture, Japan

Kakogawa Station 加古川駅
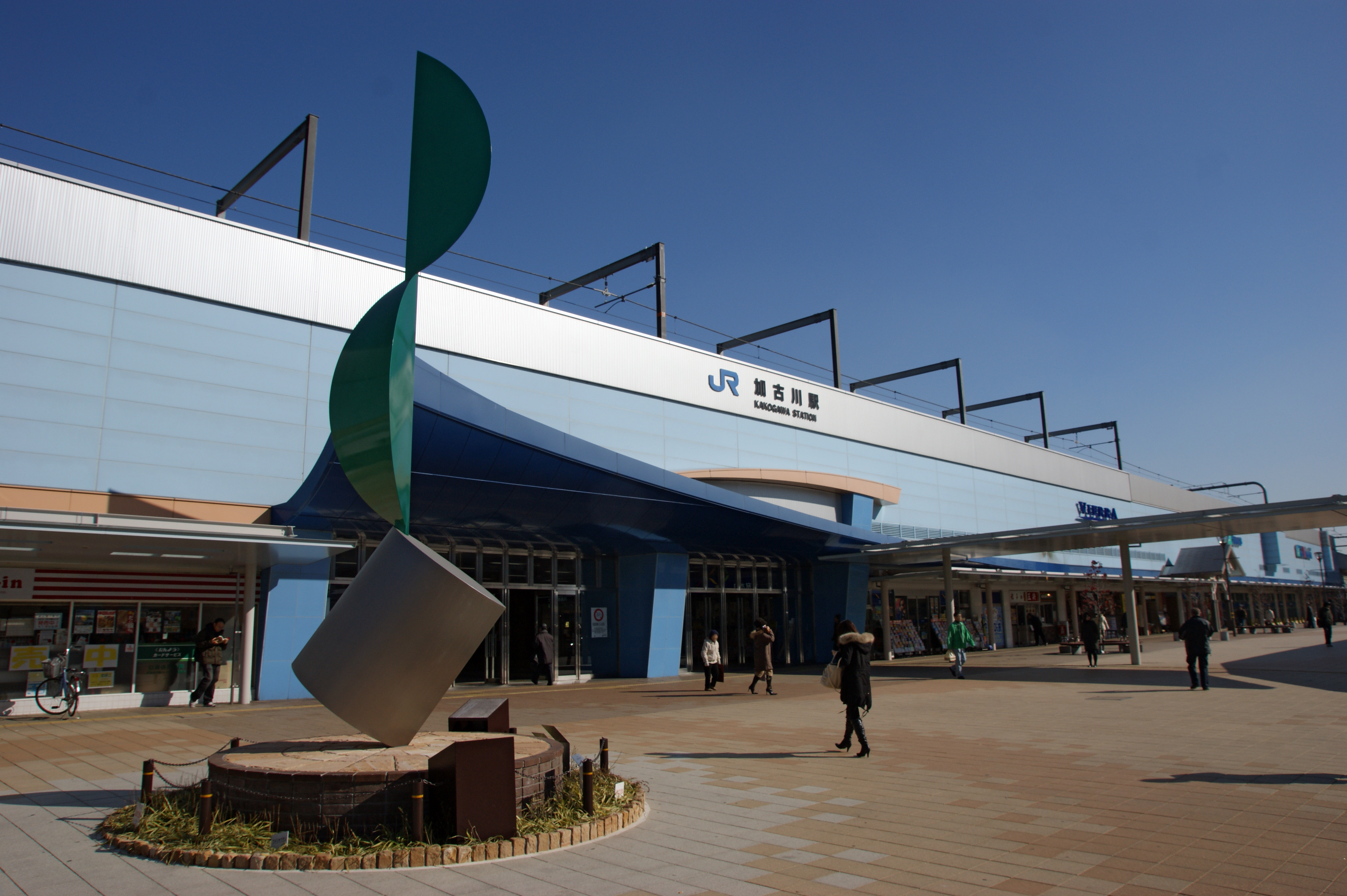
- Kakogawa Station south exit, December 2008

General information
- Location: Shinoharacho Kakogawacho, Kakogawa-shi, Hyōgo-ken 675-0065; Japan
- Coordinates: 34.767828°N 134.839432°E
- Owner: West Japan Railway Company
- Operator: West Japan Railway Company
- Lines: San'yō Main Line (JR Kobe Line); Kakogawa Line
- Distance: 39.1 km (24.3 miles) from Kōbe
- Platforms: 3 island platforms
- Tracks: 6

Construction
- Structure type: Elevated
- Accessible: Yes

Other information
- Status: Staffed (Midori no Madoguchi)
- Station code: JR-A79
- Website: Official website

History
- Opened: 23 December 1888

Passengers
- FY2019: 23,989 daily

Services
Preceding station	JR West	Following station
Himeji Terminus	JR Kōbe Line Special Rapid Rakuraku Harima	Nishi-Akashi towards Ōsaka
Hoden towards Himeji	JR Kōbe Line Rapid	Higashi-Kakogawa towards Ōsaka
Terminus	JR Kōbe Line Local (some services)	Higashi-Kakogawa towards Ōsaka
Terminus	Kakogawa Line Local	Hioka towards Tanikawa
Location
- Location within Hyōgo Prefecture Location within Japan

Kakogawa Station (加古川駅, Kakogawa-eki) is a passenger railway station located in the city of Kakogawa, Hyōgo Prefecture, Japan, operated by the West Japan Railway Company (JR West).

== Lines ==
Kakogawa Station is served by the JR San'yō Main Line, and is located 39.1 kilometers from the terminus of the line at Kōbe and 72.2 kilometers from Osaka. It is also the southern terminus of the 48.1 kilometer Kakogawa Line to Tanikawa.

== Station layout ==
The station consists of three elevated island platforms with the station building underneath. The station has a Midori no Madoguchi staffed ticket office.

=== Platforms ===
1	■ San'yō Main Line (JR Kobe Line)	for Himeji and Aioi
2	■ San'yō Main Line (JR Kobe Line)	for Himeji and Aioi returning for Sannomiya and Osaka
3, 4	■ San'yō Main Line (JR Kobe Line)	for Sannomiya and Osaka
5, 6	■ Kakogawa Line	for Ao and Nishiwakishi

== History ==
The station opened on 23 December 1888 when the Sanyō Railway extended from Akashi to Himeji. On 1 April 1913, Banshū Railway (now Kakogawa Line) opened its terminal named Kakogawachō, which was merged into Kakogawa Station later (the railway company's application was posted on the Official Gazette (Kanpō) on 14 May 1915, but the actual date of the merger is unknown). The Banshū Railway also opened the line later named the Takasago Line originating from Kakogawachō on 1 December 1913. The Takasago Line closed on December 1, 1984. With the privatization of the Japan National Railways (JNR) on 1 April 1987, the station came under the aegis of the West Japan Railway Company.

Station numbering was introduced to the Kobe Line platforms in March 2018 with Kakogawa being assigned station number JR-A79.

== Passenger statistics ==
In fiscal 2019, the station was used by an average of 23,989 passengers daily

== Surrounding area ==
- Japan National Route 2
- Hyogo Prefectural Kakogawa Higashi High School
- Hyogo Prefectural Kakogawa Nishi High School
- Kakogawa Municipal Kakogawa Junior High School

== See also ==
- List of railway stations in Japan
