= Tanikawa Station =

Railway station in Tamba, Hyōgo Prefecture, Japan

Tanikawa Station 谷川駅
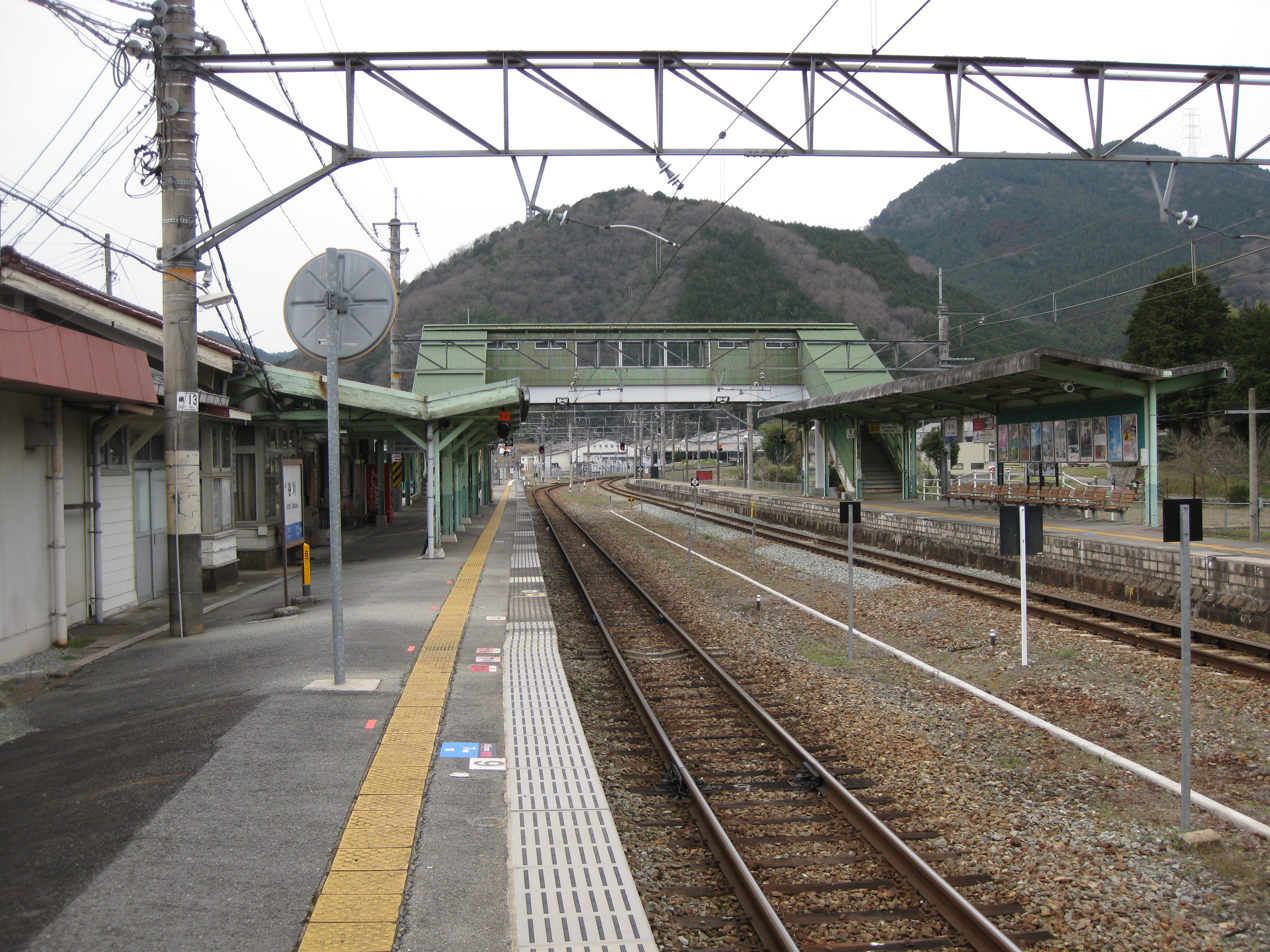
- Tanikawa Station in March 2013

General information
- Location: Sannancho Ikedani, Tamba-shi, Hyōgo-ken 669-3125; Japan
- Coordinates: 35.0838°N 135.0495°E
- Owner: West Japan Railway Company
- Operator: West Japan Railway Company
- Lines: Fukuchiyama Line; Kakogawa Line
- Distance: 73.0 km (45.4 miles) from Amagasaki
- Platforms: 1 side + 1 island platform
- Connections: Bus stop

Other information
- Status: Staffed (Midori no Madoguchi )
- Website: Official website

History
- Opened: 15 July 1899

Passengers
- FY2016: 453 daily
Location
- Location within Hyōgo Prefecture Location within Japan

Tanikawa Station (谷川駅, Tanikawa-eki) is a junction passenger railway station located in the city of Tamba, Hyōgo Prefecture, Japan, operated by West Japan Railway Company (JR West).

== Lines ==
Tanikawa Station is served by the Fukuchiyama Line, and is located 73.0 kilometers from the terminus of the line at Amagasaki. It is also the northern terminus of the Kakogawa Line, and is 48.5 kilometers from the opposing terminus of that line at Kakogawa.

== Station layout ==
The station consists of one ground-level side platform and one ground level island platform connected to the station building by a footbridge. One side of the island platform is dead headed, and is used by the Kakogawa Line. This platform is unnumbered. The station has a Midori no Madoguchi staffed ticket office.

=== Platforms ===
1	■ Fukuchiyama Line	for Fukuchiyama
2	■ Fukuchiyama Line	for Sasayamaguchi and Sanda
	■ Kakogawa Line	for Nishiwakishi, Kakogawa

== Adjacent stations ==
«	Service	»
Fukuchiyama Line
Shimotaki	Local	Kaibara
Shimotaki	Tambaji Rapid Service	Kaibara
Kakogawa Line
Kugemura	-	Terminus

== History ==
Tanikawa Station opened on May 25, 1899. With the privatization of the Japan National Railways (JNR) on April 1, 1987, the station came under the aegis of the West Japan Railway Company.

== Passenger statistics ==
In fiscal 2016, the station was used by an average of 453 passengers daily

== Surrounding area ==
- Tamba City Kushita Elementary School

== See also ==
- List of railway stations in Japan
