= Taki Station =

Taki Station is the name of three train stations in Japan:

- Taki Station (Mie) (多気駅)
- Taki Station (Hyōgo) (滝駅)
- Taki Station (Tochigi) (滝駅)
