= Katō District =

Katō District may refer to:

- Katō District, Hokkaido
- Katō District, Hyōgo
