= Katō, Hyōgo =

Katō 加東市
- City
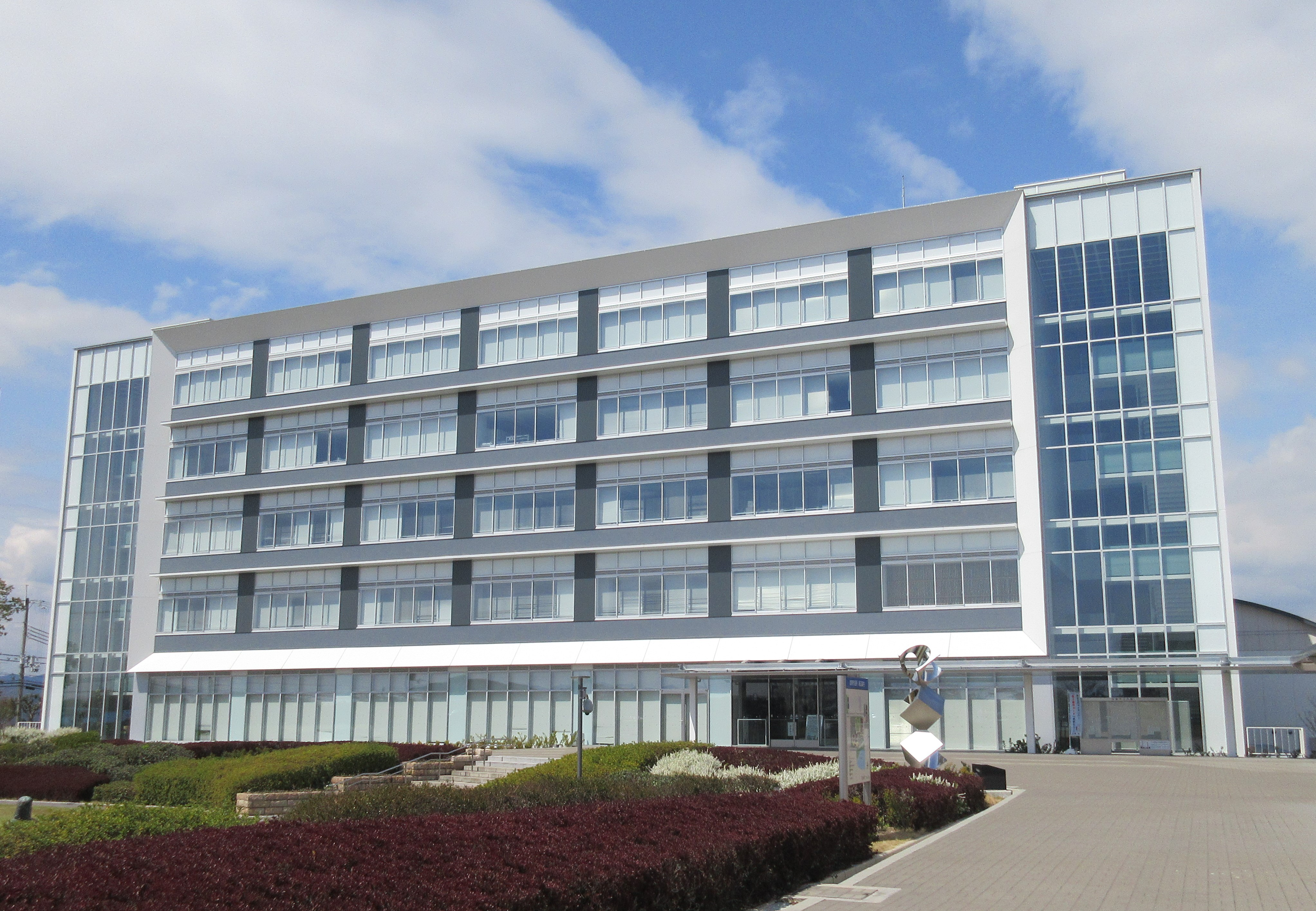
- Kato City Office

- Flag Emblem

- Location of Katō in Hyōgo Prefecture

- Location in Japan
- Coordinates: 34°55′N 134°58′E
- Country: Japan
- Region: Kansai
- Prefecture: Hyōgo
- First official recorded: 76 BC (official confirmed)
- Takino town settled: April 1, 1925
- Tojo and Yashiro town settledf: March 31, 1955
- Three municipalities merged: March 20, 2006

Government
  - Mayor: Tadashi Iwane|(岩根正) - from April 2022

Area
  - Total: 157.55 km^{2} (60.83 sq mi)

Population (April 30, 2022)
  - Total: 39,628
  - Density: 251.53/km^{2} (651.45/sq mi)
- Time zone: UTC+09:00 (JST)
- City hall address: 50 Yashiro, Kato-shi, Hyogo-ken 673-1493
- Website: Official website
- Symbols
- Flower: Cosmos
- Tree: Cherry blossom

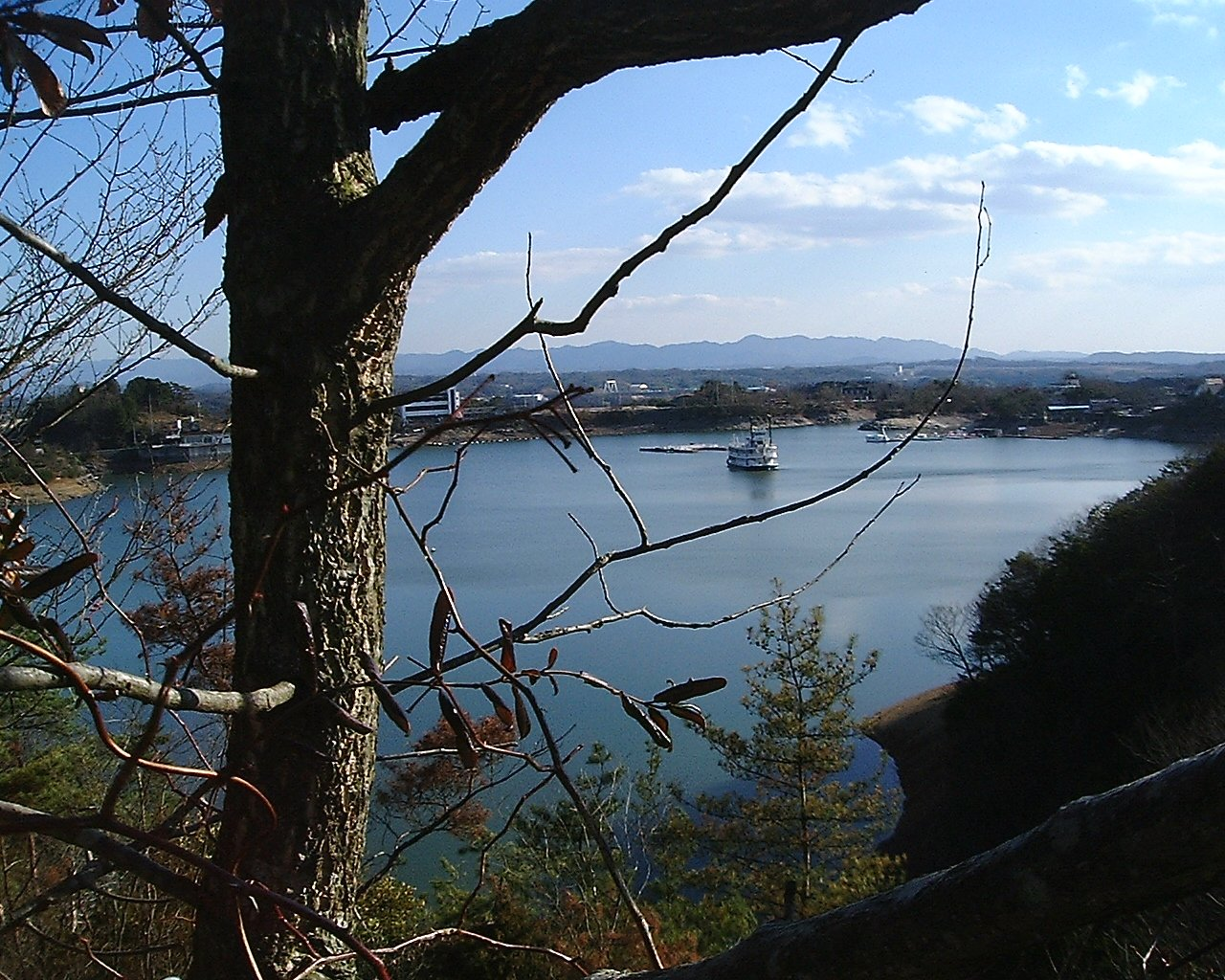
Lake Tōjō

Katō (加東市, Katō-shi) is a city in Hyōgo Prefecture, Japan. As of 30 April 2022, the city had an estimated population of 39,628 in 17199 households and a population density of 250 persons per km^{2}. The total area of the city is 157.55 square kilometres (60.83 sq mi).

== Geography ==
Katō is located slightly south of central Hyogo Prefecture in the Harima region of the prefecture. The Kakogawa River and many of its tributaries flow through the city. Part of the city is within the borders of the Kiyomizu-Tōjōko-Tachikui Prefectural Natural Park.

=== Neighbouring municipalities ===
Hyōgo Prefecture

- Kasai
- Miki
- Nishiwaki
- Ono
- Sanda
- Sasayama

=== Climate ===
Kasai has a humid subtropical climate (Köppen Cfa) characterized by warm summers and cool winters with light to no snowfall. There is a relatively warm climate throughout the four seasons. There are few disasters caused by typhoons and snowfall, and the average annual temperature is slightly lower than the coastal area of the Seto Inland Sea, but the amount of precipitation is slightly higher.

== Demographics ==
Per Japanese census data, the population of Katō has remained relatively steady over the past 40 years.

Historical population
Year	Pop.	±%
1960	34,170	—
1970	32,149	−5.9%
1980	34,275	+6.6%
1990	38,270	+11.7%
2000	40,688	+6.3%
2010	40,181	−1.2%

== History ==
The area of the modern city of Katō was within ancient Harima Province. During the Edo Period, the region was divided into a mosaic of small holdings by various feudal domains, with large portions held by Ono and Himeji Domains, Hamamatsu Domain and Tanakura Domain. The jin'ya of the minor Mikusa Domain was located in Katō. Following the Meiji restoration, the villages of Takino and Yashiro were created within Katō District with the establishment of the modern municipalities system on April 1, 1889. Yashiro was elevated to town status on June 1, 1912 followed by Takino on April 1, 1925. The city of Katō, which now occupies the northern two-thirds of former Katō District was established on March 20, 2006 from the merger of Takino and Yashiro with the town of Tōjō.

== Government ==
Katō has a mayor-council form of government with a directly elected mayor and a unicameral city council of 18 members. Katō contributes one member to the Hyogo Prefectural Assembly. In terms of national politics, the city is part of Hyōgo 4th district of the lower house of the Diet of Japan.

== Economy ==
Katō is a regional commercial center, with a mixed local economy of agriculture and light manufacturing.

== Education ==
Katō has seven public elementary schools, two public middle schools and one public combined elementary/middle school operated by the city government and one public high school operated by the Hyōgo Prefectural Department of Education. The prefecture also operates one special education school for the handicapped. The Hyogo University of Teacher Education is located in Katō and also operates its own high school.

== Transportation ==
=== Railway ===
JR West - Kakogawa Line

- Yashirochō -Takino - Taki

=== Highways ===
- Chūgoku Expressway
- National Route 175
- National Route 372

== Sister cities ==
Katō is twinned with:

- Olympia, Washington, United States

== Local attractions ==
- Chōkō-ji, Buddhist temple with National Treasure Main Hall
- Kiyomiu-dera (Katō), 25th temple on the Saigoku Kannon Pilgrimage
- Lake Tōjō

== Sports facilities ==
- Greenhill Stadium, a baseball stadium in Katō, Hyōgo

== Noted people from Kato ==
- Keiji Shibazaki, admiral in the Imperial Japanese Navy
