= Kiyomizu-Tōjōko-Tachikui Prefectural Natural Park =

Prefectural Natural Park in Hyōgo Prefecture

- 清水東条湖立杭県立自然公園
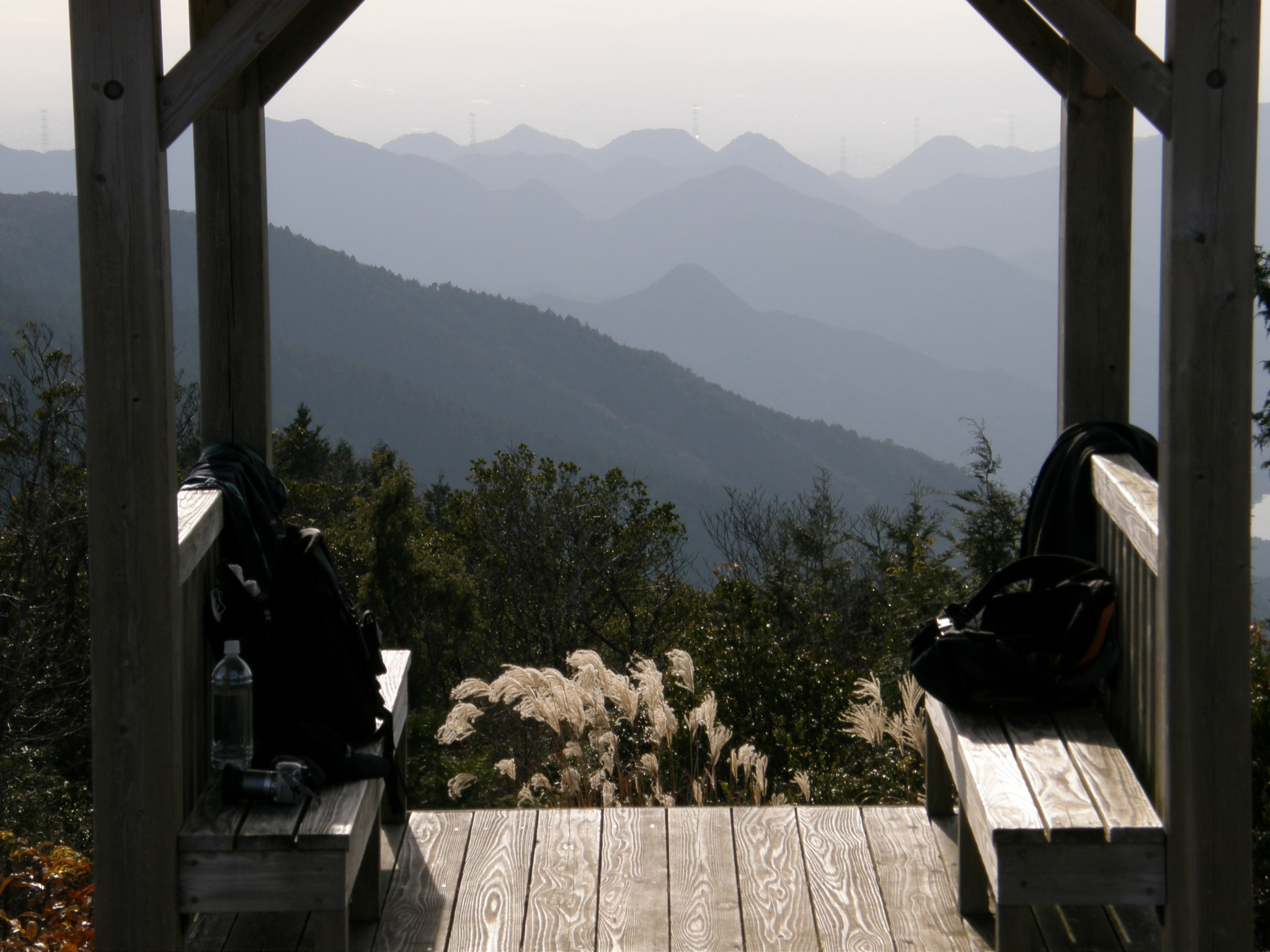
- Mount Saikōji

- Location within Hyōgo Prefecture Location within Japan
- Location: Hyōgo Prefecture, Japan
- Coordinates: 34.95°N 135.05°E
- Area: 88.50 km^{2} (34.17 sq mi)
- Established: 27 April 1957

Kiyomizu-Tōjōko-Tachikui Prefectural Natural Park (清水東条湖立杭県立自然公園, Kiyomizu-Tōjōko-Tachikui kenritsu shizen kōen) is a Prefectural Natural Park in central Hyōgo Prefecture, Japan. Established in 1957, the park spans the municipalities of Katō, Nishiwaki, Sanda, and Sasayama. Designation of the park helps protect the habitat of the Japanese giant salamander (Special Natural Monument), kitsune, and tanuki.

== See also ==
- National Parks of Japan
