= Greenhill Stadium =

Baseball stadium in Kato, Japan

- Greenhill
- Location: 1091-1, Takaoka, Katō, Hyōgo, Japan
- Owner: Katō, Hyōgo
- Operator: Katō, Hyōgo
- Capacity: 450
- Field size: Left: 90.0 m (295.3 ft); Center: 120.0 m (393.7 ft); Right: 90.0 m (295.3 ft)

Construction
- Opened: April 26, 1992
- Cost: ¥ 3.1 billion

Greenhill Stadium（グリーンヒル・スタジアム）is a baseball stadium in Katō, Hyōgo, Japan.It is currently used mostly for baseball and softball matches. The stadium was built in 1992.
