= Takino Station =

Railway station in Katō, Hyōgo Prefecture, Japan

Takino Station 滝野駅
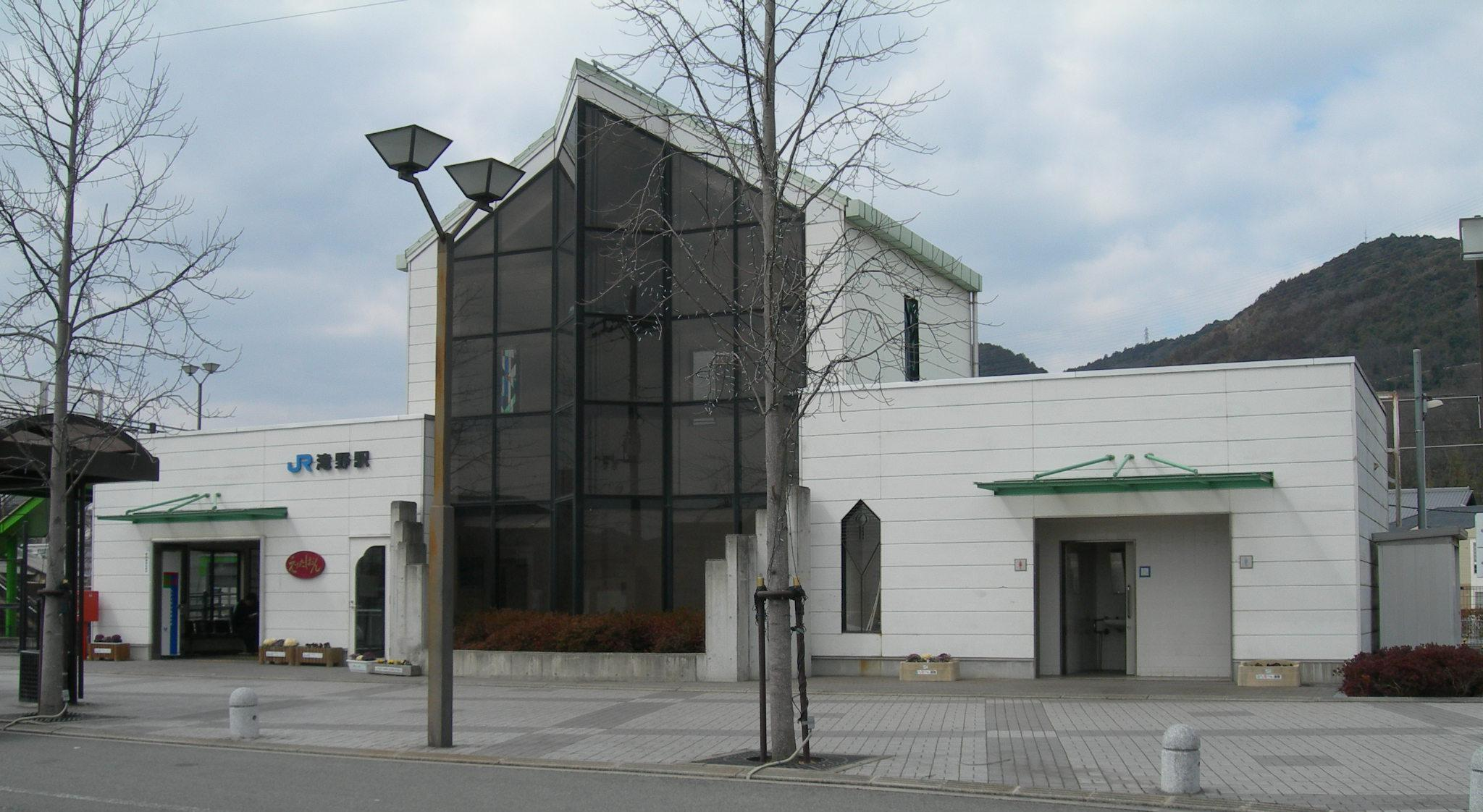
- Takino Station in March 2008

General information
- Location: Kamitakino-chō, Katō-shi, Hyōgo-ken 679-0211; Japan
- Coordinates: 34.9406°N 134.9545°E
- Operator: JR West
- Line: I Kakogawa Line
- Distance: 27.3 km (17.0 miles) from Kakogawa
- Platforms: 1 side platform
- Connections: Bus stop

Other information
- Status: Unstaffed
- Website: Official website

History
- Opened: 1 September 1913
- Former names: Bantetsu-Takino Station (to 1943)

Passengers
- FY2019: 265 daily

Services
Preceding station	JR West	Following station
Yashirocho towards Kakogawa	Kakogawa Line Local	Taki towards Tanikawa
Location
- Location within Hyōgo Prefecture Location within Japan

Takino Station (滝野駅, Takino-eki) is a passenger railway station located in the city of Katō, Hyōgo Prefecture, Japan, operated by West Japan Railway Company (JR West).

== Lines ==
Takino Station is served by the Kakogawa Line and is 27.3 kilometers from the terminus of the line at Kakogawa

== Station layout ==
The station consists of one ground-level side platform serving bi-directional track. The station is unattended.

== History ==
Takino Station opened on 1 September 1913 as Bantetsu-Takino Station (播鉄滝野駅). It was renamed it its present name when the line was nationalized on 1 June 1943. With the privatization of the Japan National Railways (JNR) on 1 April 1987, the station came under the aegis of the West Japan Railway Company.

== Passenger statistics ==
In fiscal 2019, the station was used by an average of 265 passengers daily

== Surrounding area ==
- Toryunada Rapids
- Komyo-ji
- Hyogo Prefectural Harima Central Park

== See also ==
- List of railway stations in Japan
