= Yashiro, Hyōgo =

Dissolved municipality in Katō district, Hyōgo prefecture, Japan

Yashiro (社町, Yashiro-chō) was a town located in Katō District, Hyōgo Prefecture, Japan.

As of 2003, the town had an estimated population of 21,409 and a density of 244.95 persons per km^{2}. The total area was 87.40 km^{2}.

On March 20, 2006, Yashiro, along with the towns of Takino and Tōjō (all from Katō District), was merged to create the city of Katō.

Yashiro was the Japanese sister city of Olympia, Washington.
