= Tōjō, Hyōgo =

Dissolved municipality in Katō district, Hyōgo prefecture, Japan

Tōjō (東条町, Tōjō-chō) was a town located in Katō District, Hyōgo Prefecture, Japan.

As of 2003, the town has an estimated population of 7,263 and a density of 144.34 persons per km^{2}. The total area is 50.32 km^{2}.

On March 20, 2006, Tōjō, along with the towns of Takino and Yashiro (all from Katō District), was merged to create the city of Katō.
