= Takino, Hyōgo =

Dissolved municipality in Katō district, Hyōgo prefecture, Japan

Takino (滝野町, Takino-chō) was a town located in Katō District, Hyōgo Prefecture, Japan.

As of 2003, the town had an estimated population of 11,807 and a density of 597.22 persons per km^{2}. The total area was 19.77 km^{2}.

On March 20, 2006, Takino, along with the towns of Tōjō and Yashiro (all from Katō District), was merged to create the city of Katō.

Takino's former sister city was Hollister, California.
