= Keiji Shibazaki =

Japanese admiral (1894–1943)

- 柴崎 恵次
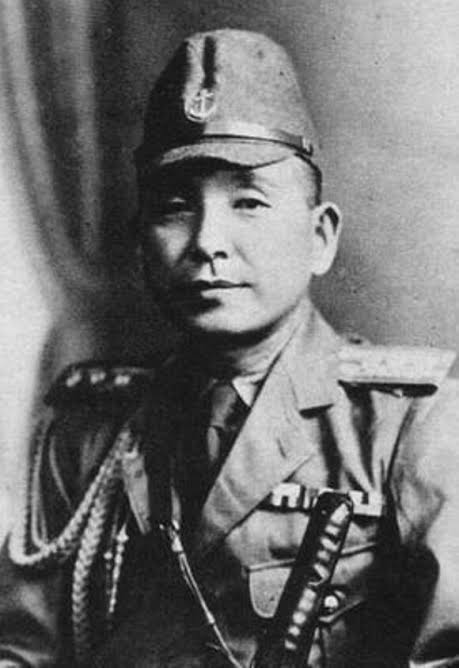
- Born: 9 May 1894; Kasai, Hyōgo, Japan
- Died: 20 November 1943 (aged 49); Tarawa, Kiribati
- Education: Imperial Japanese Naval Academy
- Military career
- Allegiance: Empire of Japan
- Branch: Imperial Japanese Navy
- Service years: 1915–1943
- Rank: Rear Admiral; Vice Admiral (posthumous)
- Units: Azuma, Settsu, Satsuma, Yakumo, Chikuma, Kaba, Yamashiro, Tachikaze, Kamoi, Musashi
- Commands: Ataka; Tarawa garrison
- Conflicts: Second Sino-Japanese War; World War II; Battle of Tarawa †
- Other work: Aide-de-camp to Prince Kuni Asaakira

Keiji Shibazaki (柴崎 恵次, Shibazaki Keiji; 9 April 1894 – 20 November 1943) was a rear admiral in the Imperial Japanese Navy. He was the commander of the Japanese garrison on the island of Betio of the Tarawa atoll during World War II. Shibazaki and all his senior officers were killed by naval gunfire on the first day of the Battle of Tarawa. He was posthumously promoted to vice-admiral.

== Biography ==
Shibazaki was born in Kasai, Hyōgo Prefecture. He was a graduate of the 43rd class of the Imperial Japanese Naval Academy in 1915, ranking 26th out of 95 cadets. He served as midshipman on the cruiser Azuma and battleship Settsu. As a Kaigun Shōi (ensign), he was assigned to the battleship Satsuma and cruiser Yakumo. As a Kaigun Chūi (lieutenant junior grade), he served on the cruiser Chikuma, destroyer Kaba and battleship Yamashiro.

Shibazaki was promoted to Kaigun Taii (lieutenant) in 1921, and after taking courses in navigation, was assigned as chief navigator to the destroyer Tachikaze, oiler Kamoi and survey ship Musashi. After his promotion to Kaigun Shōsa (lieutenant-commander) in 1927, he was appointed aide-de-camp to Prince Kuni Asaakira from 1932 to 1933. In 1936, he received his first command, the gunboat Ataka. Promoted to Kaigun Taisa (captain) in 1937, he served in various staff positions, primarily in Kure and in Shanghai.

Shibazaki was promoted to Kaigun Shōshō (rear admiral) on 1 May 1943. He arrived on Betio in Tarawa in September 1943 to take command of the Japanese garrison, including 1,122 naval infantry in the 3rd Special Base Force (a reorganized of the 6th Yokosuka SNLF), 1,497 sailors forming the 7th Sasebo Special Naval Landing Force, and 1,427 (mostly Korean and Chinese) laborers forming the 111th Pioneers construction unit, and a detachment of 970 laborers from the 4th Fleet Construction Unit.

Shibazaki was a veteran of amphibious landings in China during the late 1930s and was aware of the difficulties facing an amphibious landing force. He built extensive defenses on Betio to defend its strategically important airfield, and famously boasted to his troops that "it would take one million men one hundred years" to conquer the island.

Shibazaki was killed in action on the first day of the Battle of Tarawa, sometime during the mid-afternoon of 20 November 1943. Reportedly, he and all his senior officers were killed by 5" naval gunfire (airbursts) from a United States Navy destroyer, either USS Dashiell or USS Ringgold, after the men were spotted walking to a secondary command post away from the front lines on the beaches. Shibazaki was posthumously promoted to vice-admiral.
