= Katō District, Hyōgo =

Former district in Hyōgo prefecture, Japan

Katō (加東郡, Katō-gun) was a district located in Hyōgo Prefecture, Japan.

As of 2008, the district had an estimated population of 40,334 and a density of 257.03 persons per km^{2}. The total area was 157.49 km^{2}.

== Former towns and villages ==
- Takino
- Tōjō
- Yashiro

== Merger ==
- On March 20, 2006 - the towns of Takino, Tōjō and Yashiro were merged to create the city of Katō. Katō District was dissolved as a result of this merger.
