= Taki Station (Hyōgo) =

Railway station in Katō, Hyōgo Prefecture, Japan

Taki Station 滝駅
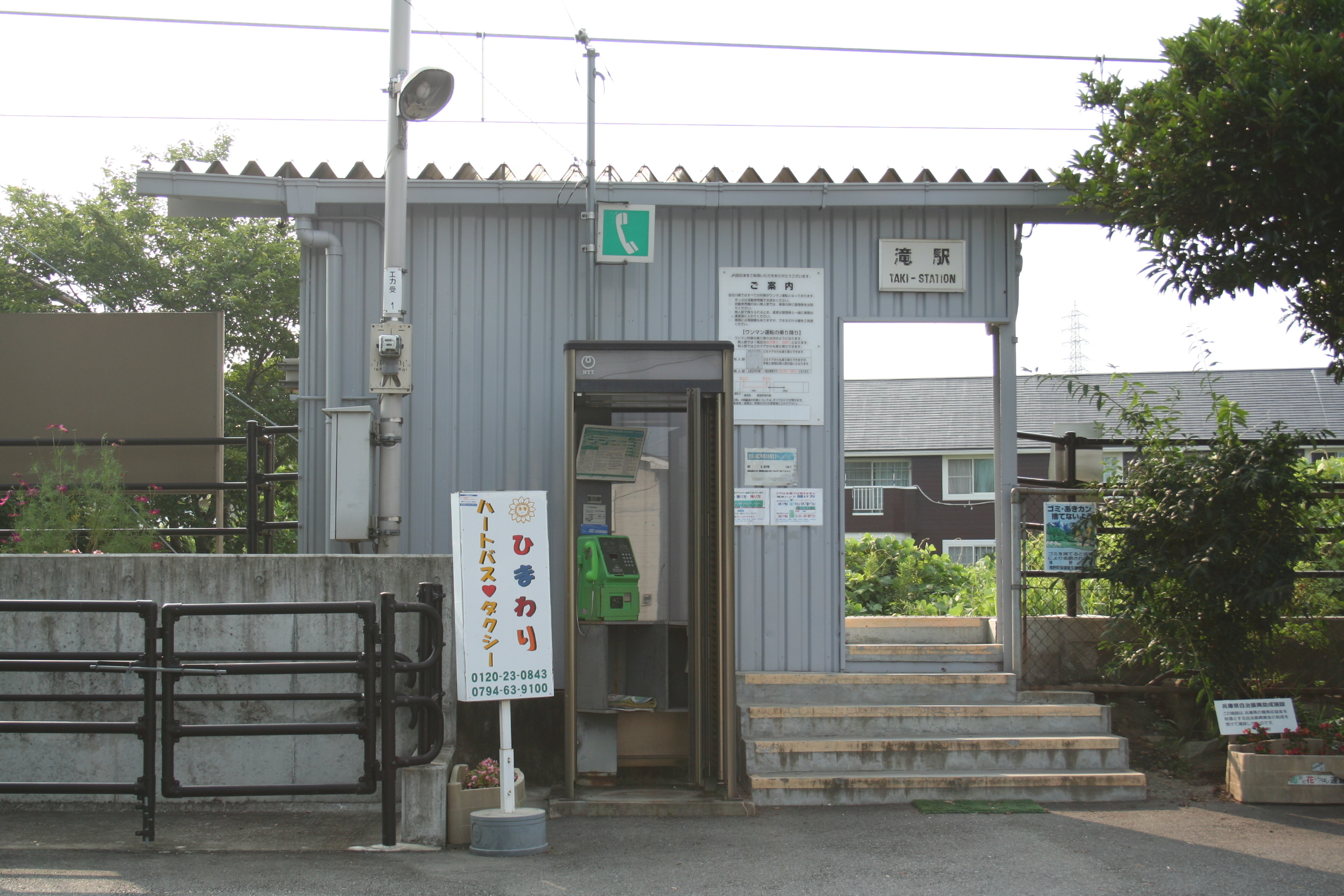
- Taki Station building in July 2010

General information
- Location: Kamitaniko, Katō-shi, Hyōgo-ken 679-0211; Japan
- Coordinates: 34°56′55″N 134°57′45″E
- Operator: JR West
- Line: I Kakogawa Line
- Distance: 28.4 km (17.6 miles) from Kakogawa
- Platforms: 1 side platform
- Connections: Bus stop

Other information
- Status: Unstaffed
- Website: Official website

History
- Opened: 10 August 1913
- Former names: Takino Station (to 1943)

Passengers
- FY2019: 54 daily

Services
Preceding station	JR West	Following station
Takino towards Kakogawa	Kakogawa Line Local	Nishiwakishi towards Tanikawa
Location
- Location within Hyōgo Prefecture Location within Japan

Taki Station (滝駅, Taki-eki) is a passenger railway station located in the city of Katō, Hyōgo Prefecture, Japan, operated by West Japan Railway Company (JR West).

== Lines ==
Taki Station is served by the Kakogawa Line and is 28.4 kilometers from the terminus of the line at Kakogawa

== Station layout ==
The station consists of one ground-level side platform serving a single bi-directional track. The station is unattended.

== History ==
Taki Station opened on 10 August 1913 as Takino Station (仮滝野駅); however only two weeks later, on 28 August, it was reduced to a provisional stop and was abolished on 1 January 1914. It reopened 1 May 1914 and was further reduced in status to that of a seasonal provisional stop on 9 May 1921. It became a full passenger station on 1 June 1943. With the privatization of the Japan National Railways (JNR) on 1 April 1987, the station came under the aegis of the West Japan Railway Company.

== Passenger statistics ==
In fiscal 2019, the station was used by an average of 54 passengers daily

== Surrounding area ==
- Toryudana Rapids

== See also ==
- List of railway stations in Japan
