= List of mergers in Hyōgo Prefecture =

Here is a list of mergers in Hyōgo Prefecture, Japan since the Heisei era.

== Mergers from April 1, 1999 to Present ==
- On April 1, 1999 - The former town of Sasayama absorbed the towns of Konda, Nishiki and Tannan (all from Taki District) to create the city of Tamba-Sasayama. Taki District was dissolved as a result of this merger. (Merger Information Page)
- On April 1, 2004 - The former town of Yabu absorbed towns of Oya, Sekinomiya and Yoka (all from Yabu District) to create the city of Yabu. Yabu District was dissolved as a result of this merger.
- On November 1, 2004 - The towns of Aogaki, Hikami, Ichijima, Kaibara, Kasuga and Sannan (all from Hikami District) were merged to create the city of Tamba. Hikami District was dissolved as a result of this merger.
- On January 11, 2005 - The towns of Midori, Mihara, Nandan and Seidan (all from Mihara District) were merged to create the city of Minamiawaji. Mihara District was dissolved as a result of this merger.
- On April 1, 2005 - The former town of Awaji absorbed the towns of Higashiura, Hokudan, Ichinomiya and Tsuna (all from Tsuna District) to create the city of Awaji.
- On April 1, 2005 - The former town of Asago absorbed the towns of Ikuno, Santō and Wadayama (all from Asago District) to create the city of Asago. Asago District was dissolved as a result of this merger. (Merger Information Page)
- On April 1, 2005 - The old city of Toyooka absorbed the towns of Hidaka, Kinosaki and Takeno (all from Kinosaki District), and the towns of Izushi and Tantō (both from Izushi District) to create the new and expanded city of Toyooka. Izushi District was dissolved as a result of this merger.
- On April 1, 2005 - The town of Kasumi (from Kinosaki District), and the towns of Mikata and Muraoka (both from Mikata District) were merged to create the town of Kami (in Mikata District). Kinosaki District was dissolved as a result of this merger.
- On April 1, 2005 - The towns of Chikusa, Haga, Ichinomiya and Yamasaki (all from Shisō District) were merged to create the city of Shisō.
- On October 1, 2005 - The towns of Hamasaka and Onsen (both from Mikata District) were merged to create the town of Shin'onsen.
- On October 1, 2005 - The towns of Kōzuki, Mikazuki and Nankō (all from Sayō District) were merged into the expanded town of Sayō.
- On October 1, 2005 - The town of Kurodashō (from Taka District) was merged into the expanded city of Nishiwaki.
- On October 1, 2005 - The old city of Tatsuno (龍野) absorbed the towns of Ibogawa, Mitsu and Shingū (all from Ibo District) to create the new and expanded city of Tatsuno (たつの). Tatsuno's written name changed from kanji (龍野) to hiragana (たつの) with this merger.
- On October 24, 2005 - The town of Yokawa (from Mino District) was merged into the expanded city of Miki. Mino District was dissolved as a result of this merger.
- On November 1, 2005 - The towns of Kami, Naka and Yachiyo (all from Taka District) were merged to create the town of Taka.
- On November 7, 2005 - The towns of Kanzaki and Ōkawachi (both from Kanzaki District) were merged to create the town of Kamikawa.
- On February 11, 2006 - The town of Goshiki (from Tsuna District) was merged into the expanded city of Sumoto. Tsuna District was dissolved as a result of this merger.
- On March 20, 2006 - The towns of Takino, Tōjō and Yashiro (all from Katō District) were merged to create the city of Katō. Katō District was dissolved as a result of this merger.
- On March 27, 2006 - The towns of Ieshima and Yumesaki (both from Shikama District), the town of Yasutomi (from Shisō District), and the town of Kōdera (from Kanzaki District) were merged into the expanded city of Himeji. Shikama District and Shisō District were both dissolved as a result of this merger.
