= Kinosaki =

Hot springs area in Hyōgo prefecture, Japan

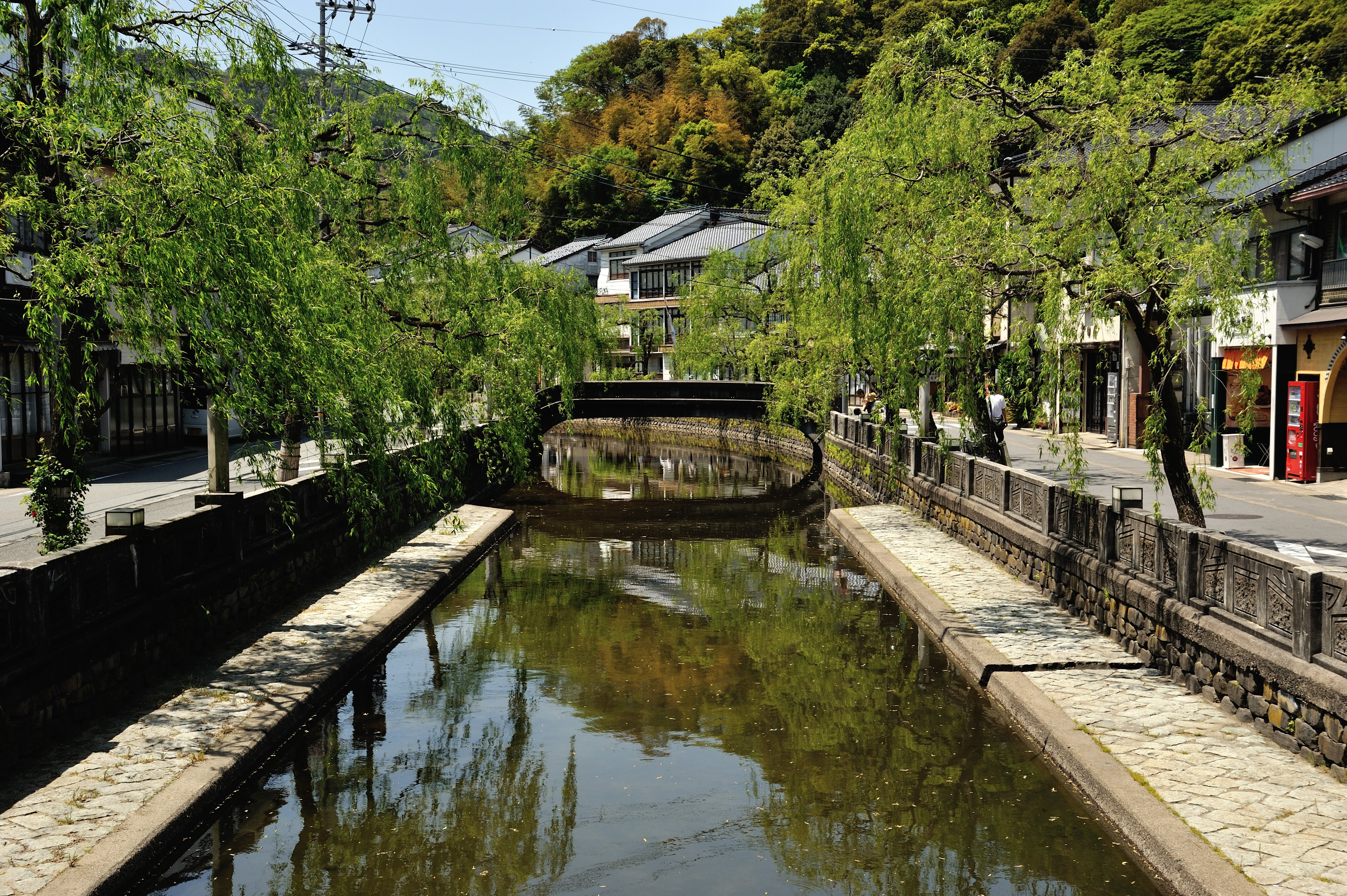
Kinosaki Onsen by day

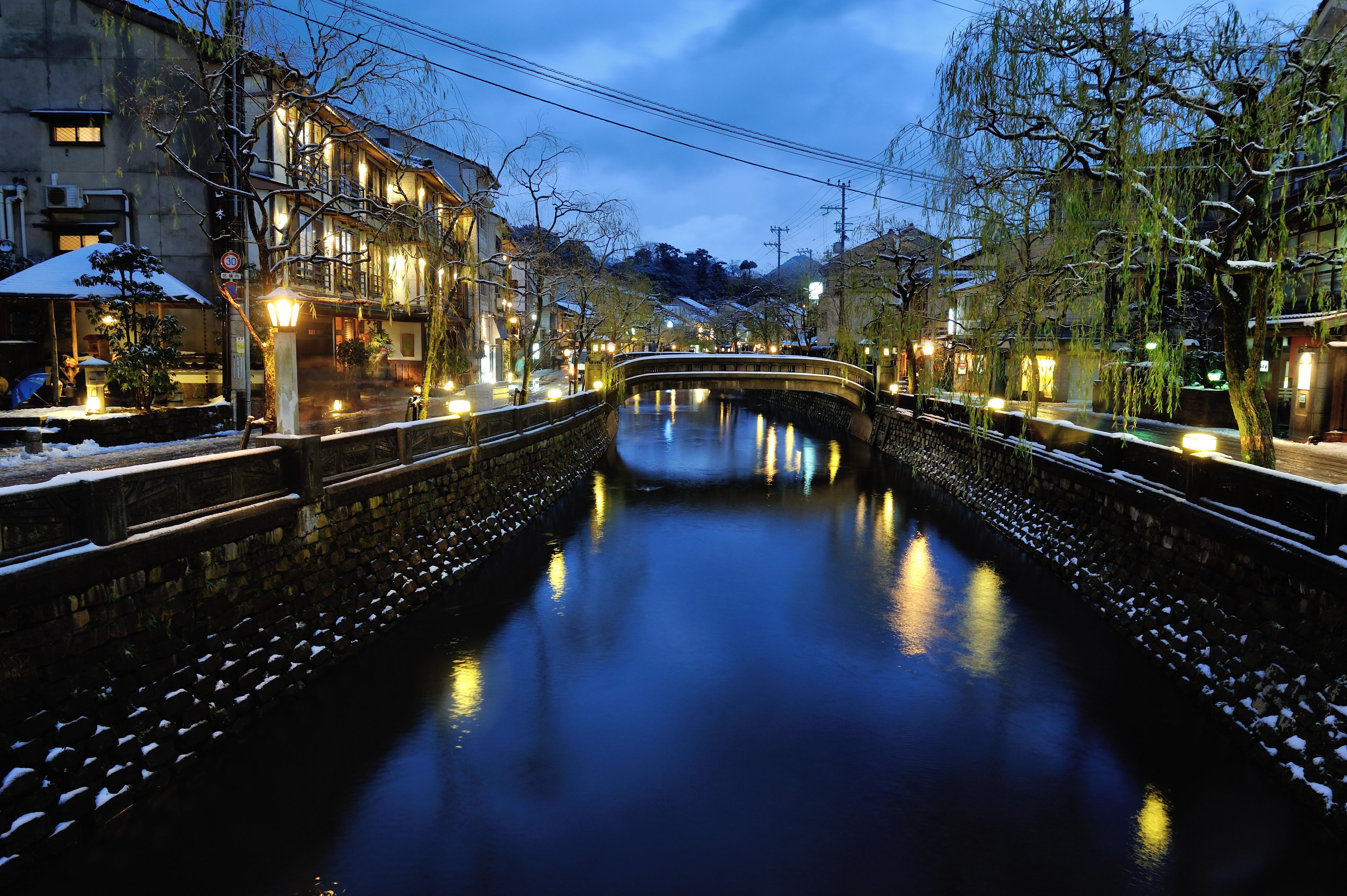
Kinosaki Onsen by night

Kinosaki (城崎町, Kinosaki-chō) was a town in Kinosaki District, Hyōgo Prefecture, Japan.

== Merger ==
On April 1, 2005, Kinosaki, along with the towns of Hidaka and Takeno (all from Kinosaki District), and the towns of Izushi and Tantō (both from Izushi District), were merged into the expanded city of Toyooka and they no longer exist as independent municipalities.

As of 1 October 2010, the Kinosaki district of Toyooka had an estimated population of 3,778.

== Tourism ==
Kinosaki is a resort area, with onsen (Japanese hot springs). The Onsen town has a history of 1,300 years. In 1913, the writer Shiga Naoya came to Kinosaki and stayed there for three weeks. Kinosaki provided the inspiration for his short story, "Kinosaki ni te" or "In Kinosaki".

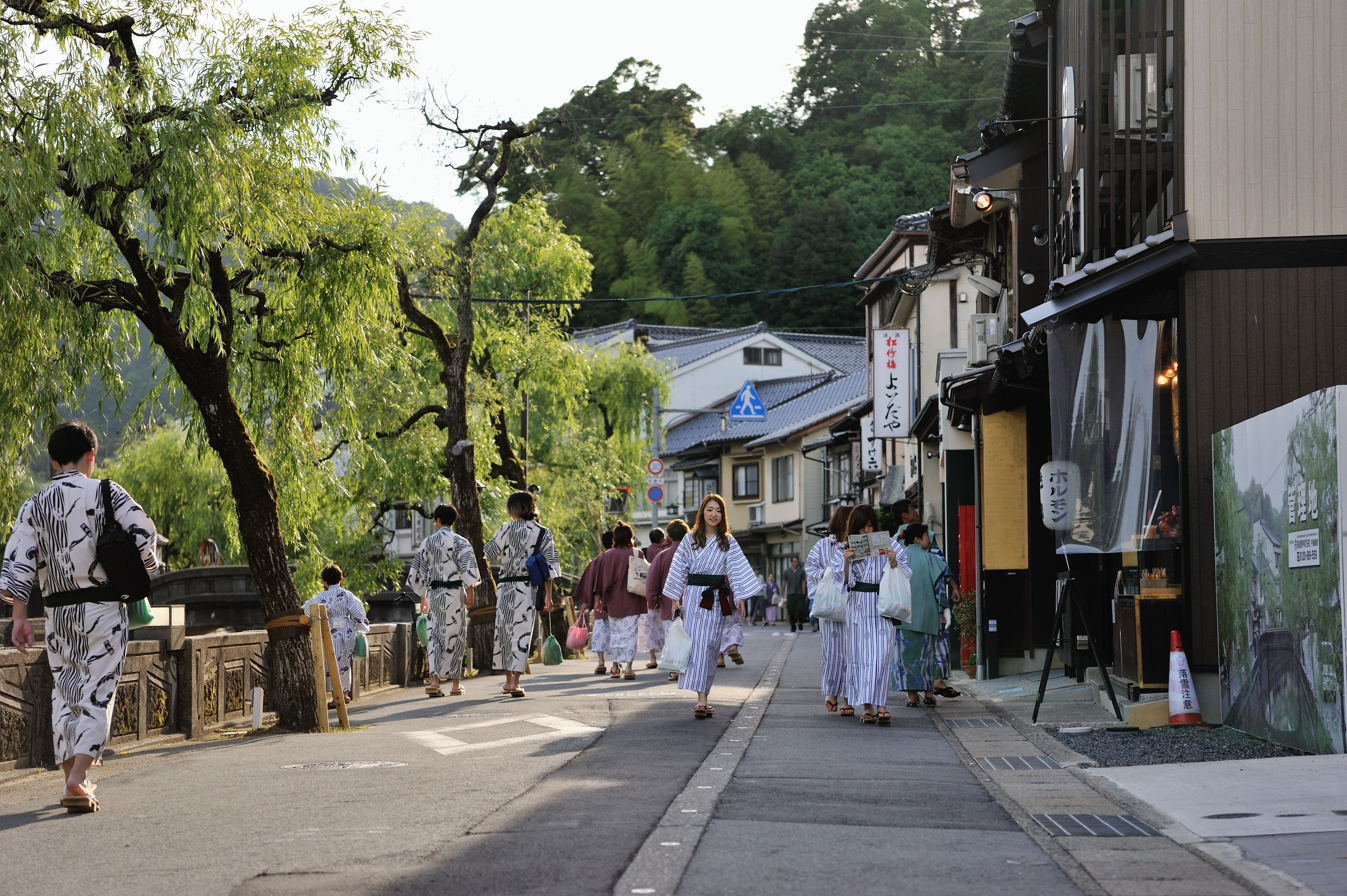
People dressed in yukata, walking along the streets of Kinosaki

=== Onsen Resort ===
There are seven public onsen bath houses in Kinosaki Onsen:

- Kouno-yu
- Mandara-yu
- Goshono-yu
- Ichino-yu
- Yanagi-yu
- Jizou-yu
- Satono-yu

Tourists staying in many of the ryokans (Japanese traditional inns) in Kinosaki can receive a free pass to all seven. It is common for tourists staying in Kinosaki Onsen to walk around in yukata, this saves them having to change into their own clothes every time they use an onsen. A ropeway at the far end of the street transports visitors to the top of Mt. Taishi, which has views of the town and coastline, as well as a temple appropriately named Onsenji.

=== Museums ===
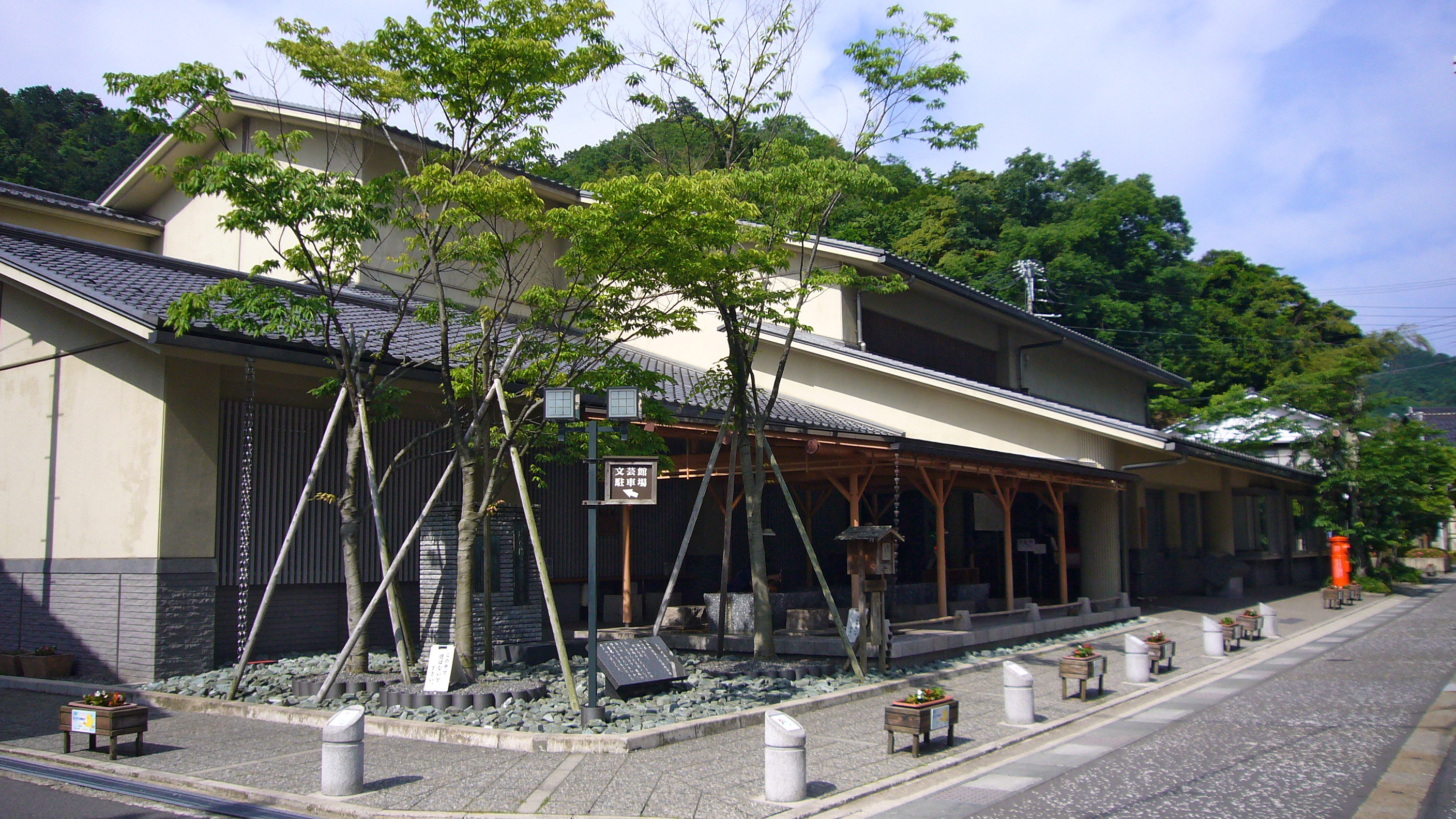
Kinosaki Literary Museum

In addition to the onsens, tourists can visit the Kinosaki Straw Craft Museum where they can participate in a straw craft-making workshop, the Kinosaki Literary Museum to learn about the writers of Kinosaki Onsen, as well as many shops and cafes. Some of the area's specialties in these shops and restaurants include snow crab, Tajima beef, and onsen-boiled eggs.

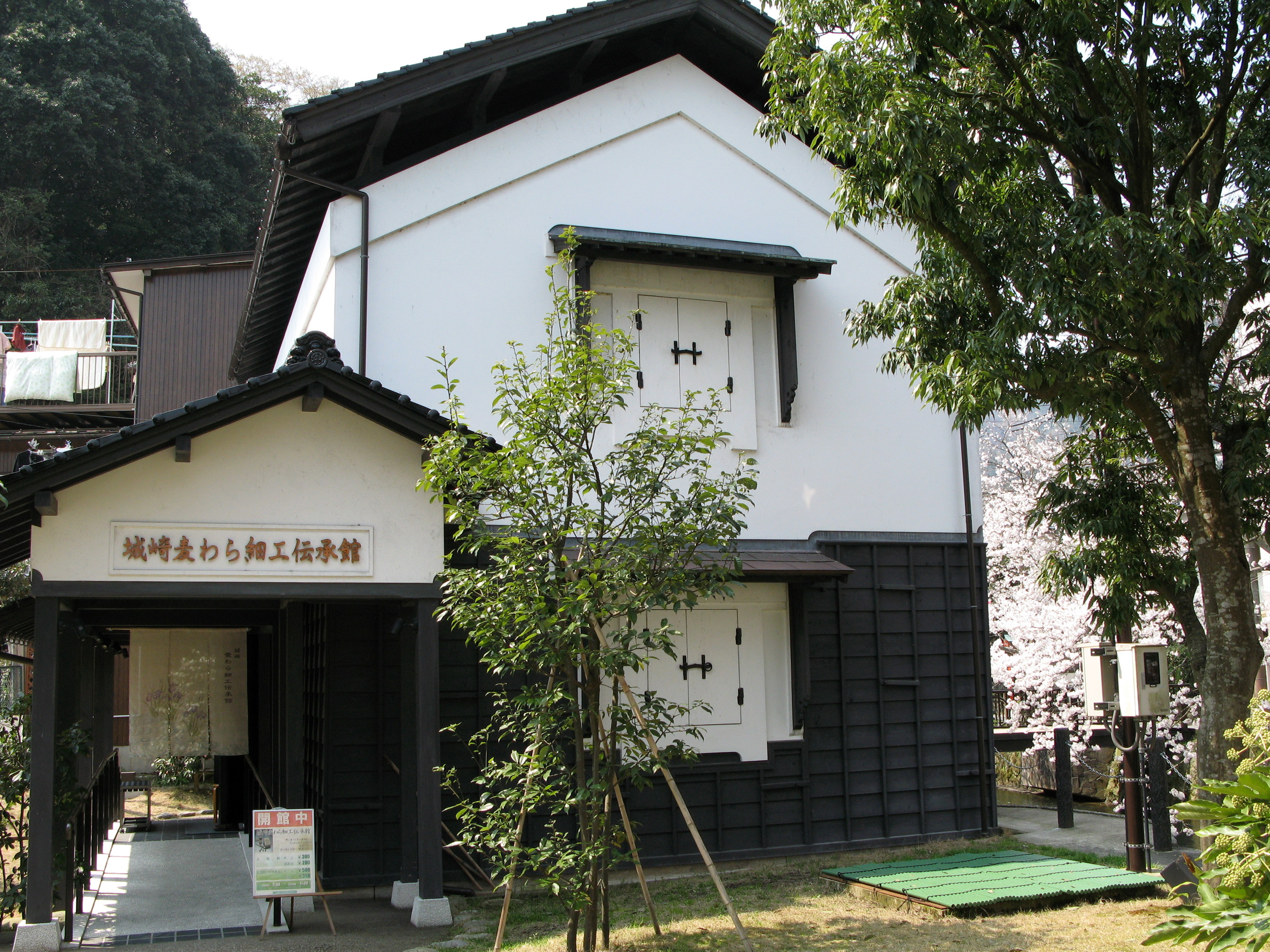
Kinosaki Straw Craft Museum

== Transportation ==
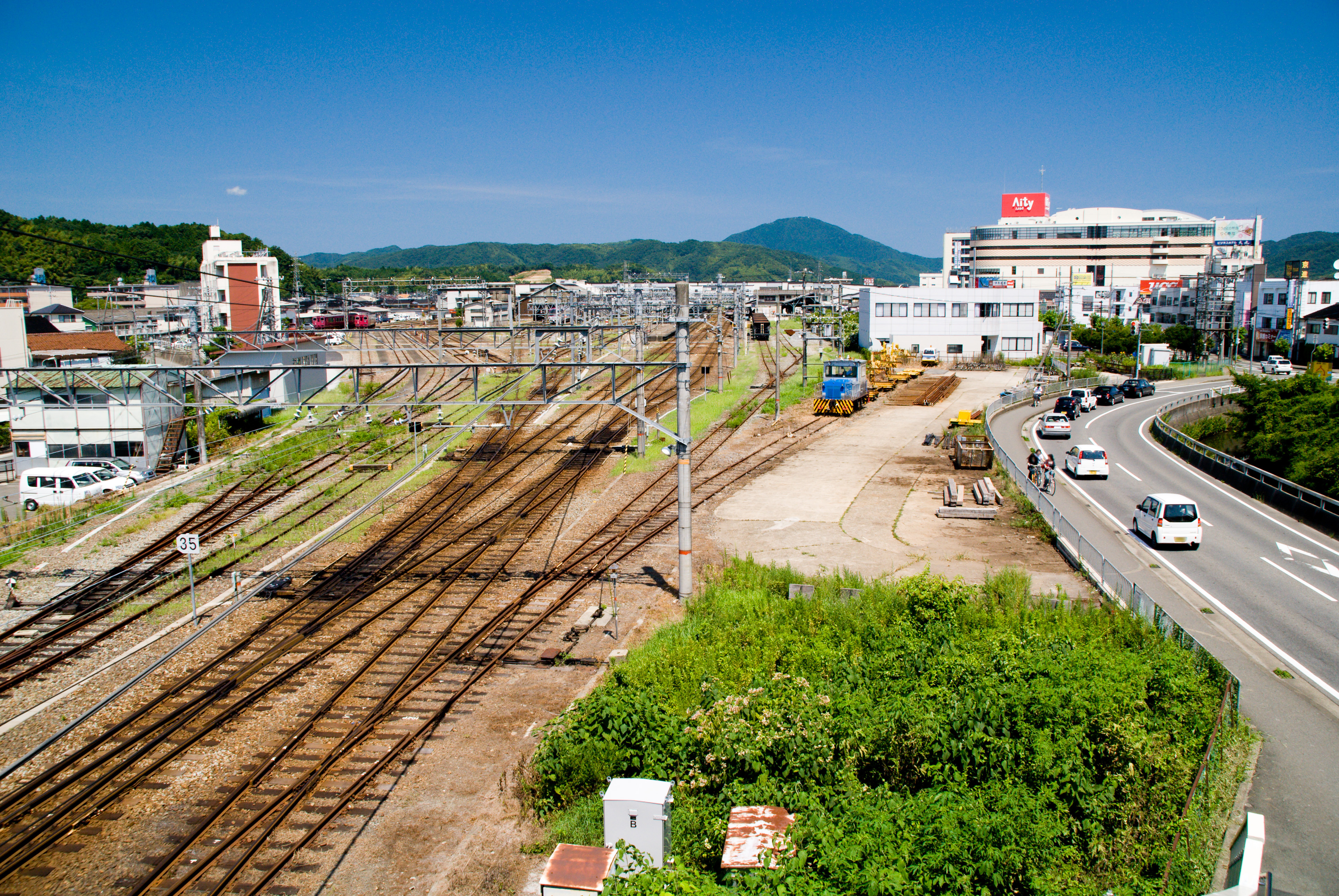
Fukuchiyama branch office of JR West on Toyooka

=== Railway ===
The Sanin Main Line provides a JR rail connection to Kyoto, and direct trains to Osaka are available via Fukuchiyama. Direct Express trains take about 2.5 hours from Osaka to Toyooka. A JR Pass (more specifically, a Kansai WIDE Area Pass) can be purchased to travel from Osaka or Kyoto to Kinosaki.

- JR West - San'in Main Line
  - Ebara - Kokufu - Toyooka - Gembudō - Kinosaki-Onsen - Takeno
- Kyoto Tango Railway - Miyazu Line
  - Toyooka - Kōnotori-no-sato

=== Highways ===
- Japan National Route 178
- Japan National Route 312
- Japan National Route 426
- Japan National Route 482
- Japan National Route 483

=== Airway ===
The Tajima Airport serves Toyooka and runs two direct flights a day to Osaka Itami Airport.

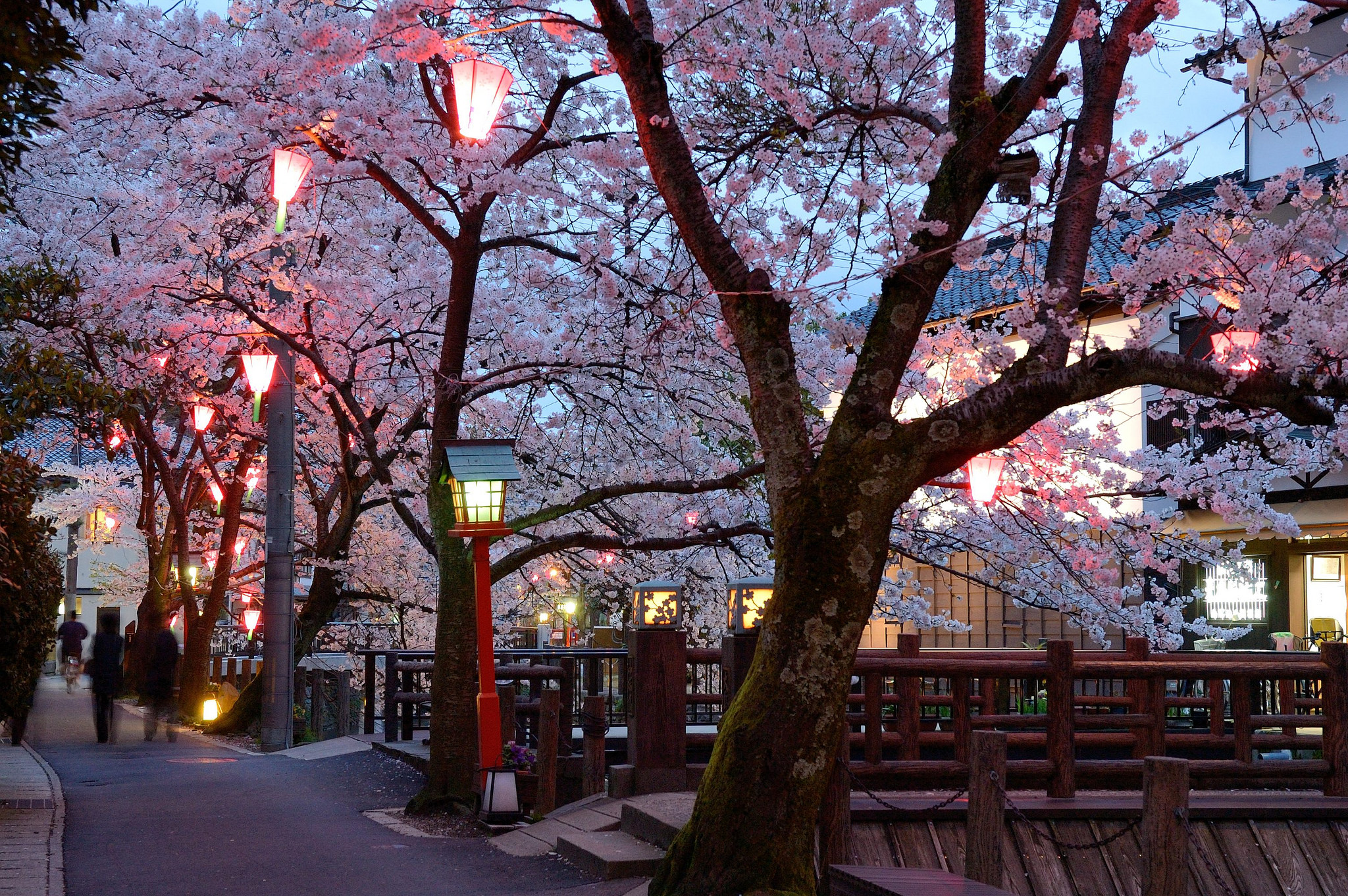
Kinosaki Onsen cherry blossoms

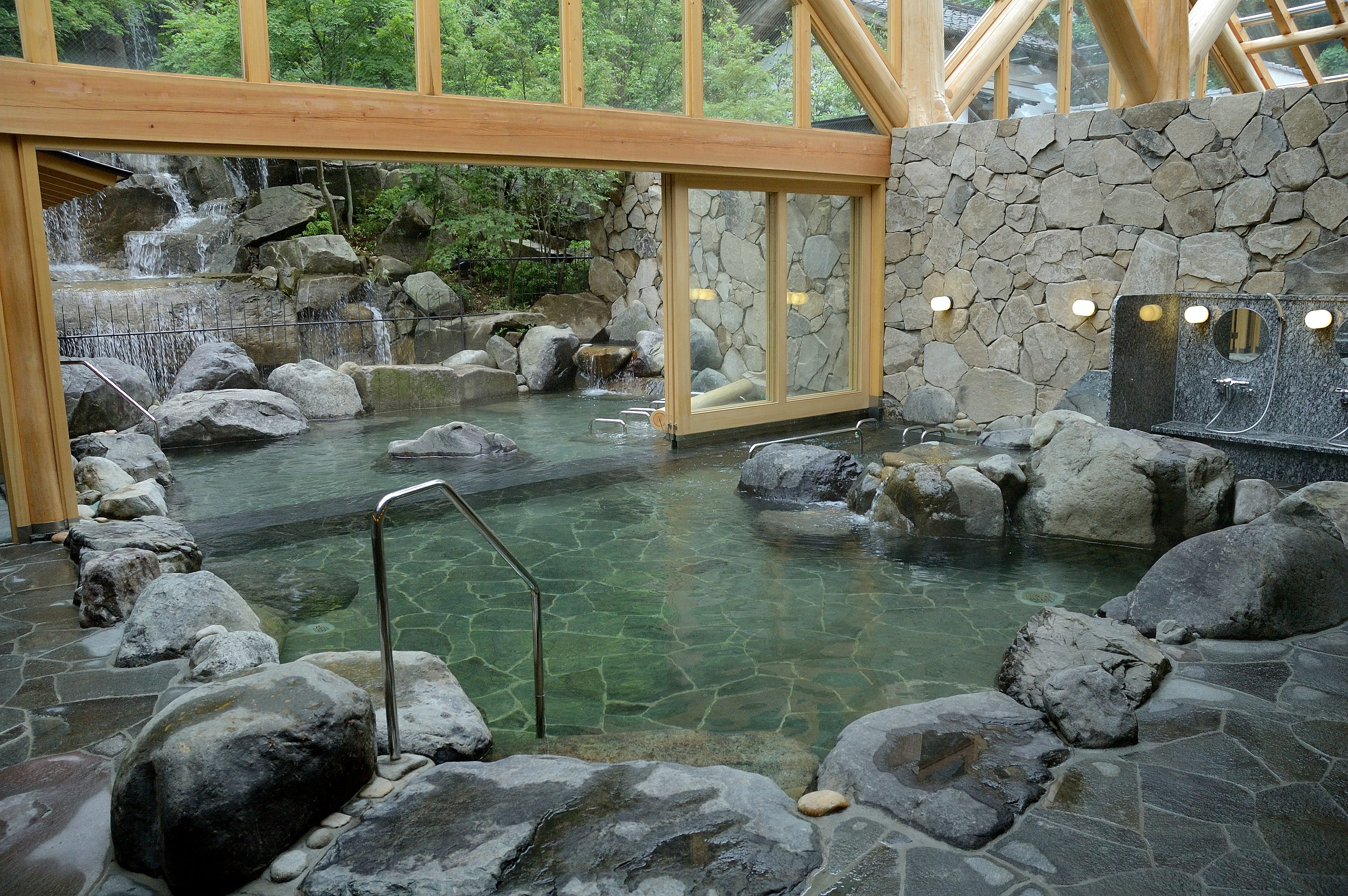
Inside Goshono-yu Kinosaki Onsen

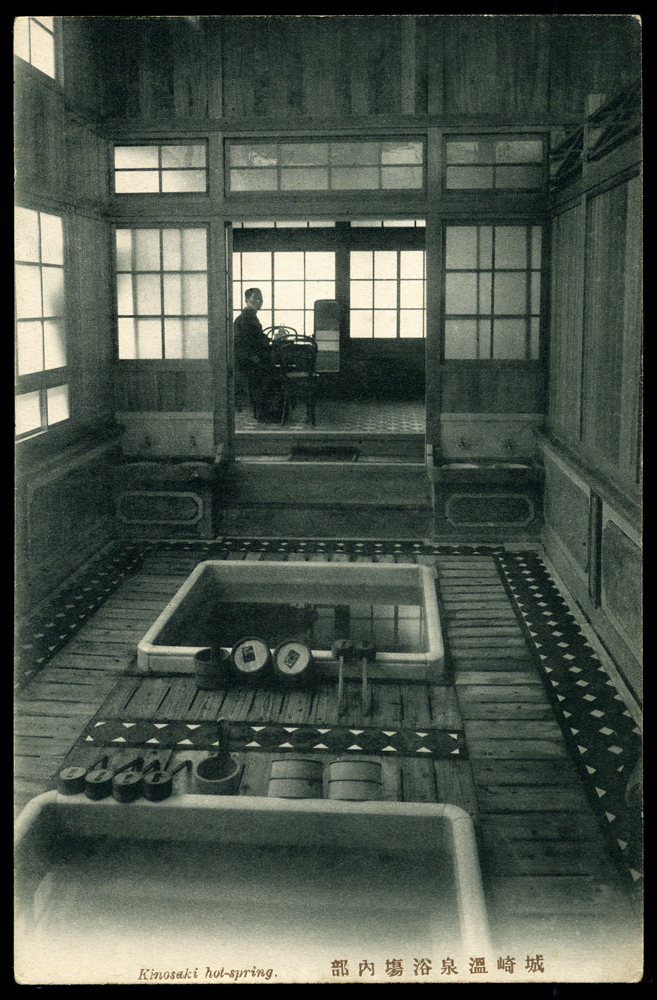
Kinosaki Hot Spring, postcard c. 1910

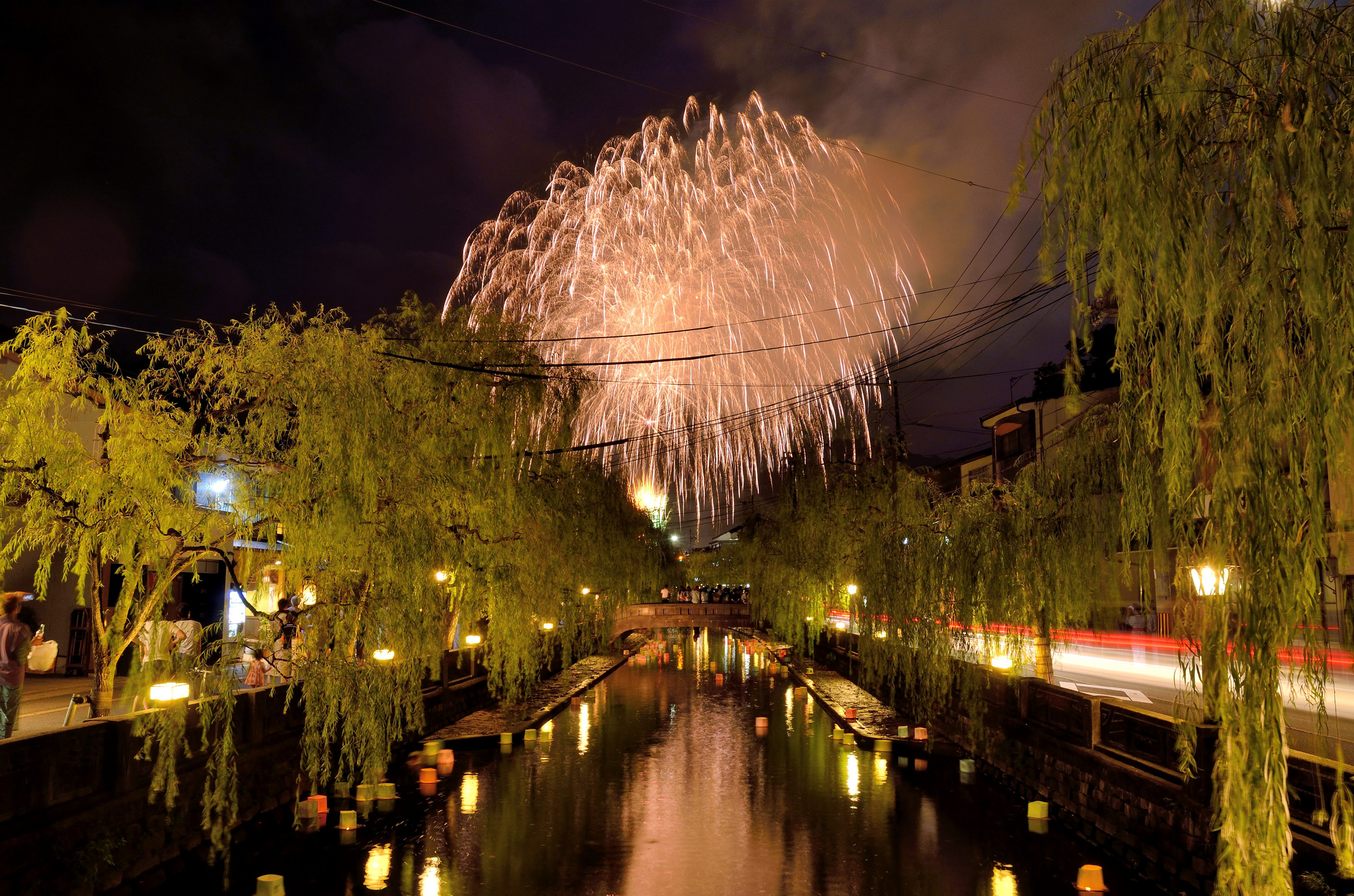
Kinosaki Onsen summer fireworks
