= Toyooka Junior College =

Coordinates: 35°32′09″N 134°48′21″E

- 豊岡短期大学
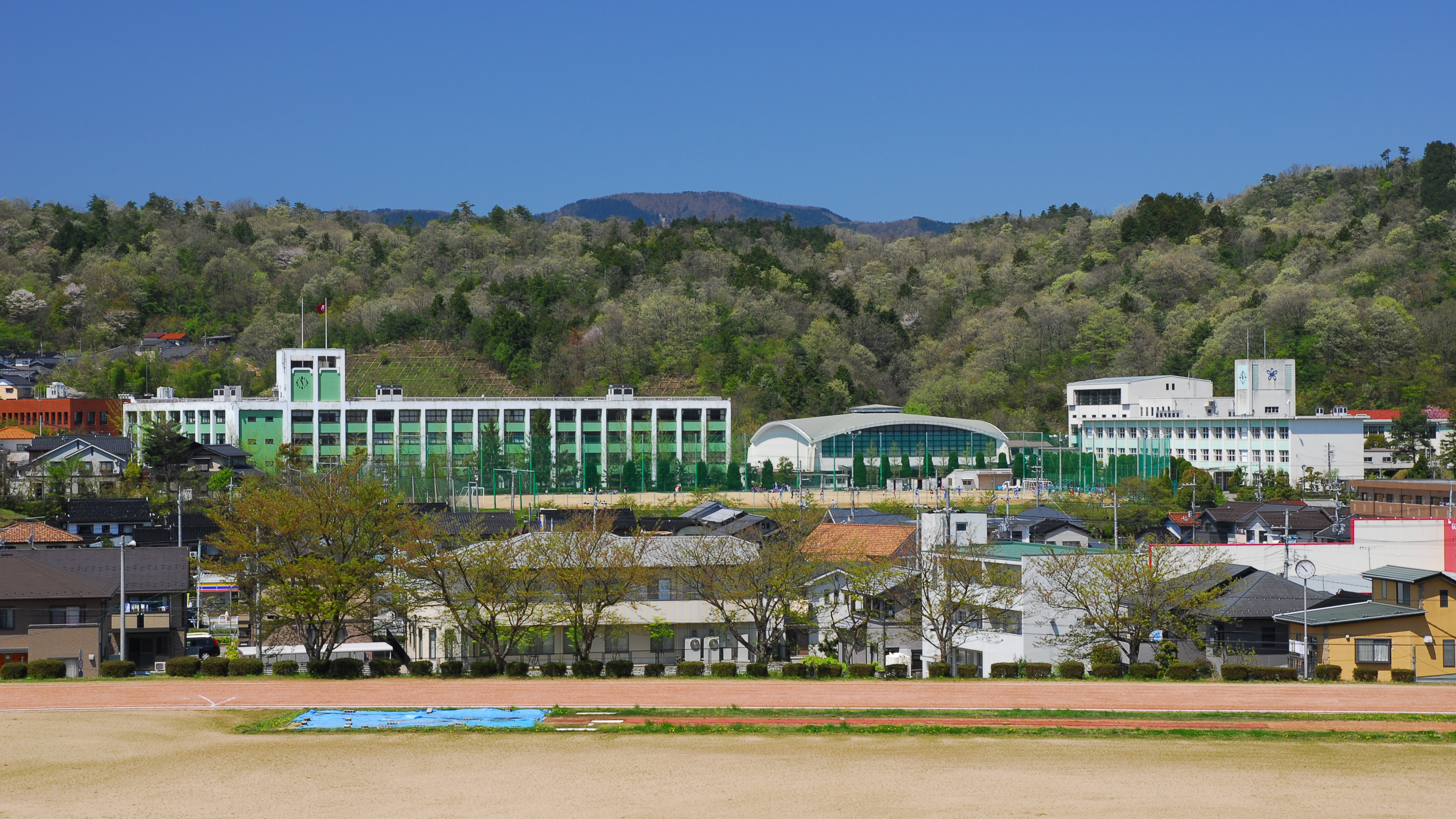
- Type: Private
- Established: 1967
- Location: Toyooka, Hyōgo, Hyōgo, Japan
- Website: https://koutoku.ac.jp/

Toyooka Junior College (豊岡短期大学, Toyooka Tanki Daigaku) is a private junior college in Toyooka, Hyōgo, Japan. The junior college was established as a women's junior college in 1967. It became coeducational in 1989.

== Departments ==
- Department of childcare
