= Tajima Airport =

Regional airport in Hyogo, Japan

Tajima Airport 但馬飛行場
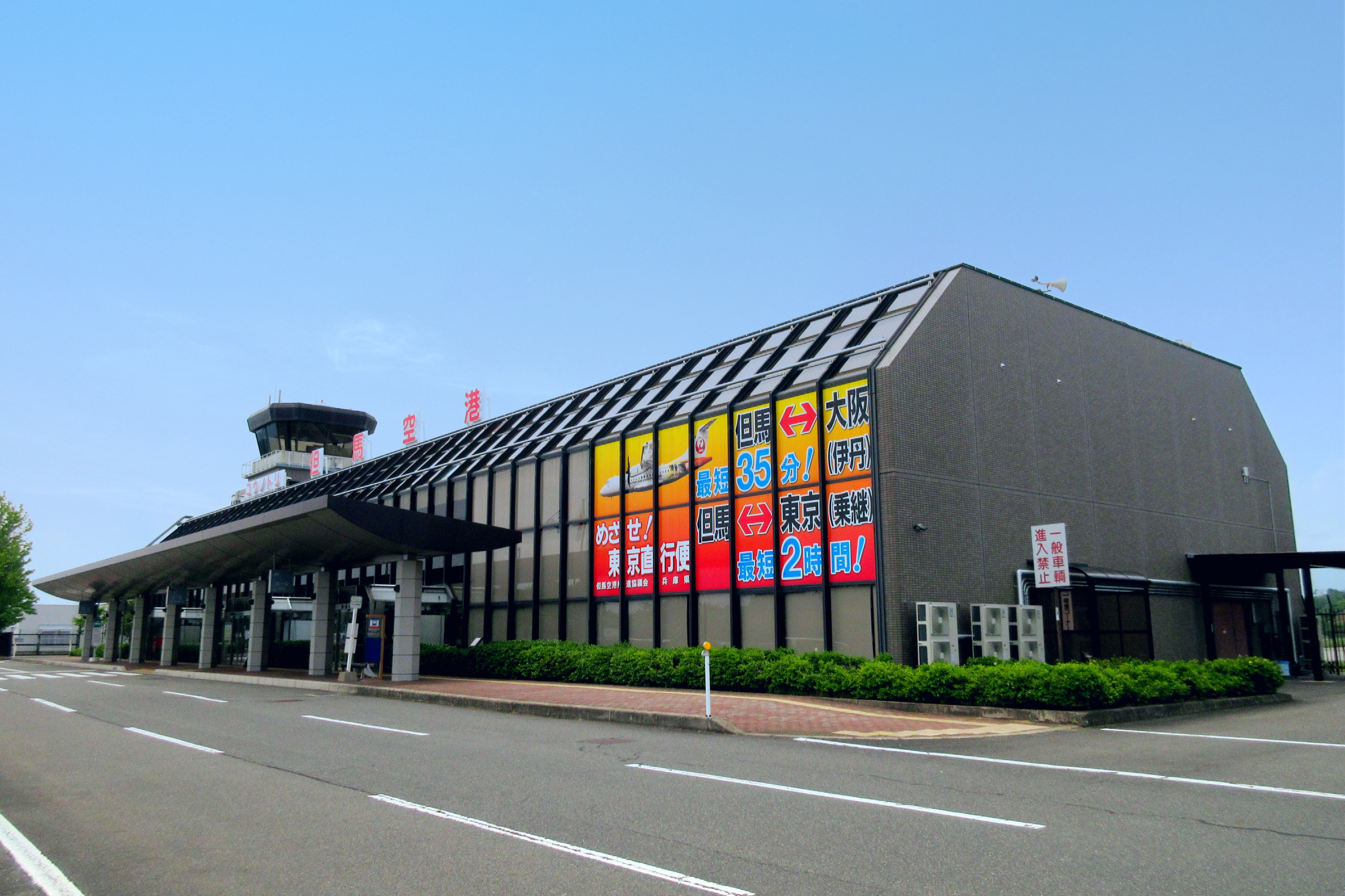
- IATA: TJH; ICAO: RJBT

Summary
- Airport type: Public
- Operator: Government
- Location: Toyooka, Hyogo Prefecture, Japan
- Elevation AMSL: 578 ft / 176 m
- Coordinates: 35°30′46″N 134°47′13″E

Map
- Location in Japan RJBT (Japan)

Runways
Direction	Length		Surface
Direction	m	ft	Surface
01/19	1,200	3,937	Asphalt concrete

Statistics (2015)
- Passengers: 28,632
- Cargo (metric tonnes): 0
- Aircraft movement: 4,397
- Source: Japanese Ministry of Land, Infrastructure, Transport and Tourism

Tajima Airport (但馬飛行場, Tajima Hikōjō; "Tajima Airfield") (IATA: TJH, ICAO: RJBT), also known as Kounotori Tajima Airport (コウノトリ但馬空港, Kounotori Tajima Kūkō) is an airport 2.6 NM (4.8 km; 3.0 mi) southwest of Toyooka, Hyogo Prefecture, Japan.

== History ==
The airport was built during the bubble economy to service the long-distance transport needs of northern Hyogo since this area lacked a motorway and shinkansen. The airport started construction in the late 80s and was finished in 1994, right as Japan's economic crisis was getting into full swing. As such the airport has never managed to attain the predicted passenger numbers and is heavily subsidised by the prefectural government.

The airport's only scheduled service is to Osaka International Airport; as of the summer 2013 timetable, there are two round trips per day. The flight competes with the more frequent Kounotori limited express train for passenger traffic between northern Hyogo and Osaka, and thus mainly attracts connecting traffic from other Japanese cities. Total travel time between Tajima and Tokyo Haneda Airport is from 2 hours 5 minutes to 2 hours 40 minutes, including a 20 to 50 minute connection in Osaka. The government of Hyogo Prefecture lobbied All Nippon Airways for the opening of nonstop service from Tajima to Haneda when additional slots were opened at Haneda in 2011. Various local authorities provide subsidies of up to 6,000 yen for Tajima Airport area residents who take the flight.

=== Accidents and incidents ===
- On July 20, 2009, a helicopter traveling from Yonago Airport to Tajima Airport lost visibility in the midst of a sudden rainy season storm and crashed into a mountain near Tajima Airport, killing the pilot. The crash was ruled to be pilot error in miscalculating the weather en route.
- On July 21, 2013, a small private aircraft overran the runway while landing at Tajima, breaking through a guard rail and crashing into a wooded area nearby. The three occupants were slightly injured and the airport was temporarily closed.

== Airlines and destinations ==
Airlines	Destinations
Japan Air Commuter	Osaka–Itami
