= Gembudō Station =

Railway station in Toyooka, Hyōgo Prefecture, Japan

Gembudō Station 玄武洞駅
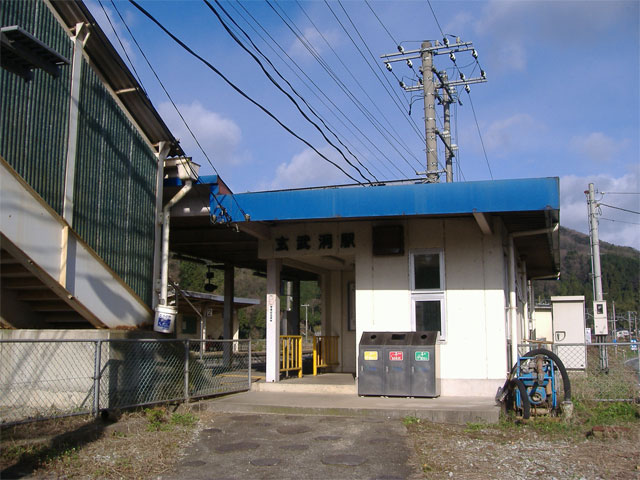
- Gembudō Station, October 2007

General information
- Location: Kinosakicho Uyama, Toyooka-shi, Hyōgo-ken 669-6116; Japan
- Coordinates: 35°35′19″N 134°47′58″E
- Owner: West Japan Railway Company
- Operator: West Japan Railway Company
- Line: San'in Main Line
- Distance: 153.7 km (95.5 miles) from Kyoto
- Platforms: 2 side platforms
- Connections: Bus stop

Other information
- Status: Unstaffed
- Website: Official website

History
- Opened: 21 April 1918

Passengers
- FY 2023: 40 daily
Location
- Location within Hyōgo Prefecture Location within Japan

Gembudō Station (玄武洞駅, Genbudō-eki) is a passenger railway station located in the city of Toyooka, Hyōgo Prefecture, Japan, operated by West Japan Railway Company (JR West).

== Lines ==
Gembudō Station is served by the San'in Main Line, and is located 153.7 kilometers from the terminus of the line at Kyoto.

== Station layout ==
The station consists of two ground-level opposed side platforms connected by a footbridge. The station is unattended.

=== Platforms ===
1	■ San'in Main Line	for Toyooka, Kyoto and Osaka
2	■ San'in Main Line	for Kinosaki Onsen and Tottori

== Adjacent stations ==
«	Service	»
West Japan Railway Company (JR West) Sanin Main Line
Limited Express Hamakaze: Does not stop at this station
Limited Express Kounotori: Does not stop at this station
Limited Express Kinosaki: Does not stop at this station
Toyooka	Local	Kinosakionsen
Toyooka	Rapid	Kinosakionsen

== History ==
Gembudō Station opened as a provisional stop on March 2, 1912 and was elevated to a full passenger station on April 21, 1918. With the privatization of the Japan National Railways (JNR) on April 1, 1987, the station came under the aegis of the West Japan Railway Company.

== Passenger statistics ==
In fiscal 2016, the station was used by an average of 32 passengers daily

== Surrounding area ==
- Gembudō caves

== See also ==
- List of railway stations in Japan
