= Toyooka =

Toyooka 豊岡市
- City
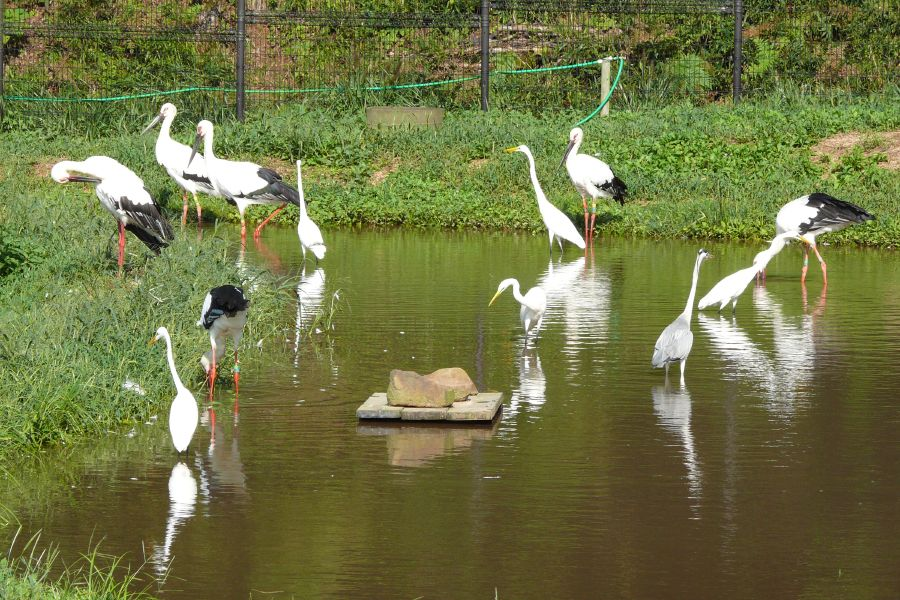
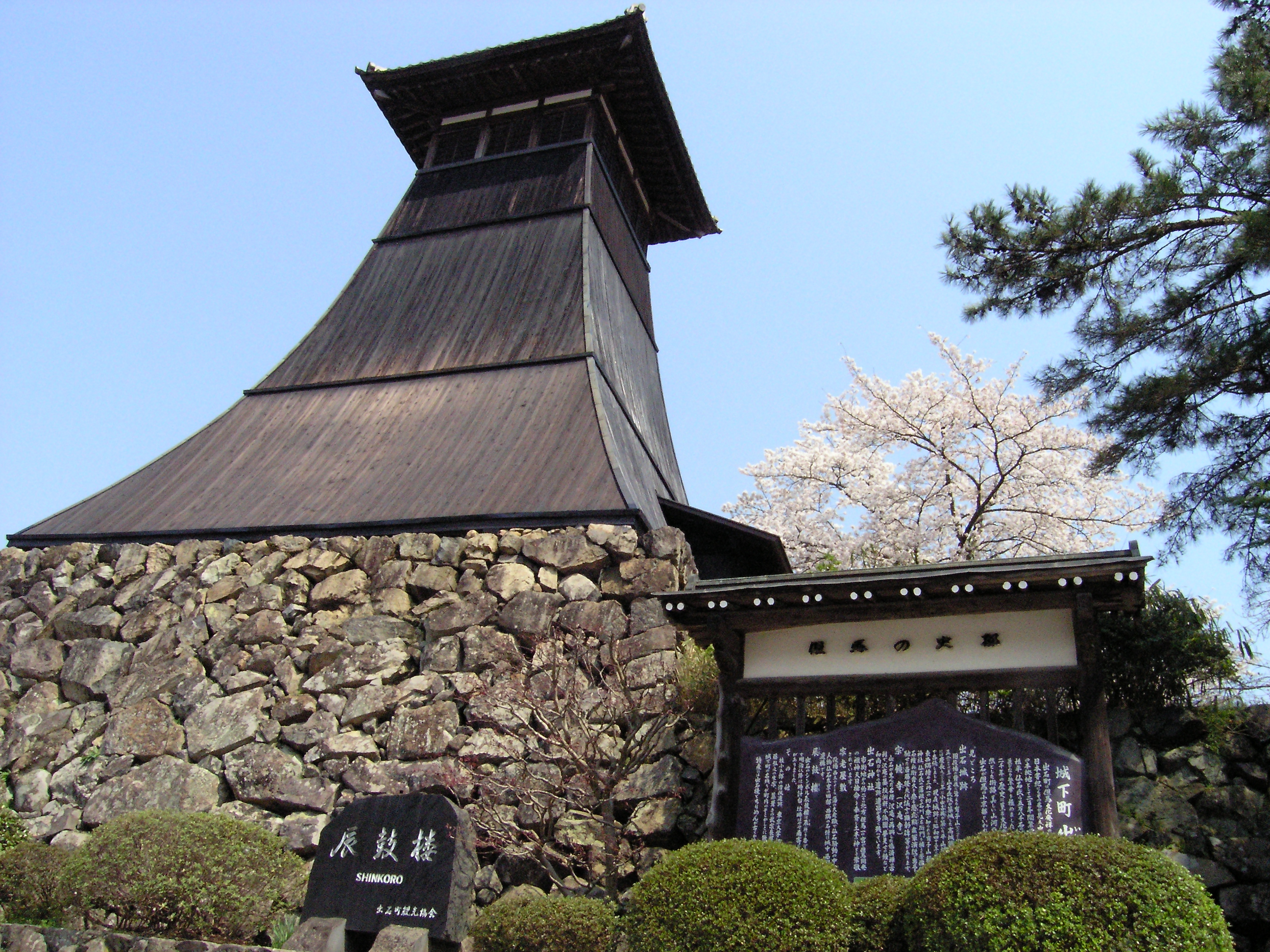
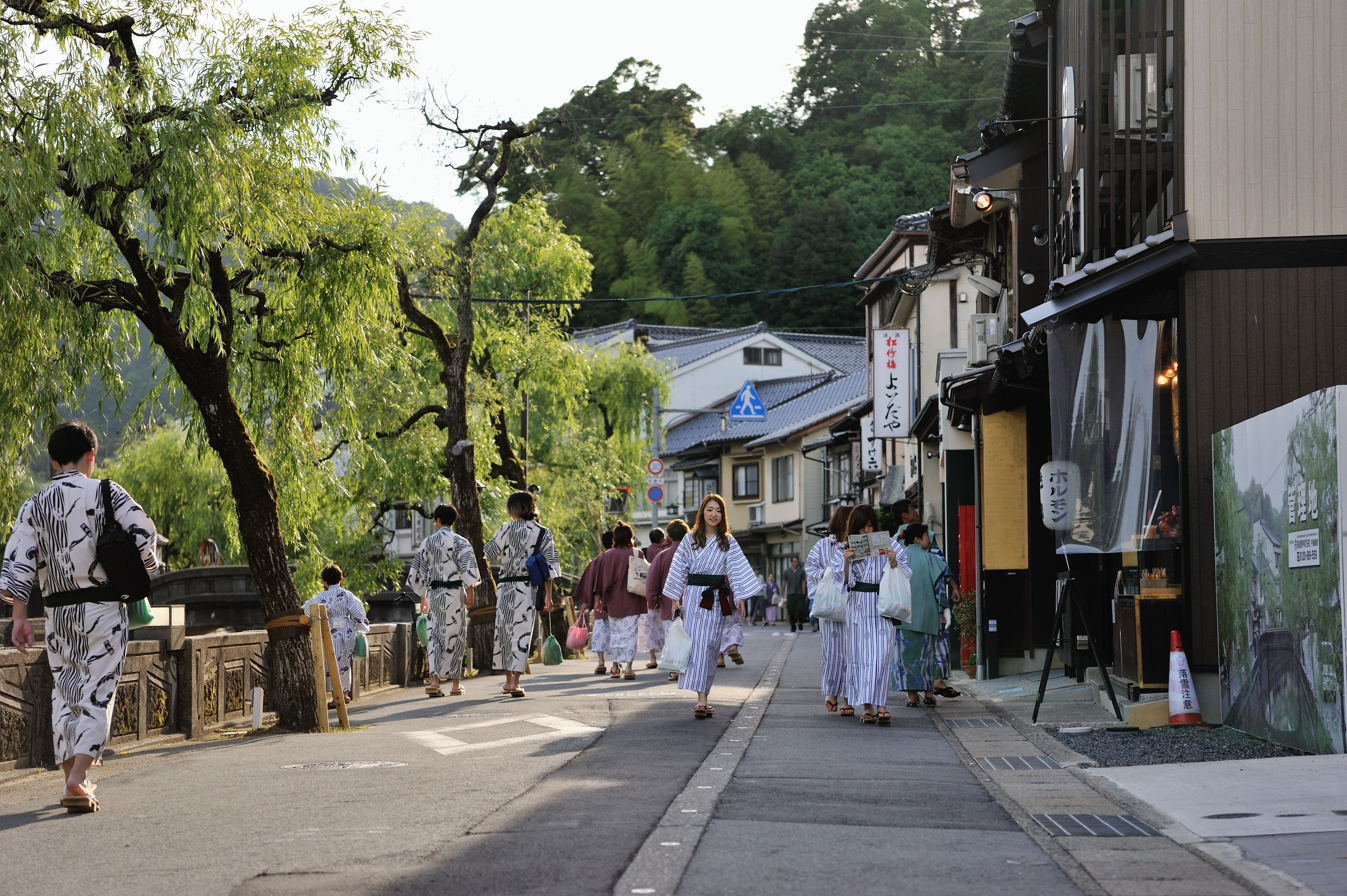
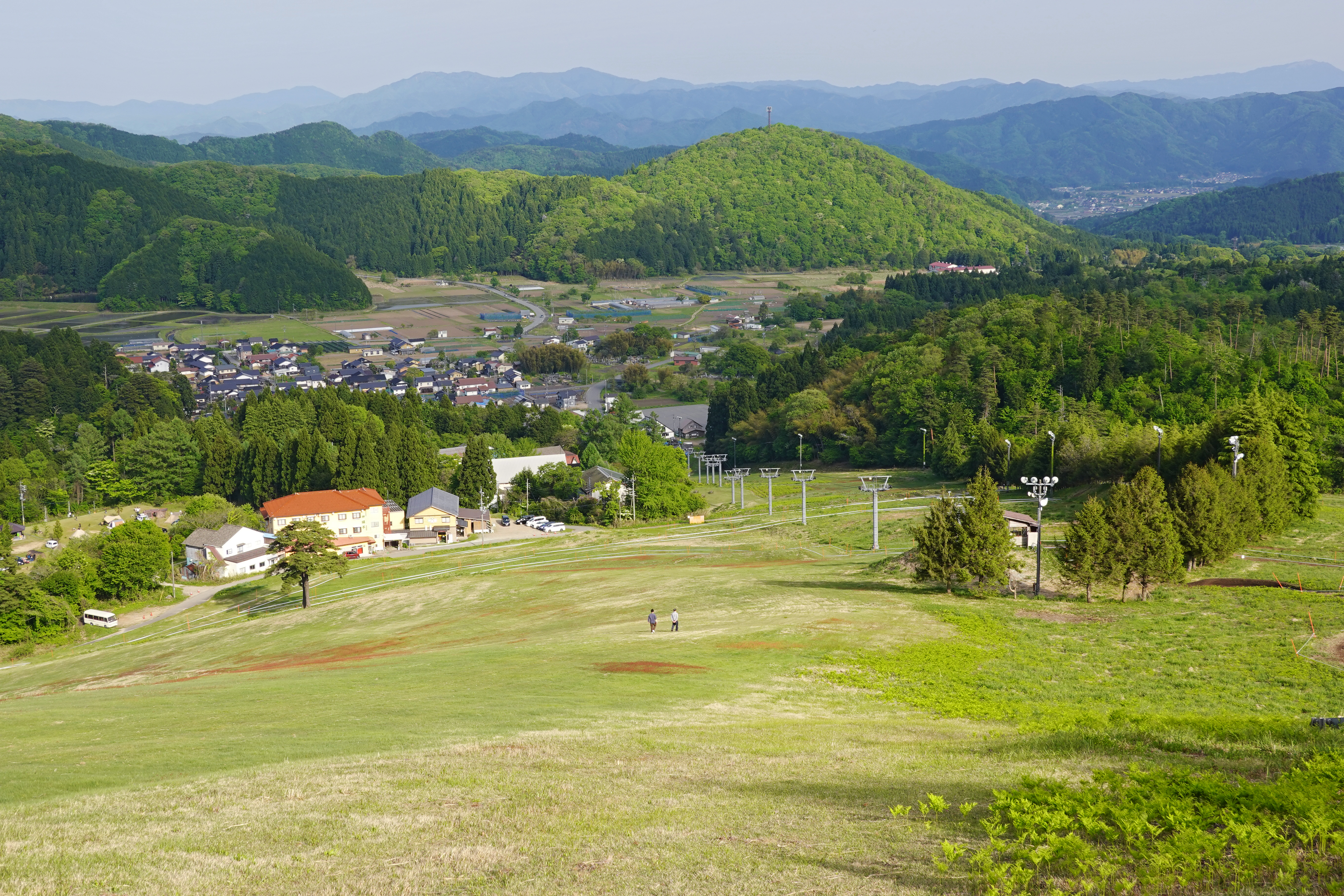
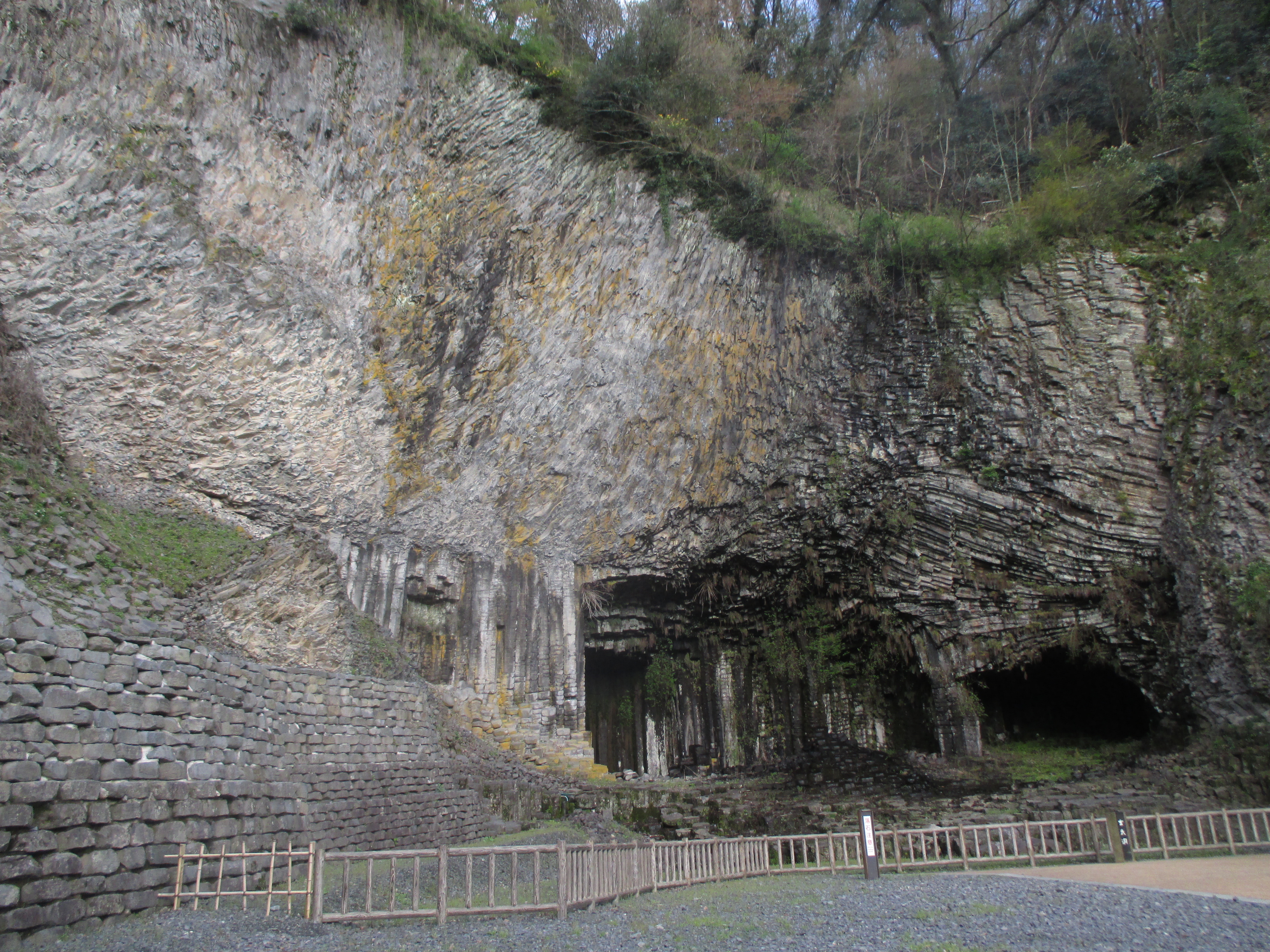
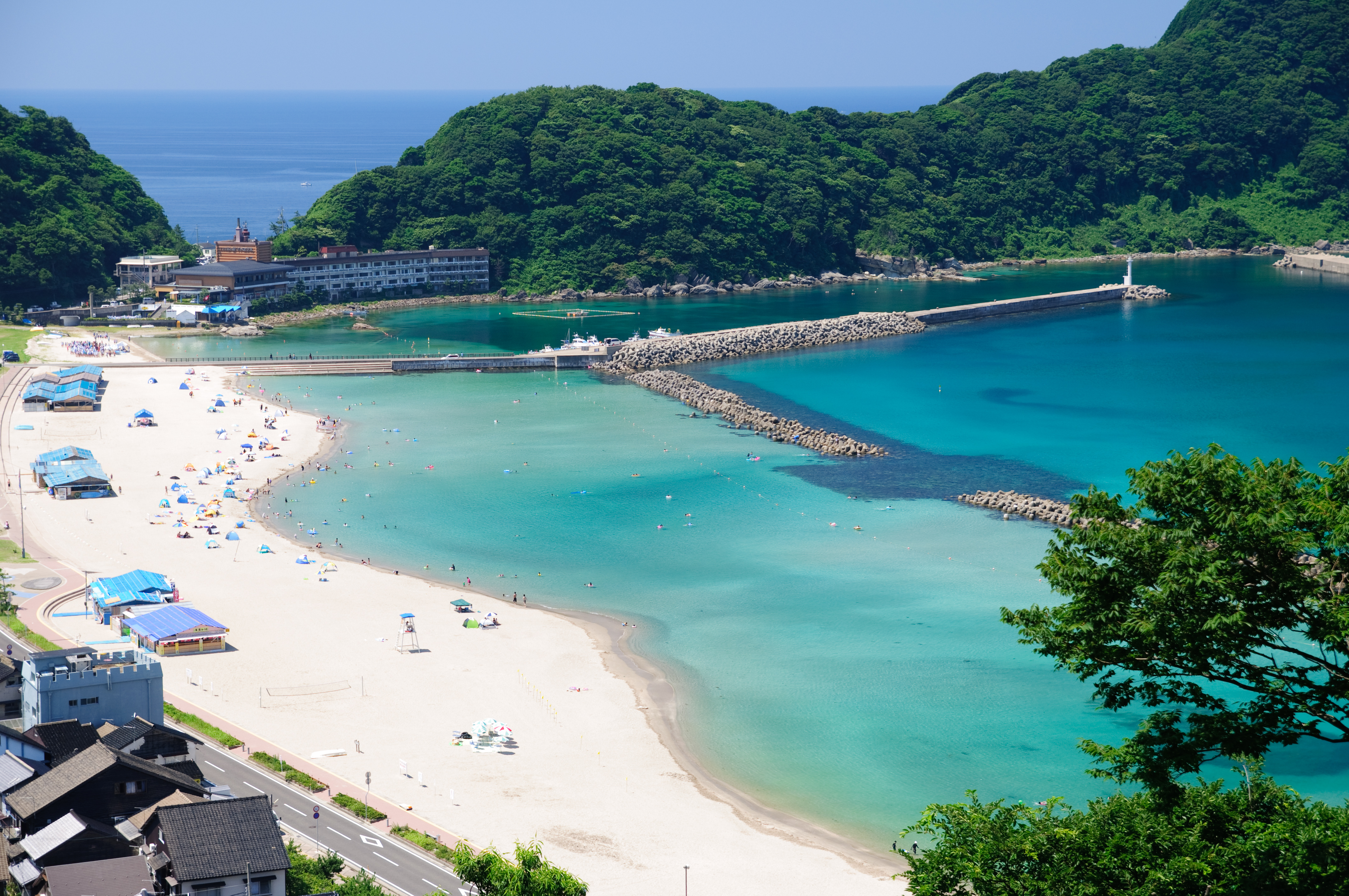
- Hyogo Prefectual White Stoke Park Shinkoro Clock Tower Kinosaki Spa Street Kannabe Resort Genbu Cave Takeno Beach

- Flag Seal

- Location of Toyooka in Hyōgo Prefecture

- Location in Japan
- Coordinates: 35°33′N 134°49′E
- Country: Japan
- Region: Kansai
- Prefecture: Hyōgo
- First official recorded: 655 BC
- Town settled: April 1, 1889
- City settled: April 1, 1950

Government
  - Mayor: Yuji Kadoma (門間雄司) from April 2025

Area
  - Total: 697.55 km^{2} (269.33 sq mi)

Population (October 1, 2023)
  - Total: 74,268
  - Density: 106.47/km^{2} (275.76/sq mi)
- Time zone: UTC+09:00 (JST)
- City hall address: 2-4 Chūōmachi, Toyooka-shi, Hyōgo-ken 668-8666
- Climate: Cfa
- Website: Official website
- Symbols
- Bird: Oriental white stork
- Flower: Tulip
- Tree: Willow

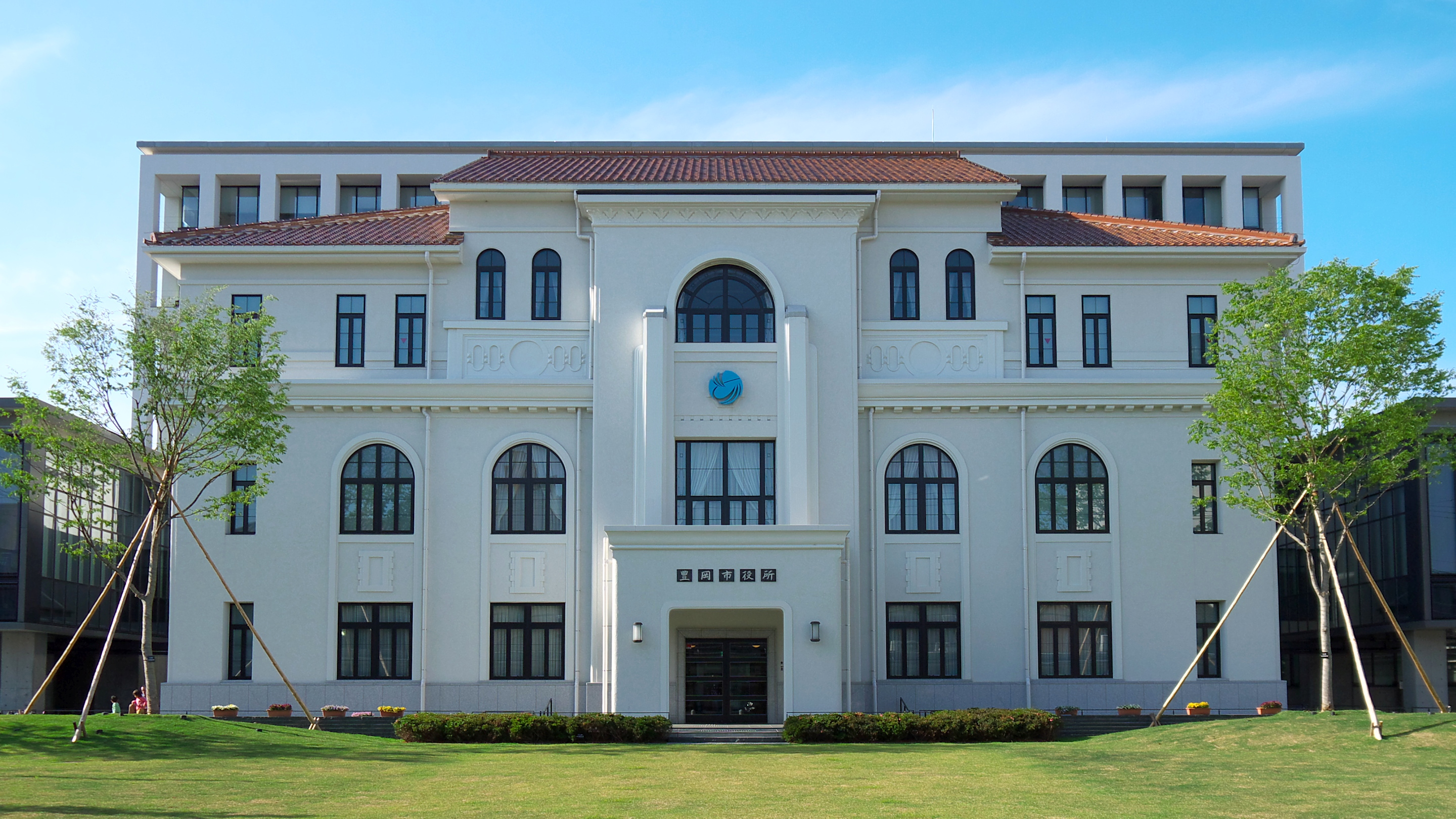
Toyooka City Hall and Toyooka City Council

Toyooka (豊岡市, Toyooka-shi; Japanese pronunciation: [tò̞.jó̞.ò̞.kä̀, -ó̞.kä́(.ɕì)]) is a city in the northern part of Hyōgo Prefecture, Japan. As of 31 March 2022, the city had an estimated population of 78,348 in 37,769 households and a population density of 110 persons per km^{2}. The total area of the city is 697.55 square kilometres (269.33 sq mi).

== Geography ==
Toyooka is located in the northern part of Hyōgo Prefecture and the Kinki region, facing the Sea of Japan in the north. It lies entirely within the San'in Kaigan Geopark. The Maruyama River flows through the central part of the city, and the Toyooka Basin, which is the largest basin in the Tajima region, spreads out in the central part of the city. Toyooka is located in the "snow country" of Japan and is characterized by heavy accumulations of snow in winter. One of Toyooka's famous geological features is a basalt cave called Gembudō. Gembudō was formed 1.6 million years ago from the eruption of an ancient volcano. In 1926, Professor Motonori Matuyama of Kyoto University first proposed the theory of geomagnetic polarity reversal at Genbudo after discovering it had a reverse magnetization.

The wetlands of Toyooka provide an important habitat for the oriental stork. After becoming extinct in the wild in the 1970s, Toyooka began a captive breeding program. After a quarter of a century of breeding efforts, the first oriental stork chick was born in 1989. In 2005 Toyooka released 5 captively bred storks, which bred successfully in the wild. As of June 2015 there are 72 wild oriental white storks in Toyooka.

The hot spring resort Kinosaki Onsen is located within Toyooka.

=== Neighbouring municipalities ===
Hyōgo Prefecture

- Asago
- Kami
- Yabu

Kyoto Prefecture

- Fukuchiyama
- Kyotango
- Yosano

=== Climate ===
Kyōtango has a humid subtropical climate (Köppen Cfa) characterized by warm, wet summers and cold winters with heavy snowfall. Although part of the Kansai region and Hyōgo Prefecture, Toyooka has a climate much more similar to the Hokuriku region of Chūbu and Tōhoku. Unlike Osaka or Kobe, which rarely see significant snowfall during the winter, Toyooka, exposed to the northerly winter winds driven by the Siberian High and Aleutian Low, receives 3.1 metres (122.0 in) of snowfall per year, though melt rates are high even during the winter and the maximum cover on the ground is typically only 0.35 metres (13.8 in) and has never exceeded 0.54 metres (21.3 in). Precipitation is much heavier than in central Kansai, though less heavy than in the Kii Peninsula or the Hokuriku region proper.

Climate data for Toyooka (1991−2020 normals, extremes 1918−present)
Month	Jan	Feb	Mar	Apr	May	Jun	Jul	Aug	Sep	Oct	Nov	Dec	Year
Record high °C (°F)	21.4 (70.5)	23.0 (73.4)	26.8 (80.2)	32.2 (90.0)	35.3 (95.5)	38.4 (101.1)	39.3 (102.7)	39.7 (103.5)	38.1 (100.6)	32.4 (90.3)	27.4 (81.3)	23.8 (74.8)	39.7 (103.5)
Mean maximum °C (°F)	14.4 (57.9)	16.9 (62.4)	22.4 (72.3)	28.5 (83.3)	31.4 (88.5)	33.5 (92.3)	36.5 (97.7)	37.2 (99.0)	34.2 (93.6)	29.2 (84.6)	23.5 (74.3)	17.6 (63.7)	37.5 (99.5)
Mean daily maximum °C (°F)	7.4 (45.3)	8.4 (47.1)	13.0 (55.4)	19.3 (66.7)	24.3 (75.7)	27.3 (81.1)	31.2 (88.2)	32.8 (91.0)	27.8 (82.0)	22.2 (72.0)	16.5 (61.7)	10.5 (50.9)	20.1 (68.1)
Daily mean °C (°F)	3.3 (37.9)	3.7 (38.7)	7.2 (45.0)	12.7 (54.9)	17.8 (64.0)	21.8 (71.2)	26.0 (78.8)	27.1 (80.8)	22.6 (72.7)	16.6 (61.9)	11.1 (52.0)	5.9 (42.6)	14.7 (58.4)
Mean daily minimum °C (°F)	0.4 (32.7)	0.2 (32.4)	2.4 (36.3)	6.9 (44.4)	12.4 (54.3)	17.7 (63.9)	22.3 (72.1)	23.1 (73.6)	18.9 (66.0)	12.6 (54.7)	7.2 (45.0)	2.5 (36.5)	10.6 (51.0)
Mean minimum °C (°F)	−3.6 (25.5)	−3.7 (25.3)	−2.6 (27.3)	0.2 (32.4)	6.3 (43.3)	12.3 (54.1)	18.7 (65.7)	18.9 (66.0)	13.1 (55.6)	6.8 (44.2)	1.8 (35.2)	−2.0 (28.4)	−4.6 (23.7)
Record low °C (°F)	−12.5 (9.5)	−11.1 (12.0)	−11.0 (12.2)	−3.2 (26.2)	0.7 (33.3)	6.0 (42.8)	13.0 (55.4)	13.8 (56.8)	7.9 (46.2)	2.0 (35.6)	−2.2 (28.0)	−9.1 (15.6)	−12.5 (9.5)
Average precipitation mm (inches)	248.0 (9.76)	188.0 (7.40)	150.6 (5.93)	99.6 (3.92)	122.1 (4.81)	150.0 (5.91)	187.7 (7.39)	144.5 (5.69)	243.8 (9.60)	172.4 (6.79)	154.6 (6.09)	227.6 (8.96)	2,072 (81.57)
Average snowfall cm (inches)	82 (32)	74 (29)	14 (5.5)	trace	0 (0)	0 (0)	0 (0)	0 (0)	0 (0)	0 (0)	trace	34 (13)	204 (80)
Average precipitation days (≥ 1.0 mm)	21.2	17.0	15.0	10.7	10.0	10.9	11.9	9.9	12.8	12.0	14.1	19.5	165
Average snowy days (≥ 1 cm)	12.5	11.3	2.9	0.1	0	0	0	0	0	0	0.1	5.7	32.6
Average relative humidity (%)	84	81	75	71	71	77	79	76	80	81	82	83	78
Mean monthly sunshine hours	65.0	75.4	116.8	164.0	186.8	138.1	150.5	189.0	123.2	115.0	90.6	72.9	1,487.3
Source: Japan Meteorological Agency

=== Demographics ===
Per Japanese census data, the population of Toyooka in 2020 is 77,489 people. Toyooka has been conducting censuses since 1950.

Historical population
Year	Pop.	±%
1950	102,838	—
1955	102,557	−0.3%
1960	99,572	−2.9%
1965	96,599	−3.0%
1970	94,732	−1.9%
1975	95,687	+1.0%
1980	96,448	+0.8%
1985	96,086	−0.4%
1990	94,163	−2.0%
1995	93,859	−0.3%
2000	92,752	−1.2%
2005	89,208	−3.8%
2010	85,607	−4.0%
2015	82,250	−3.9%
2020	77,489	−5.8%
Toyooka population statistics

== History ==
The area of Toyooka was the center of ancient Tajima Province in the early 8th century and the location of the provincial capital and the Tajima Kokubun-ji. From the Muromachi period to the end of the Sengoku period, the area was under the stronghold of the powerful Yamana clan. Under the Edo Period Tokugawa shogunate, Toyooka Domain and Izushi Domain existed within the borders of what is now the city of Toyooka. In 1871, following the Meiji restoration, "Toyooka Prefecture" incorporating all of the former feudal territories within Tajima, Tango and Tanba Provinces was created. It was abolished on August 21, 1876, when Hyōgo Prefecture was created. The town of Toyooka was officially established with the creation of the modern municipalities system on April 1, 1889. The 1925 North Tajima earthquake created severe damage in Toyooka, with official government reports, indicating that there were 428 fatalities, 1,016 injuries, 7,863 buildings destroyed, and 45,659 houses damaged by collapse or fire.

The city of Toyooka was created on April 1, 1950 by the merger of Toyooka with neighboring Gosho, Nitta, and Nakasuji villages. The city expanded on April 1, 1955 by annexing Nasa and Minato villages. On April 1, 2005, the towns of Kinosaki, Hidaka and Takeno (all from Kinosaki District) and the towns of Izushi and Tantō (both from Izushi District) were merged into Toyooka.

== Government ==
Toyooka has a mayor-council form of government with a directly elected mayor and a unicameral city council of 24 members. Toyooka contributes one member to the Hyogo Prefectural Assembly. In terms of national politics, the city is part of Hyōgo 5th district of the lower house of the Diet of Japan.

== Economy ==
Toyooka has a primarily rural economy based on agriculture and commercial fishing.

== Education ==
Toyooka has 22 public elementary schools and nine public middle schools operated by the city government and four public high schools operated by the Hyōgo Prefectural Department of Education. There is also one private middle school and one private high school. The Toyooka Junior College and the Professional College of Arts and Tourism are also located in the city. The prefecture also operates two special education schools for the handicapped.

== Transportation ==
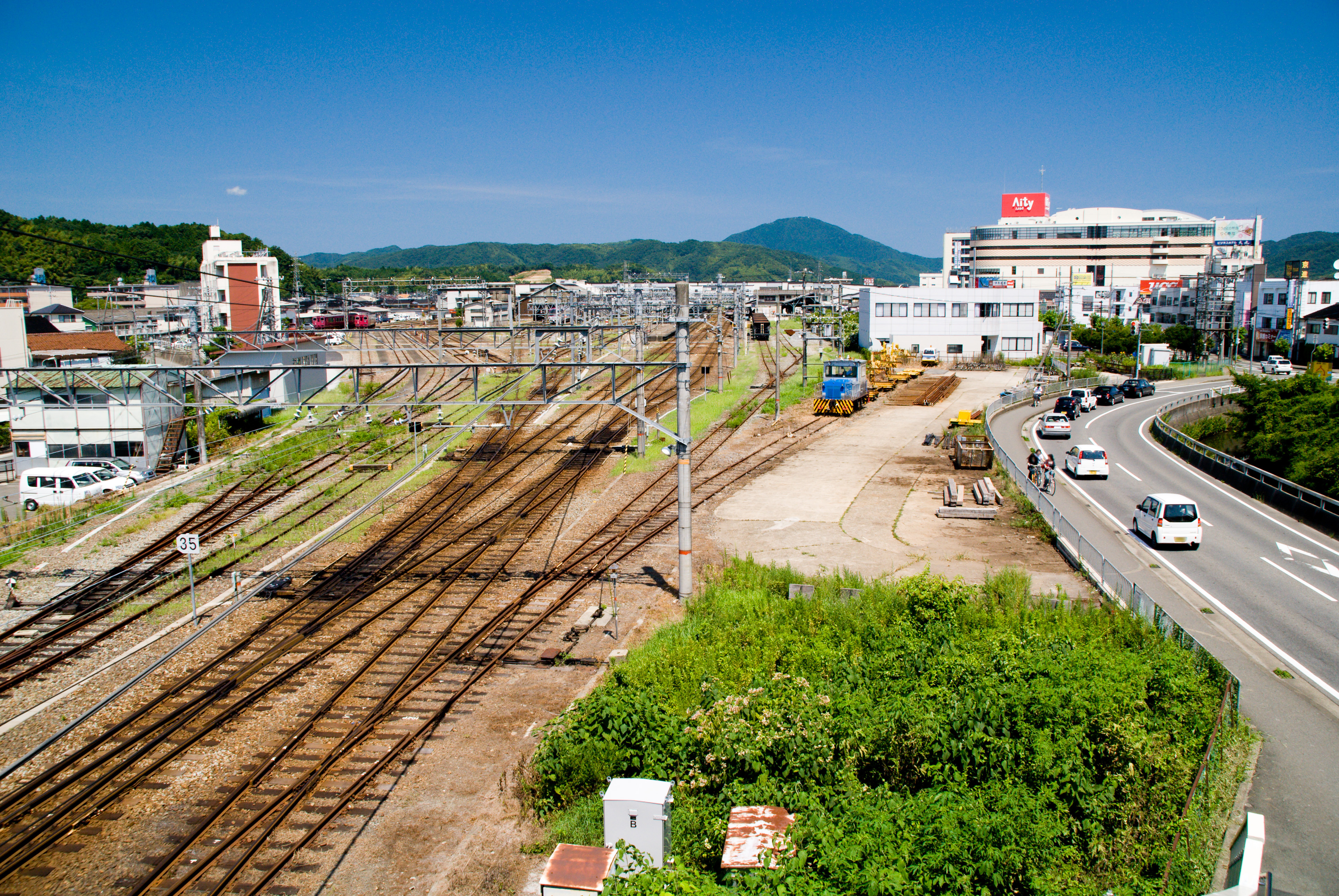
Fukuchiyama branch office of JR West on Toyooka.

=== Railway ===
The Sanin Main Line provides a JR rail connection to Kyoto, and direct trains to Osaka are available via Fukuchiyama. Direct Express trains take about 2.5 hours from Osaka to Toyooka.

JR West – San'in Main Line

- Ebara - Kokufu - Toyooka - Gembudō - Kinosaki Onsen - Takeno

Kyoto Tango Railway – Miyazu Line

- Toyooka - Kōnotori-no-sato

=== Highways ===
- Kitakinki-Toyooka Expressway
- National Route 178
- National Route 312
- National Route 426
- National Route 482
- National Route 483

=== Airport ===
Tajima Airport serves Toyooka and its area with two direct flights a day to Osaka Itami Airport

== Sister cities ==
- (Japan) Ueda, Nagano Prefecture (since the former city of Ueda and the former town of Izushi were sister cities before the recent creation of both Toyooka and Ueda)
- Gyeongju, South Korea
- Alicante, Spain, since 1996

== Local attractions ==
- Hyōgo Prefectural Stork Nature Park
- Izushi Castle
- Kinosaki Marine World
- Kinosaki Onsen
- Mount Kannabe
- Tajima Kokubun-ji ruins
- Takeno Beach
- Oomoto Hikari no Michi religious organization headquarters
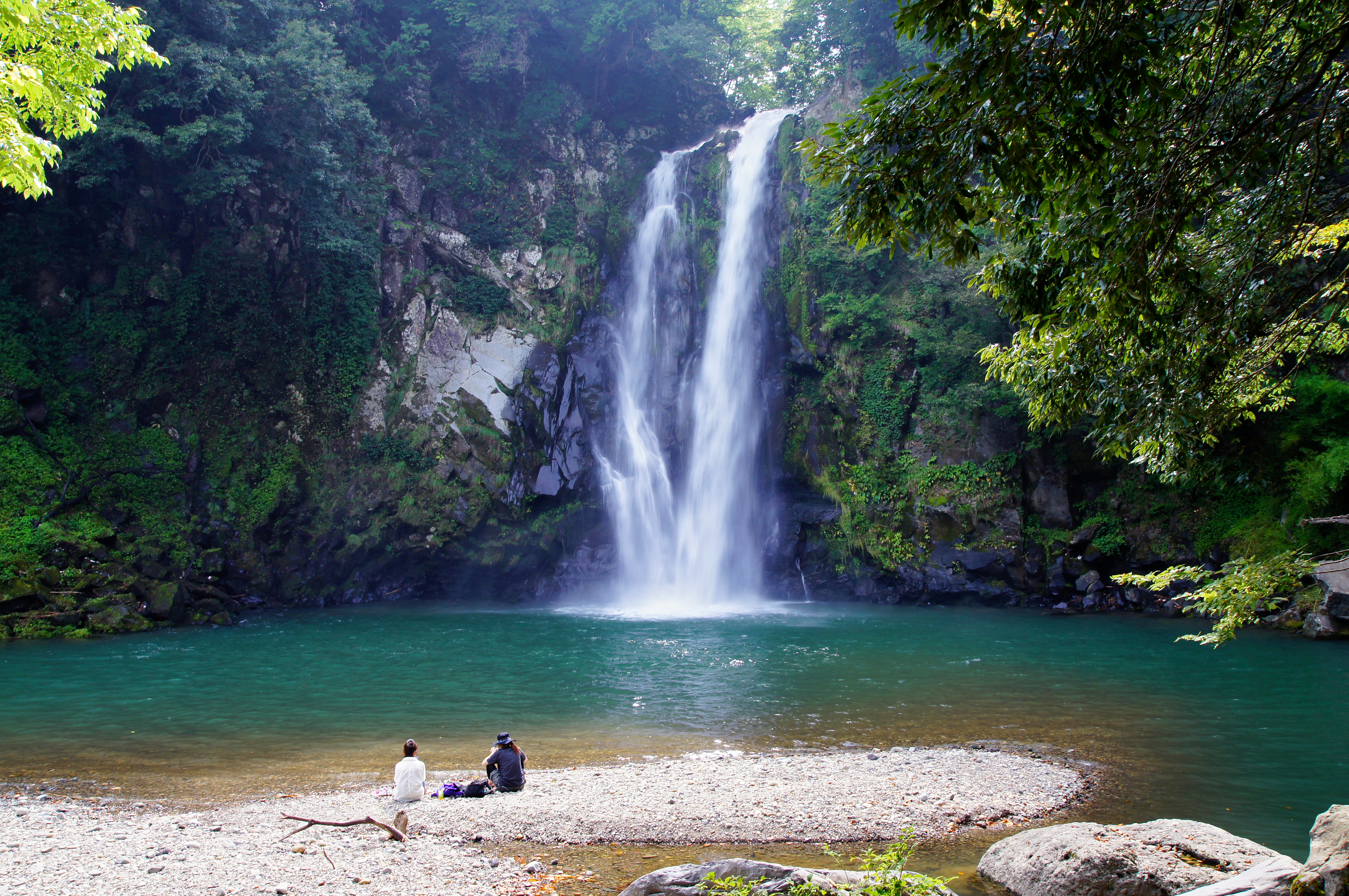
Hattan Falls in Kannabe highlands

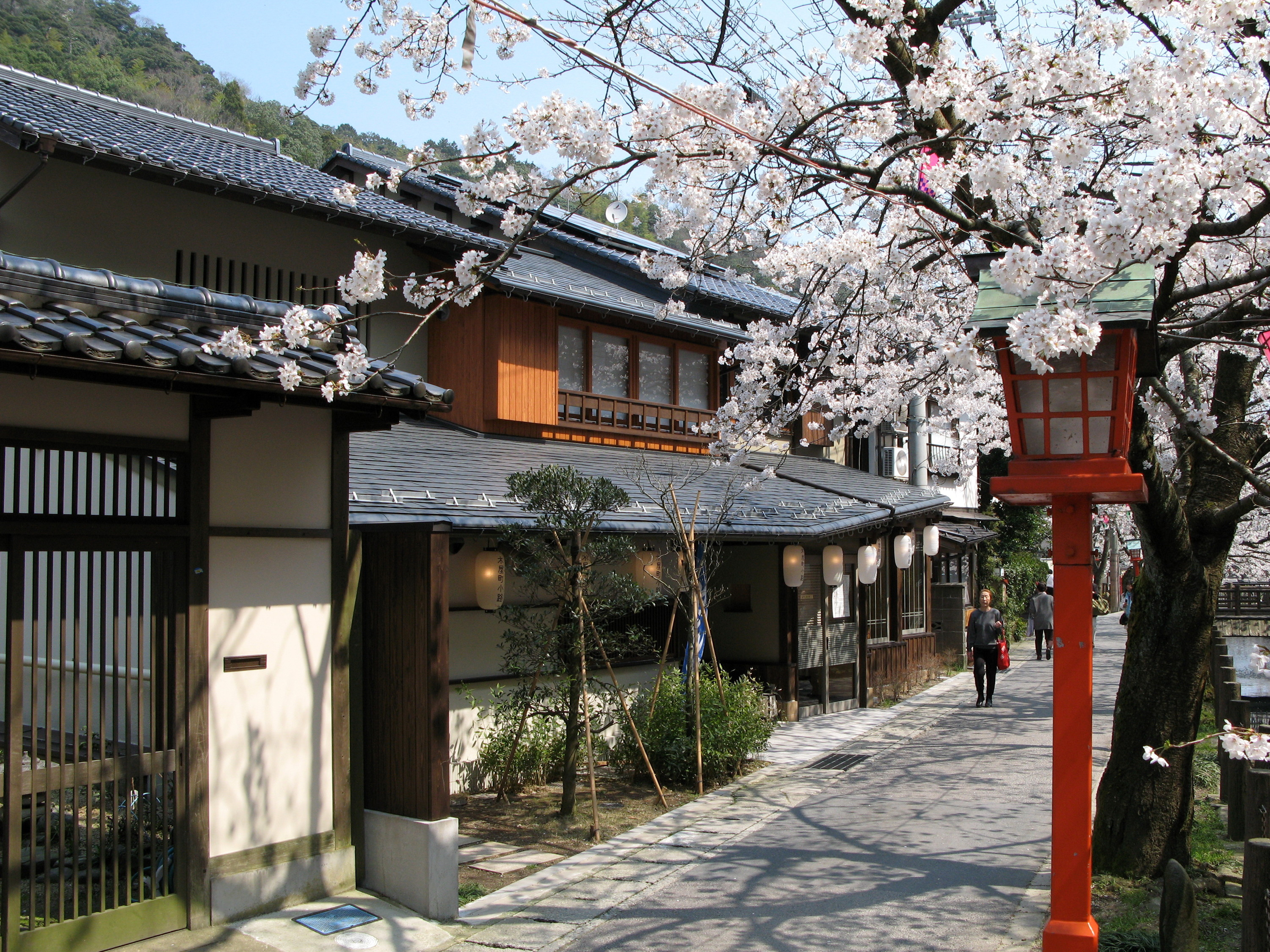
Cherry blossoms in Kinosaki Onsen

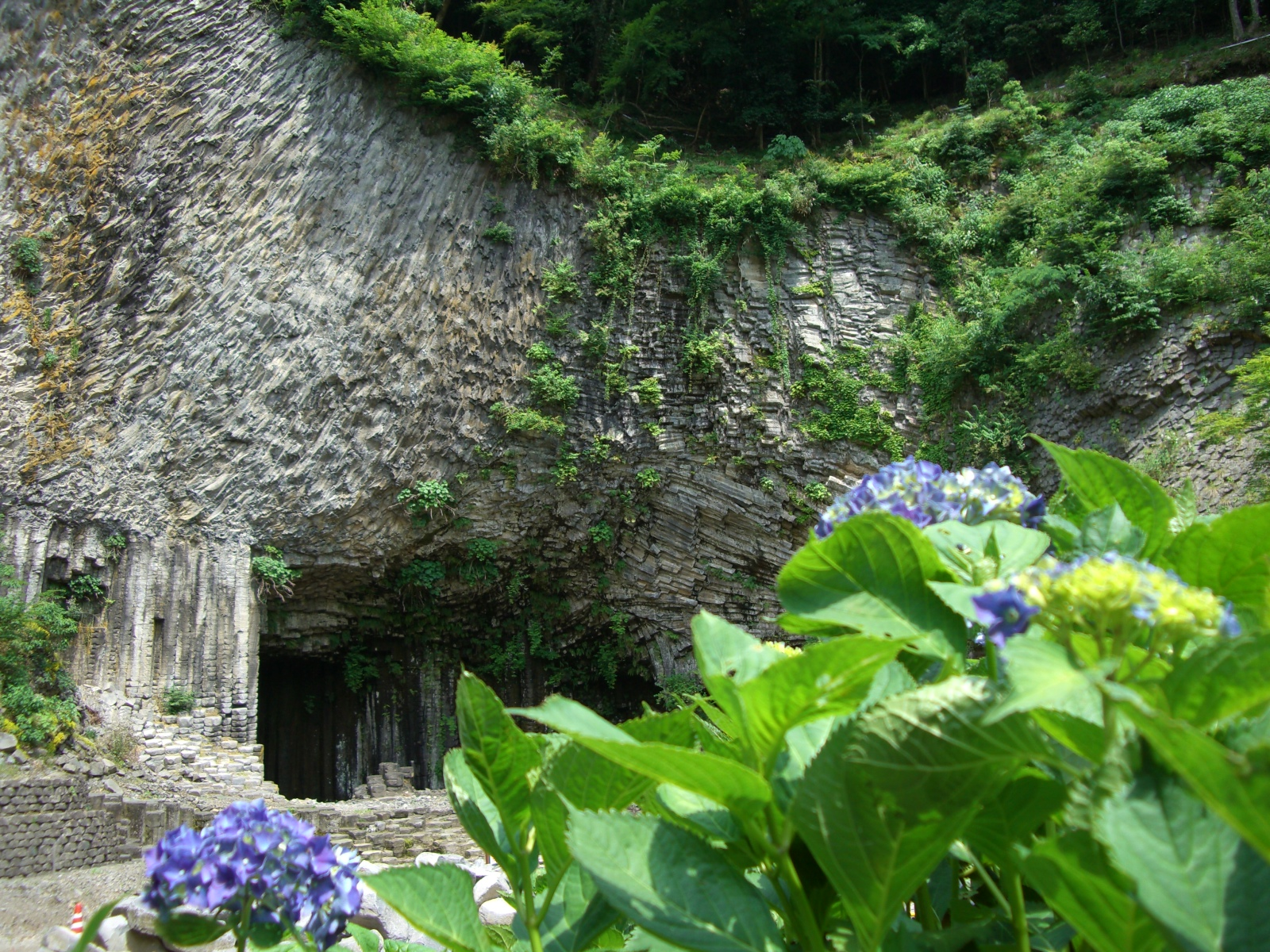
Genbudo cave

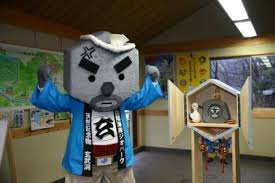
Toyooka City Mascot Gensan

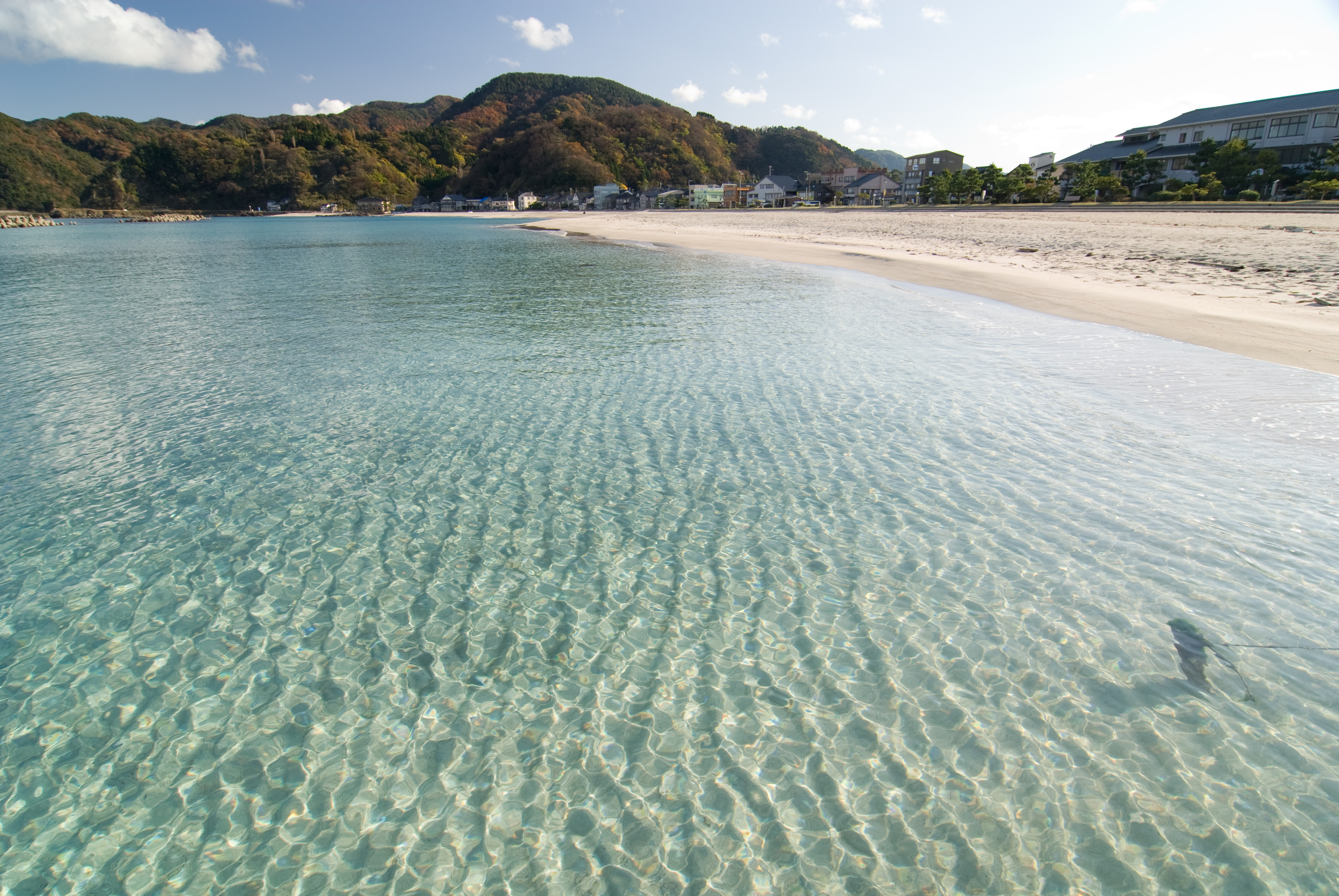
Takeno Beach

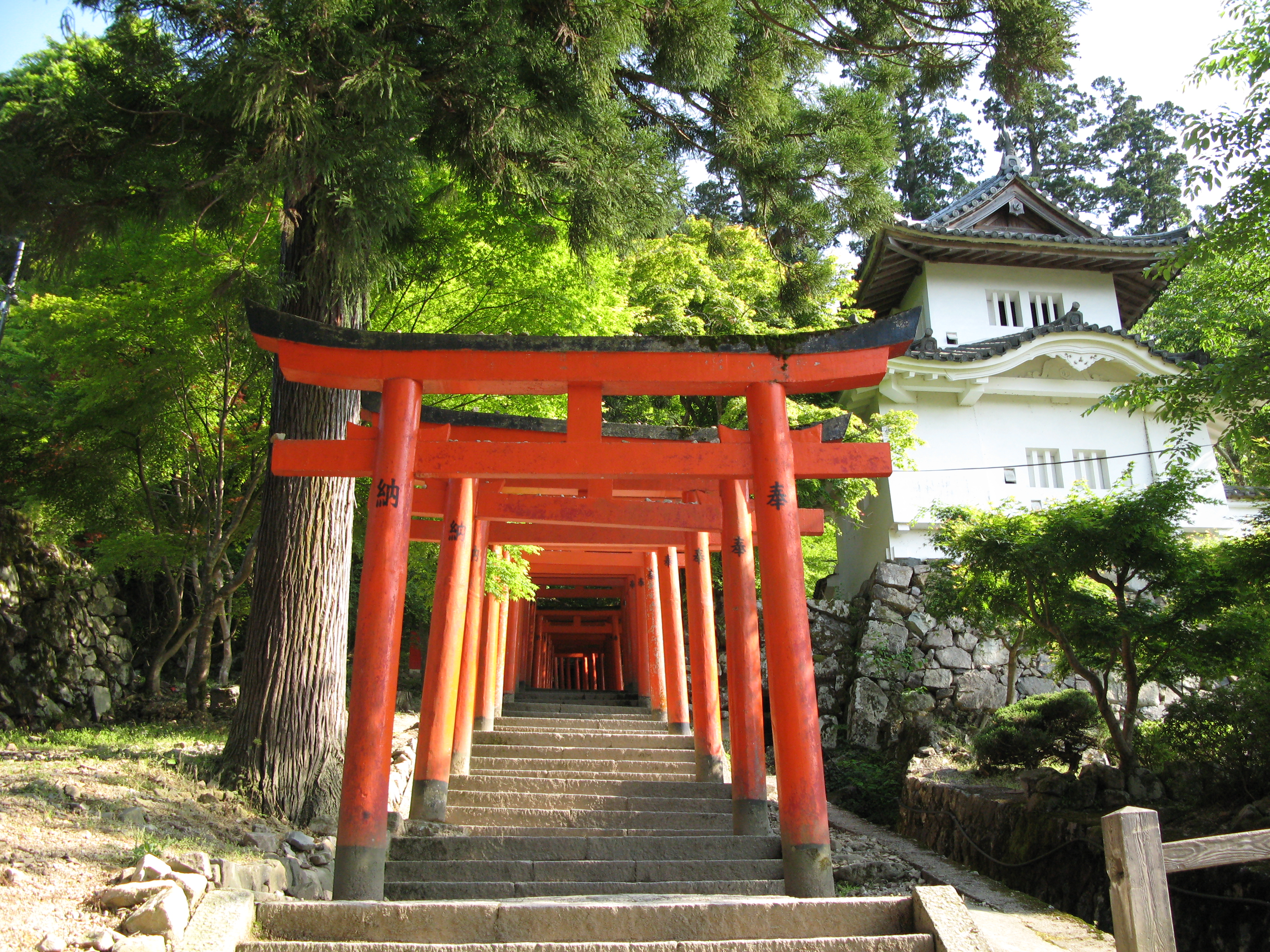
Izushi Castle Inari Shrine

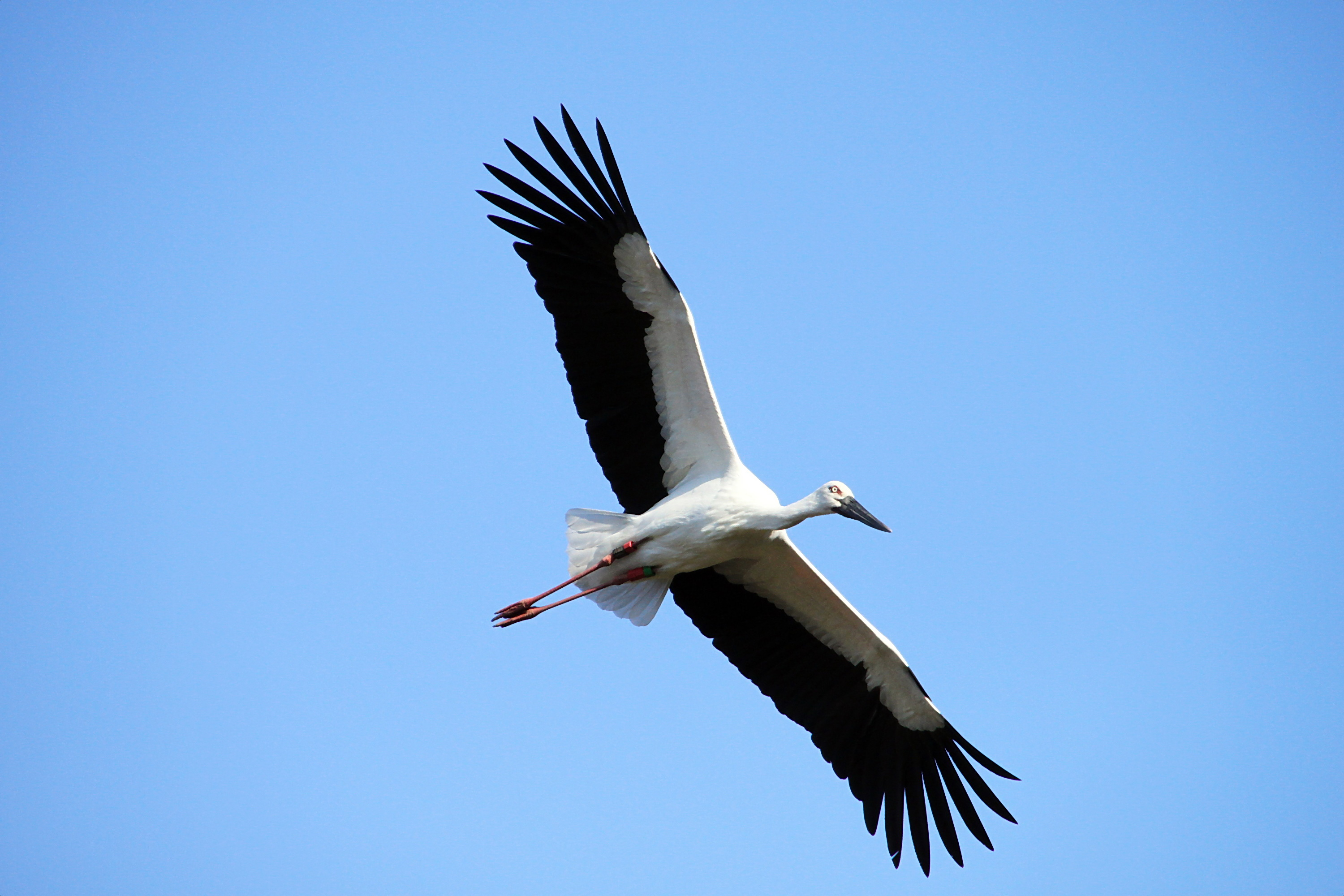
Toyooka City Oriental white stork
