= Kokufu Station =

Railway station in Toyooka, Hyōgo Prefecture, Japan

Kokufu Station 国府駅
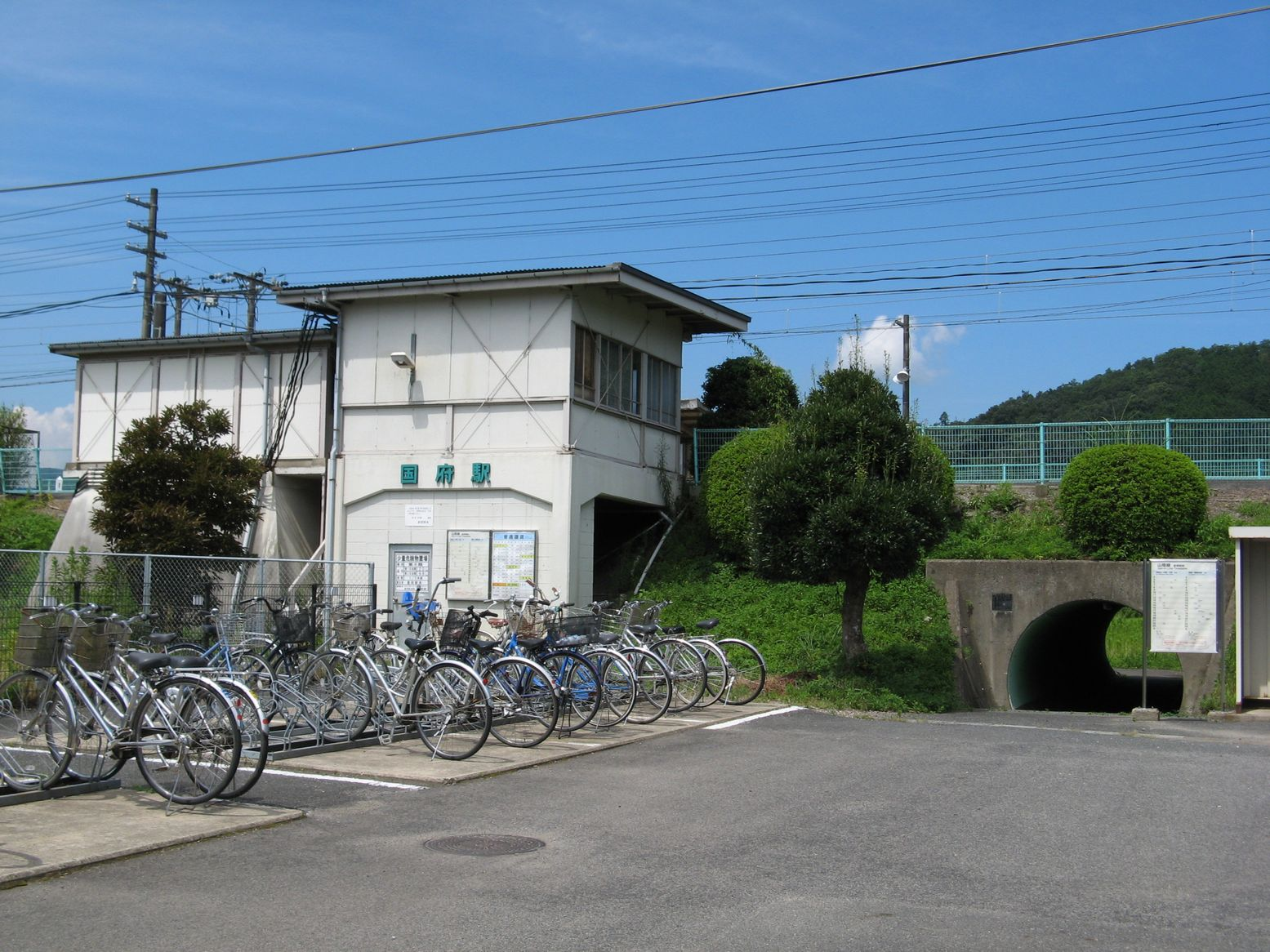
- Kokufu Station, August 2007

General information
- Location: Hidakacho Ageshi, Toyooka-shi, Hyōgo-ken 669-5331; Japan
- Coordinates: 35°29′47″N 134°48′00″E
- Owner: West Japan Railway Company
- Operator: West Japan Railway Company
- Line: San'in Main Line
- Distance: 142.4 km (88.5 miles) from Kyoto
- Platforms: 2 side platforms
- Connections: Bus stop

Construction
- Structure type: Ground level

Other information
- Status: Unstaffed
- Website: Official website

History
- Opened: 13 October 1948

Passengers
- FY 2023: 158 daily
Location
- Location within Hyōgo Prefecture Location within Japan

Kokufu Station (国府駅, Kokufu-eki) is a passenger railway station located in the city of Toyooka, Hyōgo Prefecture, Japan, operated by West Japan Railway Company (JR West).

== Lines ==
Kokufu Station is served by the San'in Main Line, and is located 142.4 kilometers from the terminus of the line at Kyoto.

== Station layout ==
The station consists of two opposed side platforms located on an embankment, connected by an underground passage. The station is unattended.

=== Platforms ===
1	■ San'in Main Line	for Kyoto and Osaka
2	■ San'in Main Line	for Toyooka and Kinosaki Onsen

== Adjacent stations ==
«	Service	»
West Japan Railway Company (JR West) Sanin Main Line
Limited Express Hamakaze: Does not stop at this station
Ebara	Local	Toyooka

== History ==
Kokufu Station opened on October 13, 1948. With the privatization of the Japan National Railways (JNR) on April 1, 1987, the station came under the aegis of the West Japan Railway Company.

== Passenger statistics ==
In fiscal 2016, the station was used by an average of 95 passengers daily.

== Surrounding area ==
- Choraku-ji
- Saikou-ji
- Toyooka City Fuchu Elementary School

== See also ==
- List of railway stations in Japan
