= Kinosaki District =

Former district in Hyōgo prefecture, Japan

Kinosaki (城崎郡, Kinosaki-gun) was a district in Hyōgo Prefecture, Japan. The district was dissolved in 2005, and its towns were merged into Mikata District and the city of Toyooka, both within Hyōgo Prefecture.

As of 2003, the district had an estimated population of 41,455 and a density of 98.36/km^{2} (254.8/sq mi). The total area was 421.48 km^{2} (162.73 sq mi).

== Former towns and villages ==
- Hidaka
- Kasumi
- Kinosaki
- Takeno

== Mergers ==
- On April 1, 2005, the town of Kasumi was merged with the towns of Mikata and Muraoka (both from Mikata District) to create the town of Kami (in Mikata District).
- On April 1, 2005, the towns of Hidaka, Kinosaki, and Takeno, along with the towns of Izushi and Tantō (both from Izushi District), were merged into the expanded city of Toyooka. Kinosaki District was dissolved as a result of this merger.
