= Hidaka, Hyōgo =

Dissolved municipality in Hyōgo prefecture, Japan

Hidaka (日高町, Hidaka-chō; Japanese pronunciation: [çiꜜ.da.ka, çi.da.kaꜜ.tɕoː]) was a town located in Kinosaki District, Hyōgo Prefecture, Japan.

As of 1 October 2010, the district of Hidaka has an estimated population of 17,242.

On April 1, 2005, Hidaka, along with the towns of Kinosaki and Takeno (all from Kinosaki District), and the towns of Izushi and Tantō (both from Izushi District), was merged into the expanded city of Toyooka and no longer exists as an independent municipality.
