= Takeno, Hyōgo =

Dissolved municipality in Hyōgo prefecture, Japan

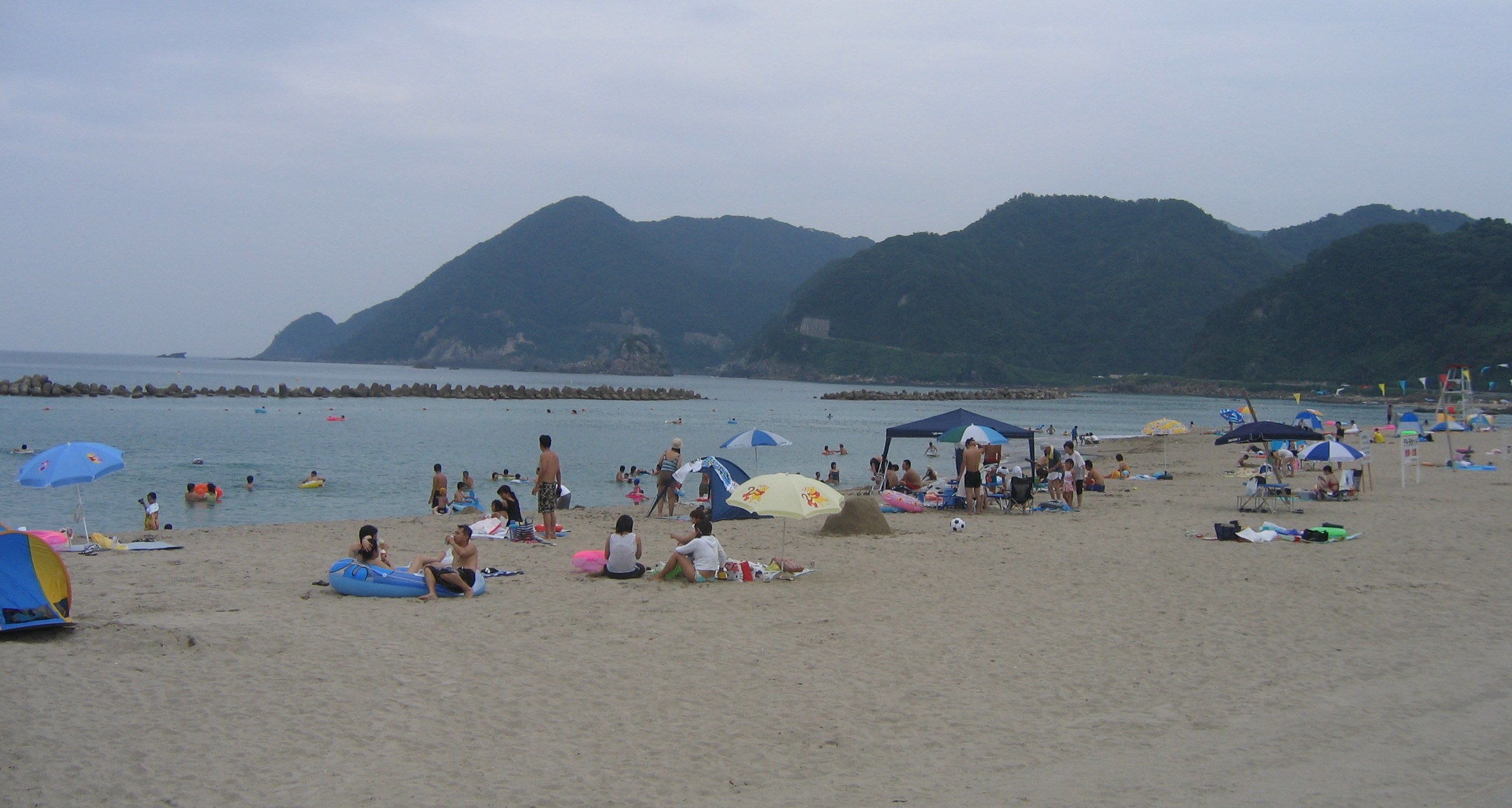
The beach at Takeno in summer

Takeno (竹野町, Takeno-chō) was a town in Kinosaki District, Hyōgo Prefecture, Japan.

On April 1, 2005, Takeno, along with the towns of Kinosaki and Hidaka (all from Kinosaki District), and the towns of Izushi and Tantō (both from Izushi District), was merged into the expanded city of Toyooka, and no longer exists as an independent municipality.

As of 1 October 2010, the district of Takeno had an estimated population of 4,973.

== Tourism ==
Takeno beach is a tourist destination during the summer months.
