= Tantō, Hyōgo =

Dissolved municipality in Hyōgo prefecture, Japan

Tantō (但東町, Tantō-chō) was a town in Izushi District, Hyōgo Prefecture, Japan.

As of 1 October 2010, Tantō district has an estimated population of 4,742.

On April 1, 2005, Tantō, along with the towns of Kinosaki, Hidaka and Takeno (all from Kinosaki District), and the town of Izushi (also from Izushi District), was merged into the expanded city of Toyooka, and no longer exists as an independent municipality.
