= Izushi District =

Former district in Hyōgo prefecture, Japan

Izushi (出石郡, Izushi-gun) was a district located in Hyōgo, Japan.

As of 2003, the district had an estimated population of 16,601 and a density of 66.12 persons per km^{2}. The total area was 251.09 km^{2}.

== Towns and villages ==
- Izushi
- Tantō

== Merger ==
- On April 1, 2005 - the towns of Izushi and Tantō, along with the towns of Hidaka, Kinosaki and Takeno (all from Kinosaki District), were merged into the expanded city of Toyooka. Izushi District was dissolved as a result of this merger.
