= Izushi, Hyōgo =

Dissolved municipality in Hyōgo prefecture, Japan

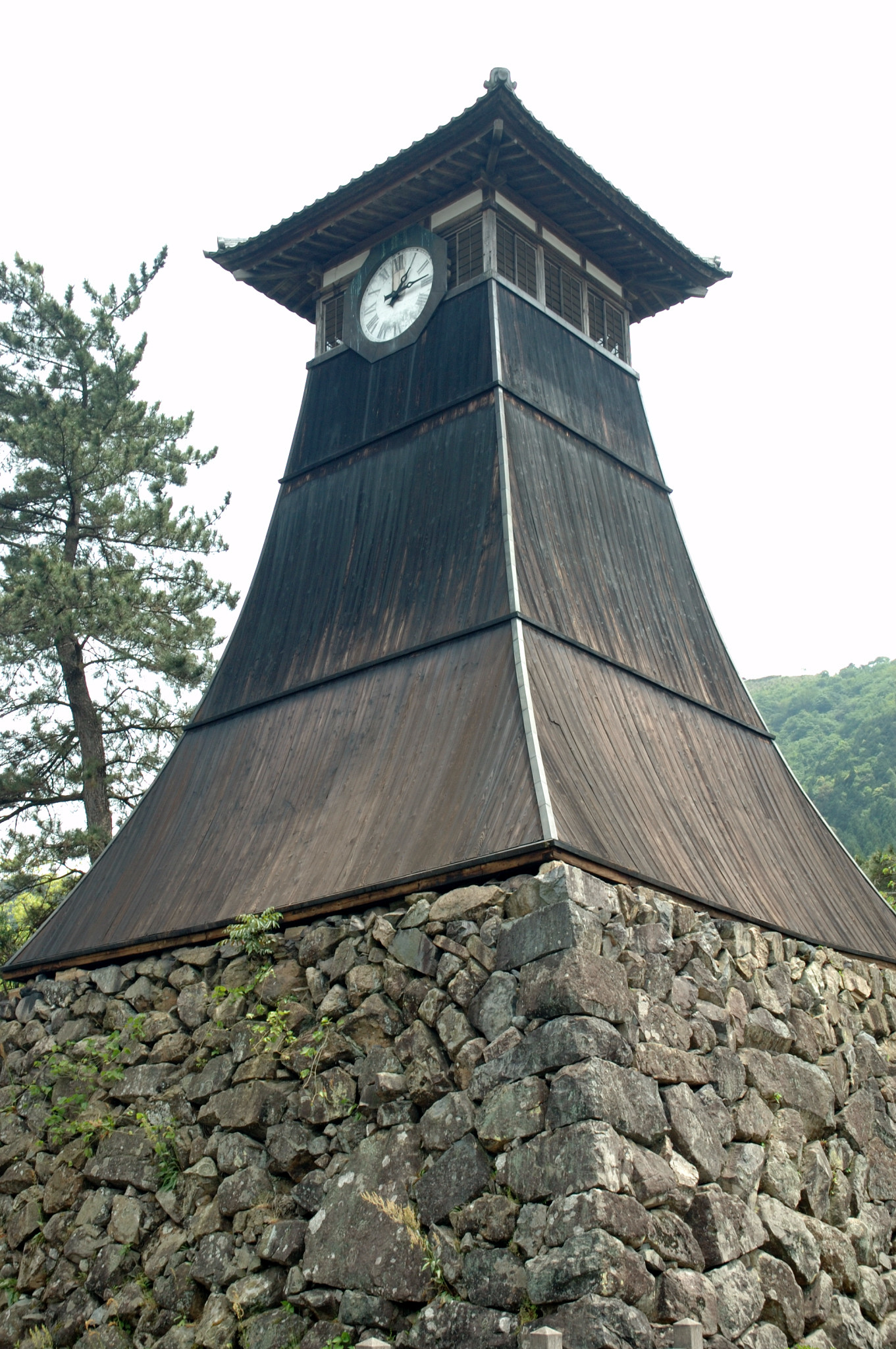
The Shinkoro wooden clock tower, a symbol of the town

Izushi (出石町, Izushi-chō) was a town in Izushi District, Hyōgo Prefecture, Japan. It is now part of the city of Toyooka, Hyōgo.

== Demographics ==
As of 1 October 2010 Izushi district had an estimated population of 10,259. Because of yearly flooding problems and cheaper modes of transit, Izushi's ancient river port has long been closed. The railways were also taken out, leaving Izushi accessible by car, bus, and bike only. The average weather temperatures in the Toyooka area range between -3 °C (26 °F) in January to 35 °C (95 °F) in August.

On April 1, 2005, Izushi, along with the towns of Kinosaki, Hidaka and Takeno (all from Kinosaki District), and the town of Tantō (also from Izushi District), were merged into the expanded city of Toyooka. Izushi no longer exists as an independent municipality.

== Education ==
Izushi Junior High School's sister school is Whitman Middle School in Seattle. The short-term homestay program has been successful for both schools and has been running, with some exceptions, since March 1999.

== Tourism ==
Izushi has castle ruins, a popular local scenic spot. The first and original castle's location on top of Mount Ariko was too difficult for even the ruling family and their retainers to reach easily and, in 1604, it was moved to the base of the mountain. It is the second castle's location which now a popular tourist spot and a beautiful backdrop for several local matsuri (festivals), such as the Kimono Matsuri (September), Kenka Danjiri (Fighting Floats—October), Oshiro Matsuri (Castle Festival—November) and Hatsu Uma (First Horseride—March). While the castle itself does not exist anymore, the two front guardhouses were restored in 1968. The original castle foundations are still on top of the mountain and are accessible by hiking only.

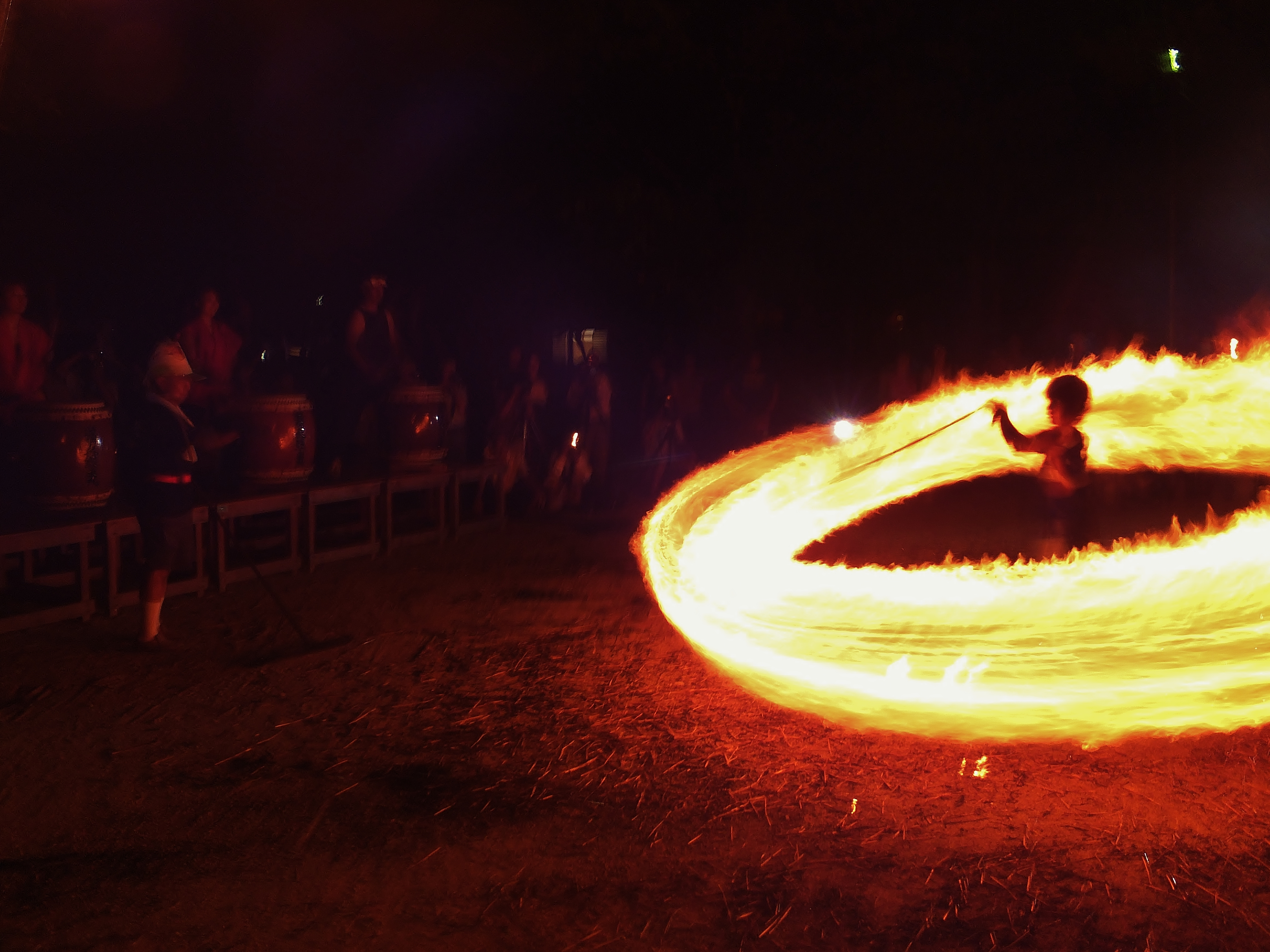
The Hi Matsuri (Fire Festival) in Izushi

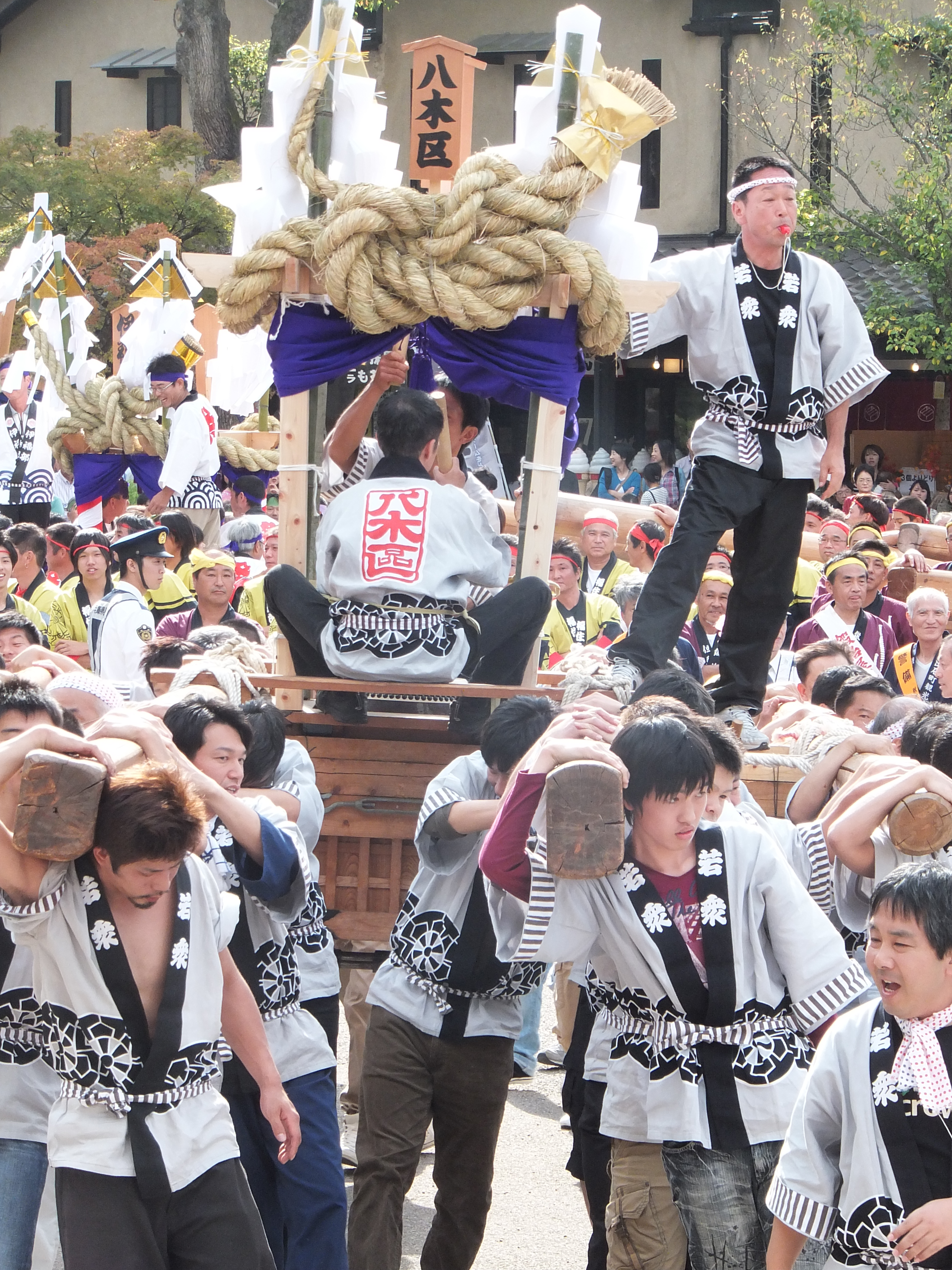
The Kenka Danjiri (Fighting Floats Festival) in Izushi

The most iconic image of Izushi is the Shinkoro clock tower. Built in the Meiji Era, the wooden clock's name means "eight o'clock drum tower". This is in reference to the old system of time in Japan, where shin was the starting point of the day between 7 o'clock to 9 o'clock. A drum would beat to call retainers to the castle to work and signal the businesses in the town that working hours had started. It was formerly part of the gate system into the castle, now only it has only a small moat filled with koi.

Izushi is known for being the traditional home of soba noodles in this area of Japan. It was said to have been brought to Izushi with the Sengoku family, when they were transferred by the Ashikaga Shogunate from Shinshu. Izushi soba has three distinctions that are key to its special flavor and consistency: grinding the buckwheat in a special way, kneading it to a certain thickness, and cooking them in a way to prevent them from becoming too soft. The soba should have a simple flavor and a slightly chewy texture. It is served cold, on small plates with a cup of cold broth and several optional ingredients to strengthen the broth flavor, such as grated daikon radish, wasabi, potato paste, chopped green onion, and a raw egg. Using hashi (chopsticks), the cold noodles are taken off one small plate and submerged in the broth cup.

Traditional white porcelain pottery, in Japanese called yakimono, is created and sold in small studio shops in downtown Izushi. The professionally made ceramics in this town are called Izushi yaki.

== See also ==
- Groups of Traditional Buildings
