= Japan National Route 426 =

Road in Japan

National Route 426
- 国道426号
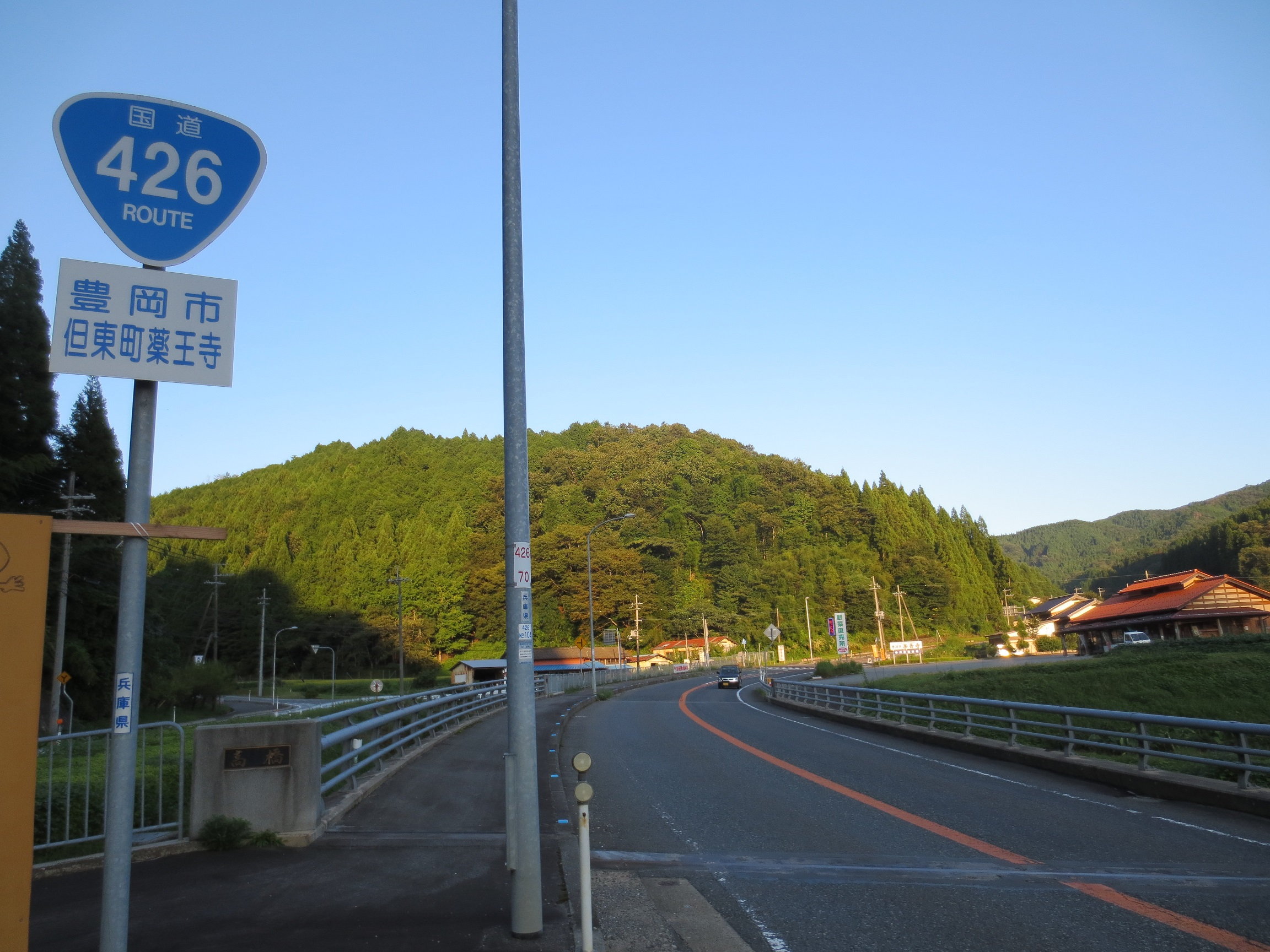

Route information
- Length: 49.6 km (30.8 mi)

Location
- Country: Japan

Highway system
- National highways of Japan; Expressways of Japan
← National Route 425	→ National Route 427

National Route 426 is a national highway of Japan connecting Toyooka, Hyōgo and Fukuchiyama, Kyoto in Japan, with a total length of 49.6 km (30.82 mi).
