= Kajiya Station =

Former Japanese railway station

Coordinates: 35°03′51″N 134°55′27″E

Kajiya Station 鍛冶屋駅
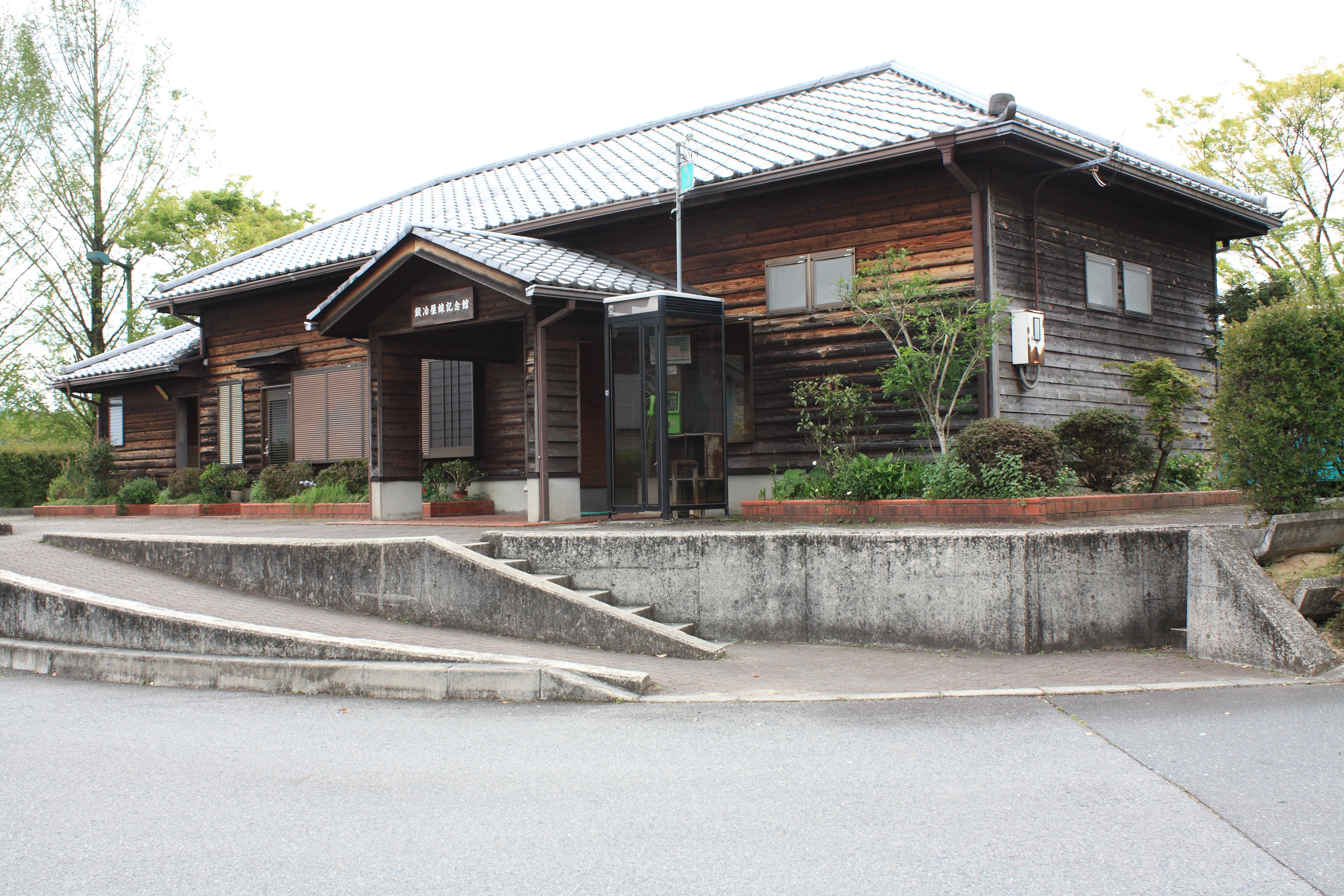
- Preserved station building (April 2017)

General information
- Location: Kajiya, Naka, Taka District, Hyōgo-ken; Japan
- Operator: JR West
- Line: Kajiya Line
- Distance: 13.2 kilometers from Nishiwakishi
- Platforms: 1 side platform

Construction
- Structure type: at grade

Other information
- Status: Unstaffed

History
- Opened: May 6, 1923
- Closed: April 1, 1990
Location

Kajiya Station (鍛冶屋駅, Kajiya-eki) was a railway station in the city of Taka, Hyōgo, Japan, operated by West Japan Railway Company.

== History ==
The station was built by Bansyū Railways in 1923. It was later transferred to Bantan Railways, then bought by Ministry of Railways. Despite Kajiya Line being listed in one of the Deficit 83 Lines, it was not abolished due to high usage between Nishiwakishi Station (named Nomura Station when the line existed) and Nishiwaki Station. However, it was listed for phase 3 of Specified local lines and the entire line was abolished, along with the station.

The station is currently preserved with a KiHa 30 that used to run on the line.

== Adjacent stations ==
West Japan Railway Company
Kajiya Line

Nakamuramachi Station - Kajiya Station
