= Mount Sen =

Mountain in Hyōgo Prefecture, Japan

- 千ヶ峰
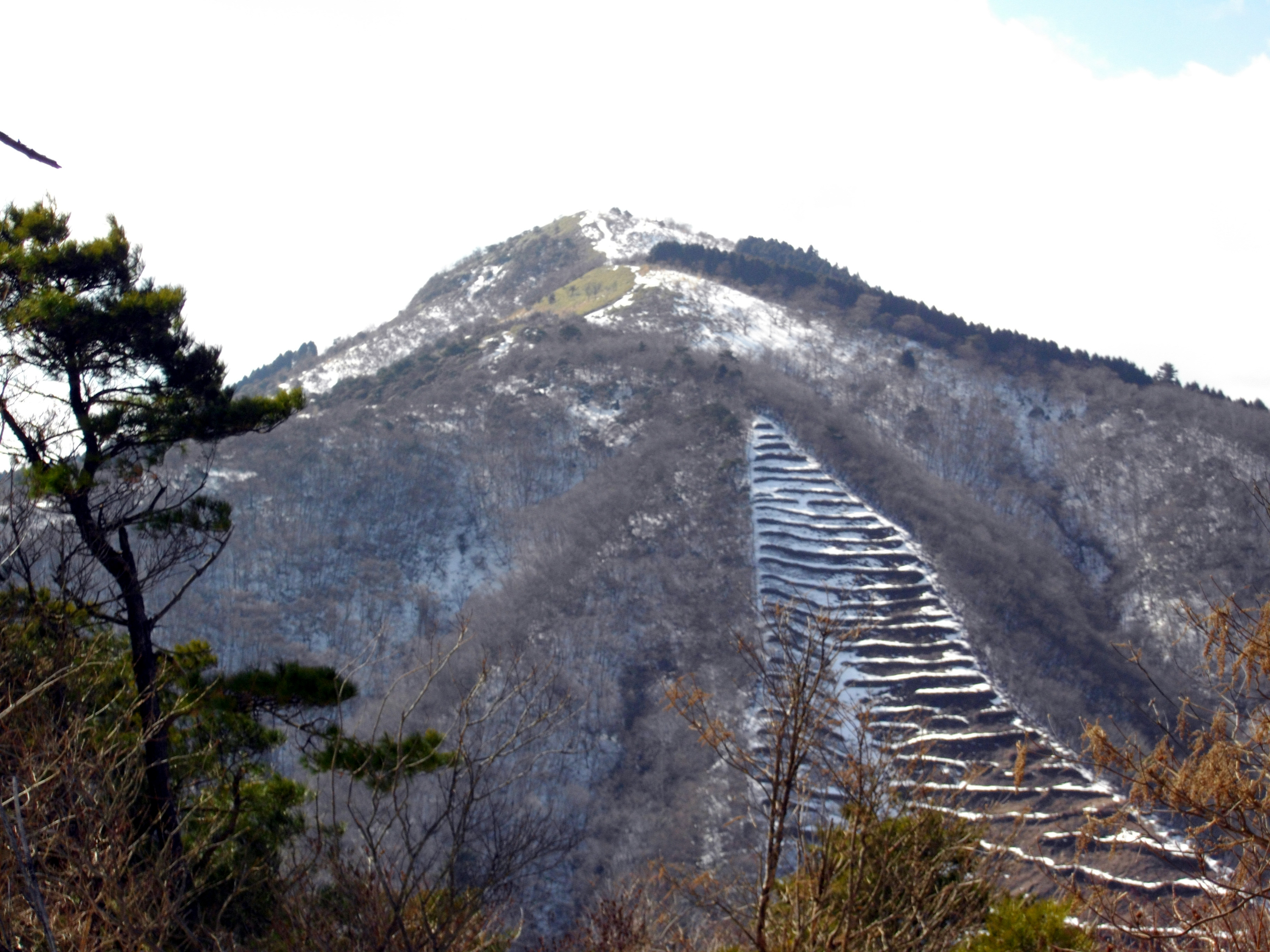
- Mount Sen from Ichihara pass

Highest point
- Elevation: 1,005.2 m (3,298 ft)
- Listing: List of mountains and hills of Japan by height
- Coordinates: 35°8′N 134°53′E

Naming
- Language of name: Japanese
- Pronunciation: [seŋɡamine]

Geography
- Location: Taka and Kamikawa, Hyōgo, Japan
- Parent range: Chūgoku Mountains

Geology
- Mountain type: Fault-block

Mount Sen (千ヶ峰, Sen-ga-mine) is a 1,005.2 m (3,298 ft) mountain of Chūgoku Mountains, located on the border of Taka and Kamikawa, Hyōgo, Japan. This mountain is one of Hyōgo 50 mountains. This mountain is an important center of Kasagatayama-Sengamine Prefectural Natural Park.

== Outline ==
Mount Sen is the easternmost mountain, which is taller than 1000 m in Chugoku Mountains. Mount Sen is a typical fault-block mountain in this area.

On the name of Mount Sen, there are two explanations. One is because it has thousands of peaks (in Japanese ‘sen’ means thousand), however judging from the shape of the mountain, this explanation can not be believed. The other explanation is because the mountain is a mountain for xian. In Japanese, xian (仙) is pronounced ‘sen’.

== Route ==
There are three major routes to the top of this mountain. Mitani route and Iwazashin route start from Kadokura Bus Stop of Shinki Bus. It takes about two and half hours. The other route, Ichinara route is from Tanji Bus Stop, it takes about three hours.

== Access ==
- Kadokura Bus Stop of Shinki Bus
- Tanji Bus Stop of Shinnki Bus

== Gallery ==
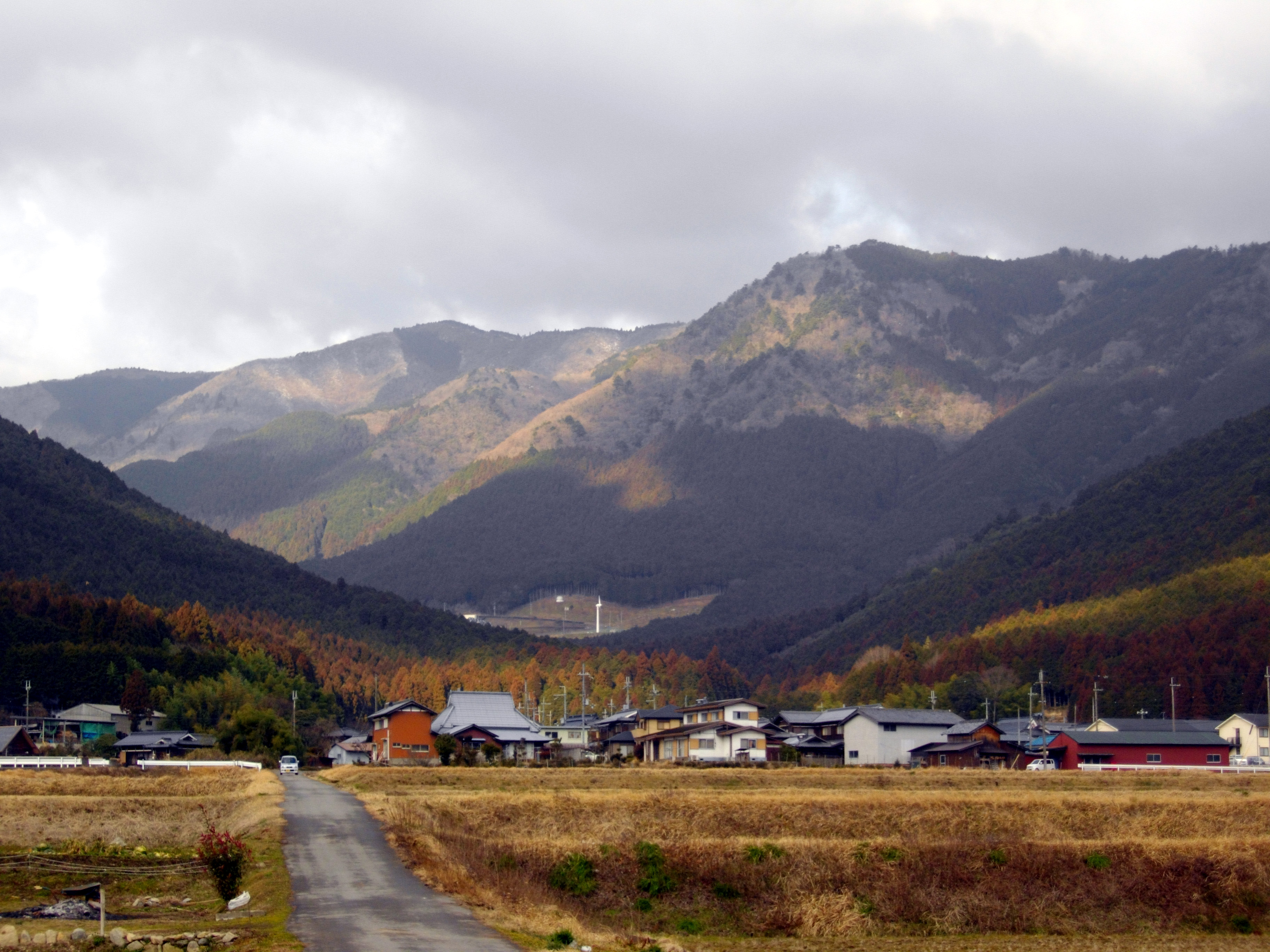
Mount Sen from Kadokura (2/2009)

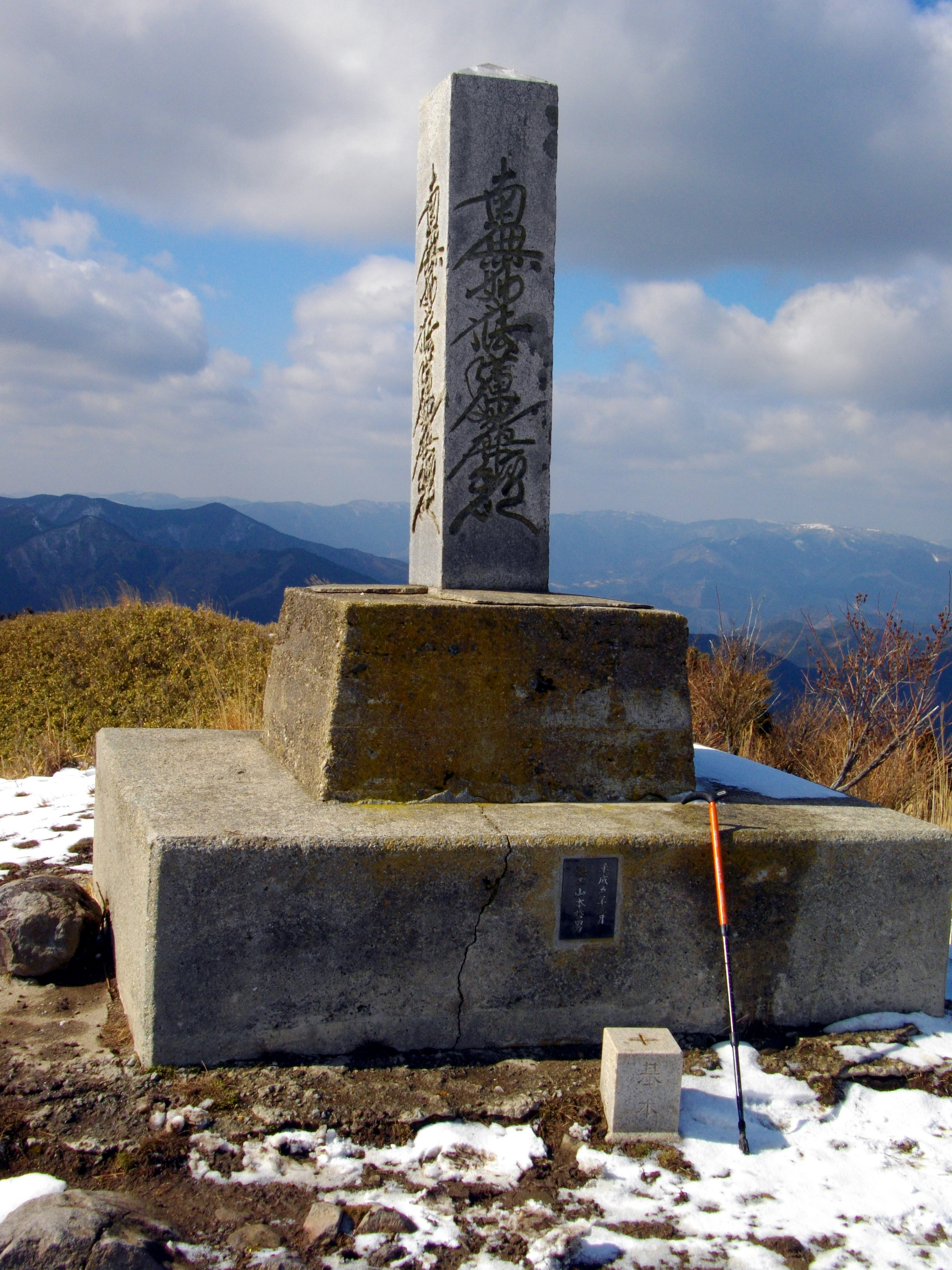
The top of Mount Sen (2/2009)

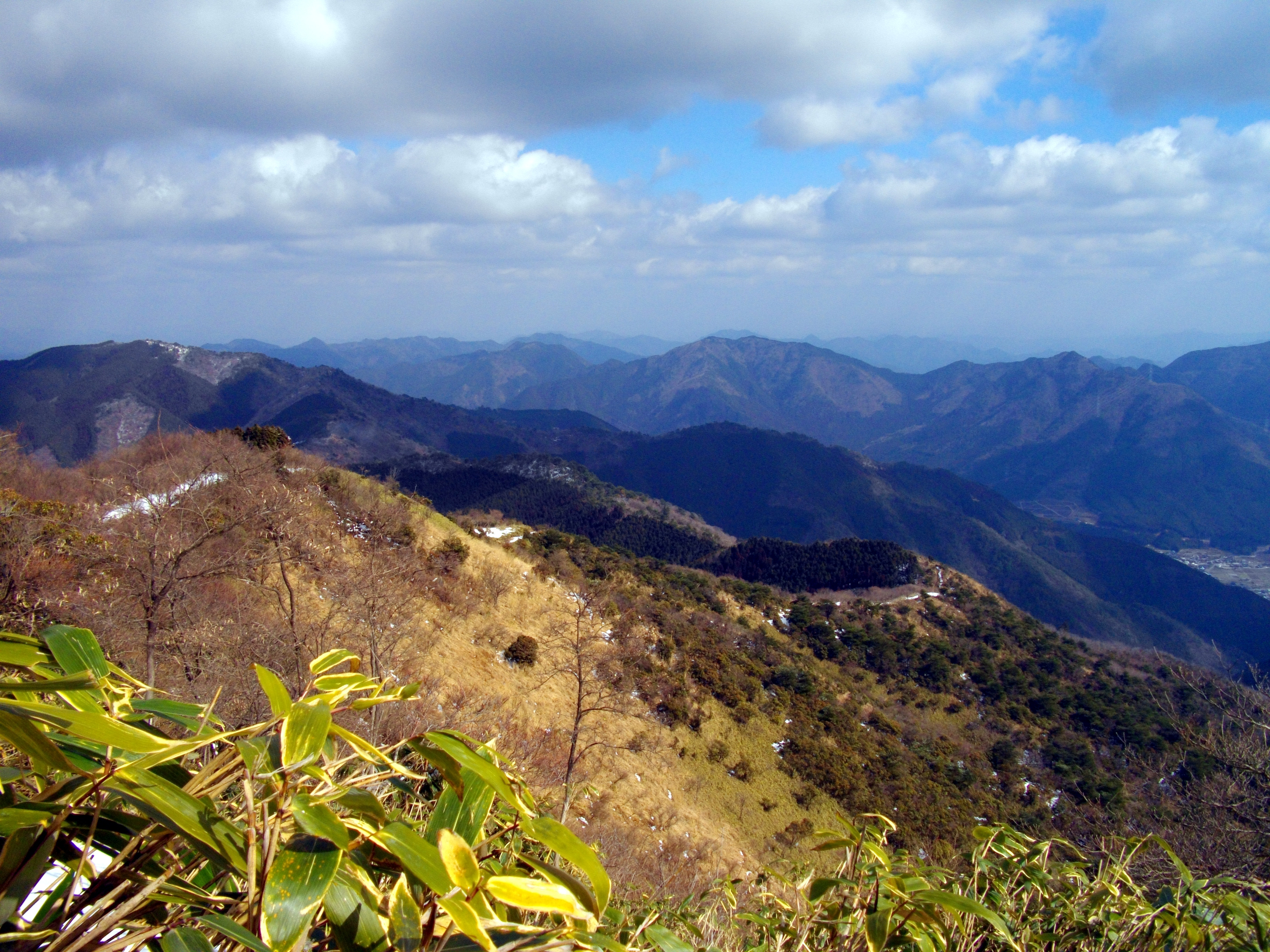
Mount Ryu from the top of Mount Sen (2/2009)

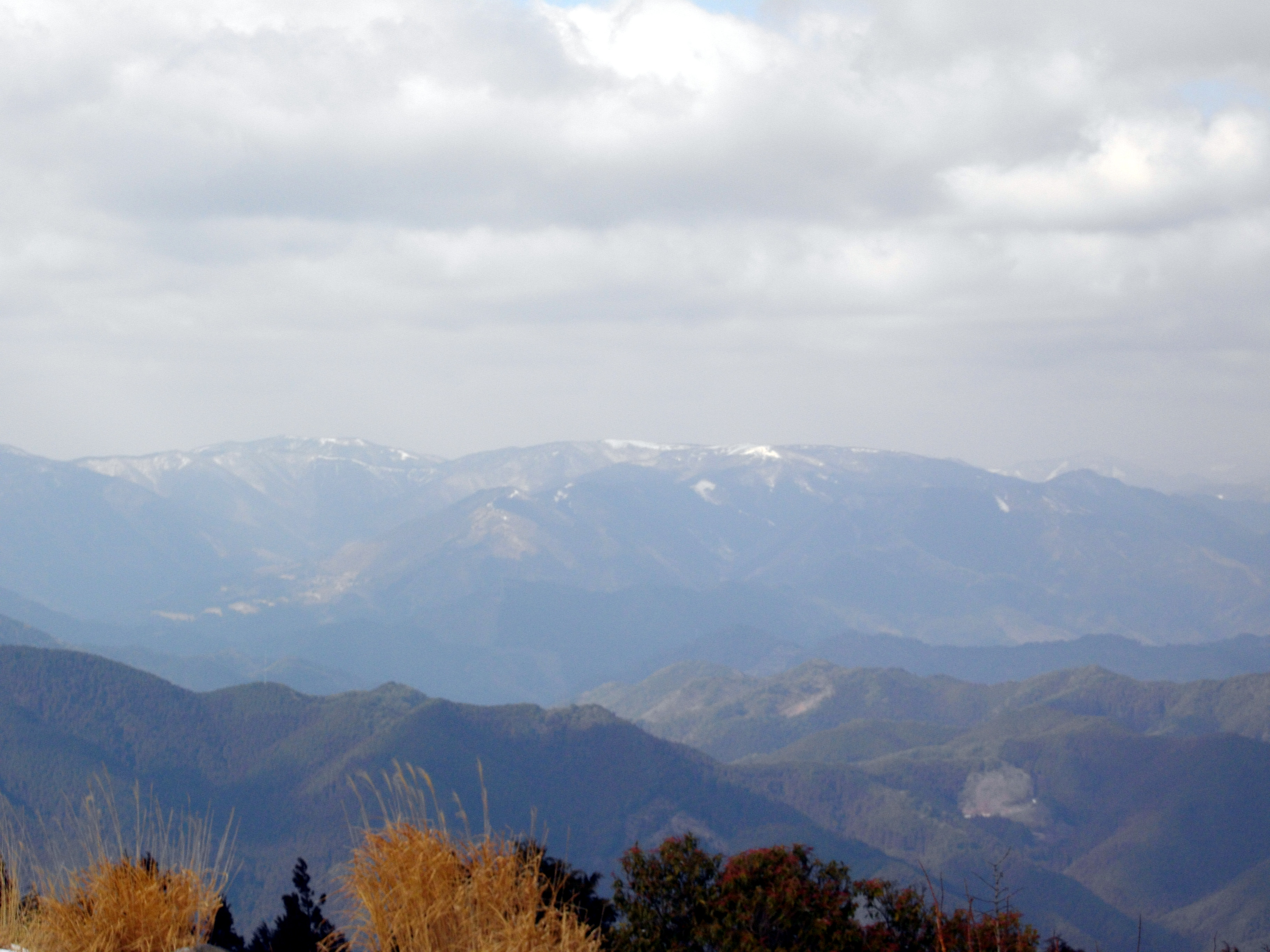
Mount Hyōno from the top of Mount Sen (2/2009)

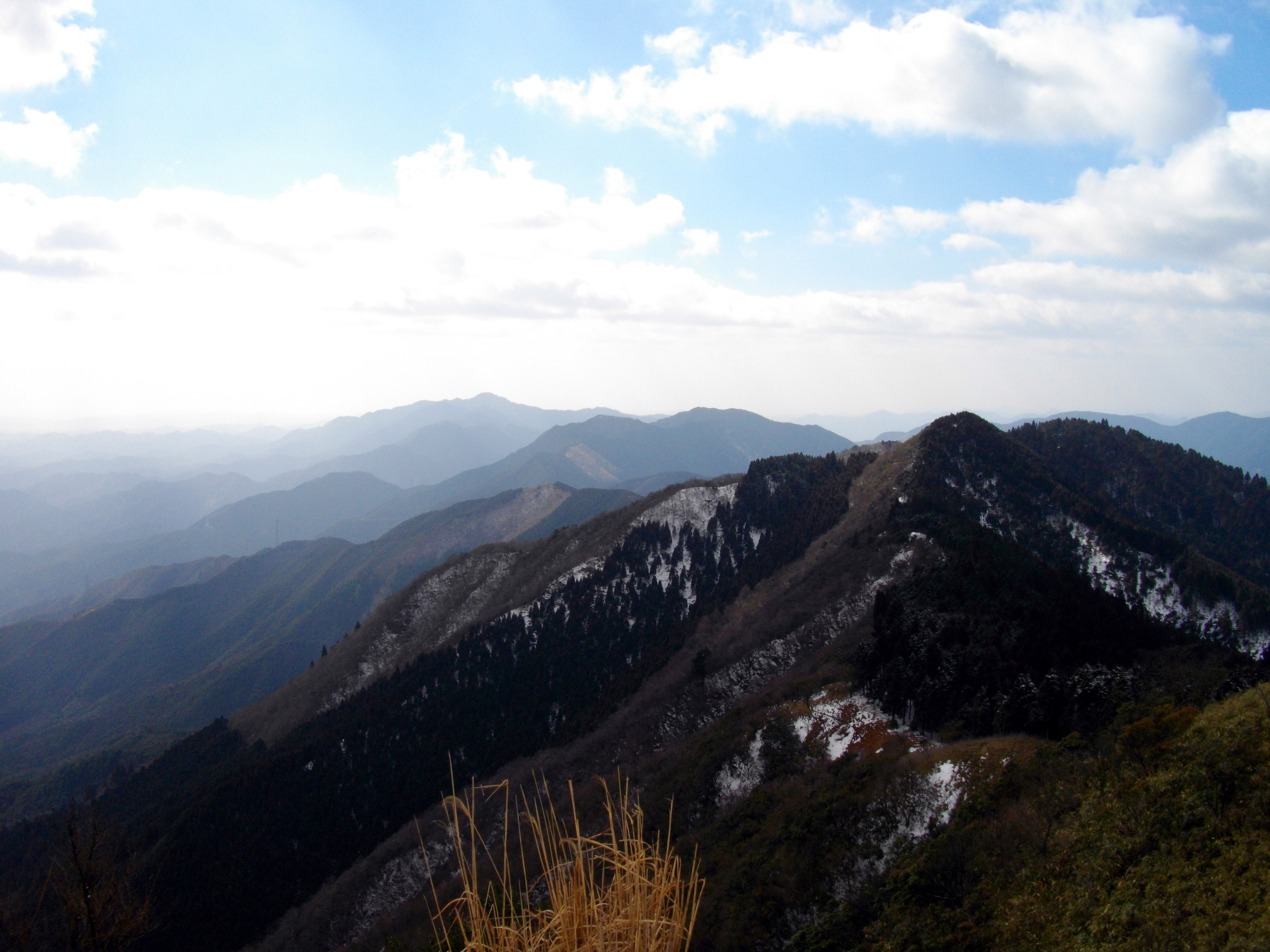
Mount Kasagata from the top of Mount Sen (2/2009)

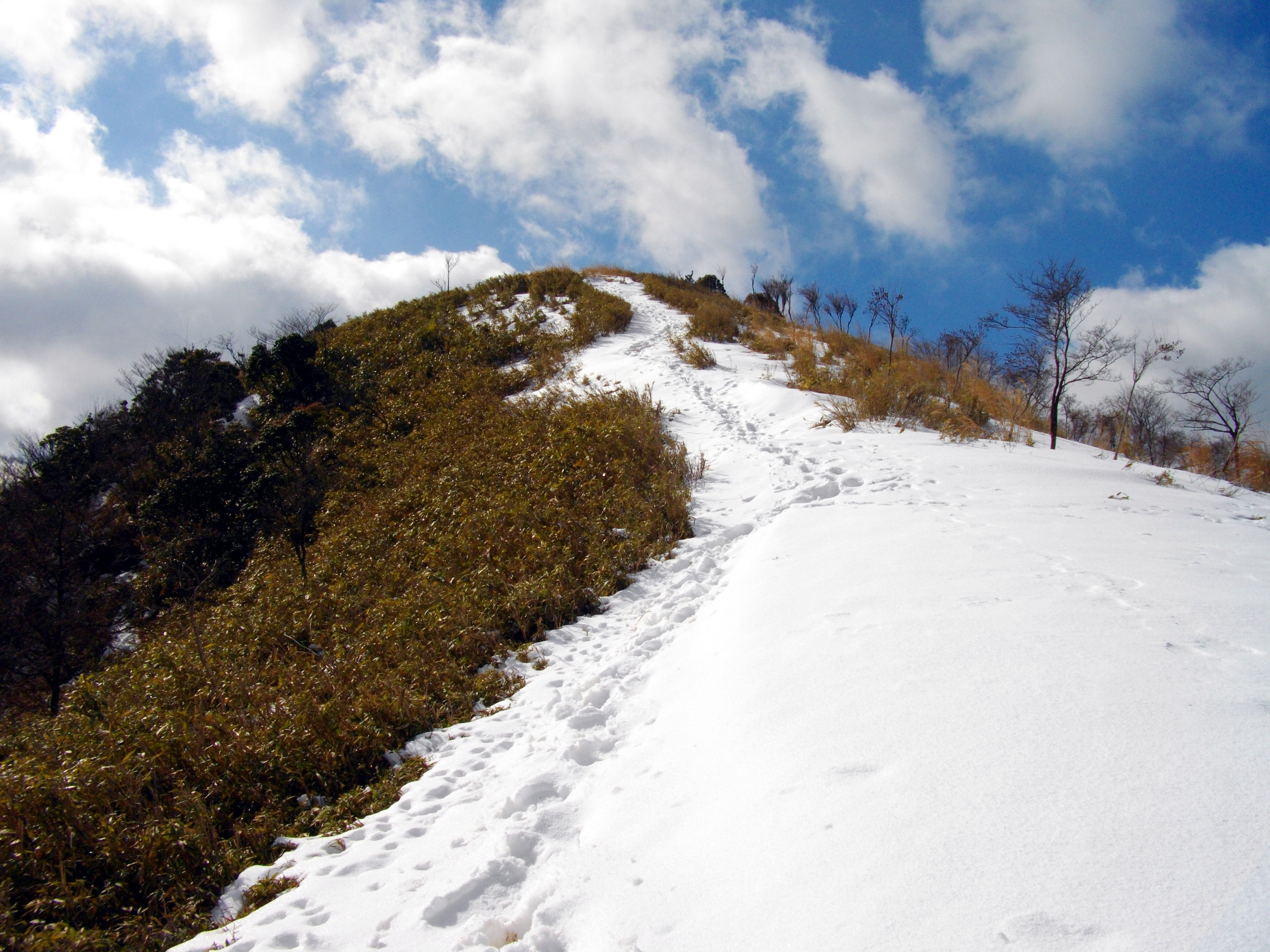
Mount Sen from north (2/2009)

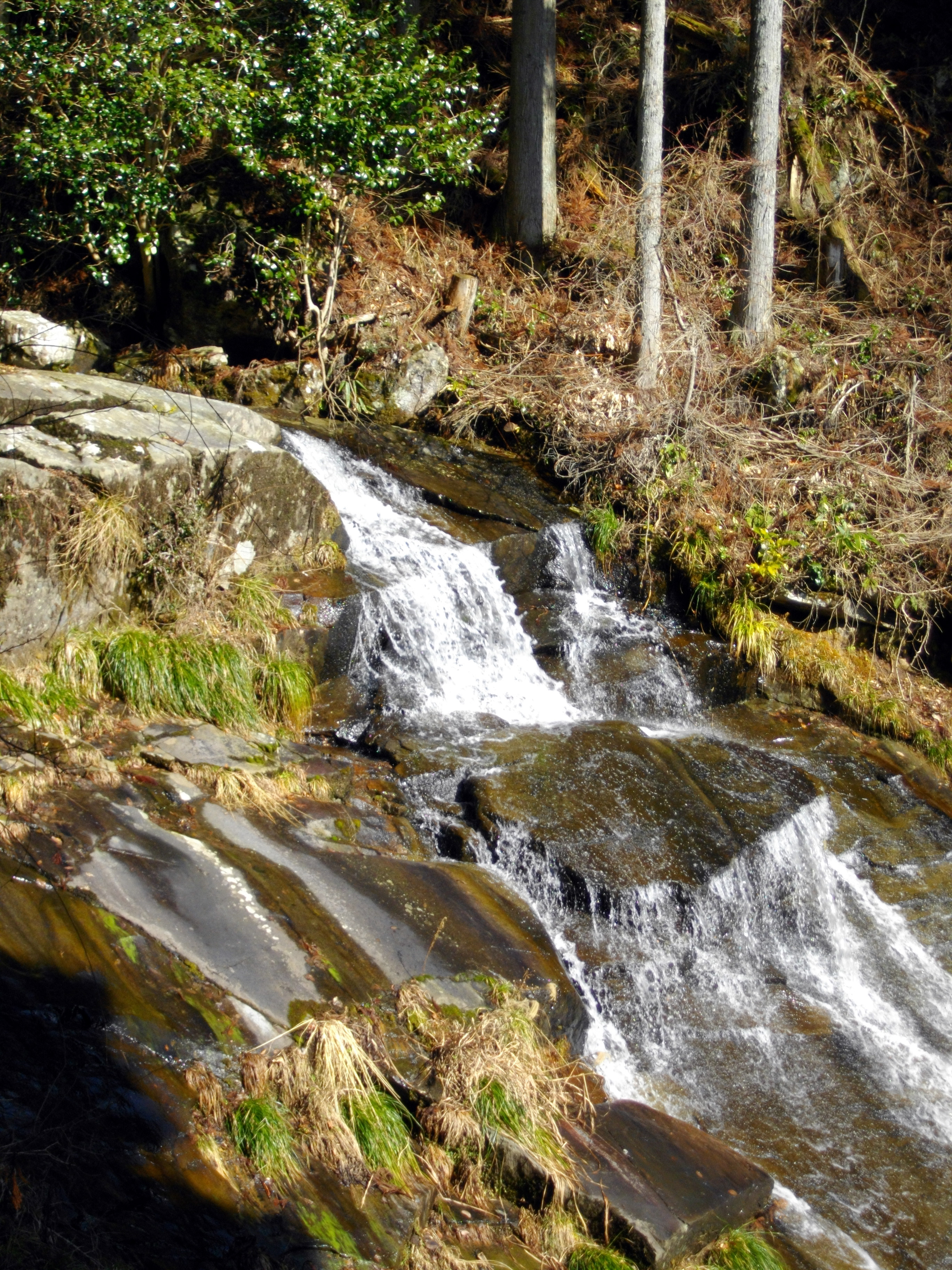
Metaki waterfall of Mitani ravine (2/2009)

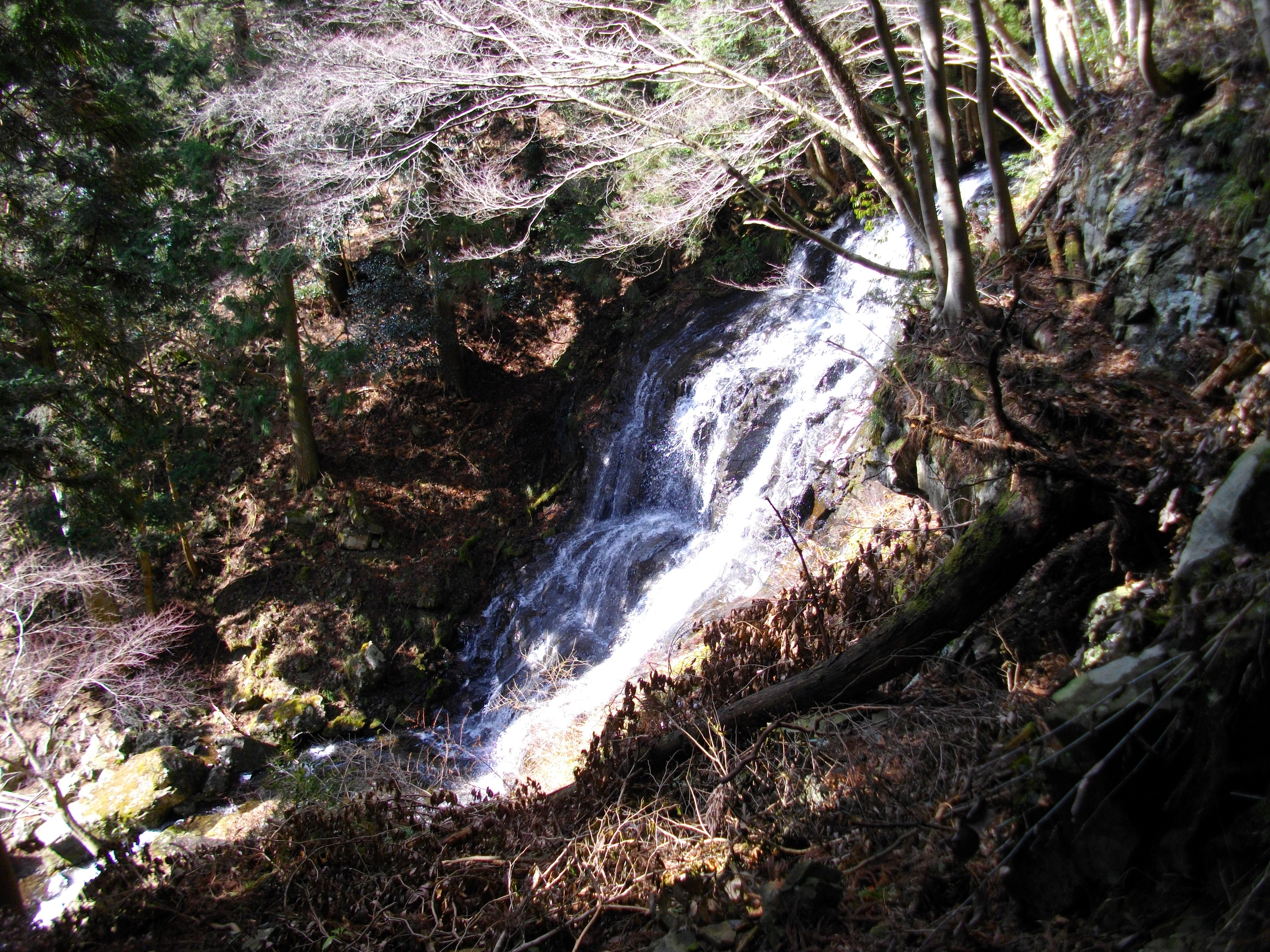
Otaki waterfall of Mitani ravine (2/2009)
