= Kami, Hyōgo =

Kami may refer to:

- Kami, Hyōgo (Mikata)
- Kami, Hyōgo (Taka)
