= Kasagatayama-Sengamine Prefectural Natural Park =

Natural park of Hyogo prefecture, Japan

- 笠形山千ヶ峰県立自然公園
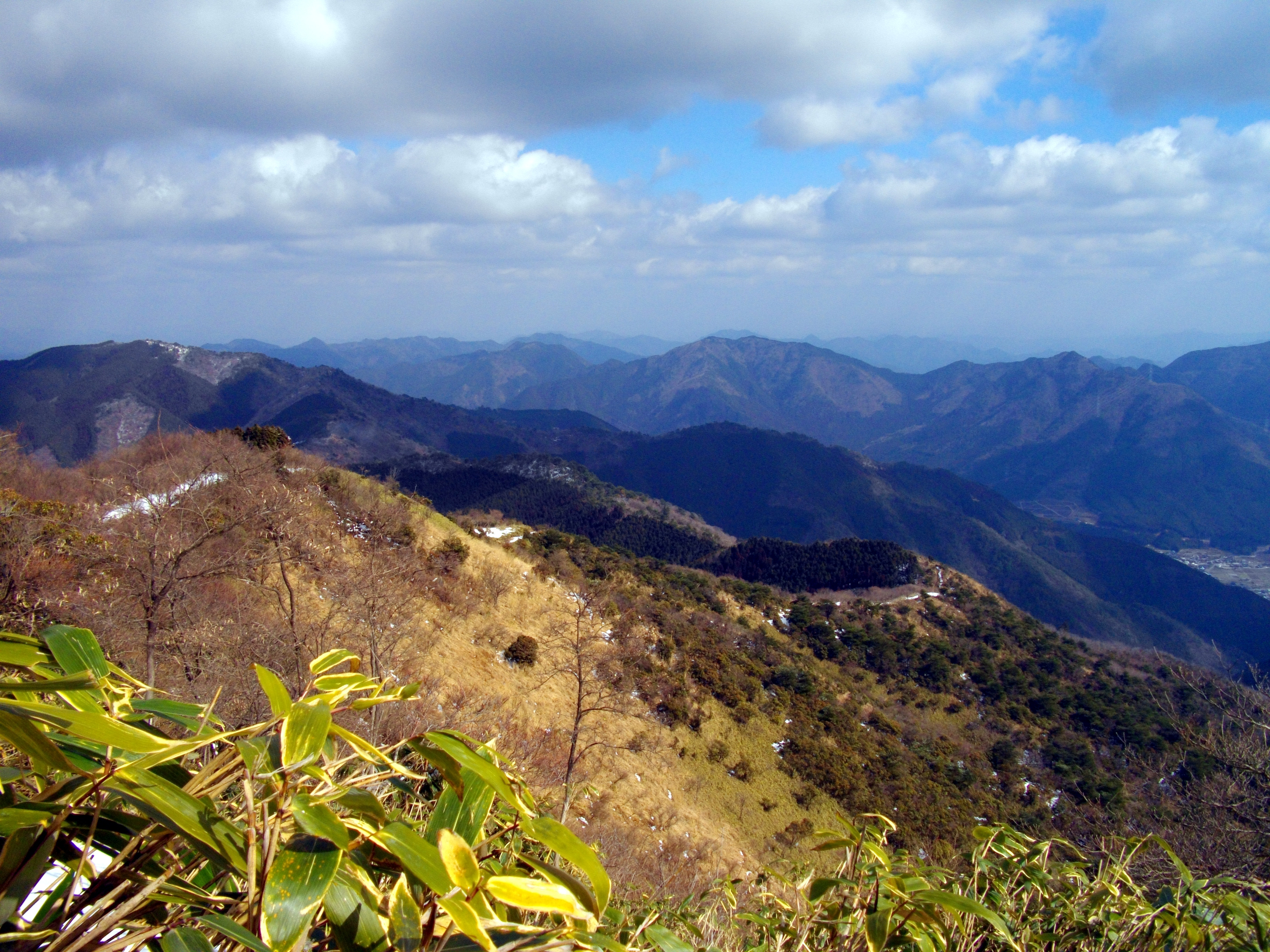
- Mount Sen

- Location within Hyōgo Prefecture Location within Japan
- Location: Hyōgo Prefecture, Japan
- Coordinates: 35.1°N 134.85°E
- Area: 61.50 km^{2} (23.75 sq mi)
- Established: 1 June 1965

Kasagatayama-Sengamine Prefectural Natural Park (笠形山千ヶ峰県立自然公園, Kasagatayama-Sengamine kenritsu shizen kōen) is a Prefectural Natural Park in central Hyōgo Prefecture, Japan. Established in 1965, the park centres upon Mount Kasagata and Mount Sen, and spans the municipalities of Ichikawa, Kamikawa, and Taka.

== See also ==
- National Parks of Japan
