= Wadayama =

Dissolved municipality in Hyōgo prefecture, Japan

Wadayama (和田山町, Wadayama-chō) was a town located in Asago District, Hyōgo Prefecture, Japan.

As of 2003, the town had an estimated population of 17,129 and a density of 153.47 persons per km^{2}. The total area was 111.61 km^{2}.

On April 1, 2005, Wadayama, along with the towns of Asago (former), Ikuno and Santō (all from Asago District), was merged to create the city of Asago and no longer exists as an independent municipality.
