= Shin-Nishiwaki Station =

Railway station in Nishiwaki, Hyōgo Prefecture, Japan

Shin-Nishiwaki Station 新西脇駅
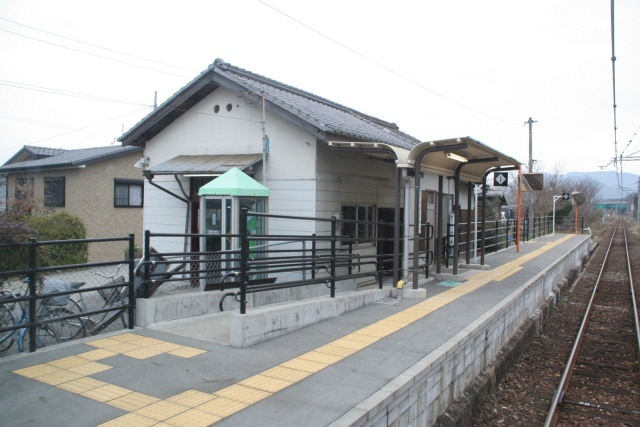
- Shin-Nishiwaki Station in February 2007

General information
- Location: Wabu-chō, Nishiwaki-shi, Hyōgo-ken 677-0053; Japan
- Coordinates: 34.9777°N 134.9777°E
- Operator: JR West
- Line: I Kakogawa Line
- Distance: 32.3 km (20.1 miles) from Kakogawa
- Platforms: 1 side platform
- Tracks: 1
- Connections: Bus stop

Other information
- Status: Unstaffed
- Website: Official website

History
- Opened: 1 October 1925

Passengers
- FY2019: 7 daily

Services
Preceding station	JR West	Following station
Nishiwakishi towards Kakogawa	Kakogawa Line Local	Hie towards Tanikawa
Location
- Location within Hyōgo Prefecture Location within Japan

Shin-Nishiwaki Station (新西脇駅, Shin-Nishiwaki-eki) is a passenger railway station located in the city of Nishiwaki, Hyōgo Prefecture, Japan, operated by West Japan Railway Company (JR West).

== Lines ==
Shin-Nishiwaki Station is served by the Kakogawa Line and is 32.3 kilometers from the terminus of the line at Kakogawa

== Station layout ==
The station consists of one ground-level side platform serving bi-directional track. The station is unattended.

== History ==
Shin-Nishiwaki Station opened on 1 October 1925. With the privatization of the Japan National Railways (JNR) on 1 April 1987, the station came under the aegis of the West Japan Railway Company.

== Passenger statistics ==
In fiscal 2019, the station was used by an average of 7 passengers daily

== Surrounding area ==
- Wabucho Public Hall
- Japan National Route 175 (Nishiwaki Bypass)

== See also ==
- List of railway stations in Japan
