= Asago District =

Former district in Hyōgo prefecture, Japan

Coordinates: 35.23333°N 134.83333°E

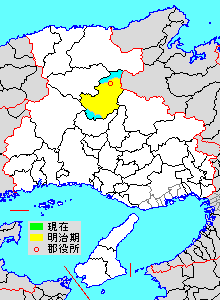
Asago District

Asago District (朝来郡, Asago-gun) was a district located in Hyōgo Prefecture, Japan.

As of March 31, 2005, the district had an estimated population of 35,762. The total area was 402.98 km^{2}.

It was written that there were nine areas Yamaguchi, Kuwaichi, Ita, Katsu, Hirata, Toga, Asago and Awaga in Asago District on Wamyō Ruijushō. It is thought that Ikuno was included in Fudoki for Harima Province.

- November 18, 1878 (Meiji 11): the township and villages law enforcement organization since the merger of towns and villages
- April 1, 1889 (Meiji 22): Mayumi County village from the village
- September 30, 956 (Showa 1931): the adoptive father County town from the south
- April 1, 1957 (Showa 32): the town of Kanzaki County Ookawati Totihara Kawashiri district incorporation
- April 1, 1959 (Showa 34): Wadayama day by the moat from the district town to town adoptive father separation County adoptive father to the border counties have been changed.

Prior to March 31, 2005, the district had 4 towns.

- Asago
- Ikuno
- Santō
- Wadayama

On April 1, 2005, the former town of Asago absorbed the towns of Ikuno, Santō and Wadayama to create the city of Asago. Therefore, Asago District was dissolved as a result of this merger.

== County governments in transition ==
- April 1, 1889 - the areas in Asago District merged to the forms of one town and eight villages.
- April 1, 1926 - the village of Yanase was elevated to town status.
- January 1, 1927 - the village of Takeda was elevated to town status.
- April 10, 1930 - the village of Hirata was elevated to town status (town of Wadayama).
- March 31, 1954 - the town of Yanase, and the villages of Awaga and Youdo were merged (town of Santō).
- March 31, 1954 - the villages of Yamaguchi and Nakagawa were merged (town of Asago).
- March 31, 1955 - the town of Wadayama, and the village of Toga were merged (town of Wadayama).
- September 30, 1956 - the towns of Wadayama, Takeda, and Nantan, Yabu District were merged (town of Wadayama).
- April 1, 1957 - the Kawajiri and Tochihara areas in the town of Ōkawachi, Kanzaki District were incorporated into the town of Ikuno.
- April 1, 1959 - the part of Horihata area in Wadayama town was incorporated into the town of Yabu, Yabu District (Horihata, Yabu)
- April 1, 2005 - The former town of Asago absorbed the towns of Ikuno, Santō and Wadayama were merged to create the city of Asago. Asago District was dissolved as a result of this merger.

== See also ==
- List of dissolved districts of Japan
