= Kanzaki, Hyōgo =

Dissolved municipality in Hyōgo prefecture, Japan

Kanzaki (神崎町, Kanzaki-chō) was a town located in Kanzaki District, Hyōgo Prefecture, Japan.

As of 2003, the town had an estimated population of 8,238 and a density of 78.38 persons per km^{2}. The total area was 105.10 km^{2}.

On November 7, 2005, Kanzaki, along with the town of Ōkawachi (also from Kanzaki District), was merged to create the town of Kamikawa.
