= Yachiyo, Hyōgo =

Dissolved municipality in Hyōgo prefecture, Japan

Yachiyo (八千代町, Yachiyo-chō) was a town located in Taka District, Hyōgo Prefecture, Japan.

As of 2003, the town had an estimated population of 6,262 and a population density of 118.00 persons per km^{2}. The total area was 53.07 km^{2}.

On November 1, 2005, Yachiyo, along with the towns of Kami and Naka (all from Taka District), was merged to create the town of Taka.
