= Santō, Hyōgo =

Dissolved municipality in Hyōgo prefecture, Japan

Santō (山東町, Santō-chō) was a town located in Asago District, Hyōgo Prefecture, Japan.

== Population ==
As of 2003, the town had an estimated population of 6,325 and a density of 128.66 persons per km^{2}. The total area was 49.16 km^{2}.

== History ==
On April 1, 2005, Santō, along with the towns of Asago (former), Ikuno and Wadayama (all from Asago District), was merged to create the city of Asago and no longer exists as an independent municipality.
