= Ikuno =

Dissolved municipality in Asago district, Hyōgo prefecture, Japan

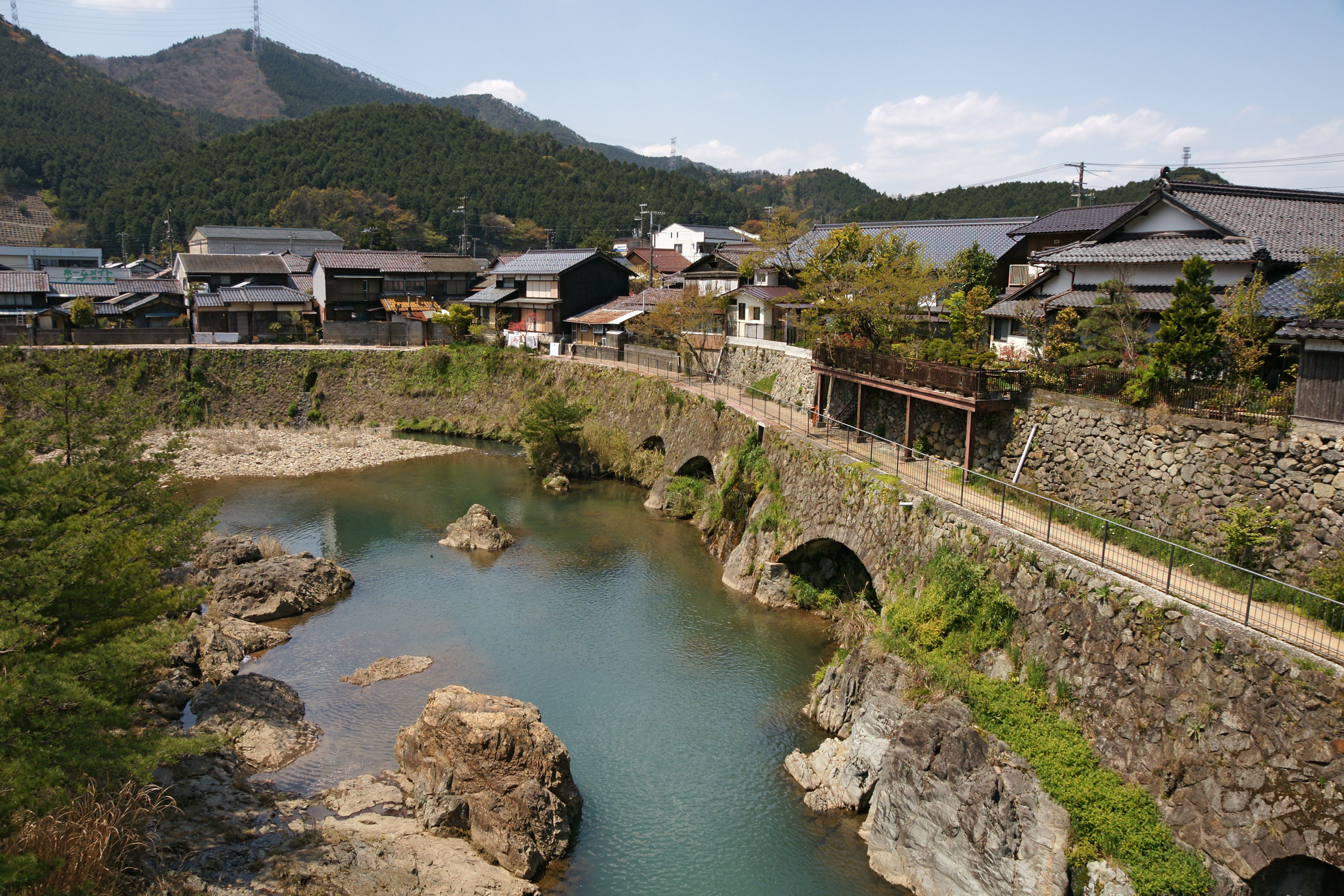
Kuchiganaya area

Ikuno (生野町, Ikuno-chō) was a town located in Asago District, Japan.

As of 2003, the town had an estimated population of 4,872 and a density of 43.50 persons per km^{2}. The total area was 112.01 km^{2}.

On April 1, 2005, Ikuno, along with the towns of Asago (former), Santō and Wadayama (all from Asago District), was merged to create the city of Asago and no longer exists as an independent municipality. It is the smallest town of the Asago District.

== Geography ==
Ikuno is located at the geographical center of Hyogo prefecture. It borders the Harima district and Kamikawa town. Ikuno is elevated 300 meters above sea level and surrounded by mountains which composes 90% of the area. Maruyama river starts here and flows north into the Sea of Japan. Ichikawa river, which originates in Kurogawa (north-east Ikuno) flows through the town centre towards the inland sea.

== Climate ==
The township of Ikuno is located in a basin. During the summer months it remains relatively hot with high humidity levels. Autumn and Spring are short lived seasons. Due to the elevation of Ikuno it receives infrequent bouts of snow. Ikuno receives a lot of rain during the summer months and often ravaged by typhoons. The annual precipitation is approximately 2,000 mm.

== History ==
Mining was Ikuno's first industry, dating back to 807. The discovery of silver in the mountains surrounding the town made it a miner's hub. Mining continued here for nearly a thousand years, during which time copious amounts of copper and silver were mined. The town was a POW camp during WWII. The mines were closed in the 1970s by Mitsubishi. Ikuno's population peaked in 1955 with over 11,000 people.
