= Kugemura Station =

Railway station in Tamba, Hyōgo Prefecture, Japan

Kugemura Station 久下村駅
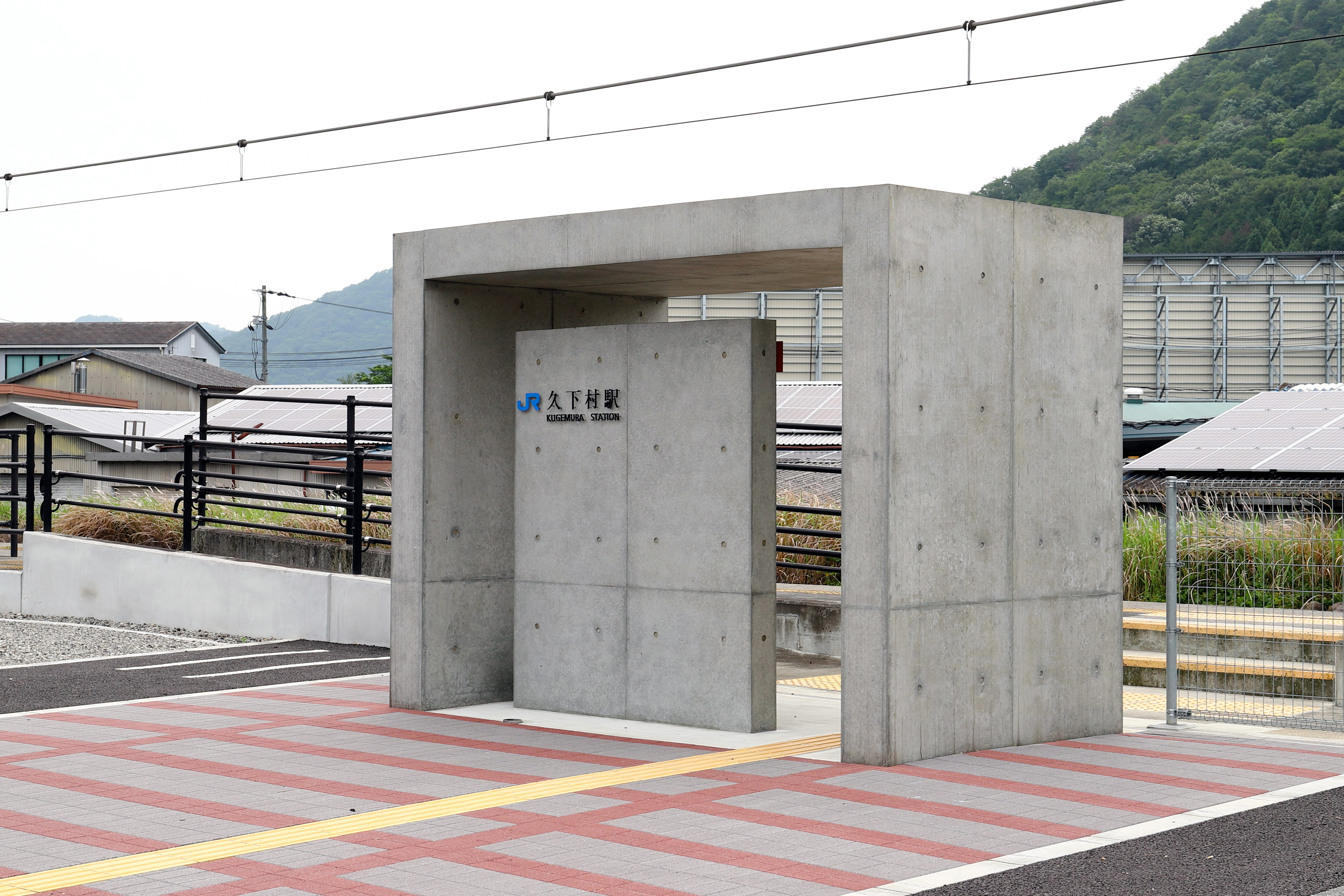
- Kugemura Station in 2020

General information
- Location: Sannocho Tanigawa, Tamba-shi, Hyōgo-ken 669-3131; Japan
- Coordinates: 35.0758°N 135.0305°E
- Owner: West Japan Railway Company
- Operator: West Japan Railway Company
- Line: Kakogawa Line
- Distance: 46.3 km (28.8 miles) from Kakogawa
- Platforms: 1 side platform
- Connections: Bus stop

Construction
- Structure type: Ground level

Other information
- Status: Unstaffed
- Website: Official website

History
- Opened: 27 December 1924

Passengers
- FY2016: 6 daily

Services
Preceding station	JR West	Following station
Funamachiguchi towards Kakogawa	Kakogawa Line Local	Tanikawa Terminus
Location
- Location within Hyōgo Prefecture Location within Japan

Kugemura Station (久下村駅, Kugemura-eki) is a passenger railway station located in the city of Tamba, Hyōgo Prefecture, Japan, operated by West Japan Railway Company (JR West).

== Lines ==
Kugemura Station is served by the Kakogawa Line, and is located 46.3 kilometers from the terminus of the line at Kakogawa.

== Station layout ==
The station consists of one ground-level side platform serving a single bi-directional track. There is no station building, but only a concrete shelter. The station is unattended.

== History ==
Kugemura Station opened on 27 December 1924. With the privatization of the Japan National Railways (JNR) on 1 April 1987, the station came under the aegis of the West Japan Railway Company.

== Passenger statistics ==
In fiscal 2016, the station was used by an average of 6 passengers daily

== Surrounding area ==
- Tamba City Hall Sannan Branch (Sannan Resident Center)
- Tamba Ryu Fossil Studio "Chitan no Yakata"
- Ennokyo Headquarters

== See also ==
- List of railway stations in Japan
