= Central Circuit =

Motor racing circuit in Taka, Hyōgo, Japan

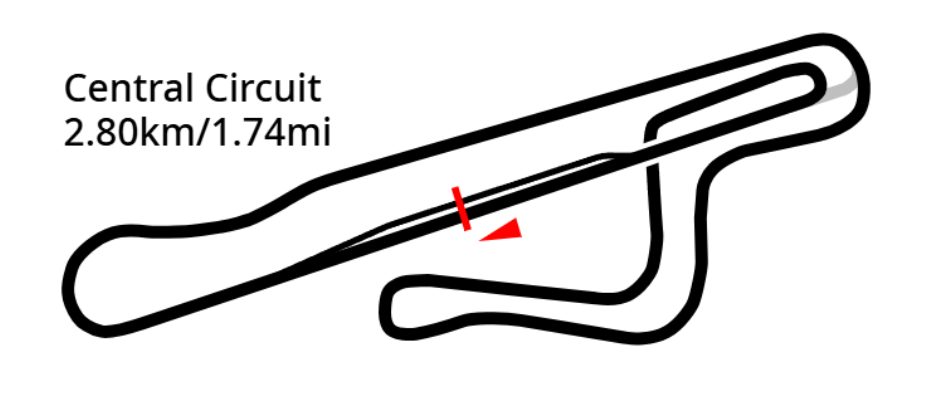
- Full Circuit (1996–present)
- Location: Taka District, Hyōgo, Japan
- Coordinates: 35°01′29.60″N 134°55′19.43″E
- Opened: 1996
- Website: https://central-circuit.com/

Full Circuit (1996–present)
- Length: 2.804 km (1.742 mi)
- Turns: 13
- Race lap record: 1:16.167 ( (Japan) Aguri Suzuki, Nissan Skyline GTR (R33) GT500, 1996, JGTC (GT500))

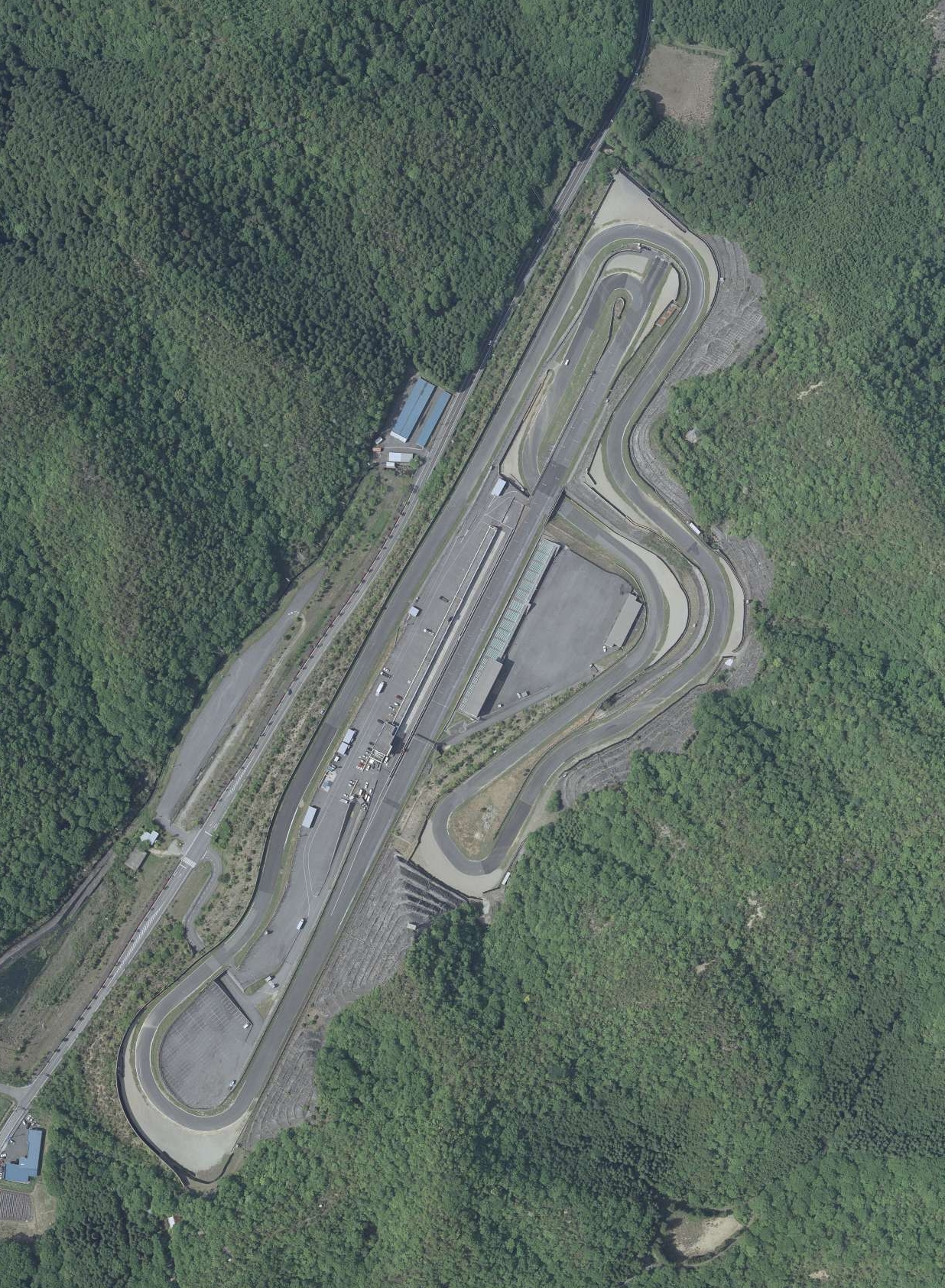
Satellite image of Central Circuit in 2009.

Central Circuit (セントラルサーキット) is a 2.804 km (1.742 mi) motor racing circuit in Taka District, Hyōgo, Japan. It is now used only for occasional karting races, and mainly for private rental. A non championship Super GT race was held here in 1996. The track has hosted the Roadster Cup for Mazda MX-5s since 2022.

The circuit features a crossover, similar to Fiorano Circuit in Italy, Autódromo Juan Manuel Fangio in Argentina, and to Suzuka Circuit and Spa Nishiura Motor Park, the last two also in Japan.

== Lap records ==
The fastest official race lap records at the Central Circuit are listed as:

Category	Time	Driver	Vehicle	Event
Full Circuit (1996–present): 2.804 km (1.742 mi)
JGTC (GT500)	1:16.167	Aguri Suzuki	Nissan Skyline GTR (R33) GT500	1996 Nicos Cup GT Allstar Race
