= Hie Station =

Railway station in Nishiwaki, Hyōgo Prefecture, Japan

Hie Station 比延駅
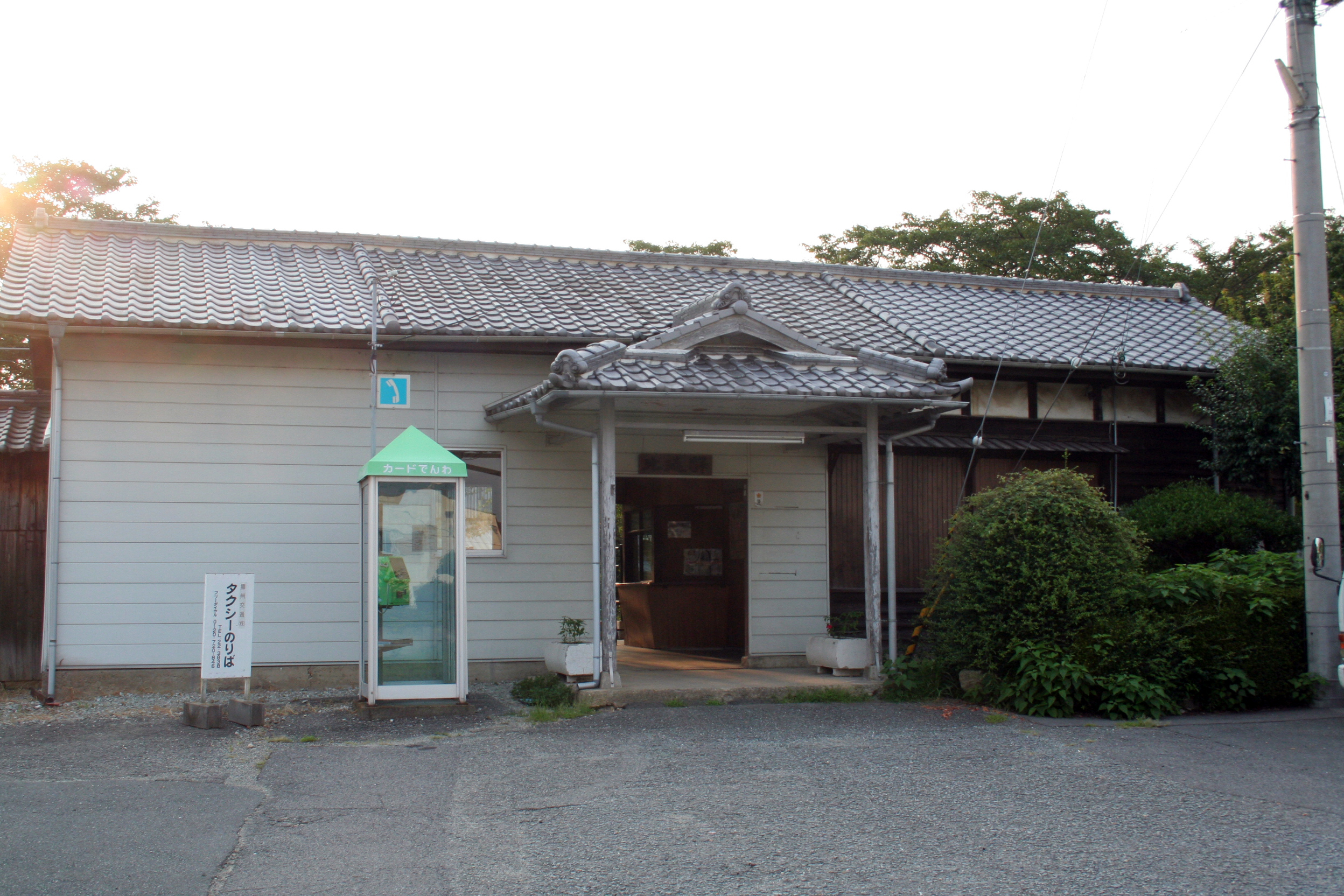
- Hie Station in August 2010

General information
- Location: 189 Shikanochō, Nishiwaki-shi, Hyōgo-ken 677-0033; Japan
- Coordinates: 34.9889°N 134.9956°E
- Operator: JR West
- Line: I Kakogawa Line
- Distance: 34.6 km (21.5 miles) from Kakogawa
- Platforms: 1 side platform
- Connections: Bus stop

Construction
- Structure type: Ground level

Other information
- Status: Unstaffed
- Website: Official website

History
- Opened: 27 December 1924

Passengers
- FY2019: 13 daily

Services
Preceding station	JR West	Following station
Shin-Nishiwaki towards Kakogawa	Kakogawa Line Local	Nihon-heso-koen towards Tanikawa
Location
- Location within Hyōgo Prefecture Location within Japan

Hie Station (Japanese: 比延駅, Hepburn: Hie-eki) is a passenger railway station located in the city of Nishiwaki, Hyōgo Prefecture, Japan, operated by West Japan Railway Company (JR West).

== Lines ==
Hie Station is served by the Kakogawa Line and is 34.6 kilometers from the terminus of the line at Kakogawa

== Station layout ==
The station consists of one ground-level side platform serving bi-directional track. The station is unattended.

== History ==
Hie Station opened on 27 December 1924. With the privatization of the Japan National Railways (JNR) on 1 April 1987, the station came under the aegis of the West Japan Railway Company.

== Passenger statistics ==
In fiscal 2019, the station was used by an average of 13 passengers daily

== Surrounding area ==
- Banshu Textile Industry Cooperative
- Shiroyama Park
- Nishiwaki Municipal Nishiwaki Higashi Junior High School
- Nishiwaki City Hiecho Elementary School

== See also ==
- List of railway stations in Japan
