= Funamachiguchi Station =

Railway station in Nishiwaki, Hyōgo Prefecture, Japan

Funamachiguchi Station 船町口駅
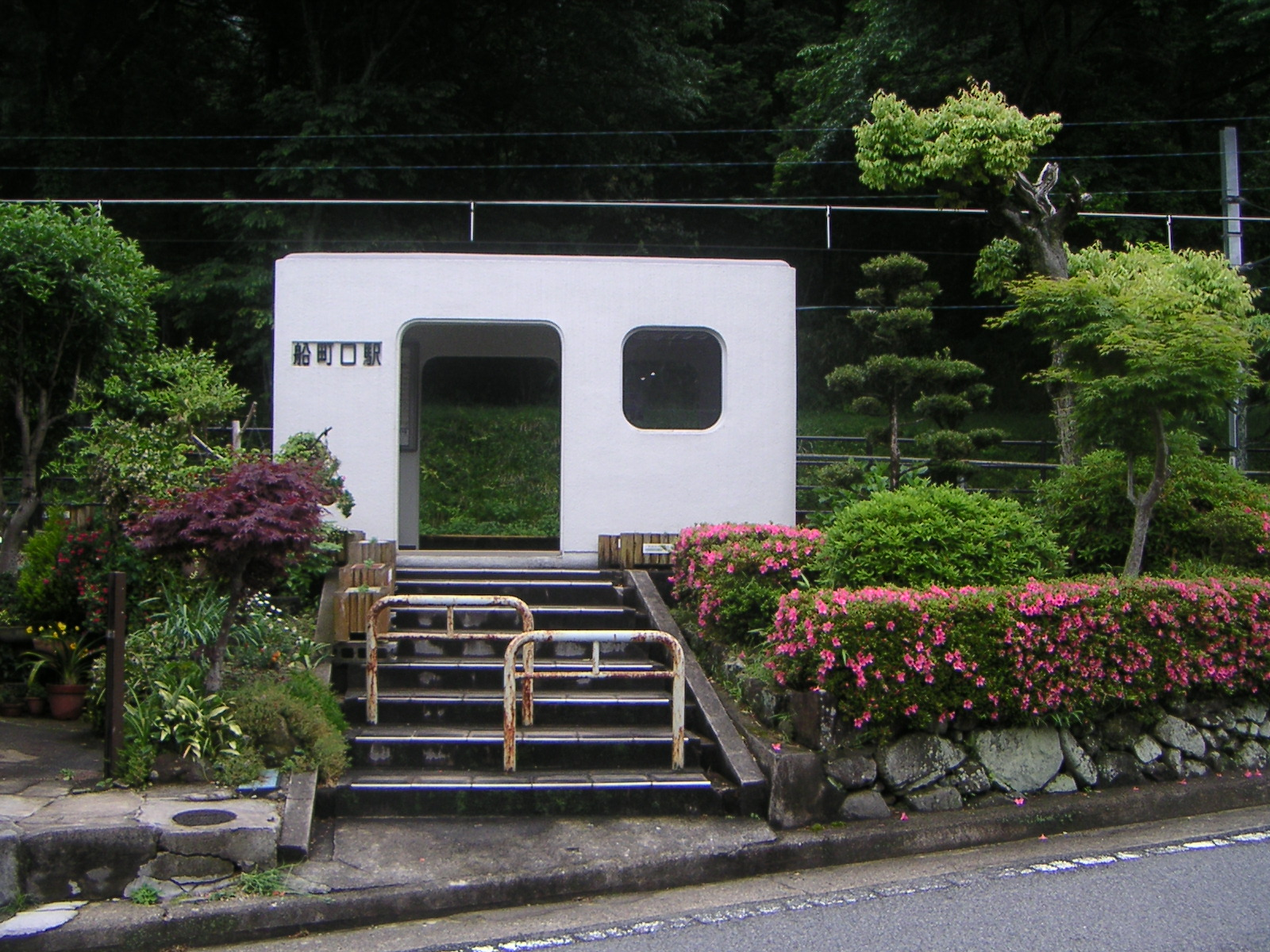

General information
- Location: Nishiwaki, Hyōgo Prefecture; Japan
- Coordinates: 35.0631°N 135.0094°E
- Operator: JR West
- Line: I Kakogawa Line
- Tracks: 1

Other information
- Website: Official website

Services
Preceding station	JR West	Following station
Hon-Kuroda towards Kakogawa	Kakogawa Line Local	Kugemura towards Tanikawa
Location
- Location within Hyōgo Prefecture Location within Japan

Funamachiguchi Station (船町口駅, Funamachiguchi-eki) is a railway station in Nishiwaki, Hyōgo Prefecture, Japan, operated by West Japan Railway Company (JR West).

== Lines ==
Funamachiguchi Station is served by the Kakogawa Line.

== Station layout ==
The station consists of a single side platform. The station is unmanned and has no facilities. The station building is of a capsule style, which was a first of its kind when it was constructed.

== History ==
The station opened on December 27, 1924. The station building was re-built to its current capsule style in 1976.

== See also ==
- List of railway stations in Japan
