= Nishiwaki =

Nishiwaki 西脇市
- City
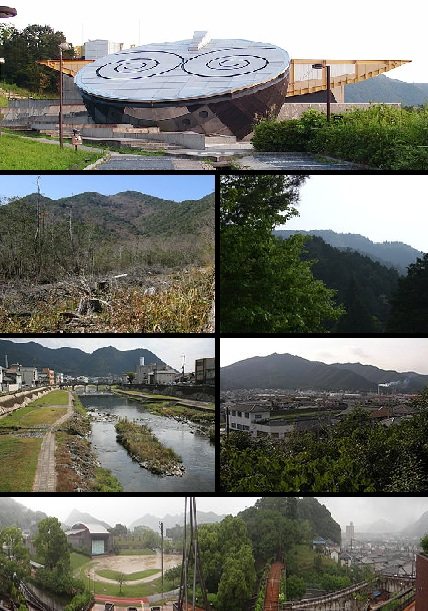
Nihon Heso Koen
| Mount Saikoji | Mount Myokenzan |
| Sugihara River | downtown Nishiwaki |
Dojiyama Park panorama
- Flag Emblem

- Location of Nishiwaki in Hyōgo Prefecture

- Location in Japan
- Coordinates: 34°59′25″N 134°58′20″E
- Country: Japan
- Region: Kansai
- Prefecture: Hyōgo

Government
  - Mayor: Shozo Kataoka (since November 2013)

Area
  - Total: 132.44 km^{2} (51.14 sq mi)

Population (May 1, 2022)
  - Total: 39,001
  - Density: 294.48/km^{2} (762.70/sq mi)
- Time zone: UTC+09:00 (JST)
- City hall address: Gonose 605, Nishiwaki-shi, Hyōgo-ken 677-8511
- Climate: Cfa
- Website: Official website
- Symbols
- Flower: Phlox subulata
- Tree: Cherry blossom

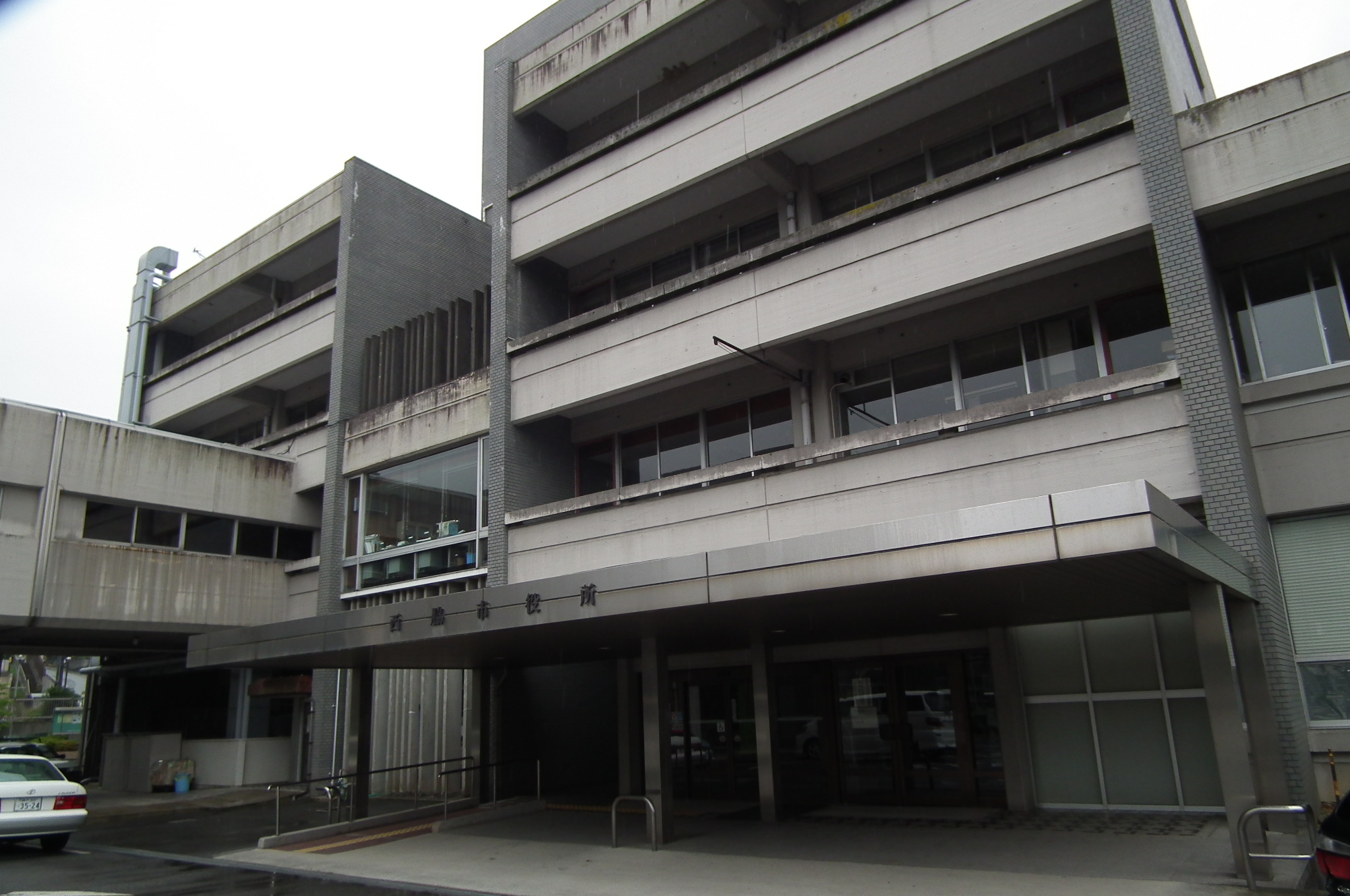
Nishiwaki City Office

Nishiwaki (西脇市, Nishiwaki-shi) is a city in Hyōgo Prefecture, Japan. As of 1 May 2022, the city had an estimated population of 39,001 in 17210 households and a population density of 290 persons per km^{2}. The total area of the city is 132.44 square kilometres (51.14 sq mi). The city calls itself "The Navel of Japan (Nihon no Heso)." Located at the crossing of the 135° East meridian and the 35° North parallel, the city's Nihon no Heso Park marks the center of the nation

== Geography ==
Nishiwaki is located in the northern Harima region of Hyōgo prefecture, about 50 kilometers north of Kobe city, bordered by the Chugoku Mountains to the north. The Kakogawa River, Sugihara River, and the Noma River flow through the city,

=== Neighbouring municipalities ===
Hyōgo Prefecture

- Kasai
- Katō
- Sasayama
- Taka
- Tanba

=== Climate ===
Nishiwaki has a humid subtropical climate (Köppen climate classification Cfa) with hot summers and cool to cold winters. Precipitation is significantly higher in summer than in winter, though on the whole lower than most parts of Honshū, and there is no significant snowfall. The average annual temperature in Nishiwaki is 14.5 °C (58.1 °F). The average annual rainfall is 2,213.5 mm (87.15 in) with July as the wettest month. The temperatures are highest on average in August, at around 26.8 °C (80.2 °F), and lowest in January, at around 3.1 °C (37.6 °F). The highest temperature ever recorded in Nishiwaki was 39.2 °C (102.6 °F) on 30 August 2020; the coldest temperature ever recorded was −8.6 °C (16.5 °F) on 3 February 2012.

Climate data for Nishiwaki (1991−2020 normals, extremes 1978−present)
| Month | Jan | Feb | Mar | Apr | May | Jun | Jul | Aug | Sep | Oct | Nov | Dec | Year |
|---|---|---|---|---|---|---|---|---|---|---|---|---|---|
| Record high °C (°F) | 18.7 (65.7) | 21.2 (70.2) | 24.2 (75.6) | 30.0 (86.0) | 32.3 (90.1) | 35.3 (95.5) | 39.0 (102.2) | 39.5 (103.1) | 37.9 (100.2) | 33.2 (91.8) | 25.4 (77.7) | 21.6 (70.9) | 39.5 (103.1) |
| Mean daily maximum °C (°F) | 8.8 (47.8) | 9.7 (49.5) | 13.6 (56.5) | 19.5 (67.1) | 24.3 (75.7) | 27.3 (81.1) | 30.8 (87.4) | 32.7 (90.9) | 28.2 (82.8) | 22.5 (72.5) | 16.7 (62.1) | 11.2 (52.2) | 20.4 (68.8) |
| Daily mean °C (°F) | 3.1 (37.6) | 3.9 (39.0) | 7.3 (45.1) | 12.7 (54.9) | 17.8 (64.0) | 21.8 (71.2) | 25.7 (78.3) | 26.8 (80.2) | 22.8 (73.0) | 16.7 (62.1) | 10.5 (50.9) | 5.2 (41.4) | 14.5 (58.1) |
| Mean daily minimum °C (°F) | −1.4 (29.5) | −1.1 (30.0) | 1.6 (34.9) | 6.4 (43.5) | 11.8 (53.2) | 17.3 (63.1) | 21.9 (71.4) | 22.7 (72.9) | 18.7 (65.7) | 12.0 (53.6) | 5.6 (42.1) | 0.6 (33.1) | 9.7 (49.4) |
| Record low °C (°F) | −8.0 (17.6) | −8.6 (16.5) | −5.8 (21.6) | −2.8 (27.0) | 0.6 (33.1) | 7.2 (45.0) | 14.8 (58.6) | 14.9 (58.8) | 8.1 (46.6) | 1.4 (34.5) | −2.8 (27.0) | −8.1 (17.4) | −8.6 (16.5) |
| Average precipitation mm (inches) | 47.1 (1.85) | 62.1 (2.44) | 112.2 (4.42) | 123.4 (4.86) | 151.2 (5.95) | 177.2 (6.98) | 212.2 (8.35) | 149.6 (5.89) | 190.2 (7.49) | 132.0 (5.20) | 73.8 (2.91) | 58.7 (2.31) | 1,509.3 (59.42) |
| Average precipitation days (≥ 1.0 mm) | 6.4 | 7.2 | 9.9 | 9.8 | 10.2 | 11.7 | 11.5 | 8.9 | 10.5 | 8.0 | 6.3 | 7.0 | 107.4 |
| Mean monthly sunshine hours | 140.9 | 130.4 | 162.3 | 187.9 | 185.4 | 130.1 | 138.0 | 195.7 | 151.5 | 164.6 | 150.2 | 141.4 | 1,872.5 |
Source: Japan Meteorological Agency

=== Demographics ===
Per Japanese census data, the population of Nishiwaki in 2020 is 38,673 people. Nishiwaki has been conducting censuses since 1920.

Historical population
| Year | Pop. | ±% |
|---|---|---|
| 1920 | 20,987 | — |
| 1925 | 22,392 | +6.7% |
| 1930 | 25,656 | +14.6% |
| 1935 | 29,737 | +15.9% |
| 1940 | 32,083 | +7.9% |
| 1945 | 37,160 | +15.8% |
| 1950 | 42,516 | +14.4% |
| 1955 | 48,012 | +12.9% |
| 1960 | 51,173 | +6.6% |
| 1965 | 48,481 | −5.3% |
| 1970 | 45,964 | −5.2% |
| 1975 | 46,182 | +0.5% |
| 1980 | 46,380 | +0.4% |
| 1985 | 46,889 | +1.1% |
| 1990 | 46,220 | −1.4% |
| 1995 | 46,339 | +0.3% |
| 2000 | 45,718 | −1.3% |
| 2005 | 43,953 | −3.9% |
| 2010 | 42,812 | −2.6% |
| 2015 | 40,866 | −4.5% |
| 2020 | 38,673 | −5.4% |
Nishiwaki population statistics

== History ==
The area of Nishiwaki was in ancient Harima Province. In the Edo Period, most of the area was tenryō territory under direct administration of the Tokugawa shogunate. Following the Meiji restoration, the village of Sugata, was created within Taka District, Hyōgo with the creation of the modern municipalities system April 1, 1889. It was raised to town status on November 1, 1917, changing its name to Nishiwaki. On April 1, 1952 Nishiwaki merged with the neighboring villages of Hino, Shigeharu, and Hiesho to form the city of Nishiwaki. On October 1, 2005, the town of Kurodashō (from Taka District) was merged into Nishiwaki.

== Government ==
Nishiwaki has a mayor-council form of government with a directly elected mayor and a unicameral city council of 16 members. Nishiwaki, together with the town of Taki, contributes one member to the Hyogo Prefectural Assembly. In terms of national politics, the city is part of Hyōgo 4th district of the lower house of the Diet of Japan.

== Economy ==
From the middle of the Edo period (1792), the area has been noted for the production of a striped cloth per a technique introduced from Nishijin in Kyoto, called "Banshu weaving". In the latter half of the Meiji era became known nationwide, and still has a share of more than 70% of domestic yarn-dyed textiles. Other noted products include the production of Kobe beef.

== Education ==
Nishiwaki has eight public elementary schools and four public middle schools operated by the city government and three public high schools operated by the Hyōgo Prefectural Department of Education.

== Transportation ==
=== Railway ===
JR West - Kakogawa Line

- Nishiwakishi - Shin-Nishiwaki - Hie - Nihon-heso-kōen - Kurodashō - Hon-Kuroda - Funamachiguchi

=== Highways ===
- National Route 175
- National Route 427

== Sister cities ==
Street sign in Renton, WA commemorating its sister city

- Renton, Washington, United States, since 1969. Since then there have been mutual exchanges between the cities, most notably the annual middle school exchange program which began in 1989 (the US delegation was in Japan October 3–13, 1989).

== Culture ==
=== Mascots ===
Nisshi (にっしー) was made to promote the city in 2010, and she wears a blue clothes made of "Banshu-Ori", which is a kind of textile and famous in Nisiwaki city.

Sakura (さくら) is Nisshi's sister and wears pink clothes.

Heso-no-Kanchan (へそのかんちゃん) was made to promote a historical drama, Gunshi-Kanbe (軍師官兵衛), which had been broadcast in 2014. "Kanchan" was designed after the model of Kanbe's appearance in his childhood.

== Notable people from Nishiwaki ==
- Iwaichi Fujiwara, army general
- Yoshinori Tokura, physicist
- Tadanori Yokoo, graphic designer
