= Hon-Kuroda Station =

Railway station in Nishiwaki, Hyōgo Prefecture, Japan

Hon-Kuroda Station 本黒田駅
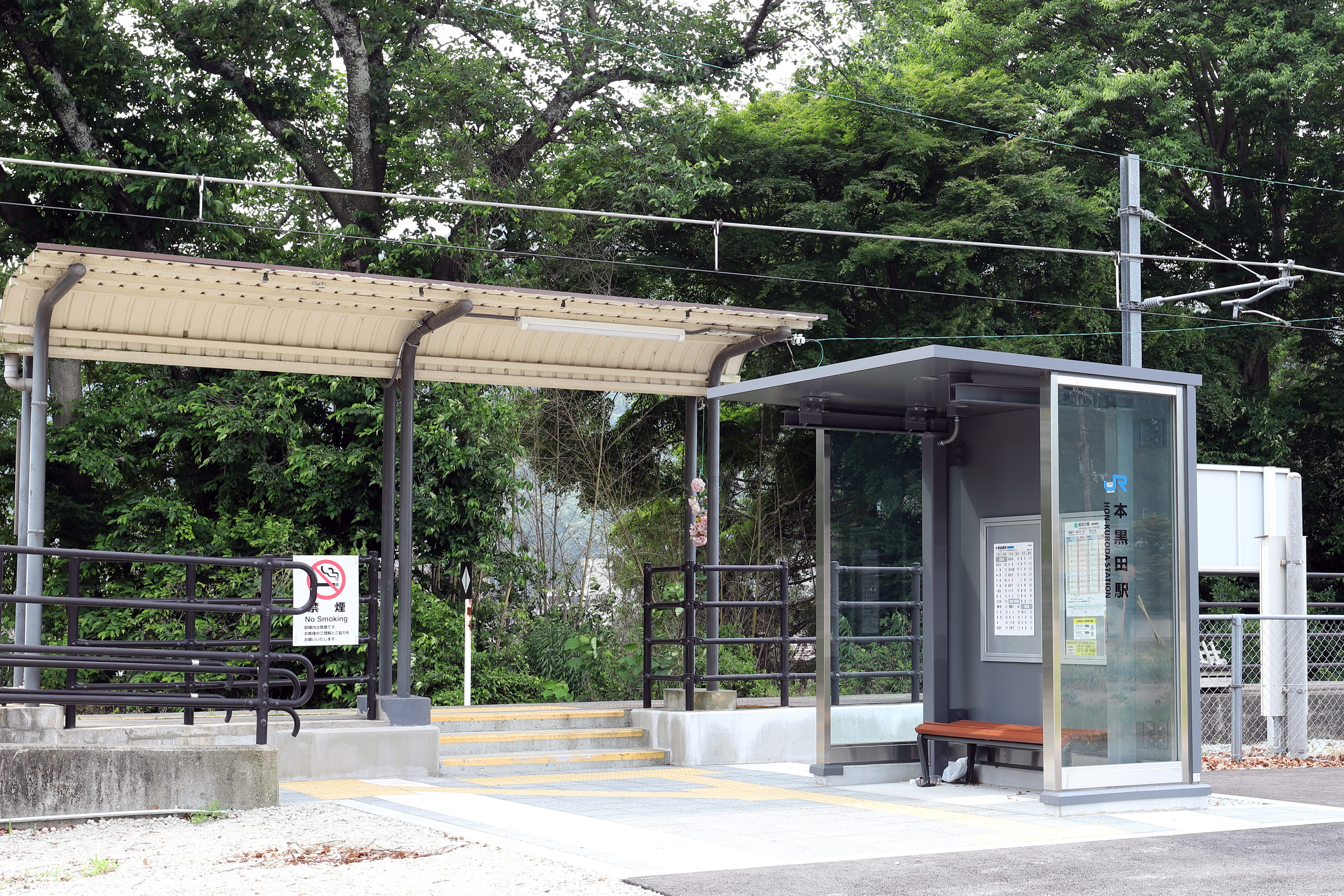
- Hon-Kuroda Station in November 2020

General information
- Location: Nishiwaki, Hyōgo Prefecture; Japan
- Coordinates: 35.0527°N 134.9959°E
- Operator: JR West
- Line: I Kakogawa Line
- Tracks: 1

Construction
- Structure type: Ground level

Other information
- Website: Official website

Services
Preceding station	JR West	Following station
Kurodashō towards Kakogawa	Kakogawa Line Local	Funamachiguchi towards Tanikawa
Location
- Location within Hyōgo Prefecture Location within Japan

Hon-Kuroda Station (本黒田駅, Hon-Kuroda-eki) is a railway station in Nishiwaki, Hyōgo Prefecture, Japan, operated by West Japan Railway Company (JR West).

== Lines ==
Hon-Kuroda Station is served by the Kakogawa Line.

== See also ==
- List of railway stations in Japan
