= Kurodashō, Hyōgo =

Dissolved municipality in Hyōgo prefecture, Japan

Kurodashō (黒田庄町, Kurodashō-chō) was a town located in Taka District, Hyōgo, Japan.

As of 2003, the town had an estimated population of 7,873 and a density of 222.78 persons per km^{2}. The total area was 35.34 km^{2}.

On October 1, 2005, Kurodashō was merged into the expanded city of Nishiwaki.
