= Japan National Route 428 =

Road in Hyogo prefecture, Japan

National Route 428
- 国道428号
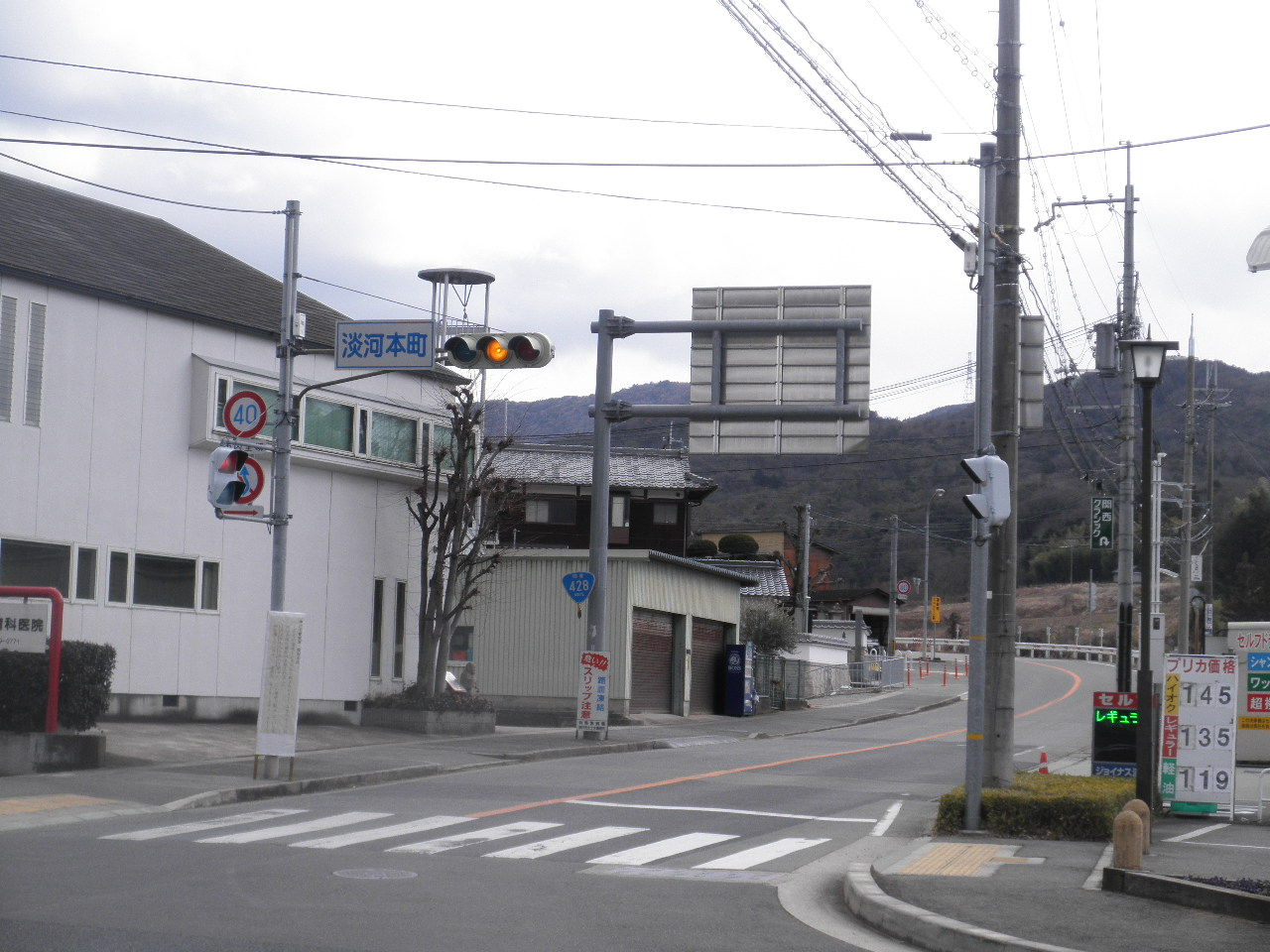

Route information
- Length: 34.4 km (21.4 mi)

Location
- Country: Japan

Highway system
- National highways of Japan; Expressways of Japan
← National Route 427	→ National Route 429

National Route 428 (Note: Japanese: 国道428号 (Kanji: Kokudō 428-gō)) is a national highway of Japan connecting Chūō-ku, Kobe and Miki, Hyōgo in Japan, with a total length of 34.4 km (21.38 mi).
