= Ōkawachi =

Dissolved municipality in Hyōgo prefecture, Japan

Ōkawachi (大河内町, Ōkawachi-chō) was a town located in Hyōgo Prefecture, Japan.

As of 2003, the town had an estimated population of 5,213 and a density of 53.65 persons per km^{2}. The total area was 97.17 km^{2}.

In November 2005, Okawachi was merged with the town of Kanzaki to create the town of Kamikawa.
