= Japan National Route 427 =

Road in Hyogo prefecture, Japan

National Route 427
- 国道427号
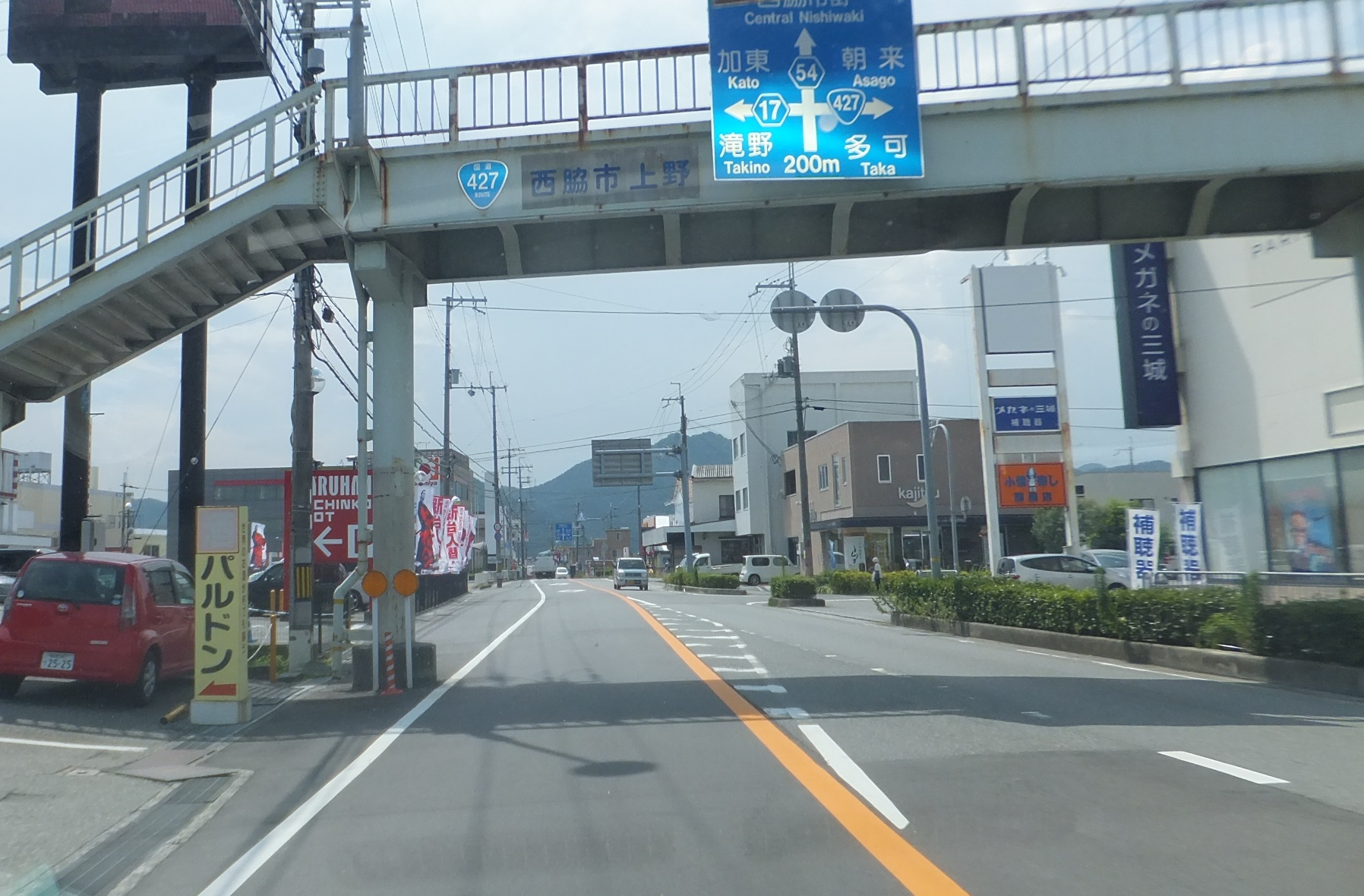

Route information
- Length: 96.9 km (60.2 mi)

Major junctions
- Northern end: Asago, Hyōgo
- Southern end: Nishiwaki, Hyōgo

Location
- Country: Japan

Highway system
- National highways of Japan; Expressways of Japan
| ← National Route 426 | → National Route 428 |

National Route 427 is a national highway of Japan connecting Nishiwaki, Hyōgo and Asago, Hyōgo in Japan, with a total length of 96.9 km (60.21 mi). The southern end of the road connects with Route 175 and the northern end with Route 9.
