= Kamikawa, Hyōgo =

Kamikawa 神河町
- Town
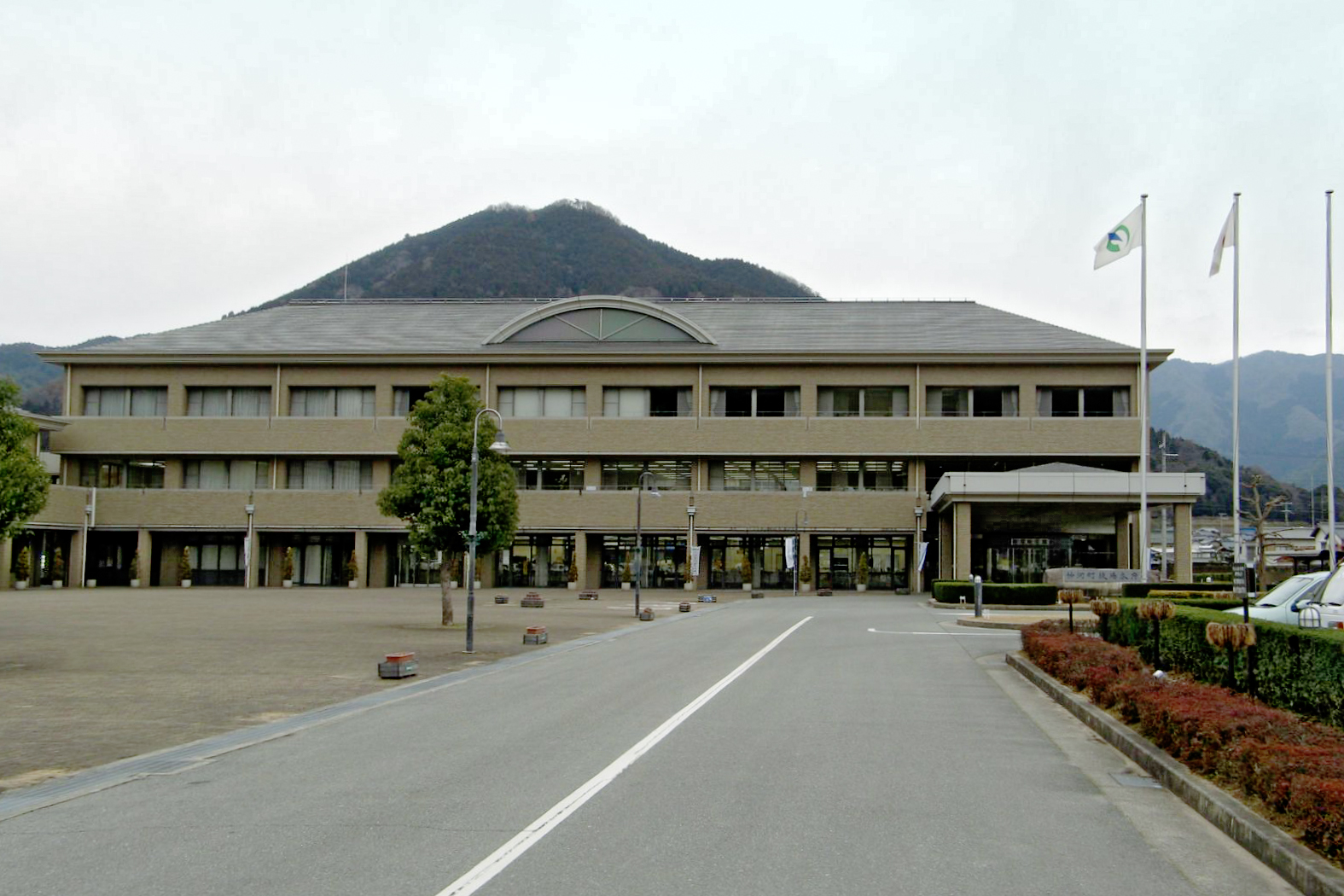
- Kamikawa Town Hall

- Flag Chapter

- Location of Kamikawa in Hyōgo Prefecture

- Location in Japan
- Coordinates: 35°4′N 134°44′E
- Country: Japan
- Region: Kansai
- Prefecture: Hyōgo
- District: Kanzaki

Area
  - Total: 202.23 km^{2} (78.08 sq mi)

Population (April 30, 2022)
  - Total: 10,794
  - Density: 53.375/km^{2} (138.24/sq mi)
- Time zone: UTC+09:00 (JST)
- Area code: 64 Teramae, Kamikawa-cho, Kanzaki-gun, Hyogo-ken 679-3116
- Website: Official website
- Symbols
- Flower: Sakura
- Tree: Maple

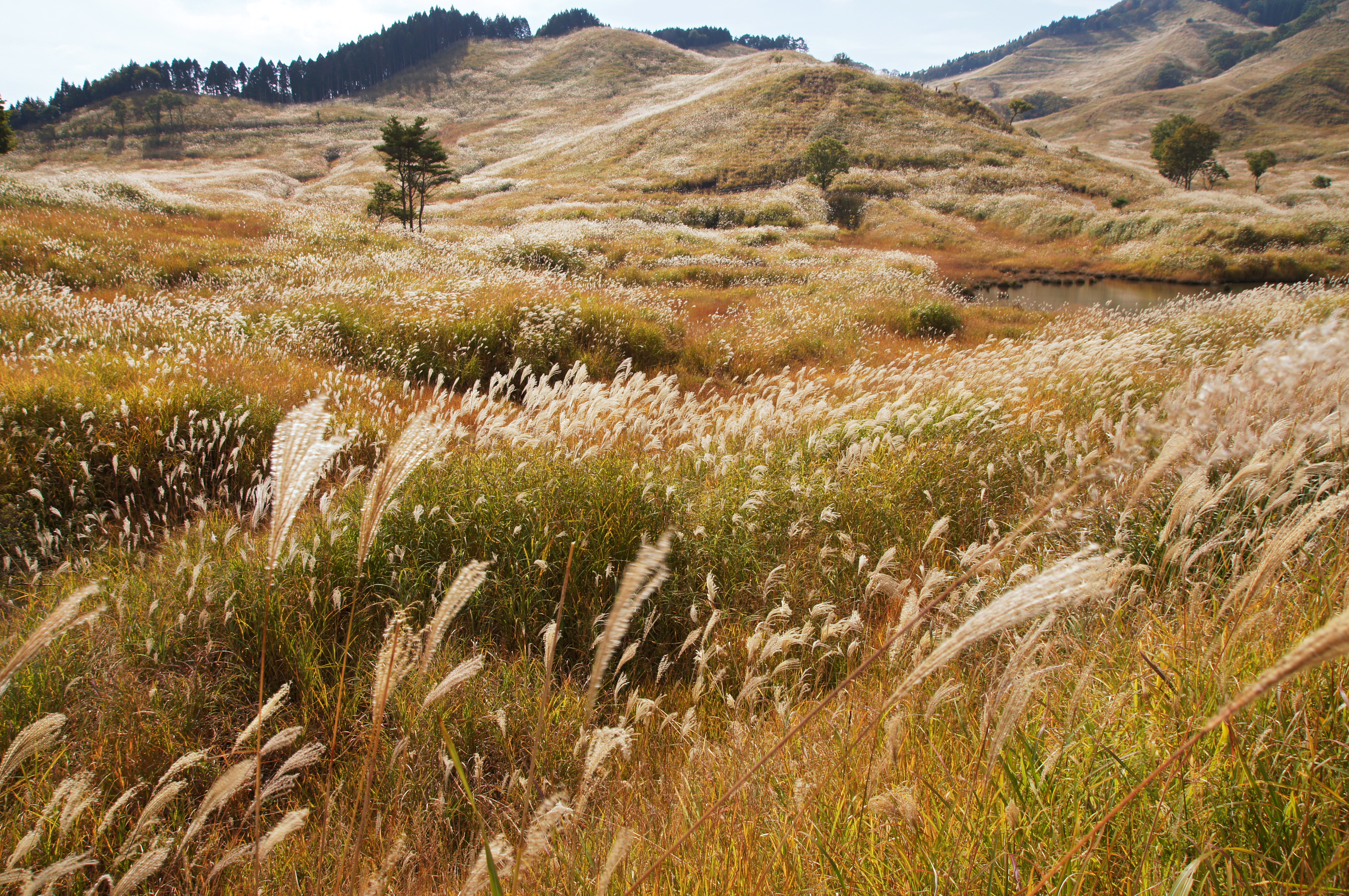
Tonomine highlands

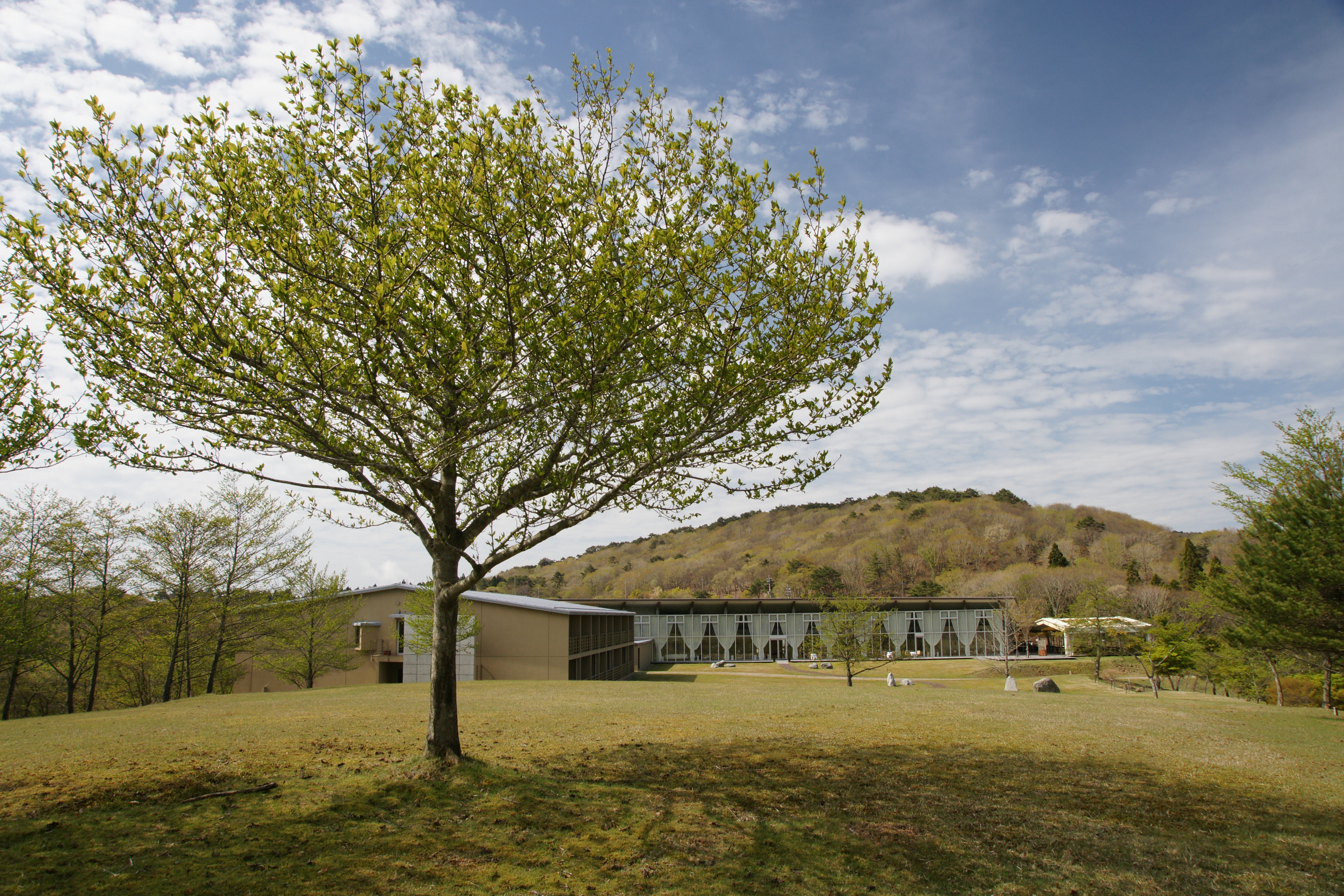
Mineyama highlands

Kamikawa (神河町, Kamikawa-chō) is a town located in Kanzaki District, Hyōgo Prefecture, Japan. As of 30 April 2022, the town had an estimated population of 10,794 in 4220 households and a population density of 53 persons per km^{2}. The total area of the town is 202.23 square kilometres (78.08 sq mi).

== Geography ==
Kamikawa is located in the center of Hyōgo Prefecture. Forests occupy about 80% of the town area, which is surrounded by 1,000-meter-class mountains. Mineyama and Tonomine Kogen are two of the leading plateau areas in the Kansai region. The settlements are scattered in the narrow valley bottom plains along the rivers such as the Odawara River, Ichi River, Ochi River, and Inumi River. The elevation near the Kamikawa Town Hall is 150 meters above sea level.

=== Neighbouring municipalities ===
Hyōgo Prefecture

- Asago
- Himeji
- Ichikawa
- Shisō
- Taka

=== Climate ===
Kamikawa has a Humid subtropical climate (Köppen Cfa) characterized by warm summers and cool winters with light snowfall. The average annual temperature in Kamikawa is 12.6 °C. The average annual rainfall is 1606 mm with September as the wettest month. The temperatures are highest on average in August, at around 24.4 °C, and lowest in January, at around 0.9 °C.

== Demographics ==
Per Japanese census data, the population of Kamikawa has declined steadily over the 70 years.

Historical population
Year	Pop.	±%
1960	15,799	—
1970	14,659	−7.2%
1980	14,401	−1.8%
1990	14,492	+0.6%
2000	13,500	−6.8%
2010	12,229	−9.4%

== History ==
The area of the modern town of Kamikawa was within ancient Harima Province. In the Edo Period, it was divided between Himeji Domain and tenryō territory under direct administration of the Tokugawa shogunate. Following the Meiji restoration, the villages of Teramae and Hase were created within Kanzaki District, Hyōgo. The two villages merged on March 31, 1955, and attained town status as Ōkawachi. On April 1, 1957, Ōkawachi annexed the village of Ikuno from Asago District. Ōkawachi merged with the town of Kanzaki on November 7, 2005, and was renamed Kamikawa.

== Government ==
Kamikawa has a mayor-council form of government with a directly elected mayor and a unicameral town council of 12 members. Kamikawa, together with the other municipalities of Kanzaki District, contributes one member to the Hyogo Prefectural Assembly. In terms of national politics, the town is part of Hyōgo 12th district of the lower house of the Diet of Japan.

== Economy ==
Kamikawa has a mixed economy of agriculture and light manufacturing.

== Education ==
Kamikawa has three public elementary schools and one public middle schools operated by the town government and one public high school operated by the Hyōgo Prefectural Department of Education.

== Transportation ==
=== Railway ===
JR West – Bantan Line

- Niino - Teramae - Hase

=== Highway ===
- Bantan Renraku Road
- National Route 312
