= Kami, Hyōgo (Taka) =

Dissolved municipality in Taka district, Hyōgo prefecture, Japan

Kami (加美町, Kami-chō) was a town located in Taka District, Hyōgo Prefecture, Japan.

As of 2003, the town had an estimated population of 7,296 and a density of 86.80 persons per km^{2}. The total area was 84.06 km^{2}.

On November 1, 2005, Kami, along with the towns of Naka and Yachiyo (all from Taka District), was merged to create the town of Taka.
