= Taka District =

District in Hyōgo prefecture, Japan

Coordinates: 35.069°N 134.902°E

Taka District in Hyōgo Prefecture

Taka (多可郡, Taka-gun) is a district in Hyōgo Prefecture, Japan.

As of 2003, the district has an estimated population of 33,093 and a population density of 150.09/km^{2} (388.7/sq mi). The total area is 220.49 km^{2} (85.13 sq mi).

== Towns ==
- Taka

== Mergers ==
- On 1 October 2005, the town of Kurodashō merged into the city of Nishiwaki.
- On 1 November 2005, the towns of Kami, Naka and Yachiyo merged to form the new town of Taka.

== Places of note ==
- Central Circuit motor racing circuit
