= Naka, Hyōgo =

Town located in Taka District, Japan

Naka 中町
- Town
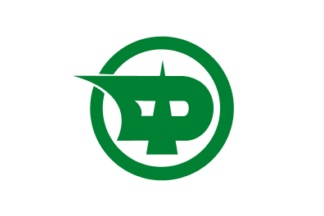
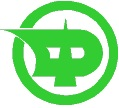
- Flag Seal
- Interactive map of Naka
- Country: Japan
- Region: Kansai
- Prefecture: Hyōgo Prefecture

Area
  - Total: 48.02 km^{2} (18.54 sq mi)

Population (2005)
  - Total: 11,256
  - Density: 234.4/km^{2} (607.1/sq mi)
- Time zone: UTC+09:00 (JST)
- City hall address: 123 Naka-machi, Taka-gun, Hyogo Prefecture; 679-1192
- Symbols
- Flower: Wild chrysanthemum
- Tree: Zelkova

Naka (中町, Naka-chō) was a town located in Taka District, Hyōgo Prefecture, Japan.

As of 2003, the town had an estimated population of 11,662 and a density of 242.86 persons per km^{2}. The total area was 48.02 km^{2}.

On November 1, 2005, Naka, along with the towns of Kami and Yachiyo (all from Taka District), was merged to create the town of Taka.
