= Taka, Hyōgo =

Taka 多可町
- Town
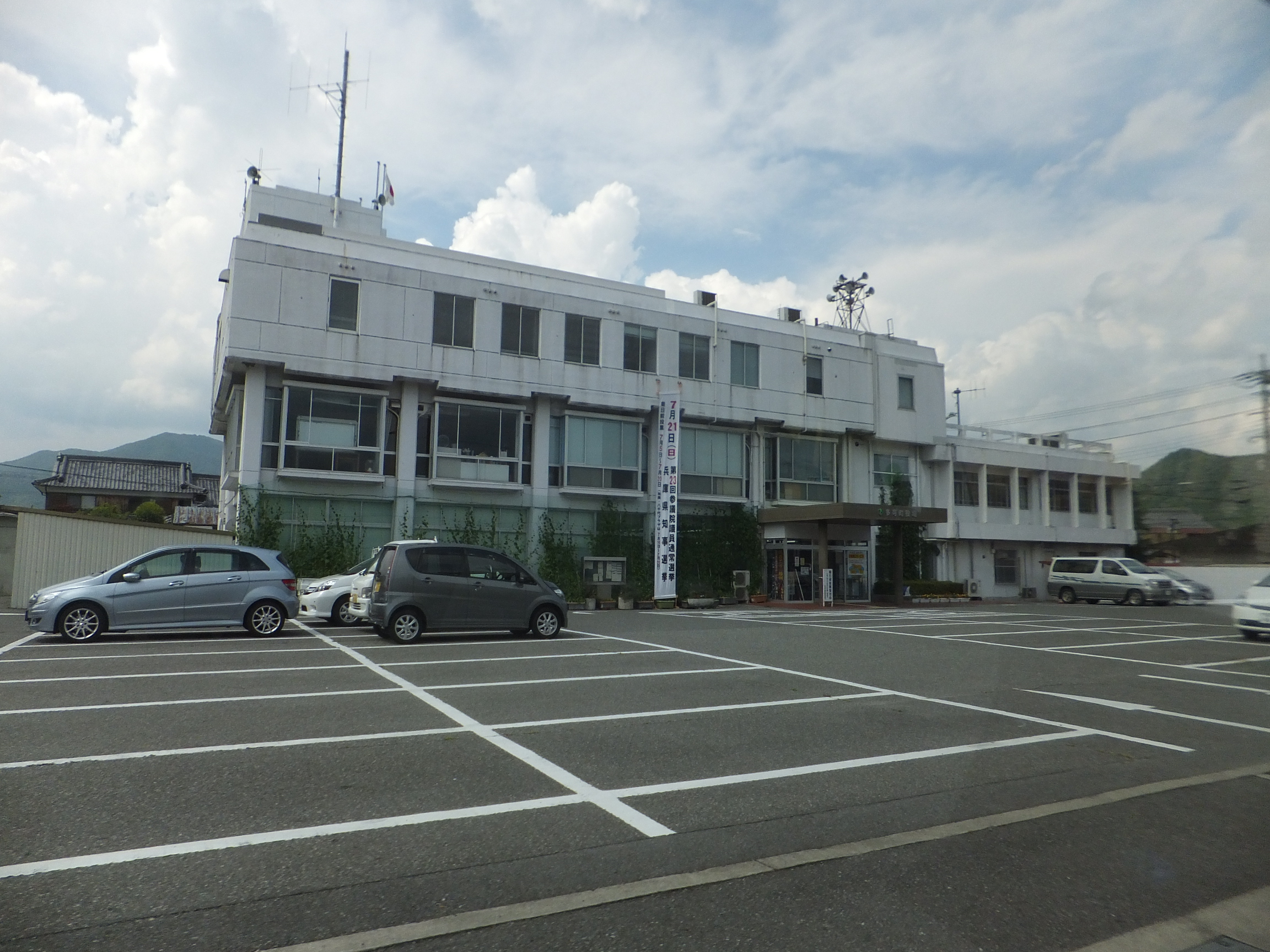
- Taka Town Hall

- Flag Seal

- Location of Taka in Hyōgo Prefecture

- Location in Japan
- Coordinates: 35°03′00″N 134°55′25″E
- Country: Japan
- Region: Kansai
- Prefecture: Hyōgo
- District: Taka

Government
  - Mayor: Kazushi Yoshida

Area
  - Total: 185.19 km^{2} (71.50 sq mi)

Population (May 1, 2022)
  - Total: 19,589
  - Density: 105.78/km^{2} (273.96/sq mi)
- Time zone: UTC+09:00 (JST)
- City hall address: 123 Nakamura-machi, Naka-ku, Taka-chō, Taka-gun, Hyōgo-ken 679-1192
- Website: Official website
- Symbols
- Bird: Green pheasant
- Flower: Wild chrysanthemum Edible chrysanthemum Bamboo lily
- Tree: Japanese zelkova Japanese cedar Hinoki

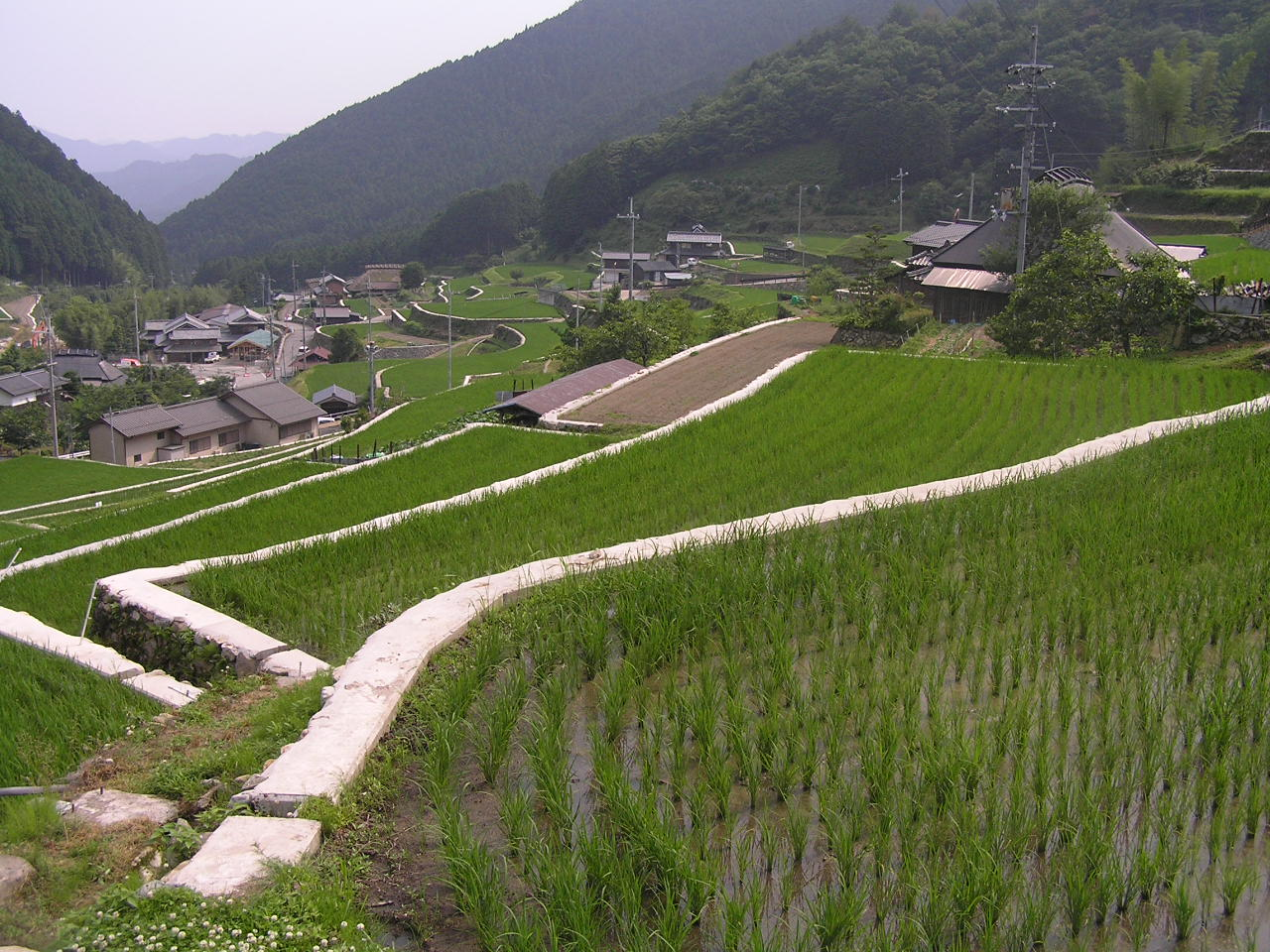
Isarigami Rice Terraces

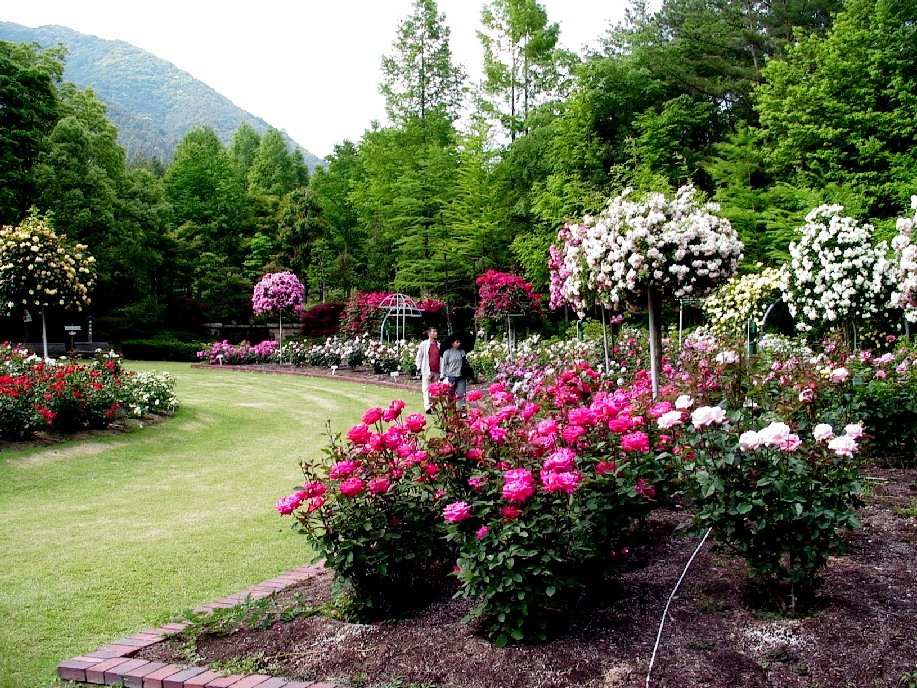
Kitaharima Leisure Village Park Rose Garden

Taka (多可町, Taka-chō) is a town in Taka District, Hyōgo Prefecture, Japan. As of 30 May 2022, the town had an estimated population of 19,589 in 7661 households and a population density of 110 persons per km^{2}. The total area of the town is 185.19 square kilometres (71.50 sq mi).

== Geography ==
Taka is located in central Hyogo Prefecture. Parts of the town are within the borders of the Kasagatayama-Sengamine Prefectural Natural Park.

=== Neighbouring municipalities ===
Hyōgo Prefecture

- Asago
- Ichikawa
- Kamikawa
- Kasai
- Nishiwaki
- Tanba

== Demographics ==
Per Japanese census data, the population of Taka has declined steadily over the 60 years.

Historical population
Year	Pop.	±%
1920	19,976	—
1930	19,466	−2.6%
1940	20,519	+5.4%
1950	26,611	+29.7%
1960	28,662	+7.7%
1970	26,282	−8.3%
1980	26,095	−0.7%
1990	25,745	−1.3%
2000	25,331	−1.6%
2010	23,110	−8.8%

== History ==
The area of the modern town of Taka was within ancient Harima Province. In the Edo Period, most of the area was tenryō territory under direct administration of the Tokugawa shogunate. Following the Meiji restoration, the village of Naka, was created within Taka District, Hyōgo. It was elevated to town status on April 1, 1924. The towns of Kami and Yachiyo were established in 1955 and 1960 respectively through the merger of smaller villages. The three municipalities merged on November 1, 2005, to form the town of Taka.

== Government ==
Taka has a mayor-council form of government with a directly elected mayor and a unicameral town council of 14 members. Taka, together with the city of Nishiwaki, contributes one member to the Hyogo Prefectural Assembly. In terms of national politics, the town is part of Hyōgo 4th district of the lower house of the Diet of Japan.

== Economy ==
The local economy is centered on agriculture. Yamada Nishiki, a brand of rice used for sake production, originated from this area.

== Education ==
Taka has five public elementary schools and three public middle schools operated by the town government and one public high school operated by the Hyōgo Prefectural Department of Education.There is also one private high school. The prefecture also operates one special education school for the handicapped.

== Transportation ==
=== Railway ===
- Until April 1, 1990, the town was serviced by the JR West Kajiya Line. Following the closure of that line, the nearest passenger rail station is Nishiwakishi Station on the JR West Kakogawa Line.

=== Highway ===
- National Route 427
