= Hyōgo Prefectural Museum of History =

- 兵庫県立歴史博物館
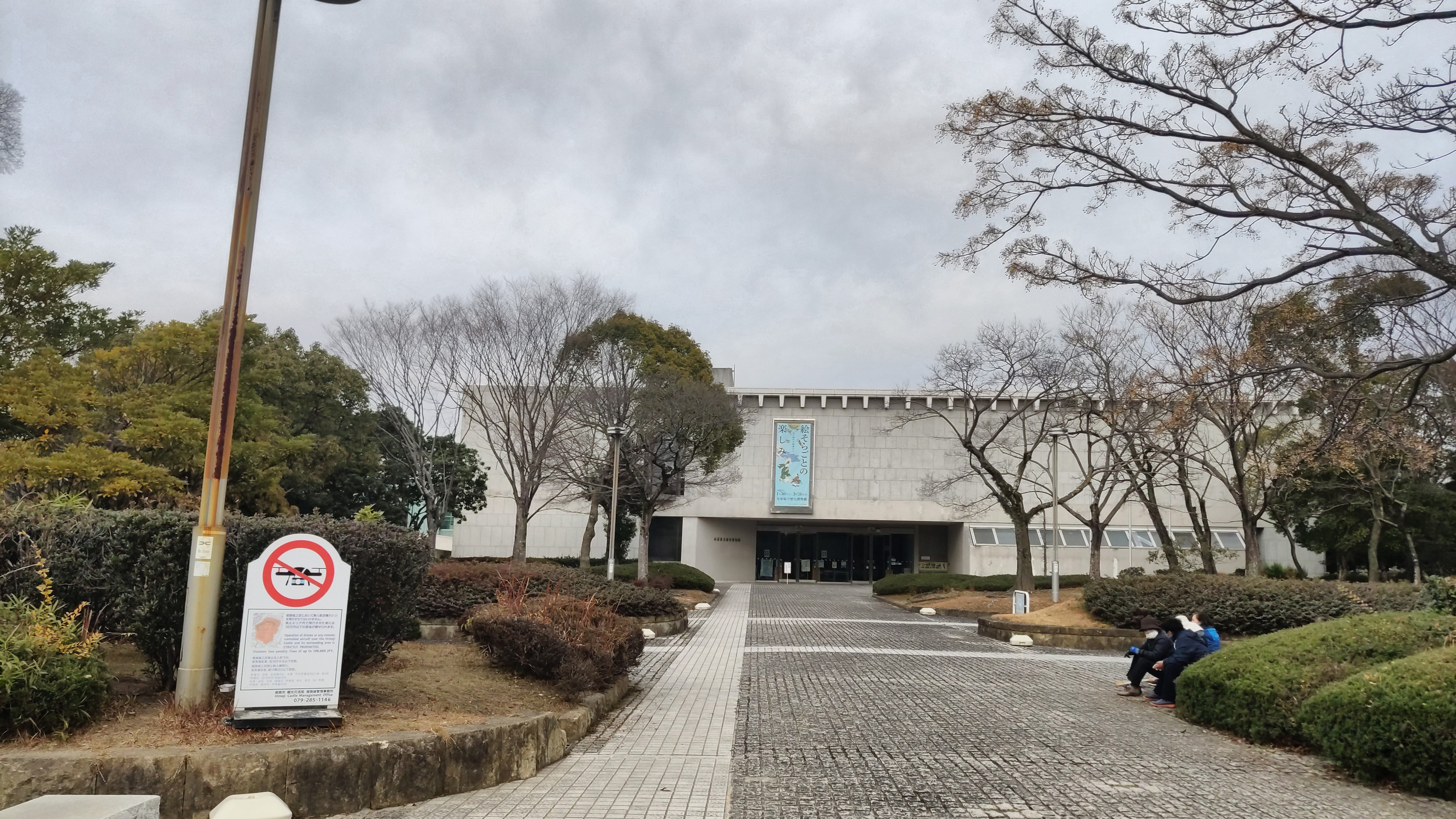
- Interactive map of the Hyōgo Prefectural Museum of History area

General information
- Location: 68 Honmachi, Himeji, Hyōgo Prefecture, Japan
- Coordinates: 34°50′28″N 134°41′49″E
- Opened: April 1983

Website
- Official website

Hyōgo Prefectural Museum of History (兵庫県立歴史博物館, Hyōgo kenritsu rekishi hakubutsukan) opened to the immediate northeast of Himeji Castle in Himeji, Hyōgo Prefecture, Japan in 1983. The collection of over 200,000 items includes one Important Cultural Property — a painting on silk of the parinirvana of the Buddha, dating to the Kamakura period — and five Prefectural Tangible Cultural Properties.

== See also ==
- List of Historic Sites of Japan (Hyōgo)
- Hyōgo Prefectural Museum of Archaeology
- Hyōgo Prefectural Museum of Art
- Museum of Nature and Human Activities, Hyōgo
