= Harima Historical Museum =

- 播磨町郷土資料館
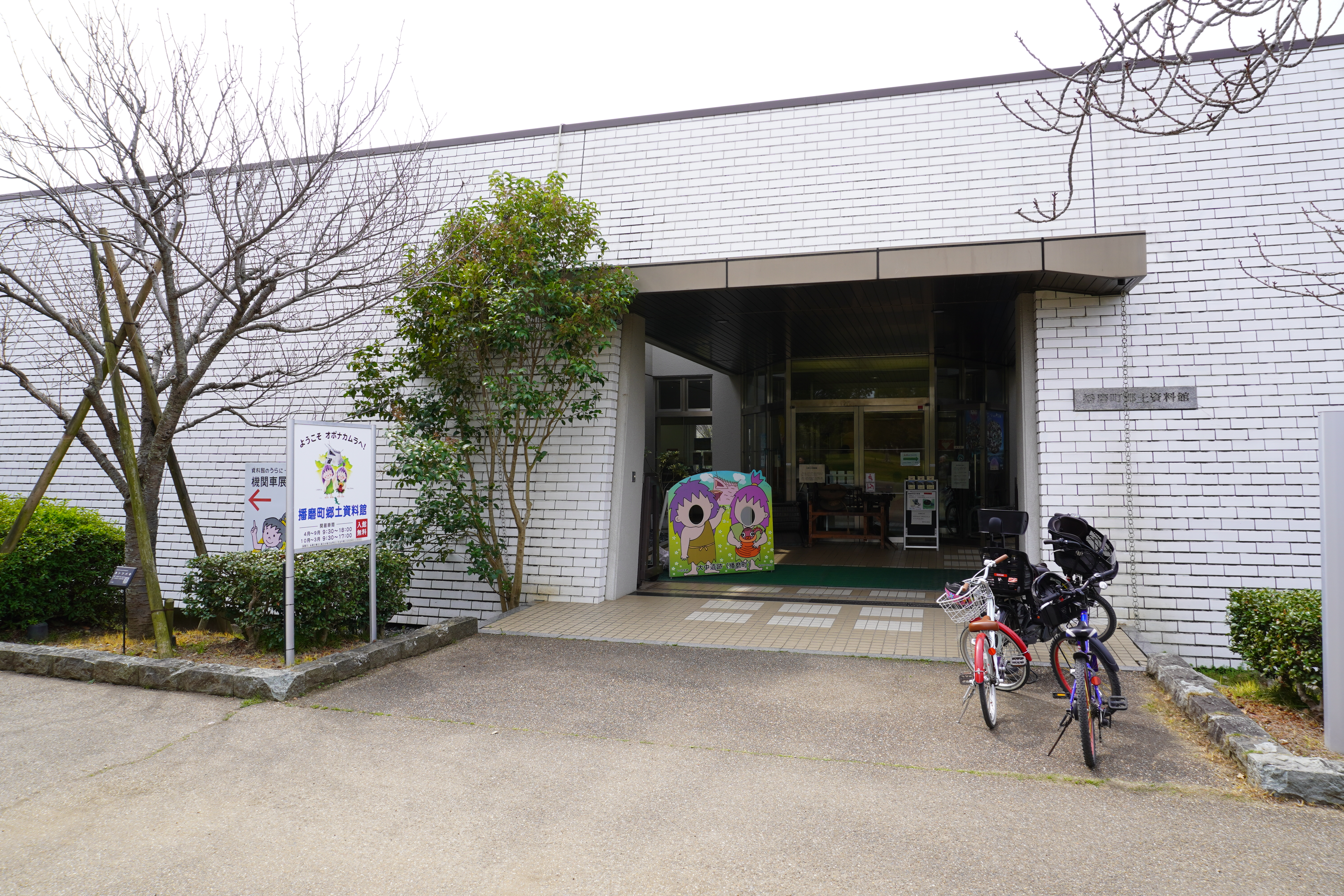
- Interactive map of the Harima Historical Museum area

General information
- Location: 1-1-2 Ōnaka, Harima, Hyōgo Prefecture, Japan
- Coordinates: 34°43′37″N 134°52′34″E
- Opened: 1985

Website
- Official website

Harima Historical Museum (播磨町郷土資料館, Harima-machi kyōdo shiryōkan) opened in Harima, Hyōgo Prefecture, Japan in 1985. The collection includes excavated artefacts from the nearby Ōnaka Site as well as materials relating to the Befu Railway, discontinued in 1984, and to Joseph Heco.

== See also ==
- Hyōgo Prefectural Museum of Archaeology
- List of Historic Sites of Japan (Hyōgo)
