= Tanizaki Jun'ichirō Memorial Museum of Literature, Ashiya =

- 芦屋市谷崎潤一郎記念館
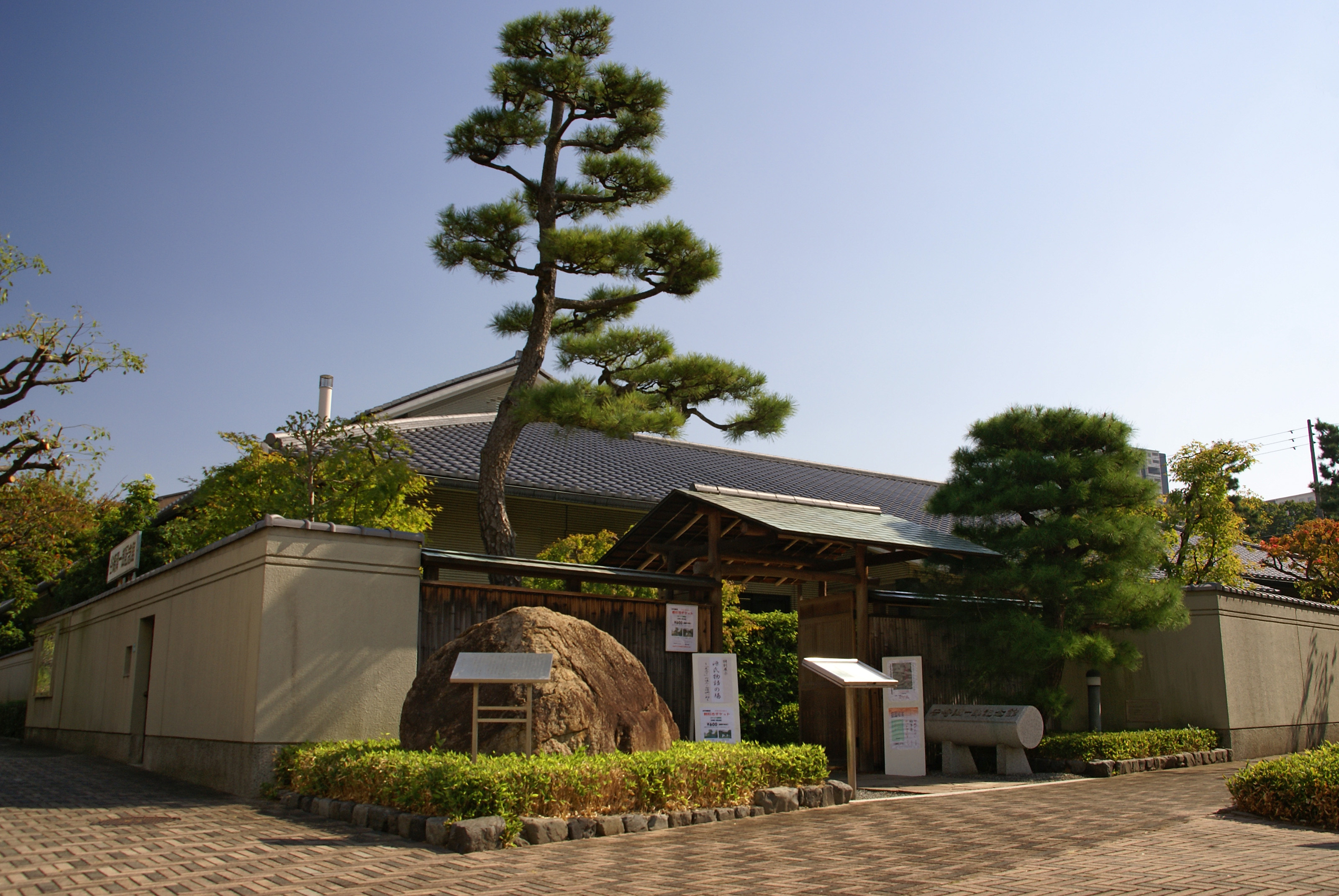
- Interactive map of the Tanizaki Jun'ichirō Memorial Museum of Literature, Ashiya area

General information
- Location: 12–15 Ise-chō, Ashiya, Hyōgo Prefecture, Japan
- Coordinates: 34°43′20″N 135°18′40″E
- Opened: 8 October 1988

Website
- Official website (ja)

Tanizaki Jun'ichirō Memorial Museum of Literature, Ashiya (芦屋市谷崎潤一郎記念館, Ashiya-shi Tanizaki Junichirō Kinenkan) opened in Ashiya, Hyōgo Prefecture, Japan in 1988. The museum commemorates the life and works of Tanizaki Jun'ichirō.

== See also ==
- Museum of Nature and Human Activities, Hyōgo
- Tanizaki Prize
- Egenoyama Site
