= Hisagozuka Kofun (Himeji) =

Kofun period burial mound in Himeji, Japan

- 瓢塚古墳 (Japanese)
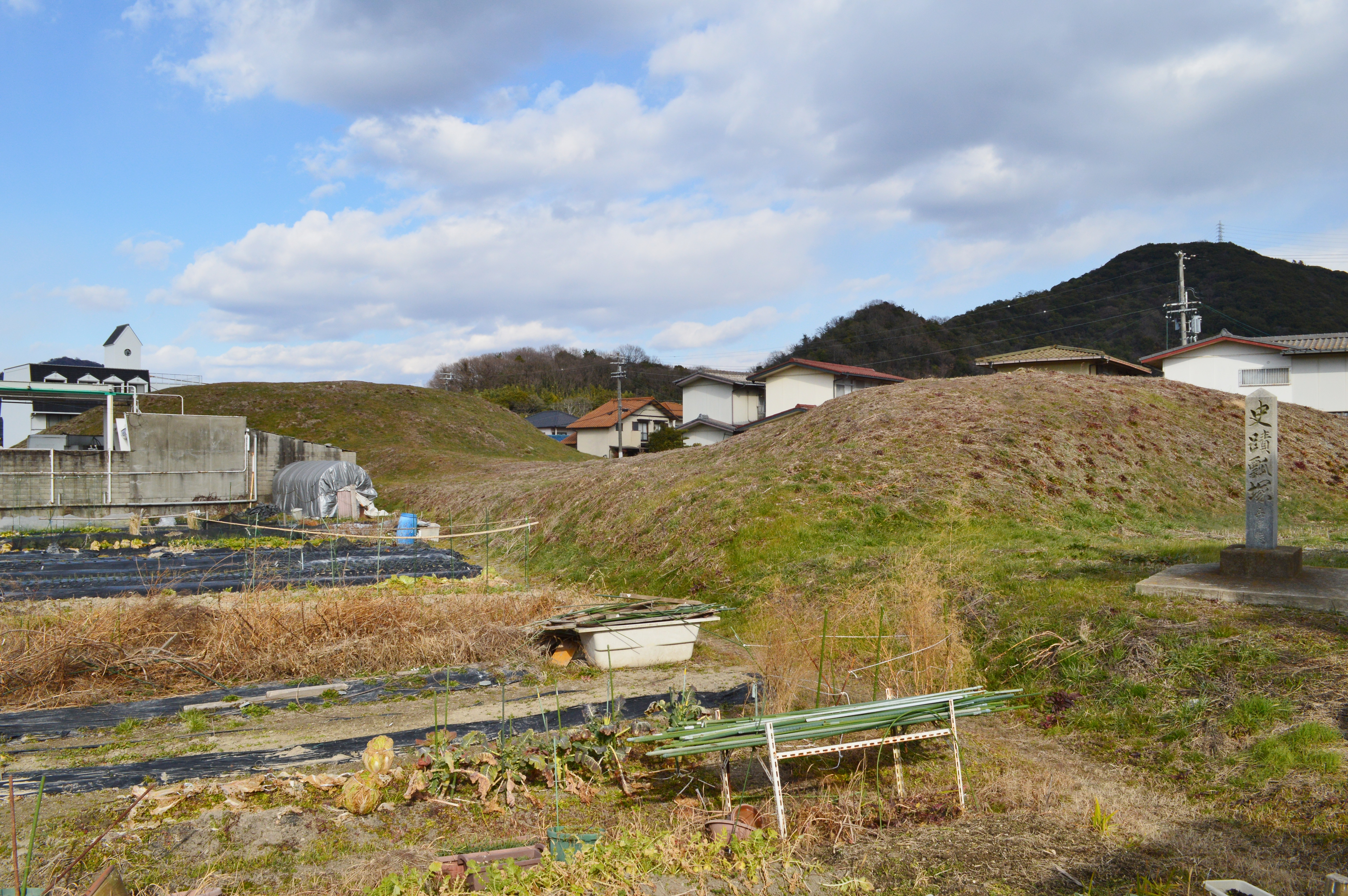
- Hisagozuka Kofun, posterior circular portion to the left

- Hisagozuka Kofun Hisagozuka Kofun (Himeji) (Japan)
- Interactive map of Hisagozuka Kofun
- 34°49′4.04″N 134°35′59.76″E
- Type: Kofun
- Periods: Kofun period
- Location: Himeji, Hyōgo, Japan
- Region: Kansai region

History
- Built: early 4th century AD

Site notes
- Public access: Yes

The Hisagozuka Kofun (瓢塚古墳), also known as the Yoro-Hisagozuka Kofun (丁瓢塚古墳), is a kofun burial mound located in the Katsuhara neighborhood of the city of Himeji, Hyōgo Prefecture, in the Kansai region of Japan. The tumulus was designated a National Historic Site in 1978.

== Overview ==
The Hisagozuka Kofun is located on the eastern edge of the Ibo River Plain at an elevation of five meters. The tumulus is built on a flat land, but there is a hill on the east side, and it is highly possible that it was built by taking in a portion of the hill extension. It is presumed that the ruins of the nearby village were crushed during the construction because the embankment of the mound was found to contain a mixture of earthenware pieces. The tumulus is a zenpō-kōen-fun (前方後円墳), which is shaped like a keyhole, having one square end and one circular end, when viewed from above. It is orientated to the south and has an overall length of around 100 meters, making it one of the largest in the Nishi-Harima region. The posterior circular portion of the mound is constructed in three tiers, but the anterior rectangular portion is not well-preserved, and its construction is uncertain. The scale of the mound is not clear because the mound has not been confirmed by archaeological excavation, and lengths of anywhere from 98.8 to 109 meters appear in published literature. There are reports that haniwa have been found on the mound, but this is also uncertain and the location of any such artifacts is unknown. Likewise, it is presumed that large fukiishi were used on the mound, but these stones have also disappeared. No trace of a moat has been discovered. A pit-type stone burial chamber was exposed at the southern edge of the rear circle, but from its location, it is presumed that a main burial chamber exists in the central part of the rear circle. No grave goods have been discovered.

The tumulus is presumed to have been built in the early Kofun period based on its shape. The scale of the mound is more than double that of the early burial mounds in the area, and is similar to the tombs of the kings of the Yamato Kingdom at that time.

The tumulus is about a 20-minute walk from Aboshi Station on the JR West San'yo Main Line.

Overall length
109 meters
Posterior circular portion
58 meter diameter x 3-tier
Anterior rectangular portion
40 meters wide

== Gallery ==
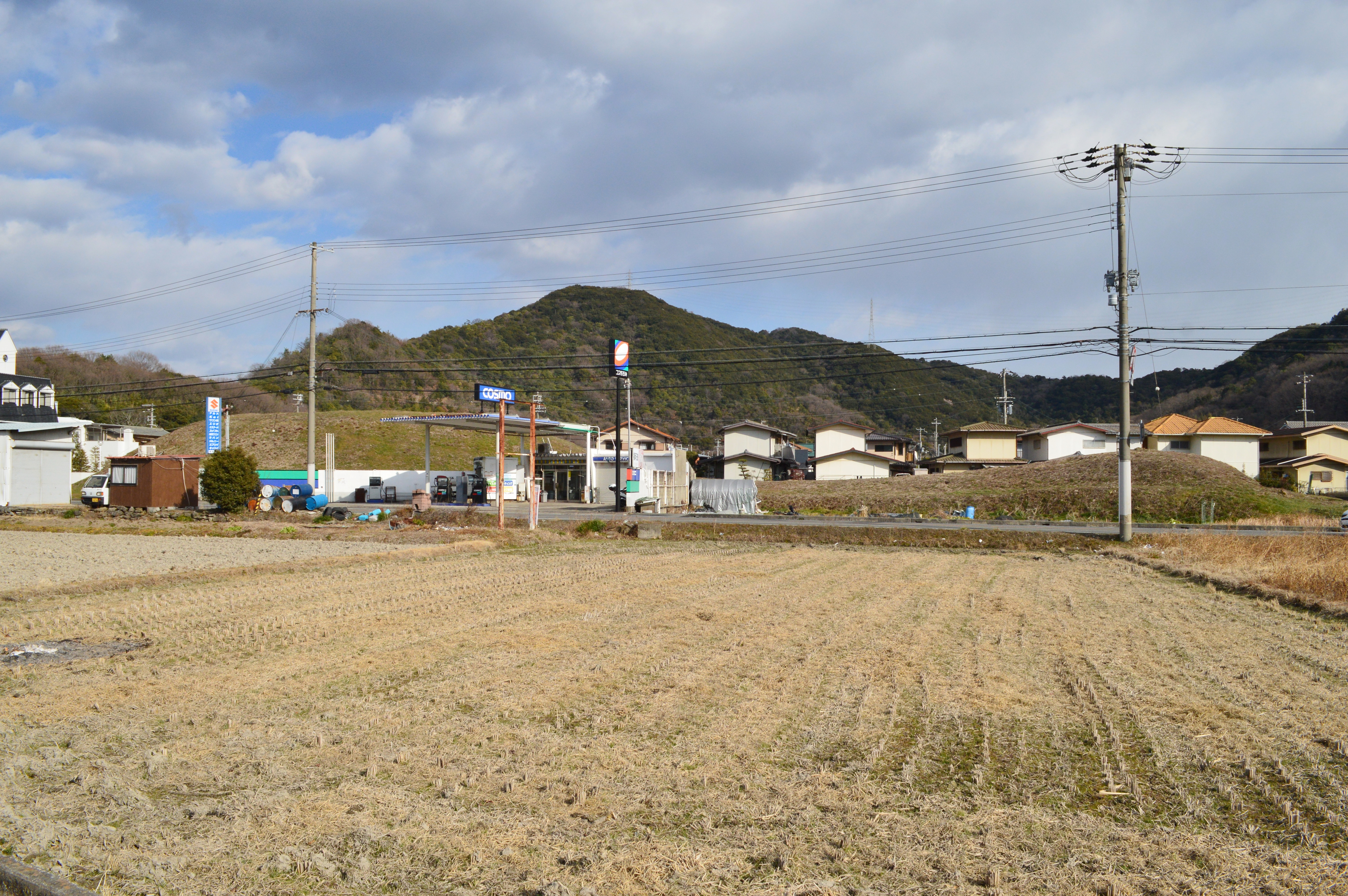
panoramic view with posterior circular portion to the left

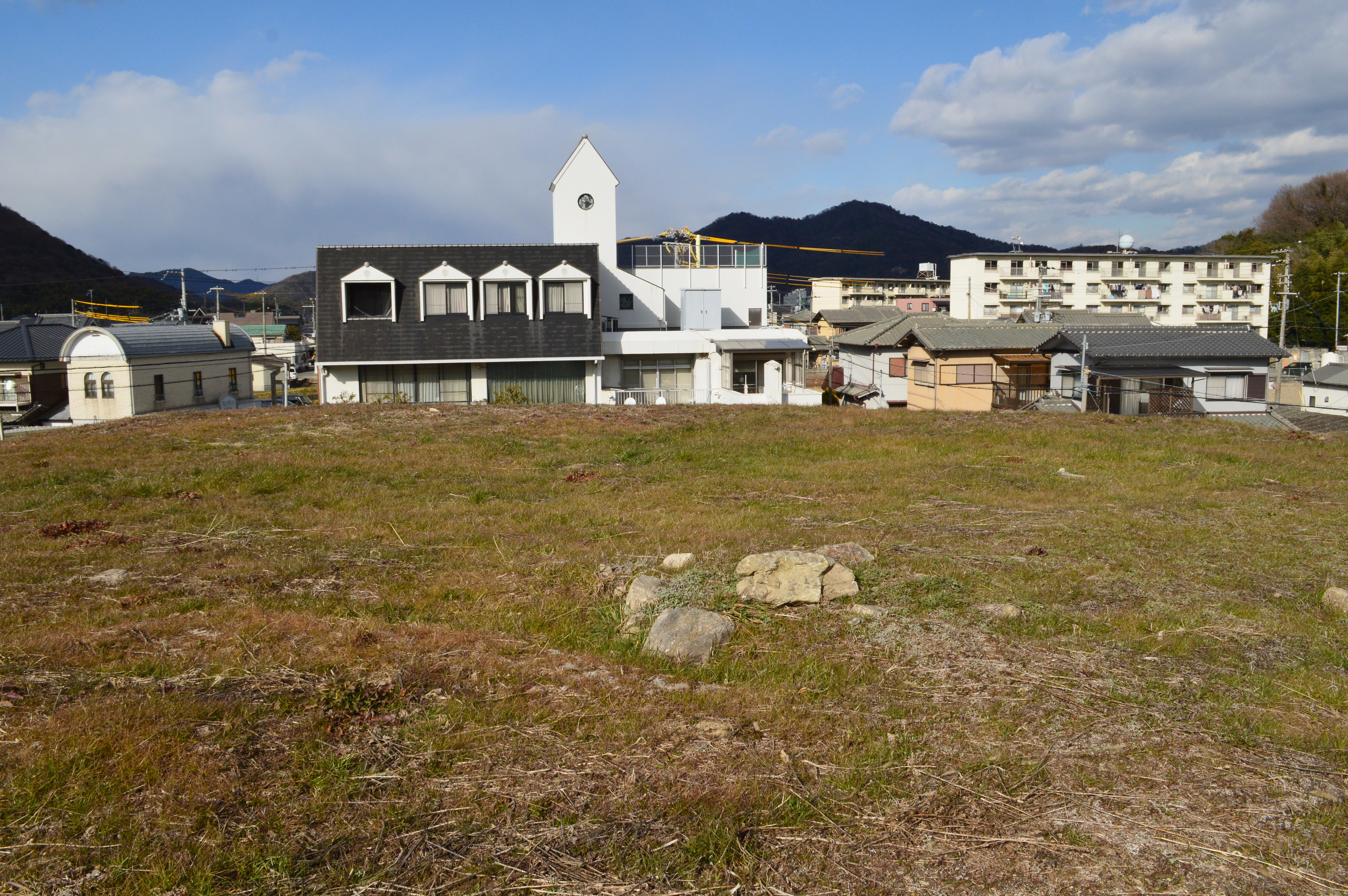
posterior circular portion

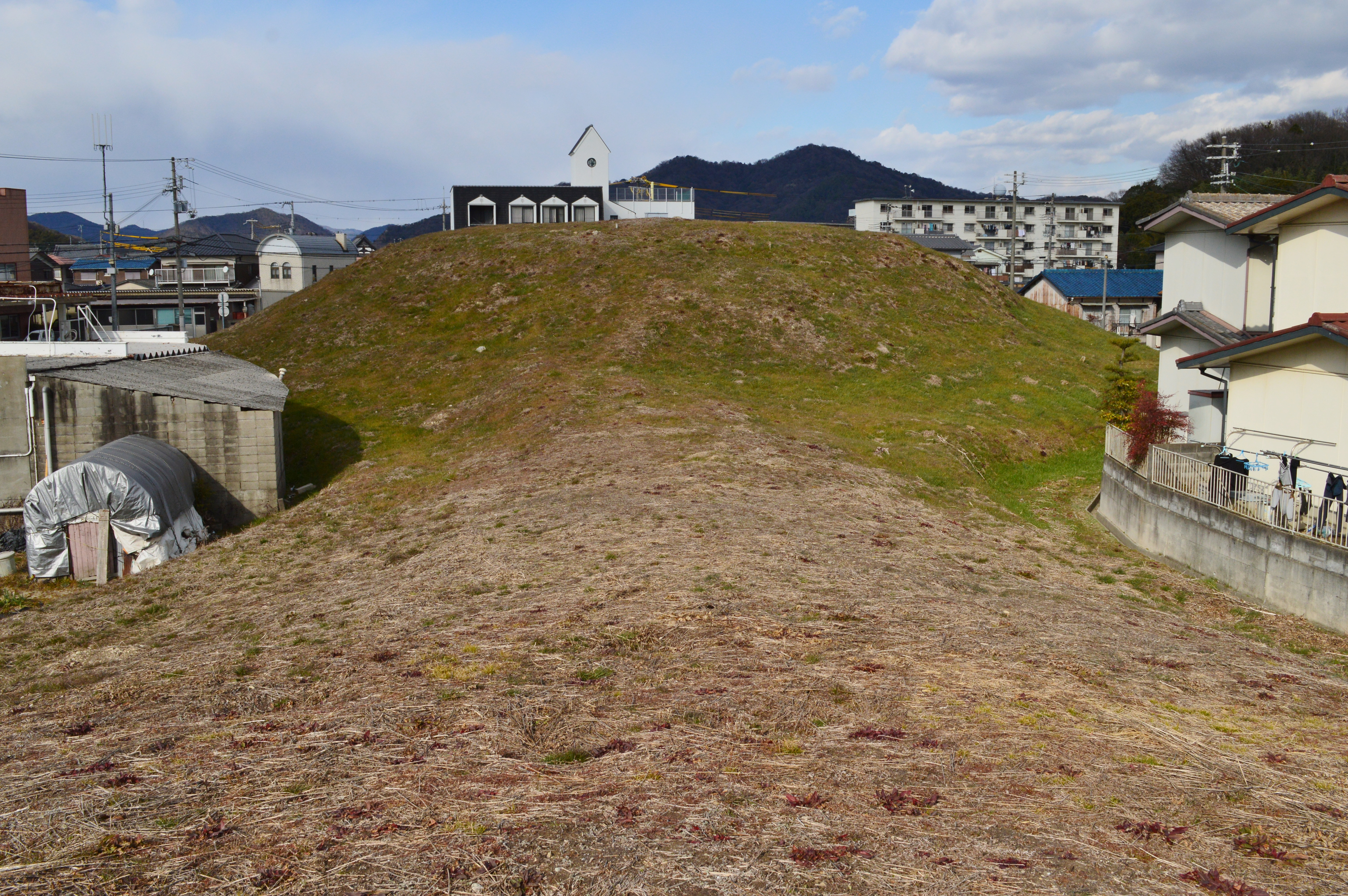
anterior to poster

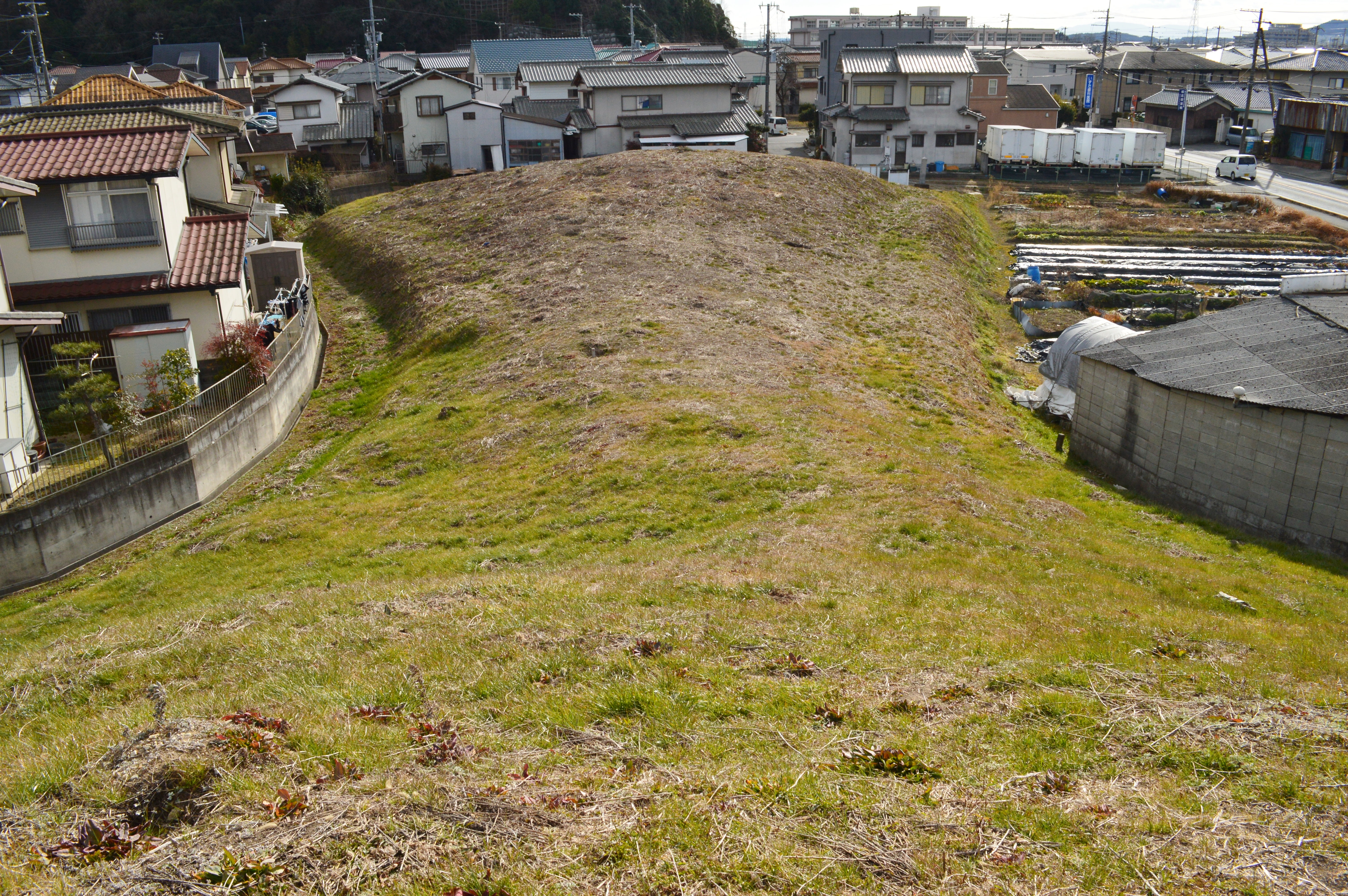
posteior to anterior

== See also ==
- List of Historic Sites of Japan (Hyōgo)
