= Itami temple ruins =

Hakuhō period Buddhist temple ruins

- 伊丹廃寺跡 (Japanese)
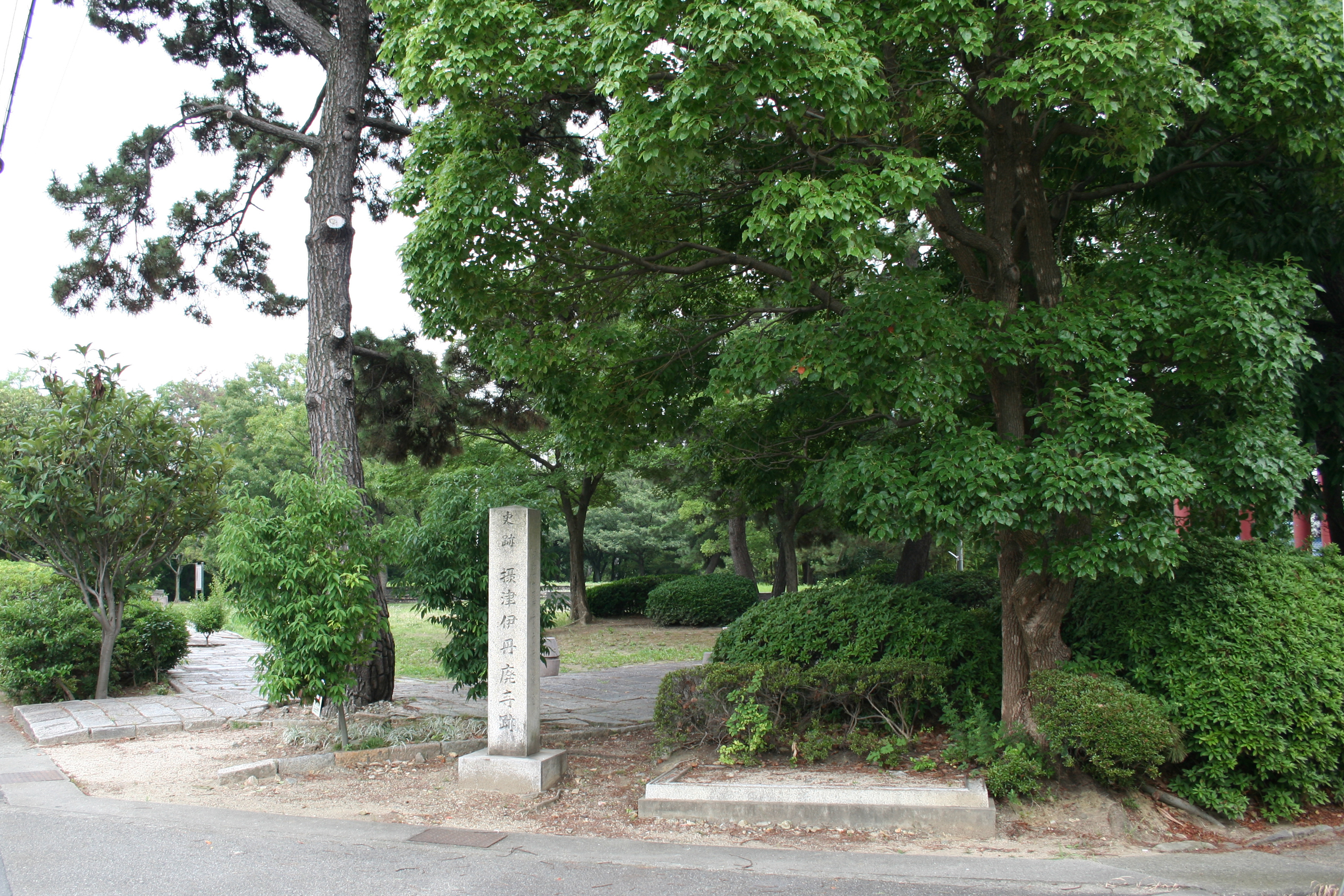
- Itami temple ruins

- Itami temple ruins Itami temple ruins (Japan)
- Interactive map of Itami temple ruins
- 34°47′50.9″N 135°24′24.3″E
- Type: temple ruins
- Periods: Hakuhō period
- Location: Itami, Hyōgo, Japan
- Region: Kansai region

Site notes
- Public access: Yes

The Itami temple ruins (伊丹廃寺跡, Itami Haiji ato), is an archaeological site with the ruins of a Hakuhō period Buddhist temple located in the Midorigaoka neighborhood of the city of Itami, Hyōgo, Japan. The name of the temple is unknown, and no structures remain, but the temple grounds were designated as a National Historic Site in 1966.

== Overview ==
The Itami temple ruins are located to the west of Osaka International Airport on the Itai Terrace. The existence of a ruined temple at this location has been known since the Edo period, as roof tiles and foundation stones have been found in the area. A number of foundation stones believed to have been originally from the temple site have been found in gardens around Itami as ornamental stones. Per an archaeological excavation carried out in 1958, the foundations of a Hōryū-ji style temple, with the main hall on the east and the pagoda on the west side orientated to the south, and surrounded by corridors. The ruins of the main hall are 20 meters east–west and 16 meters north–south. There are two stairs on the left and right sides of the south face, and one in the center of the north face, and a main hall with two stairs on the left and right is rare. The ruins of the tower are 12.7 meters on each side and are piled up only with roof tiles. Outside the corridor, a building that looks like an auditorium straddles the grounds of the Japan Ground Self-Defense Force Itami Garrison to the north, and a group of buildings, possibly monk's quarters from the same period, as have been confirmed to the east. The layout of the auditorium is partly different from that of the Hōryū-ji style in that it is located on the east side of the central axis. The temple appears to have been abandoned from around the late Kamakura period. Currently, the foundations of the main hall and five-storied pagoda have been restored and are open to the public as a historic park.

== See also ==
- List of Historic Sites of Japan (Hyōgo)
