= Hyōgo Prefectural Museum of Archaeology =

- 兵庫県立考古博物館
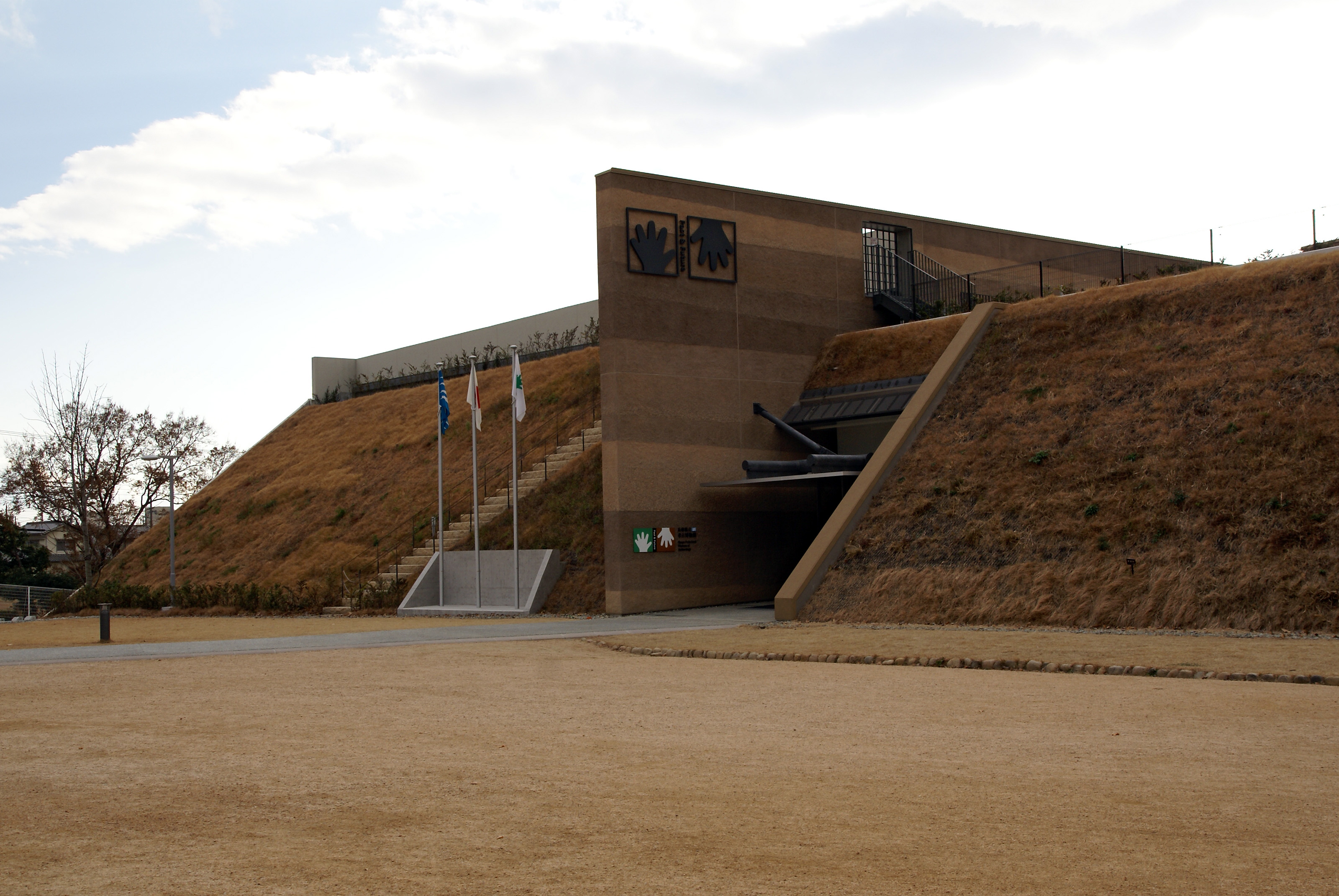
- Interactive map of the Hyōgo Prefectural Museum of Archaeology area

General information
- Location: 1-1-1 Ōnaka, Harima, Hyōgo Prefecture, Japan
- Coordinates: 34°43′32″N 134°52′39″E
- Opened: October 2007

Website
- Official website

Hyōgo Prefectural Museum of Archaeology (兵庫県立考古博物館, Hyōgo kenritsu kōko hakubutsukan) opened next to the Ōnaka Site in Harima, Hyōgo Prefecture, Japan in 2007. The museum exhibits archaeological finds from all over the prefecture. The collection includes two Important Cultural Properties — assemblages of artefacts excavated from Ikeda Kofun in Asago and Miidani No.2 Tumulus in Yabu — and a number of Prefectural Tangible Cultural Properties.

== See also ==
- List of Historic Sites of Japan (Hyōgo)
