= Mitsuzuka temple ruins =

- 三ツ塚廃寺跡 (Japanese)
- Mitsuzuka temple ruins Mitsuzuka temple ruins (Japan)
- Interactive map of Mitsuzuka temple ruins
- 35°12′38″N 135°08′32″E
- Type: temple ruins
- Periods: Hakuhō period
- Location: Tamba, Hyōgo, Japan
- Region: Kansai region

History
- Built: 6th century AD

Site notes
- Public access: Yes (park, museum)

Mitsuzuka temple ruins (三ツ塚廃寺跡, Mitsuzuka haiji ato) is an archaeological site with the ruins of a Hakuhō period Buddhist temple located in the Ichijima neighborhood of the city of Tanba, Hyōgo, Japan. It was designated as a National Historic Site in 1976.

== History ==
The Mitsuzuka ruins are located on a fluvial terrace of the Takeda River. Although the complete layout of the temple, such as the Lecture Hall and cloisters has not yet been detected, the layout which has been uncovered is extremely unusual. The foundation platforms for three buildings in a row from east-to-west have been found. The central building was the Kondō, and it is flanked to either side by east and west Pagodas. The Middle Gate, East Gate, and West Gate and the North Gate with small portion of a palisade have been found. The Kondō measured approximately 12.8 by 10.3 meters, and the pagoda were ten-meters on each side with a central core pillar of 1.2 meters in diameter. These buildings were surrounded by grounds of excavated pillar buildings and what appears to have been dozens of smaller pagoda on the north side. A tile kiln which supplied roof tiles for the buildings was located in the southeastern part of the temple complex. The temple vanished sometime in the Heian period, and as it does not appear in any historical records, the name of the temple is unknown. The site is currently maintained as the Mitsuzuka Historical Park, an archaeological park. It is located about 25 minutes on foot from Ichijima Station on the JR West Fukuchiyama Line. The Ichijima Folklore Museum displays materials excavated from the ruins of the abandoned temple and kiln.

== See also ==
- List of Historic Sites of Japan (Hyōgo)
