= Tano Site =

Yayoi period settlement trace in Hyōgo Prefecture, Japan

Tano site
- 田能遺跡 (Japanese)
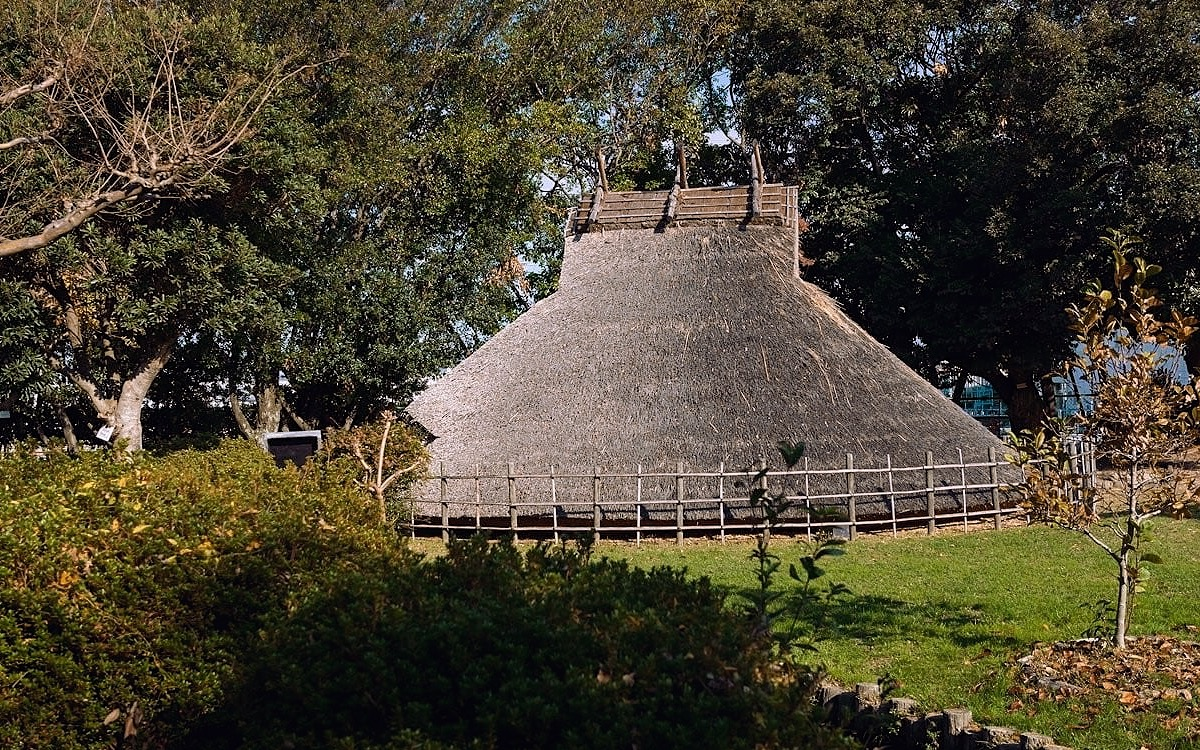
- Tano site reconstructed pit dwelling

- Tano site Tano Site (Japan)
- Interactive map of Tano site
- 34°46′11.5″N 135°26′25.8″E
- Type: Settlement trace
- Periods: Yayoi period
- Location: Amagasaki and Itami, Hyōgo, Japan
- Region: Kansai region

Site notes
- Public access: Yes (park and museum)

The Tano Site (田能遺跡, Tano iseki) is an archaeological site with the traces of a Yayoi period settlement straddling the border between the cities of Amagasaki and Itami, Hyōgo Prefecture, in the Kansai region of Japan. It was designated a National Historic Site in 1969.

== Overview ==
The Tano Site was discovered in 1965, when a large amount of Yayoi pottery was discovered during the construction of the Sonoda Water Distribution Station for industrial water by the three cities of Amagasaki, Itami, and Nishnomiya and the resultant archaeological excavation found wooden and jar coffin tombs in addition to the remains of pit dwellings. Of particular interest was the discovery of wooden coffins. Since wood is easily rotten, the custom of wooden coffin burial in the Yayoi period, which had been speculated until then, was confirmed for the first time. Human bones were also found in one of the wooden coffins during the first excavation.

The ruins are located near the old Ina River channel at an altitude of about 7 meters on the Nishisetsu Plain, and cover an area of 115 meters from east to west and more than 120 meters from north to south. In addition to the traces of four circular pit dwellings from the middle Yayoi period, and were countless small pits with pillar holes, it is presumed that the period pillar buildings coexisted with pit dwellings. Recovered artifacts include pottery, stone tools such as stone axes, bronze products, iron products, and the mould for casting a bronze sword. Initially, after the survey, it was planned to proceed with the construction of the water distribution station as planned and destroy the ruins, but as a result of the growing movement to preserve the ruins, it was decided to preserve the site. Since then, the ruins have been reconstructed three-dimensionally, including raised-floor warehouses, dwellings, and burial mounds, and the recovered artifacts are displayed at the Amagasaki City Tano Museum (尼崎市立田能資料館, Amagasaki shiritsu tanōshiryōkan) which opened in 1970 on site.

== See also ==
- List of Historic Sites of Japan (Hyōgo)
