= Wadamisaki Battery =

Coastal defense in Hyōgo-ku, Kobe, Japan

- 和田岬砲台
- Hyōgo-ku, Kobe, Japan in Japan

Site information
- Type: Coastal defense battery
- Owner: Mitsubishi Heavy Industries
- Open to the public: Yes, with prior booking

Location
- Coordinates: 34.6523°N 135.1849°E

Site history
- Built: 1864
- Built by: Jirō Kanō
- Architect: Masayasu Satō [ja]
- Materials: Granite, Keyaki wood
- Fate: Historic site

Garrison information
- Designations: Historic site (Japan)

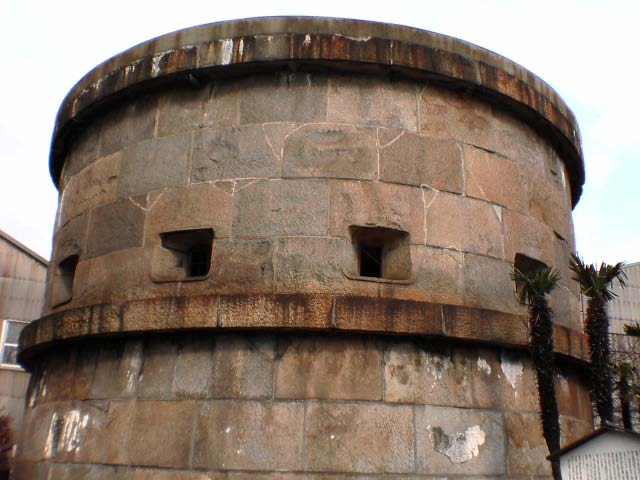
Wadamisaki Battery

The Wadamisaki Battery (和田岬砲台, Wadamisaki Hōdai) is a coastal defense located in Hyōgo-ku, Kobe, Japan. It was built in 1864 by the Tokugawa shogunate in the Bakumatsu period, shortly before the end of the Shōgun's reign. One of many batteries built by the shogunate towards the end of its reign, the Wadamisaki Battery is the only one remaining from several that were built around Osaka Bay and is today listed in the Japanese government's register of historic sites.

== History ==
After coming to power in the early 17th century, the Tokugawa shogunate had kept Japan in a state of isolation (sakoku) for a period of more than 250 years. This isolation was brought to an end in the 1850s by the arrival of American and British forces who demanded the opening of Japan's ports to trade. After initial resistance the Treaty of Amity and Commerce was signed between the United States in July 1858 and Hyogo Port was opened to American trade on 1 January 1860.

Fearing Japan could be colonised by Western forces, the defence of Hyogo Port was upgraded with the construction of the Wadamisaki Battery. It was one of several batteries constructed around Osaka Bay under the orders of Count Katsu Kaishū, who was also responsible for establishing the Kobe Naval Training Center near the Wadamisaki Battery. The battery was designed by Masayasu Satō (佐藤政養) and the contractor was Jirō Kanō (嘉納次郎). It was completed in 1864 after approximately 15 to 18 months of construction and at a cost of approximately 25,000 ryō.

With the full opening of Hyogo Port (modern day Kobe Port) on 1 January 1868, the batteries that lined the coast of Osaka Bay were no longer required despite never being put to use. Of the other batteries built in Hyogo Prefecture during the 1860s, only the outer granite wall of the Nishinomiya Battery remains after its wooden internal structure was destroyed by fire in 1884. All of the other batteries were sold off to private individuals and demolished during the Meiji period.

In 1872 the Hyogo prefecture government decided to sell the Wadamisaki Battery site also, however the governor of the prefecture overruled the decision and it remained public property. The site was eventually sold to Hyōgo Sōko in 1896, who in turn sold it the following year to the Mitsubishi Joint-Stock Company (三菱合資, Mitsubishi Gōshi Kaisha), which at the time was the parent company of the Mitsubishi group of companies. On 3 March 1921 the battery was registered as a historic site by the national government, the first in Hyogo Prefecture.

It underwent its first major repairs from October 1926 to January 1927, during which steel supports were added to support the roof. The battery survived the 1995 Great Hanshin earthquake, although it left cracks in the granite walls and the entire structure tilted seven centimetres. It underwent renovation in 2009 to dismantle and repair the wooden interior and make repairs to the wooden exterior; this work was completed in 2014.

== Construction ==
The outer enceinte was built of granite from the Shiwaku Islands and the inner two-storey structure was made of keyaki (Japanese elm) wood harvested from the Nunobiki and Tekkai mountains in Kobe.

== Current status ==
The battery now lies within the compound of Mitsubishi Heavy Industries' Kobe shipyards. The first floor is open to viewing (with prior booking) once a month and for small group tours upon prior arrangement.
