= Miidani Kofun Cluster =

Miidani Kofun cluster
- 箕谷古墳群 (Japanese)
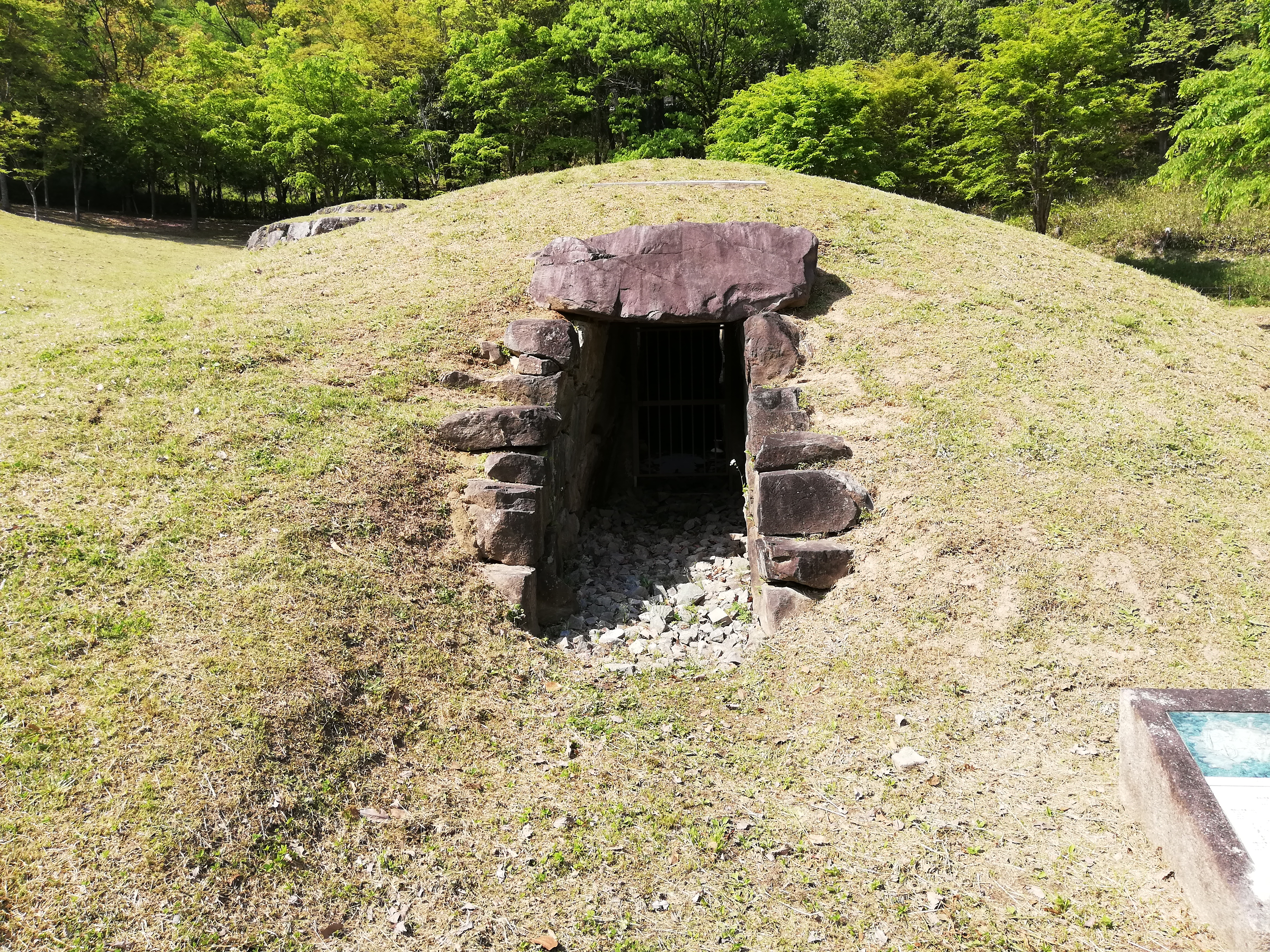
- Miidani Kofun-gun

- Miidani Kofun-gun Miidani Kofun Cluster (Japan)
- Interactive map of Miidani Kofun cluster
- 35°24′1″N 134°45′13″E
- Type: Kofun cluster
- Periods: Kofun period
- Location: Yabu, Hyōgo, Japan
- Region: Kansai region

History
- Built: c.6th-7th century

Site notes
- Public access: Yes (No facilities)

The Miidani Kofun cluster (箕谷古墳群) is a group of Kofun period burial mounds, located in the Yokachō Koyama neighborhood of the city of Yabu, Hyōgo in the Kansai region of Japan. The group consists of five tumuli, four of which were collectively designated a National Historic Site of Japan in 1992.

== Overview ==
The Miidani Kofun cluster is located in the center of the Tajima region, on a hill on the left bank of the lower reaches of the Yagi River, at an elevation of 83 to 93 meters. The group consists of four small enpun (円墳)-style (circular) burial mounds, all of which have been considerably flattened by erosion, exposing the horizontal stone burial chambers. The No.2 tumulus was slightly oval, measuring 12 by 14 meters; the No.3 tumulus was even more oval at 13.5 by 9.5 meters, and had fukiishi. The No.4 tumulus and No.5 tumulus were more circular, with a diameters of seven meters and six meters respectively. The No.1 tumulus is located further to the west, and is not part of the National Historic Site designation.

From grave goods recovered during an archaeological excavation conducted in 1983, it is estimated that the No.2 tumulus was built from the end of the 6th century to the beginning of the 7th century, the No.3 tumulus and No.4 tumulus in the middle of the 7th century, and the No.5 tumulus in the latter half of the 7th century. Some 103 items were recovered, including many examples of Sue ware pottery, iron rings, iron horse harnesses, and iron swords. Of especial note was an iron sword recovered from the No.2 tumulus, which an X-ray analysis at the Nara National Research Institute for Cultural Properties revealed had a Chinese calendar dated copper-inlay inscription corresponding to 608 AD. This is the same year that Ono no Imoko departed on the Third embassy to Sui China.

The site is now a public park, and is located about 13 minutes by car from Yōka Station on the JR West San'in Main Line.

== Gallery ==
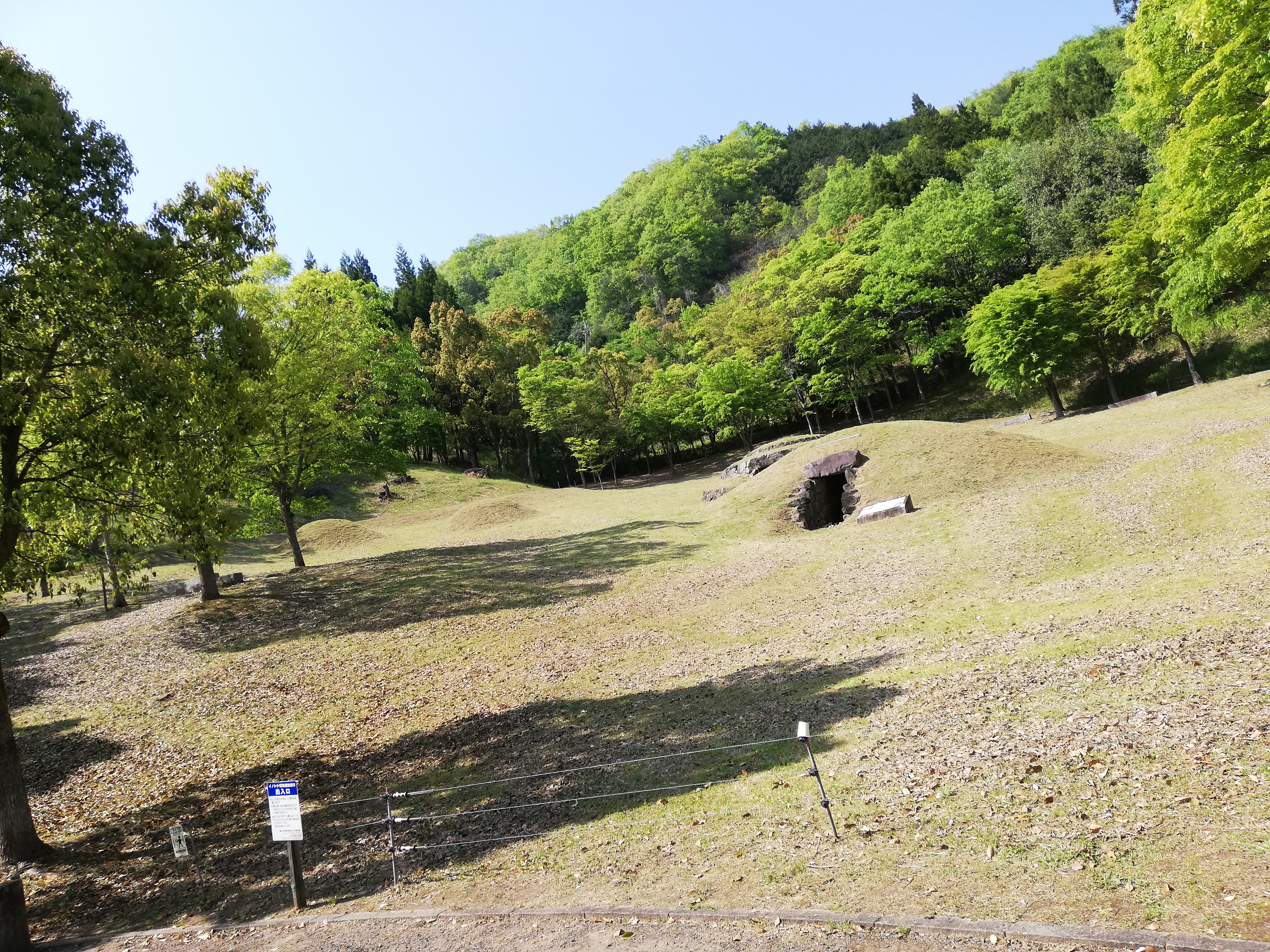
Panorama

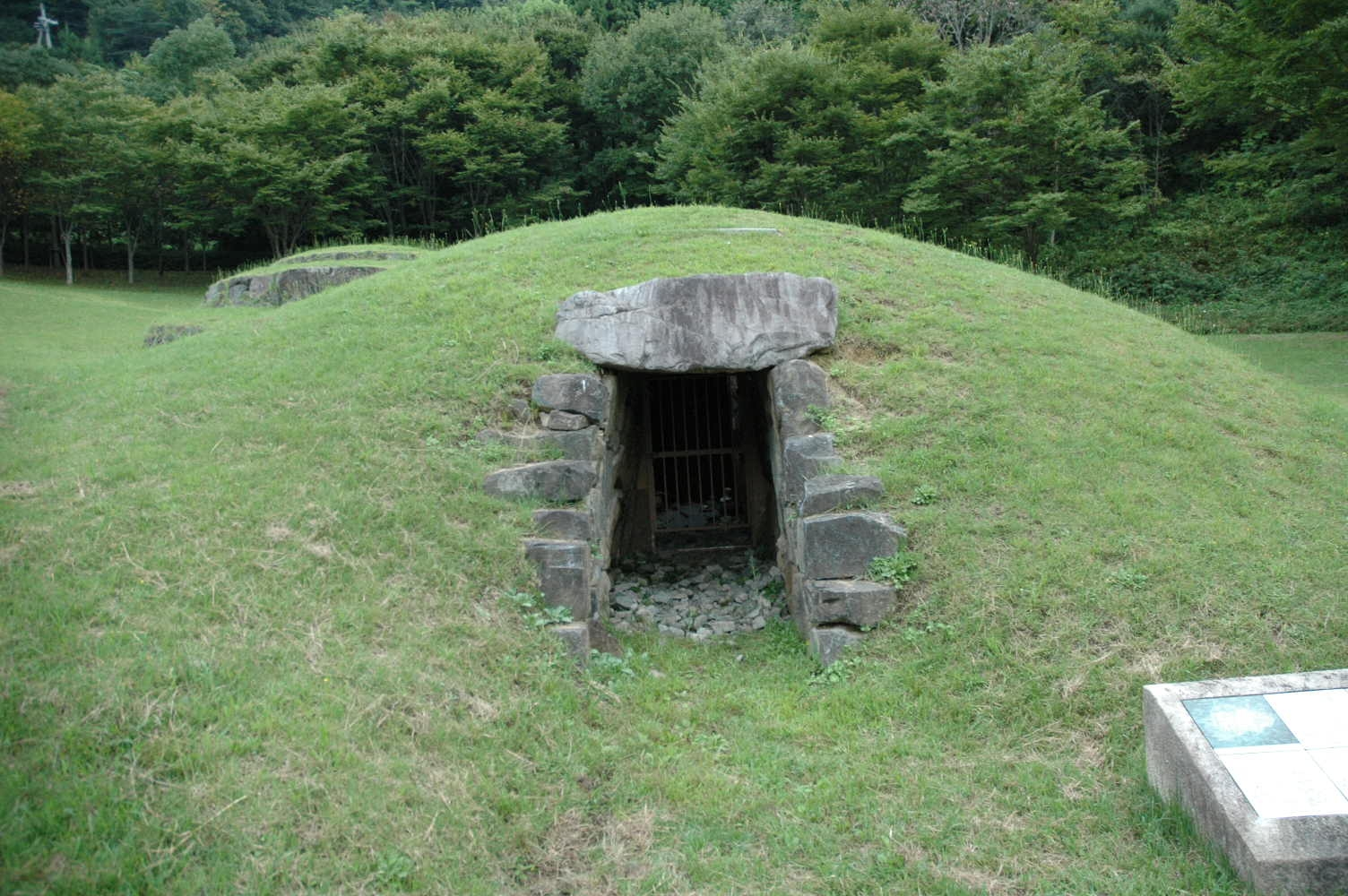
Tumulus No.2

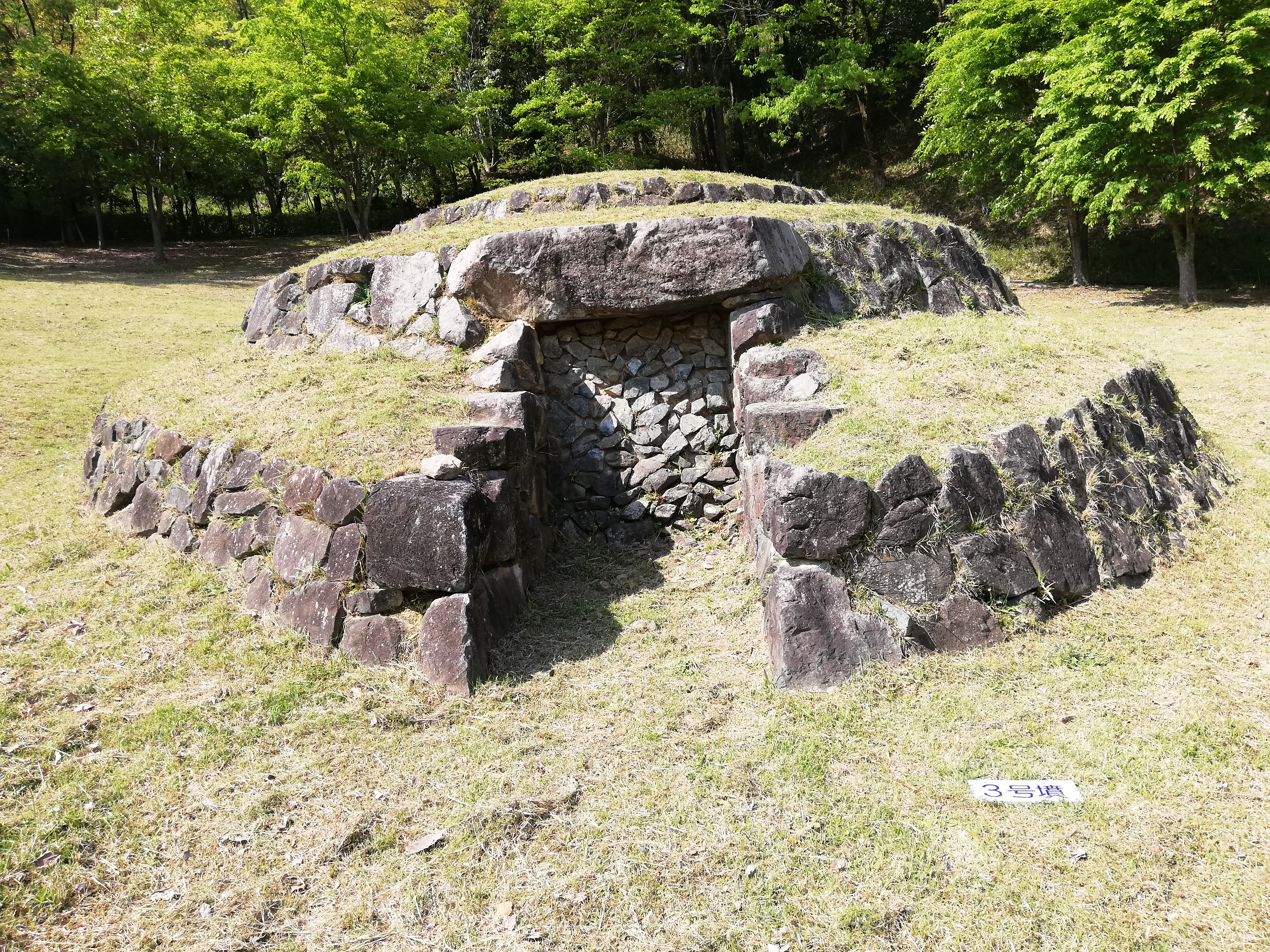
Tumulus No.3

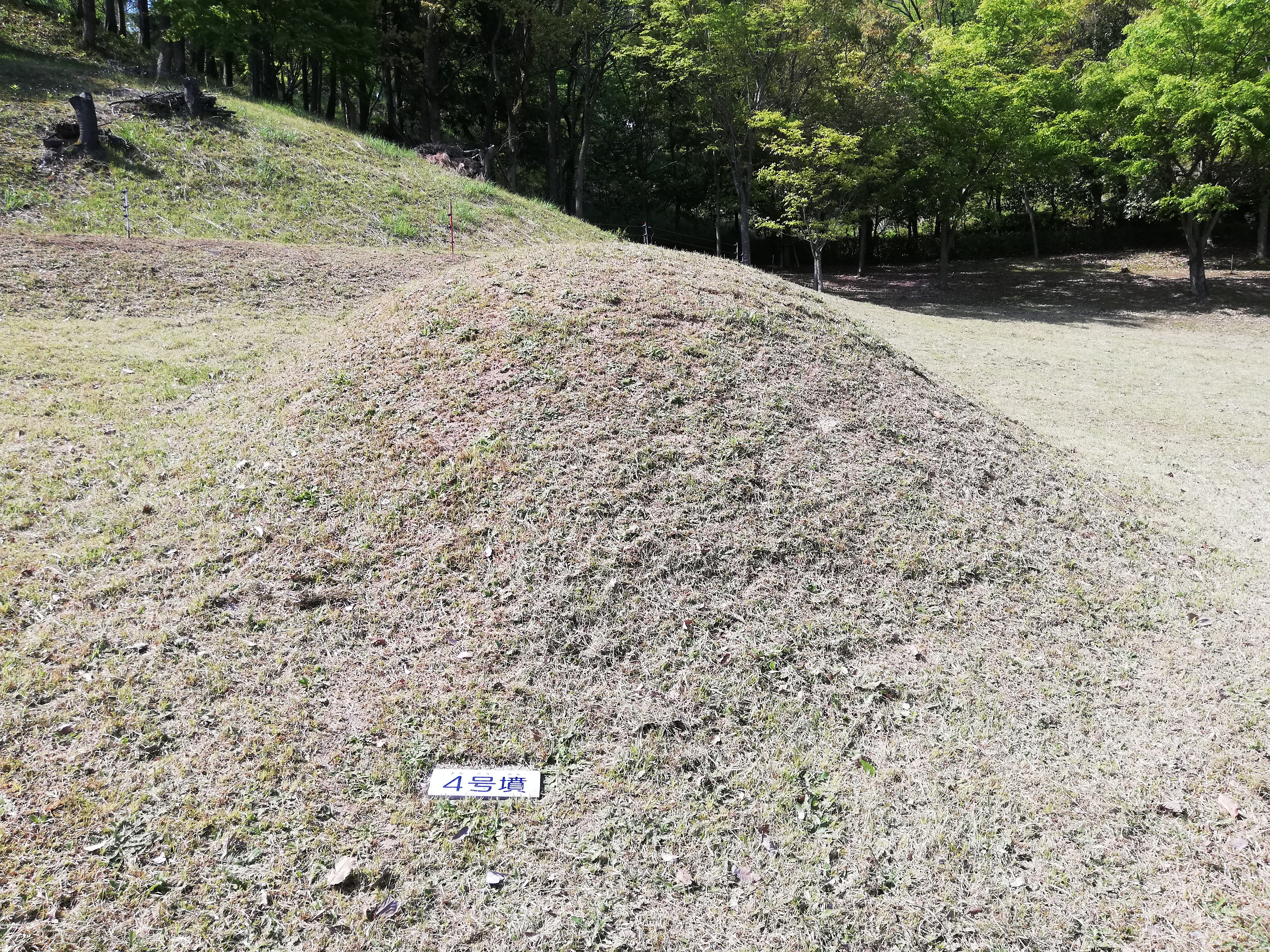
Tumulus No.4

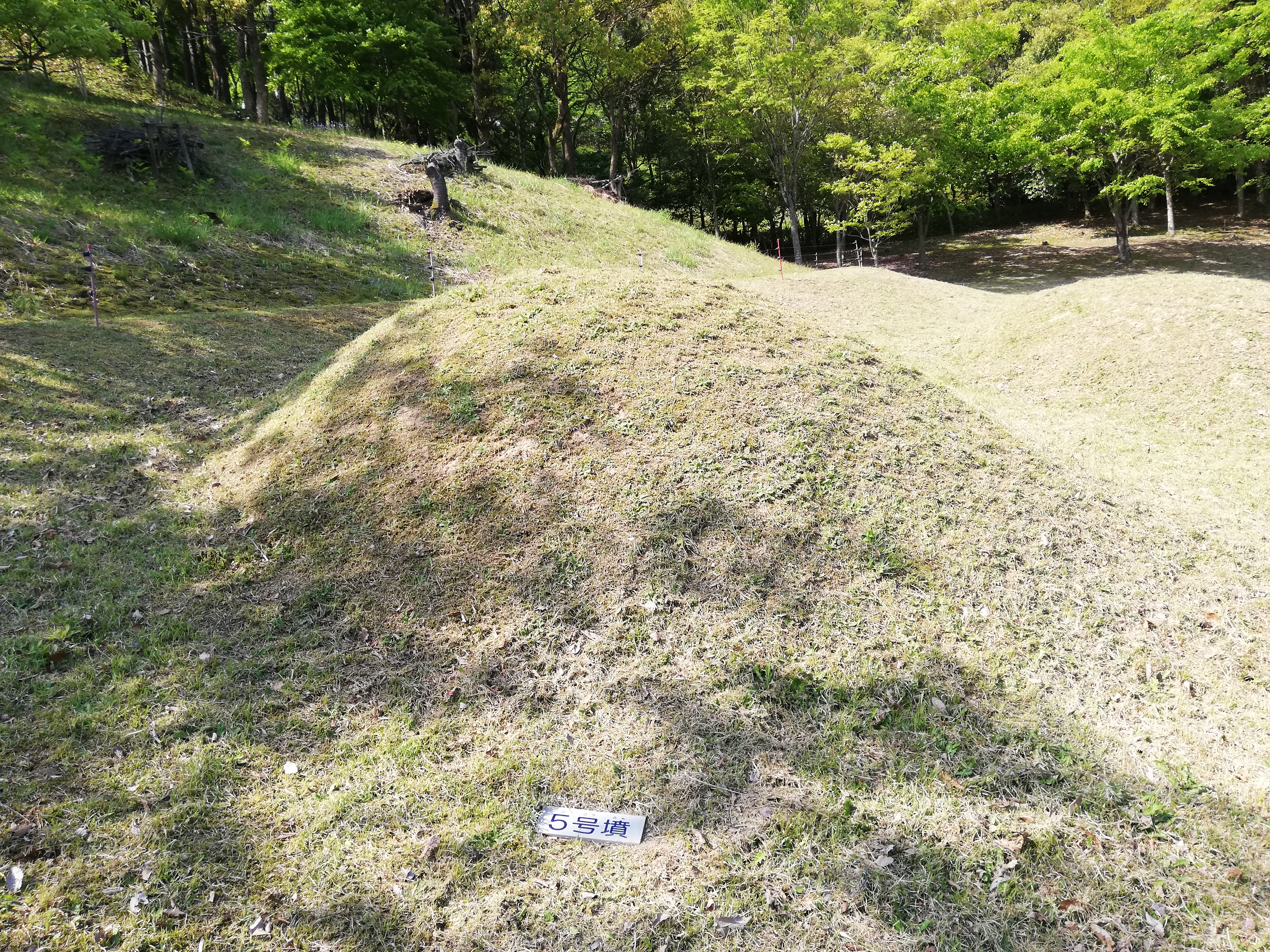
Tumulus No.5

== See also ==
- List of Historic Sites of Japan (Hyōgo)
