= Egenoyama Site =

Yayoi period settlement trace in Ashiya, Hyōgo, Japan

Egenoyama site
- 会下山遺跡 (Japanese)
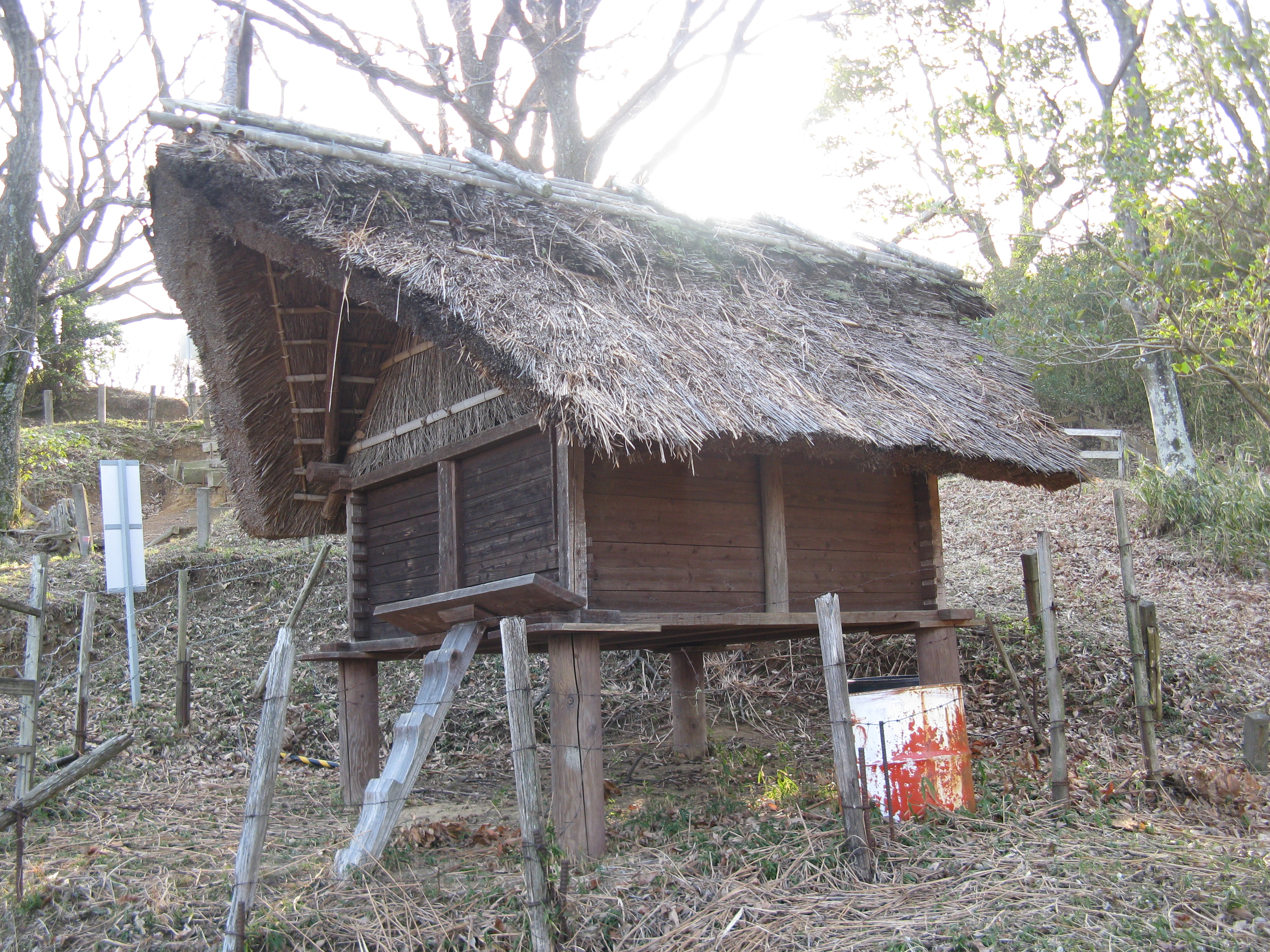
- Reconstruction at Egenoyama site

- Egenoyama site Egenoyama Site (Japan)
- 34°44′26.9″N 135°17′28.1″E
- Type: Settlement trace
- Periods: Yayoi period
- Location: Ashiya, Hyōgo, Japan
- Region: Kansai region

Site notes
- Public access: Yes (park )
- National Historic Site of Japan

The Egenoyama Site (会下山遺跡, Egenoyama iseki) is an archaeological site with the traces of a Yayoi period settlement located in the Sanjo neighborhood of the city of Ashiya, Hyōgo Prefecture, in the Kansai region of Japan. It was designated a National Historic Site in 2011.

== Overview ==
The Egenoyama site dated from the middle to late Yayoi period, and is centered on the Maeyama ridge at an altitude of 201 meters in the southern part of the Rokkō Mountain Range. It was discovered in 1954 after Yayoi pottery was found in the area by students at Ashiya Municipal Yamate Junior High School, and excavated in 1954. A total of 16 pit dwellings traces were found, including one large pit building with religious relics, along with a raised -floor granary. In addition, burnt pits, pit graves, and rows of fences were also confirmed. Pottery such as pots and jars from the middle to late Yayoi period was found to have been imported from Omi, eastern Settsu, Kawachi, Harima, and Sanuki Provinces. In addition to stone tools, iron products such as iron arrowheads and cast iron axes were also unearthed, as well as a Chinese-style three-winged arrowhead, which is rare in the Japanese archipelago. The site was a highland settlement but according to recent research, may have also extends to the hill slopes.

The site is about a 20-minute walk from Ashiyagawa Station on the Hankyu Kobe Main Line.

== See also ==
- List of Historic Sites of Japan (Hyōgo)
