= Museum of Nature and Human Activities, Hyōgo =

Museum in Sanda, Hyōgo Prefecture, Japan

- 兵庫県立人と自然の博物館
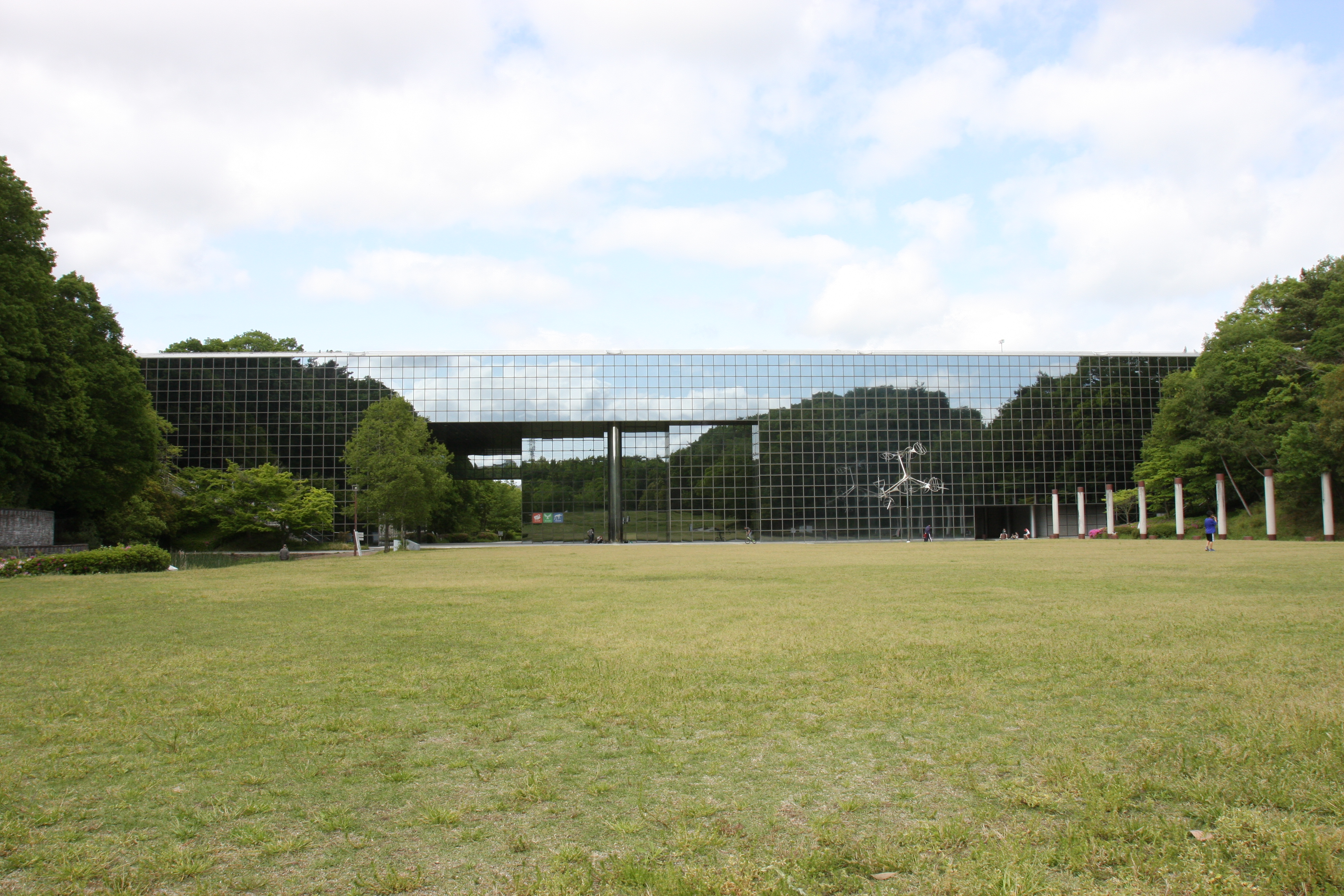
- Interactive map of the Museum of Nature and Human Activities, Hyōgo area

General information
- Location: 6 Yayoigaoka, Sanda, Hyōgo Prefecture, Japan
- Coordinates: 34°53′09″N 135°11′59″E
- Opened: 10 October 1992

Website
- Official website

The Museum of Nature and Human Activities, Hyōgo (兵庫県立人と自然の博物館, Hyōgo kenritsu hito to shizen no hakubutsukan), sometimes referred to by its abbreviated Japanese name of Hitohaku (ひとはく), is a prefectural museum of natural history in Sanda, Hyōgo Prefecture, Japan. The museum opened in 1992. The collection includes many geological and biological specimens.

== See also ==
- Biological type specimens reposed at Hitohaku
- Hyōgo Prefectural Museum of Archaeology
