= Nishinomiya Battery =

- 西宮砲台 (Japanese)
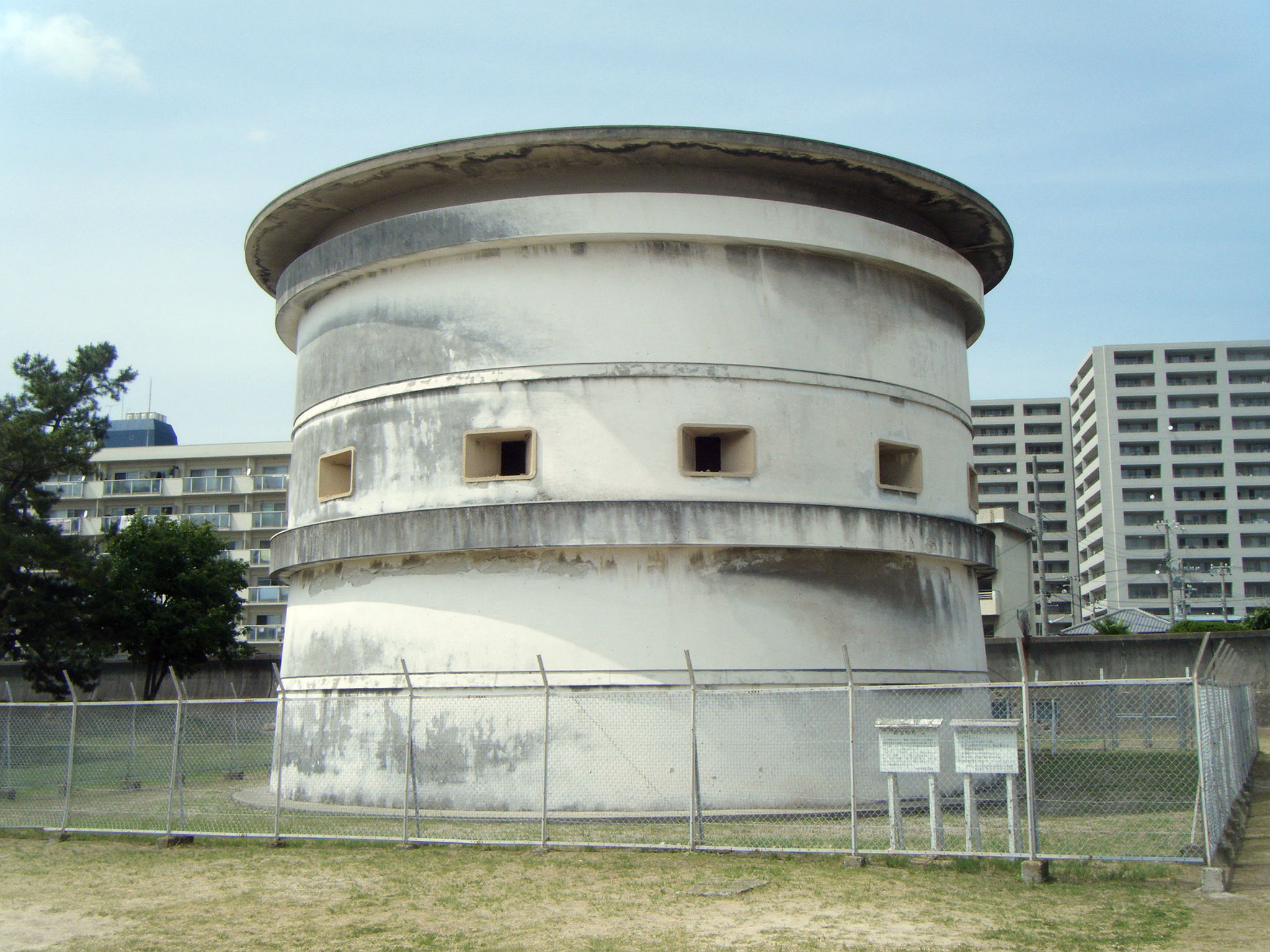
- Nishinomiya Battery

- Location within Hyōgo Prefecture Location within Japan
- 34°43′27″N 135°19′58.4″E
- Type: fortification
- Location: Nishinomiya, Hyōgo, Japan

History
- Built: 1863–1866
- National Historic Site of Japan

The Nishinomiya Battery (西宮砲台, Nishinomiya hōdai) was a Bakumatsu period coastal artillery battery erected by the Tokugawa shogunate on the coast of Osaka Bay of what is now the Nishihato-cho neighborhood of the city of Nishinomiya, Hyōgo Prefecture in the Kansai region of Japan. Its ruins were designated a National Historic Site in 1922.

== Background ==
In the late Edo period, the Tokugawa shogunate was increasing alarmed by incursions by foreign ships into Japanese territorial waters, fearing that these kurofune warships of the United States or other Western powers would attempt to end Japan's self-imposed national isolation policy by force, or would attempt an invasion of Japan by landing hostile military forces. Numerous feudal domains were ordered to establish fortifications along their coastlines with shore artillery located at strategic locations. The most critical locations were perceived to be at Edo Bay, where the shogunal capital was situated, and Osaka Bay, which controlled the seaward approaches to the imperial capital of Kyoto. Matters were rendered critical when a Russian warship appeared in Osaka Bay in 1854. Construction of this battery began in 1863 and was completed in 1866.The design of the fortification was by Katsu Kaishū, who supervised the construction with the assistance of the nearby Kobe Naval Training Center.

The design was a cylindrical bastion with a height of 12 meters, inner diameter of 17 meters, and a wall thickness of 1.53 meters at the bottom, tapering to 1.21 meters at the top. The exterior walls are plastered, and the interior is arranged into three stories. The ground floor was tamped earth, with a central pit for gun barrel cooling with a well, and a slab-floored gunpowder magazine. The second floor was wooden, and had 11 cannons, with one additional port left open on the north side to permit the receiving of instructions from outside. Granite for the walls of the structure were quarried on islands offshore Okayama Prefecture. After completion, the bastion was tested once with cannons firing blank charges. However, it was immediately discovered that the inside of the structure filled with smoke, rendering it useless in combat, and it was never used again. The structure was partially destroyed by a fire in 1884, and the property was sold by the Imperial Japanese Army in the early 1900s to the Hanshin Electric Railway.

The bastion is located in Omaehama Park, roughly halfway between Nishinomiya Port in the east and the Shukugawa River in the west, 2.3 kilometers south of Hankyu Shukugawa Station.

== See also ==
- List of Historic Sites of Japan (Hyōgo)
