= List of historic sites of Japan (Hyōgo) =

This list is of the historic sites of Japan located within the Prefecture of Hyōgo.

== National Historic Sites ==
As of 1 January 2021, fifty-one Sites have been designated as being of national significance (including one *Special Historic Site).

Site	Municipality	Comments	Image	Coordinates	Type	Ref.
*Himeji Castle Site 姫路城跡 Himeji-jō ato	Himeji	Edo Period castle	Himeji Castle Site	34°50′13″N 134°41′36″E	2	1865
Akashi Castle Site 明石城跡 Akashi-jō ato	Akashi	Edo Period castle	Akashi Castle Site	34°39′09″N 134°59′30″E	2	3404
Akashi Domain Maiko Battery Site 明石藩舞子台場跡 Akashi-han Maiko daiba ato	Tarumi-ku, Kobe	Bakumatsu period fortification	Akashi Domain Maiko Battery Site	34°37′59″N 135°01′57″E	2	00003516
Akamatsu Clan Castle ruins 赤松氏城跡 Akamatsu-shi shiro ato	Aioi, Himeji, Kamigōri	Muromachi period castles; designation includes the sites of Shirahata Castle (白旗城跡), Kanjōsan Castle (感状山城跡) (pictured), and Okishio Castle (置塩城跡)	Akamatsu Clan Castle ruins	34°54′33″N 134°22′45″E	2	1905
Akō Castle ruins 赤穂城跡 Akō-jō ato	Akō	Edo Period castle ruins	Akō Castle ruins	34°44′47″N 134°23′20″E	2	1890
Arioka Castle ruins 有岡城跡 Arioka-jō ato	Itami	Sengoku period castle ruins	Arioka Castle ruins	34°46′50″N 135°25′15″E	2	1895
Awaji Kokubun-ji Pagoda ruins 淡路国分寺塔跡 Awaji Kokubunji tō ato	Minamiawaji	Nara period provincial temple of Awaji Province	Awaji Kokubun-ji Pagoda ruins	34°17′53″N 134°46′58″E	3	1878
Ishi no Hōden - Tatsuyama Stone Quarry Site 石の宝殿及び竜山石採石遺跡 Ishi no hōden oyobi Tatsuyama ishi saiseki iseki	Takasago	Kofun period monolith and quarry site	Ishi no Hōden - Tatsuyama Stone Quarry Site	34°45′57″N 134°47′26″E	6	00003860
Itami temple ruins 伊丹廃寺跡 Itami haiji ato	Itami	Nara-Kamakura period temple ruins	Itami Haiji Site	34°47′50″N 135°24′25″E	3	1886
Egenoyama Site 会下山遺跡 Egenoyama iseki	Ashiya	Yayoi period settlement trace	Egenoyama Site	34°44′27″N 135°17′29″E	1	00003705
Engyō-ji Precinct 円教寺境内 Engyōji keidai	Himeji	noted Buddhist temple	Engyōji Precinct	34°53′29″N 134°39′23″E	2	1870
Ōishi Yoshio Residence Site 大石良雄宅跡 Ōishi Yoshio taku ato	Akō	Edo Period samurai residence	Ōishi Yoshio Residence Site	34°44′55″N 134°23′19″E	8	1860
Ōnaka Site 大中遺跡 Ōnaka iseki	Harima	Yayoi - Kofun period settlement trace	Ōnaka Site	34°43′38″N 134°52′38″E	1	1887
Otomezuka Kofun 処女塚古墳 Otomezuka kofun	Higashinada-ku, Kobe	Kofun period tumulus	Otomezuka Kofun	34°42′40″N 135°14′50″E	1	1858
Kaibara Jin'ya Site 柏原藩陣屋跡 Kaibara-han jinya ato	Tamba-Sasayama	Edo Period daimyō residence site	Kaibara Domain Jin'ya Site	35°07′44″N 135°04′56″E	2	1889
Kamo Site 加茂遺跡 Kamo iseki	Kawanishi	Yayoi period settlement trace		34°49′12″N 135°24′21″E	1	3256
Kusunoki Masashige Grave Stele 楠木正成墓碑 Kusunoki Masashige bohi	Chūō-ku, Kobe	Muromachi period hero's grave at Minatogawa Jinja	Kusunoki Masashige Grave Stele	34°40′52″N 135°10′35″E	2, 7, 8	1876
Kuroi Castle ruins 黒井城跡 Kuroi-jō ato	Tanba	Sengoku period castle ruins	Kuroi Castle ruins	35°10′44″N 135°06′15″E	2	1900
Kōdo temple ruins 広渡廃寺跡 Kōdo haiji ato	Ono	Asuka period temple ruins		34°52′00″N 134°56′23″E	3	1897
Goshikizuka (Sentsubo) Kofun - Kotsubo Kofun 五色塚（千壺）古墳 小壺古墳 Goshikizuka (Sentsubo) kofun - Kotsubo kofun	Tarumi-ku, Kobe	Kofun period tumuli	Goshikizuka (Sentsubo) Kofun - Kotsubo Kofun	34°37′47″N 135°02′45″E	1	1856
Gossa Kaito Site 五斗長垣内遺跡 Gossa Kaito iseki	Awaji	Yayoi period settlement trace	Gossa Kaito Site	34°26′24″N 134°54′51″E	1	00003761
Saijō Kofun Cluster 西条古墳群 Saijō kofun-gun	Kakogawa	Kofun period tumuli cluster	Saijō Kofun Cluster	34°46′55″N 134°53′19″E	1	1891
Sasayama Castle ruins 篠山城跡 Sasayama-jō ato	Tamba-Sasayama	Edo period castle ruins	Sasayama Castle ruins	35°04′23″N 135°13′03″E	2	1884
San'yōdō Yamanoumaya site 山陽道野磨駅家跡 San'yōdō Yamanoumaya ato	Kamigōri	Heian period post station site		34°50′48″N 134°19′22″E	2, 6	00003505
Shingū Miyauchi Site 新宮宮内遺跡 Shingū Miyauchi iseki	Shingū	Yayoi period settlement trace		34°55′26″N 134°32′46″E	1	1898
Sumoto Castle ruins 洲本城跡 Sumoto-jō ato	Sumoto	Muromachi - Edo Period castle	Sumoto Castle ruins	34°20′15″N 134°54′10″E	2	3218
Takeda Castle ruins 竹田城跡 Takeda-jō ato	Asago	Sengoku period castle ruins	Takeda Castle ruins	35°17′58″N 134°49′43″E	2	1874
Tajima Kokubun-ji ruins 但馬国分寺跡 Tajima Kokubunji ato	Toyooka	Nara period provincial temple of Tajima Province	Tajima Kokubunji ruins	35°28′19″N 134°46′26″E	3	1902
Tada-in 多田院 Tada-in	Kawanishi	Shinto shrine dedicated to ancestors of the Minamoto clan		34°51′39″N 135°24′10″E	3	1877
Tada Silver and Copper Mining Site 多田銀銅山遺跡 Tada gindōzan iseki	Inagawa	former mine from Nara period to modern times		34°53′37″N 135°21′25″E	2, 6	00003880
Tano Site 田能遺跡 Tano iseki	Amagasaki, Itami	Yayoi period settlement trace		34°46′12″N 135°26′25″E	1	1888
Tamaoka Kofun Cluster 玉丘古墳群 Tamaoka kofun-gun	Kasai	Kofun period tumuli cluster	Tamaoka Kofun Cluster	34°55′38″N 134°50′45″E	1	1875
Danjōzan Kofun 壇場山古墳 第一、二、三古墳 Danjōzan kofun	Himeji	Kofun period tumuli cluster	Danjōzan Kofun	34°49′26″N 134°44′02″E	1	1857
Chasuriyama Kofun 茶すり山古墳 Chasuriyama kofun	Wadayama	Kofun period tumulus		35°18′34″N 134°51′40″E	1	3433
Tokushima Domain Matsuho Battery Site 徳島藩松帆台場跡 Tokushima-han Matsuho daiba ato	Awaji	Bakumatsu period fortification		34°36′29″N 135°00′09″E	2	00003504
Nakayamasōen Kofun 中山荘園古墳 Nakayamasōen kofun	Takarazuka	Kofun period tumulus	Nakayamasōen Kofun	34°49′12″N 135°21′47″E	1	3219
Nishinomiya Battery 西宮砲台 Nishinomiya hōdai	Nishinomiya	Bakumatsu period fortification	Nishinomiya Battery	34°43′27″N 135°19′58″E	2	1859
Nishimotomezuka Kofun 西求女塚古墳 Nishimotomezuka kofun	Nada-ku, Kobe	Kofun period tumulus	Nishimotomezuka Kofun	34°42′18″N 135°13′35″E	1	3418
Harima Kokubun-ji ruins 播磨国分寺跡 Harima Kokubunji ato	Himeji	Nara period provincial temple of Harima Province	Harima Kokubunji ruins	34°49′13″N 134°43′53″E	3	1855
Banshū Vineyard Site 播州葡萄園跡 Banshū budō-en ato	Inami	Meiji period winery ruins		34°44′37″N 134°56′55″E	4, 6	00003472
Hisagozuka Kofun 瓢塚古墳 Hisagozuka kofun	Himeji	Kofun period tumulus	Hisagozuka Kofun	34°49′04″N 134°36′00″E	1	1893
Miidani Kofun Cluster 箕谷古墳群 Miidani kofun-gun	Yabu	Kofun period tumuli cluster	Miidani Kofun Cluster	35°24′02″N 134°45′13″E	1	1903
Miki Castle ruins 三木城跡及び付城跡･土塁 Miki-jō ato oyobi tsuketari jiro ato ･ dorui	Miki	Sengoku period castle ruins; designation includes an associated castle site and earthen embankments	Miki Castle ruins	34°47′48″N 134°59′24″E	2	00003781
Mitsuzuka temple ruins 三ツ塚廃寺跡 Mitsuzuka haiji ato	Tamba	Asuka period temple ruins		35°12′38″N 135°08′32″E	3	1892
Yakami Castle ruins 八上城跡 Yakami-jō ato	Tamba-Sasayama	Sengoku period castle ruins	Yakami Castle ruins	35°03′42″N 135°15′21″E	2	3419
Yagi Castle ruins 八木城跡 Yagi-jō ato	Yabu	Kamakura - Muromachi period castle ruins	Yagi Castle ruins	35°23′23″N 134°42′35″E	2	1907
Yamana Clan Castle ruins 山名氏城跡 Yamana-shi shiro ato	Toyooka	Sengoku period castle ruins; designation includes the sites of Konosumiyama Castle (此隅山城跡) (pictured) and Arikoyama Castle (有子山城跡)	Yamana Clan Castle ruins	35°29′15″N 134°52′19″E	2	1906
Yoshima Kofun 吉島古墳 Yoshima kofun	Tatsuno	Kofun period tumulus	Yoshima Kofun	34°56′10″N 134°32′47″E	1	1894
Rikan Castle ruins 利神城跡 Rikan-jō ato	Sayō	Sengoku period castle ruins	Rikan Castle ruins	35°00′15″N 134°21′21″E	2	00003994
Wadamisaki Battery 和田岬砲台 Wada-misaki hōdai	Hyōgo-ku, Kobe	Bakumatsu period fortification	Wadamisaki Battery	34°39′08″N 135°11′06″E	2	1854
Funaki Site 舟木遺跡 Funaki Site	Awaji	Yayoi period settlement trace		34°32′35″N 134°57′13″E	4	00004115

== Prefectural Historic Sites ==
As of 1 May 2020, ninety-seven Sites have been designated as being of prefectural importance.

Site	Municipality	Comments	Image	Coordinates	Type	Ref.
Mausoleum of Ippen 一遍廟所; Ippen byōsho	Kobe	in the grounds of Shinkō-ji (真光寺)		34°39′51″N 135°10′13″E		for all refs see
Shiramizu-Hisagozuka Kofun 白水瓢塚古墳; Shiramizu-Hisagozuka kofun	Kobe			34°40′30″N 135°00′23″E		
Gogazuka Kofun 御願塚古墳; Gogazuka kofun	Itami			34°45′58″N 135°24′52″E		
Nakayamadera Kofun 中山寺古墳; Nakayamadera kofun	Takarazuka			34°45′58″N 135°24′52″E		
Shōfukuji Kofun 勝福寺古墳; Shōfukuji kofun	Kawanishi			34°50′16″N 135°24′51″E		
Kishi Kofun Cluster (No.2 Tumulus) 貴志古墳群 二号墳; Kishi kofun-gun ni-gō-fun	Sanda			34°54′15″N 135°12′11″E		
Sanda Ware Miwa Myōjin Kiln Sites 三田焼・三輪明神窯跡群; Sanda-yaki・Miwa Myōjin yōseki-gun	Sanda			34°53′40″N 135°13′46″E		
Takaoka Kiln Sites 高丘古窯跡群; Takaoka yōseki-gun	Akashi			34°42′08″N 134°57′11″E		
Taidera Haiji Pagoda Site 太寺廃寺塔跡附寺地出土瓦; Taidera haiji tō ato tsuketari tera-chi shutsudo kawara	Akashi	designation includes earthen tiles excavated from the temple site		34°39′14″N 135°00′14″E		
Saijō Haiji Site 西条廃寺跡; Saijō haiji ato	Kakogawa			34°47′02″N 134°53′13″E		
Atagozuka Kofun 愛宕塚古墳; Atagozuka kofun	Harima			34°43′10″N 134°52′57″E		
Takasago Horikawa Port and Former Kuraku Matsuemon Residence 高砂堀川湊及び工楽松右衛門旧宅; Takasago Horikawa minato oyobi Kuraku Matsuemon kyū-taku	Takasago			34°44′43″N 134°48′14″E		
Yakeyama Tumuli 焼山群集墳(第22~25号墳); Yakeyama gunshū-fun (dai nijūni~nijūgo gō-fun)	Ono	Mounds 22, 23, 24, 25		34°50′15″N 134°56′49″E		
Ōzuka Kofun 王塚古墳; Ōzuka kofun	Ono			34°51′14″N 134°55′52″E		
Michinokami Kofun 道ノ上古墳; Michinokami kofun	Nishiwaki			35°02′10″N 134°57′04″E		
Ryokufūdai Kilns (No.1 & No.2) 緑風台窯跡(1号窯・2号窯); Ryokufūdai yōseki (ichi-gō kama・ni-gō kama)	Nishiwaki	designation includes 104 vessels		34°58′34″N 134°56′58″E		
Okanoyama Kofun 岡ノ山古墳; Okanoyama kofun	Nishiwaki			35°00′03″N 135°00′03″E		
Gotōyama Kofun 後藤山古墳; Gotōyama kofun	Kasai	designation includes a house-shaped sarcophagus lid		34°51′38″N 134°50′39″E		
Yamanowaki Tile Kiln Site 山の脇瓦窯跡; Yamanowaki gayōseki	Kasai			34°54′24″N 134°52′56″E		
Five Hundred Arhats of Hōjō 北条の五百羅漢; Hōjō no gohyaku rakan	Kasai			34°56′14″N 134°49′45″E		
Komaruyama Tumulus No.1 小丸山一号墳; Komaruyama ichi-gō fun	Katō			34°56′57″N 134°59′16″E		
Higashiyama Kofun Cluster 東山古墳群; Higashiyama kofun-gun	Taka			35°04′31″N 134°55′02″E		
Mikoshizuka Kofun 御輿塚古墳; Mikoshizuka kofun	Himeji			34°52′12″N 134°41′52″E		
Suwa Cave 諏訪の岩穴; Suwa no iwaana	Himeji			34°54′55″N 134°46′22″E		
Yokoyama Kofun Cluster 横山古墳群一、二号墳; Yokoyama kofun-gun ichi-, ni-gō fun	Himeji	Tumuli No.1 and No.2		34°53′N 134°45′E		
Shimoōta Haiji Pagoda Site 下太田廃寺塔跡; Shimoōta haiji tō ato	Himeji			34°49′23″N 134°36′14″E		
Miyayama Kofun 宮山古墳; Miyayama kofun	Himeji			34°48′58″N 134°43′09″E		
Minonagatsuka Kofun 見野長塚古墳; Minonagatsuka kofun	Himeji			34°48′05″N 134°43′55″E		
Katayama Kofun 片山古墳; Katayama kofun	Himeji			34°55′30″N 134°44′05″E		
Mizoguchi Haiji 溝口廃寺跡; Mizoguchi haiji	Himeji			34°55′36″N 134°44′38″E		
Shiono Rokkaku Kofun - Shiono Kofun 塩野六角古墳附塩野古墳; Shiono Rokkaku kofun・Shiono kofun	Himeji			34°58′34″N 134°34′45″E		
Mino Kofun Cluster 見野古墳群; Mino kofun-gun	Himeji			34°48′20″N 134°43′24″E		
Fukumoto Site 福本遺跡; Fukumoto iseki	Kamikawa			35°02′59″N 134°46′10″E		
Kannonjiyama Kofun 観音寺山古墳; Kannonjiyama kofun	Ichikawa			34°59′41″N 134°44′53″E		
Myōtokusan Kofun 妙徳山古墳; Myōtokusan kofun	Fukusaki			34°57′35″N 134°46′20″E		
Nabano Kofun 那波野古墳; Nabano kofun	Aioi			34°49′21″N 134°29′43″E		
Wakasano Kofun 若狭野古墳; Wakasano kofun	Aioi			34°50′16″N 134°25′04″E		
Hashisaki Cliff Buddha 嘴崎磨崖仏; Hashisaki magai-butsu	Tatsuno			34°53′30″N 134°33′19″E		
Ubazuka Kofun 姥塚古墳; Ubazuka kofun	Tatsuno			34°54′09″N 134°32′09″E		
Tenjinyama No.1 Tumulus 天神山一号墳; Tenjinyama ichi-gō fun	Tatsuno			34°55′47″N 134°32′37″E		
Yakuyama No.1 Tumulus 養久山一号墳; Yakuyama ichi-gō fun	Tatsuno			34°50′25″N 134°31′15″E		
Koshizuka Kofun 輿塚古墳; Koshizuka kofun	Tatsuno			34°46′21″N 134°33′26″E		
Mikan-no-Hetayama Kofun みかんのへた山古墳; Mikan-no-Hetayama kofun	Akō			34°46′12″N 134°27′17″E		
Arinashiyama Kofun 蟻無山古墳; Arinashiyama kofun	Akō			34°50′07″N 134°23′11″E		
Noda No.2 Tumulus 野田二号墳; Noda ni-gō fun	Akō			34°51′00″N 134°22′30″E		
Kitoradani No.2 Tumulus 木虎谷二号墳; Kitoradani ni-gō fun	Akō			34°50′10″N 134°23′27″E		
Tsukayama No.6 Tumulus 塚山六号墳; Tsukayama roku-gō fun	Akō			34°50′21″N 134°24′00″E		
Unehara-Tanaka Site 有年原・田中遺跡; Unehara・Tanaka iseki	Akō			34°49′57″N 134°23′21″E		
Higashiune-Okita Site 東有年・沖田遺跡; Higashiune・Okita iseki	Akō			34°49′27″N 134°21′59″E		
Kurosaki Cemetery 黒崎墓所; Kurosaki bosho	Akō			34°45′38″N 134°25′55″E		
Ikaruga Estate Boundary Stones 鵤荘牓示石; Ikaruga no shōbōji ishi	Taishi			34°50′04″N 134°35′43″E		
Kurooka Jinja Kofun 黒岡神社古墳; Kurooka Jinja kofun	Taishi	designation includes a house-shaped sarcophagus		34°50′11″N 134°36′17″E		
Maruo Kofun 丸尾古墳; Maruo kofun	Kamigōri	designation includes a ceramic sarcophagus		34°52′35″N 134°21′48″E		
Nakayama Kofun Cluster 中山古墳群1、13、14号墳; Nakayama kofun-gun ichi-, jūsan-, jūyon-gō fun	Taishi	designation includes mounds 1, 13, and 14		34°52′N 134°23′E		
Inohashi Graves 井の端7号墓・8号墓; Inohashi nana-gō haka・hachi-gō haka	Taishi	designation includes graves 7 and 8		34°51′39″N 134°20′07″E		
Hōchō No.1 Tumulus 鳳張一号墳; Hōchō ichi-gō fun	Taishi			34°52′34″N 134°19′57″E		
Hōchō No.2 Tumulus 鳳張二号墳; Hōchō ni-gō fun	Taishi			34°52′34″N 134°19′54″E		
Nagao Haiji Pagoda Site 長尾廃寺塔跡; Nagao haiji tō ato	Sayō			35°00′42″N 134°21′32″E		
Aoki Dōtaku Excavation Site 青木銅鐸出土地; Aoki dōtaku shutsudo-chi	Shisō			35°02′18″N 134°29′06″E		
Kanaya Yamabe Kofun 金谷山部古墳; Kanaya Yamabe kofun	Shisō			34°59′30″N 134°32′03″E		
Hitotsuyama Kofun 一つ山古墳; Hitotsuyama kofun	Shisō			35°04′57″N 134°35′01″E		
Kōhoki Tatara Site 高保木たたら(製鉄)遺跡; Kōhoki tatara (seitetsu) iseki	Shisō			35°11′36″N 134°27′02″E		
Tengoya Iron Mine Site 天児屋鉄山跡; Tengoya tetsuzan ato	Shisō			35°12′50″N 134°25′04″E		
Nakanotani Shell Mound 中谷貝塚; Nakanotani kaizuka	Toyooka			35°31′55″N 134°51′10″E		
Miyake Tile Kiln Site 三宅瓦窯跡; Miyake Gayōseki	Toyooka			35°32′N 134°52′E		
Futami Kofun Cluster 二見谷古墳群; Futami kofun-gun	Toyooka			35°35′15″N 134°47′56″E		
Kegoya Kofun ケゴヤ古墳; Kegoya kofun	Toyooka			35°35′41″N 134°48′00″E		
Ojindani Kiln Site 鬼神谷窯跡; Ojindani yōseki	Toyooka			35°37′36″N 134°45′09″E		
Tatenui Kofun 楯縫古墳; Tatenui kofun	Toyooka			35°27′56″N 134°47′54″E		
Sannotani Decorated Kofun 三の谷壁画古墳; Sannotani hekiga kofun	Kami			35°27′10″N 134°35′48″E		
Bundō Kofun 文堂古墳; Bundō kofun	Kami			35°27′06″N 134°36′10″E		
Hachimanyama Kofun Cluster 八幡山古墳群; Hachimanyama kofun-gun	Kami	designation comprises four mounds and includes an assemblage of sixteen objects excavated from No.6 Tumulus		35°24′49″N 134°35′44″E		
Seikei Shoin 青谿書院; Seikei shoin	Yabu			35°26′21″N 134°46′18″E		
Kunigitogayama Kofun Cluster 国木とが山古墳群; Kunigitogayama kofun-gun	Yabu	designation comprises sixteen mounds		35°23′40″N 134°44′51″E		
Horihata No.1 Tumulus 堀畑1号墳; Horihata ichi-gō fun	Yabu			35°21′59″N 134°48′20″E		
Kannonzuka Kofun 観音塚古墳; Kannonzuka kofun	Yabu			35°22′24″N 134°47′11″E		
Kinrizuka Kofun (Ōyabu No.3 Tumulus) 禁裡塚古墳(大藪三号墳); Kinrizuka kofun (Ōyabu san-gō fun)	Yabu			35°23′52″N 134°48′01″E		
Nishinooka Kofun 西ノ岡古墳; Nishinooka kofun	Yabu			35°23′51″N 134°47′48″E		
Tsukayama Kofun 塚山古墳; Tsukayama kofun	Yabu			35°23′53″N 134°48′15″E		
Kōmorizuka Kofun こうもり塚古墳; Kōmorizuka kofun	Yabu			35°23′52″N 134°48′15″E		
Bekku Ueno Site 別宮家野遺跡; Bekku Ueno iseki	Yabu			35°23′17″N 134°33′43″E		
Komaruyama Kofun 小丸山古墳; Komaruyama kofun	Asago			35°21′05″N 134°51′58″E		
Ikeda Kofun 池田古墳; Ikeda kofun	Asago			35°20′26″N 134°50′34″E		
Funanomiya Kofun 船之宮古墳; Funanomiya kofun	Asago			35°15′36″N 134°48′15″E		
Futamazuka Kofun 二間塚古墳; Futamazuka kofun	Tanba			35°10′24″N 135°07′28″E		
Nonoma Site 野々間遺跡; Nonoma iseki	Tanba			35°09′39″N 135°07′32″E		
Sekigan-ji Chōishi 石龕寺町石; Sekiganji chōishi	Tanba	thirty stones		35°06′00″N 135°01′32″E		
Iwao Castle Site 岩尾城跡; Iwao-jō ato	Tanba			35°05′59″N 134°58′29″E		
Hōjō Kofun 北条古墳; Hōjō kofun	Tamba-Sasayama			35°05′26″N 135°18′37″E		
Doinouchi Earthworks and Moat 土居の内(土塁及び濠); Doinouchi (dorui oyobi hori)	Tamba-Sasayama			35°04′57″N 135°15′23″E		
Tamba Ware Old Kiln Site 丹波焼古窯跡; Tanba-yaki koyōseki	Tamba-Sasayama			35°01′N 135°07′E		
Shirasu Castle Site 白巣城跡; Shirasu-jō ato	Sumoto			34°22′46″N 134°49′36″E		
Takenokuchi Castle Site 炬口城跡; Takenokuchi-jō ato	Sumoto			34°21′10″N 134°53′24″E		
Gunge Kofun 郡家古墳; Gunge kofun	Awaji			34°28′24″N 134°50′57″E		
Furutsuji Bronze Sword Excavation Site 古津路銅剣出土地; Furutsuji dōken shutsudo-chi	Minamiawaji			34°20′01″N 134°44′05″E		
Dōtaku Excavation Site "Nakanomidō" 銅鐸出土地「中の御堂」 Dōtaku shutsudo-chi "Nakanomidō"	Minamiawaji			34°21′00″N 134°44′35″E		
Yagi Residence Site 養宜館跡; Yagi no yakata ato	Minamiawaji			34°18′19″N 134°47′43″E		

== Municipal Historic Sites ==
As of 1 May 2020, a further two hundred and thirty-eight Sites have been designated as being of municipal importance.

== See also ==
- Cultural Properties of Japan
- Awaji, Harima, Settsu, Tajima, and Tanba Provinces
- List of Places of Scenic Beauty of Japan (Hyōgo)
