= Ōnaka Site =

Yayoi period settlement trace in Harima, Japan

Ōnaka site
- 大中遺跡 (Japanese)
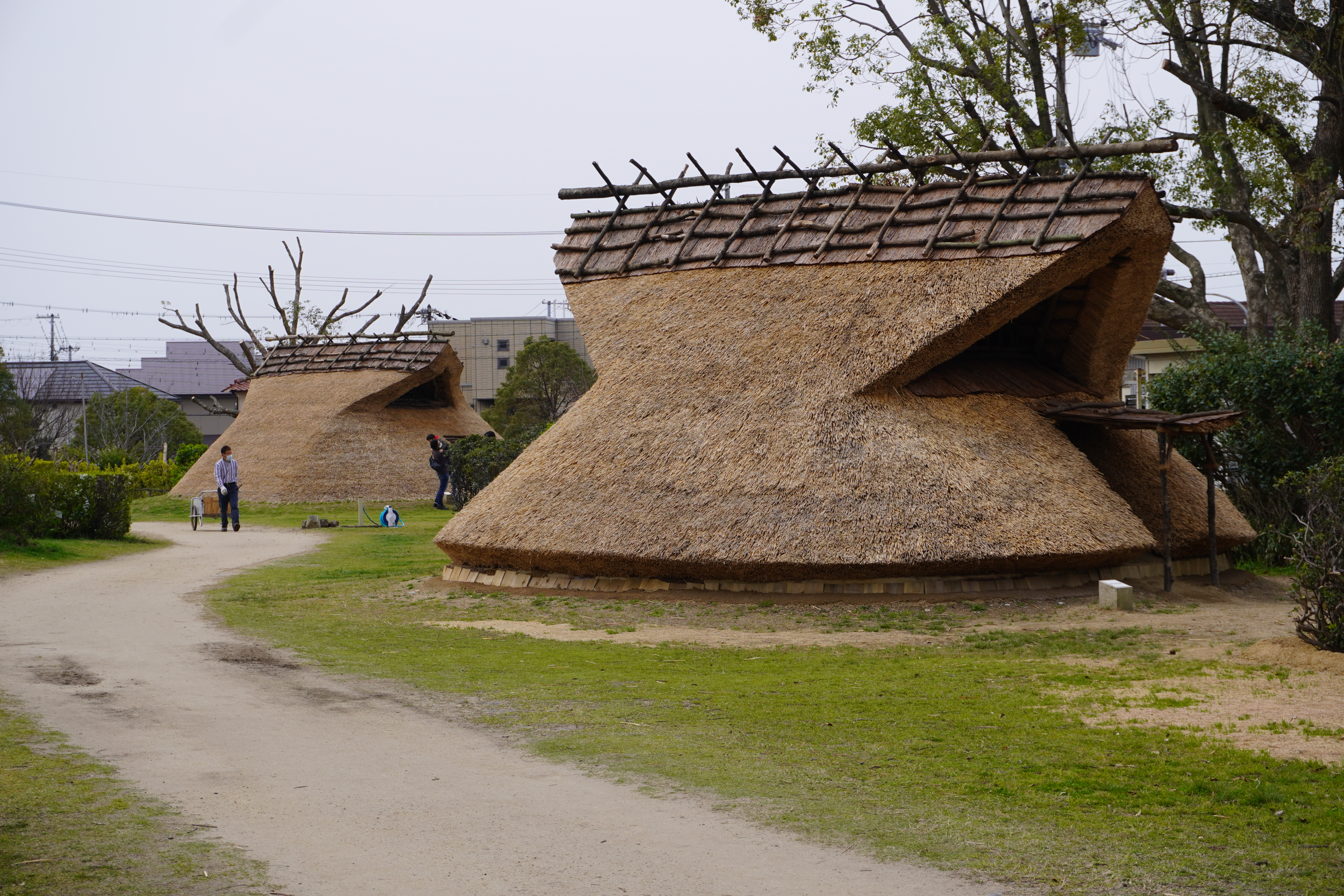
- Reconstructed pit dwellings at Ōnaka site

- Ōnaka site Ōnaka Site (Japan)
- Interactive map of Ōnaka site
- 34°43′37.7″N 134°52′38.2″E
- Type: Settlement trace
- Periods: Yayoi to Kofun period
- Location: Harima, Hyōgo, Japan
- Region: Kansai region

History
- Built: 3rd - mid-5th century AD

Site notes
- Public access: Yes (park and museum)

The Ōnaka site (大中遺跡, Ōnaka iseki) is an archaeological site with traces of a late Yayoi to Kofun period settlement in the town of Harima, Hyōgo Prefecture, in the Kansai region of Japan. The site was designated a National Historic Site in 1967.

== Overview ==
The Ōnaka site is located at the southern end of the Inamino plateau at an elevation of about 15 meters, and extends for about 500 meters from east-to-west and about 150 meters from north-to-south. The ruins are at the tip of a diluvial highland which gently slopes from east-to-west, surrounded by Tsuburemeike Pond to the north and Korigaiike Pond and Kisegawa River to the south, marking the eastern edge of the Kakogawa River flood plain. It is located two kilometers from the present-day coast line of the Seto Inland Sea.

The site was discovered on June 24, 1962 by three students from Harima Junior High School who were interested in archaeology and who had heard that a large quantity of earthenware shards had been unearthed during the construction of a nearby railway line in 1923. Exploring the area, they discovered shards of earthenware, ironware, whetstones, shells, octopus jars, and other artifacts. A local teacher identified the earthenware as Yayoi pottery and a report was filed with the Harima Town Board of Education. The first archaeological excavation was conducted in December 1962, with twenty more excavations conducted annually through 2003. Along with many more artifacts, the foundations of numerous pit dwellings, with various layouts, such as circular, square, and polygonal were discovered. Of especial note was a fragment of a Chinese-made bronze mirror. The buildings are distributed at intervals of 20 to 30 meters. No graves have been detected, and no remains of rice paddies or other evidences of agriculture.

The artifacts excavated from the Ōnaka site are on display at the Harima Town Folk Museum (播磨町郷土資料館, Harima-chō kyōdo shiryōkan). Since 1974, a number of reconstructions of pit dwellings have been built and the site has been opened to the public as the Prefectural Historic Site Park Onaka Archaeological Park (nicknamed "Harima Onaka Ancient Village"). On October 13, 2007, the Hyōgo Prefectural Archaeological Museum (兵庫県立考古博物館, Hyōgo kenritsu kōko hakubutsukan) located on adjacent land and incorporated into the park. The site is a 15-minute walk from Tsuchiyama Station on the JR West Sanyo Main Line.

== Gallery ==
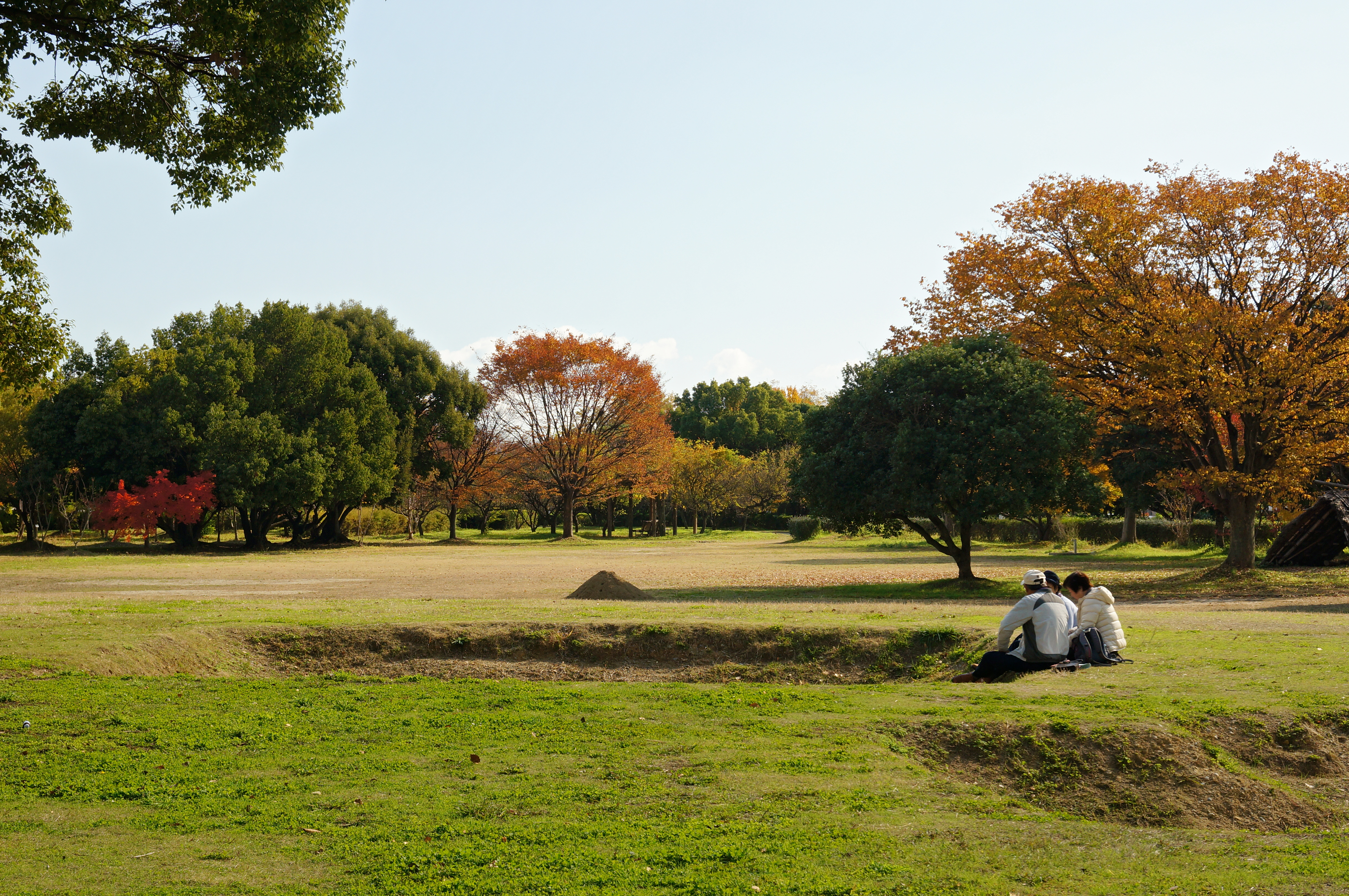
Site of pit dwelling

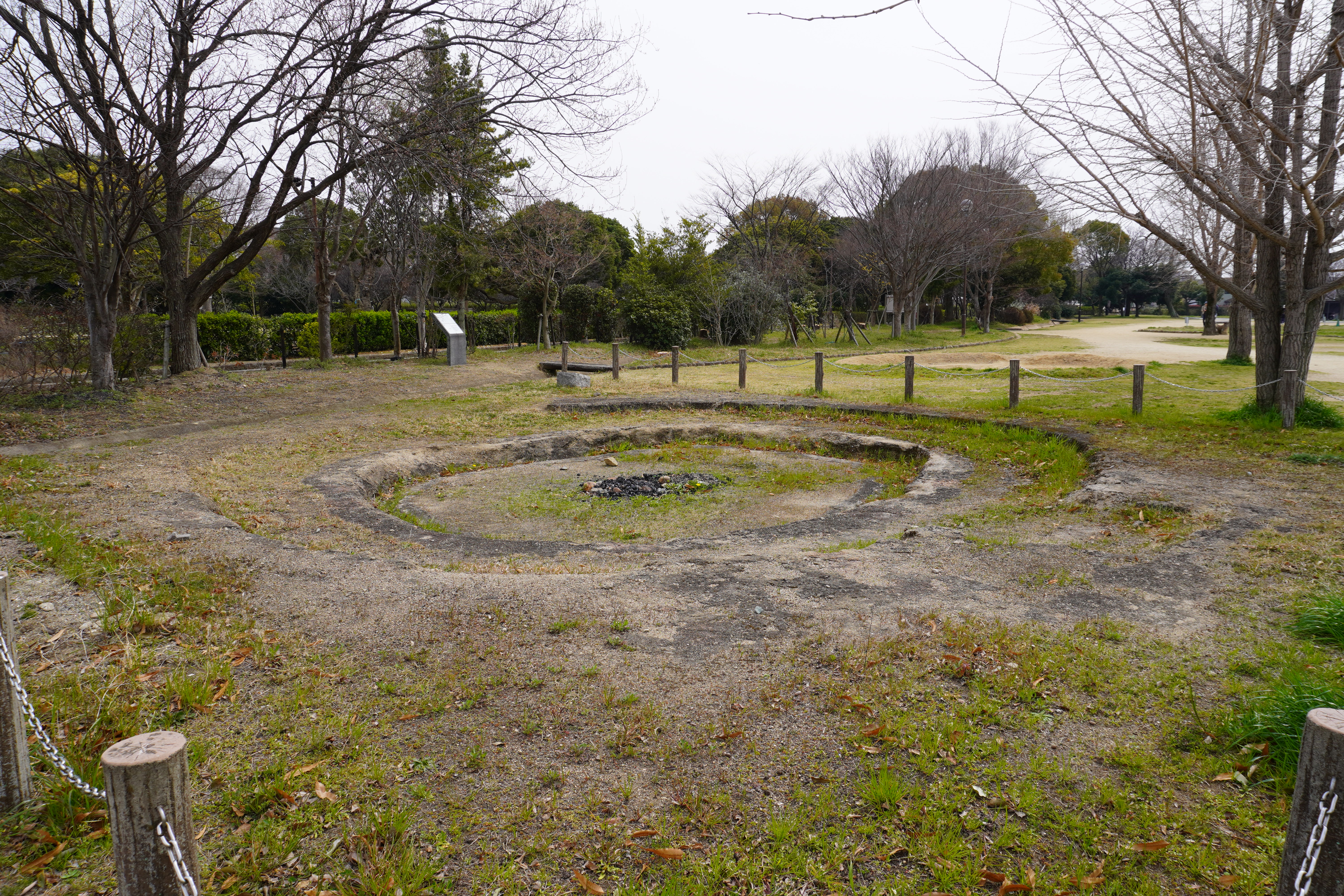
Site of pit dwelling

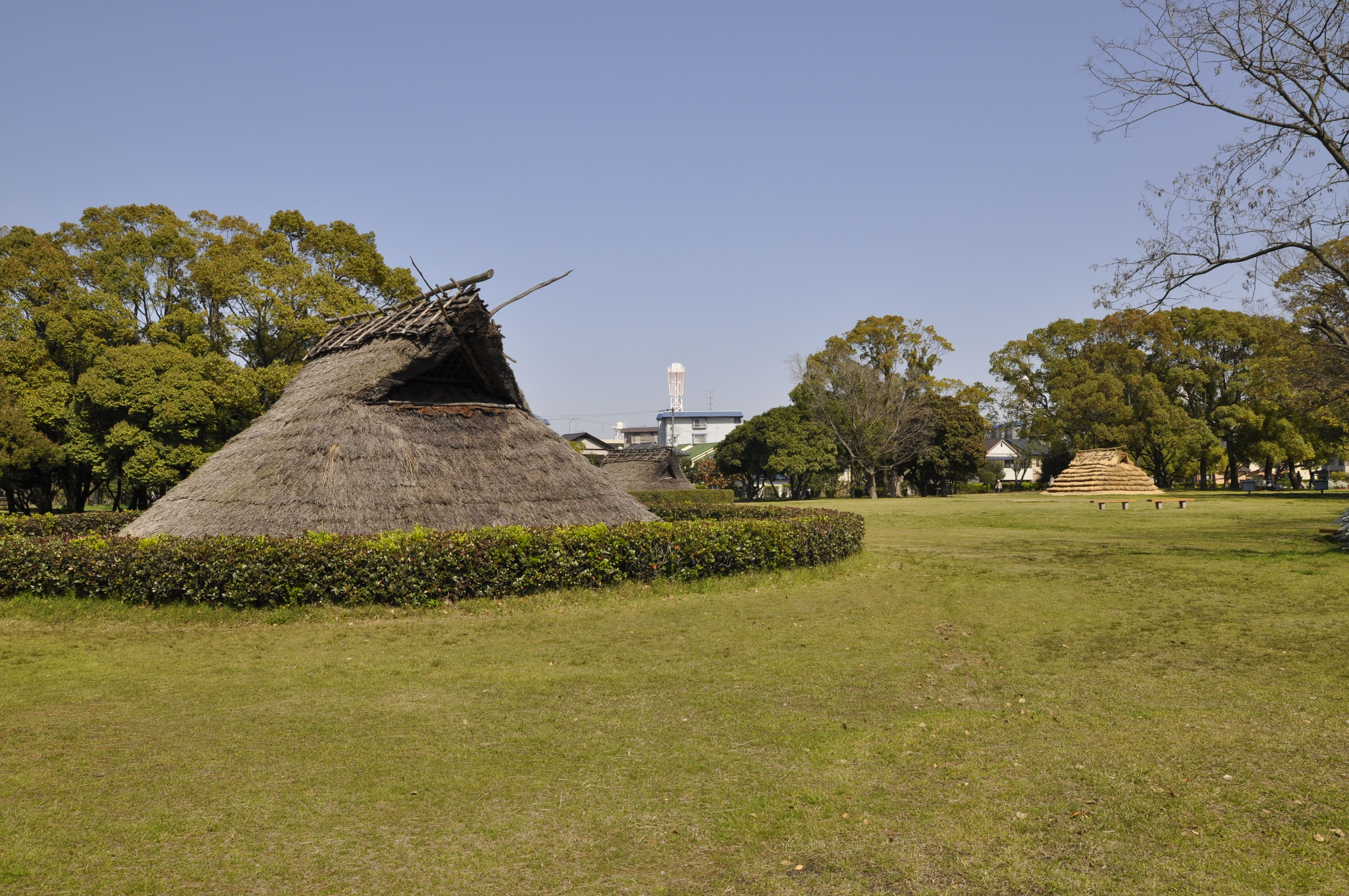
Reconstruction of pit dwelling

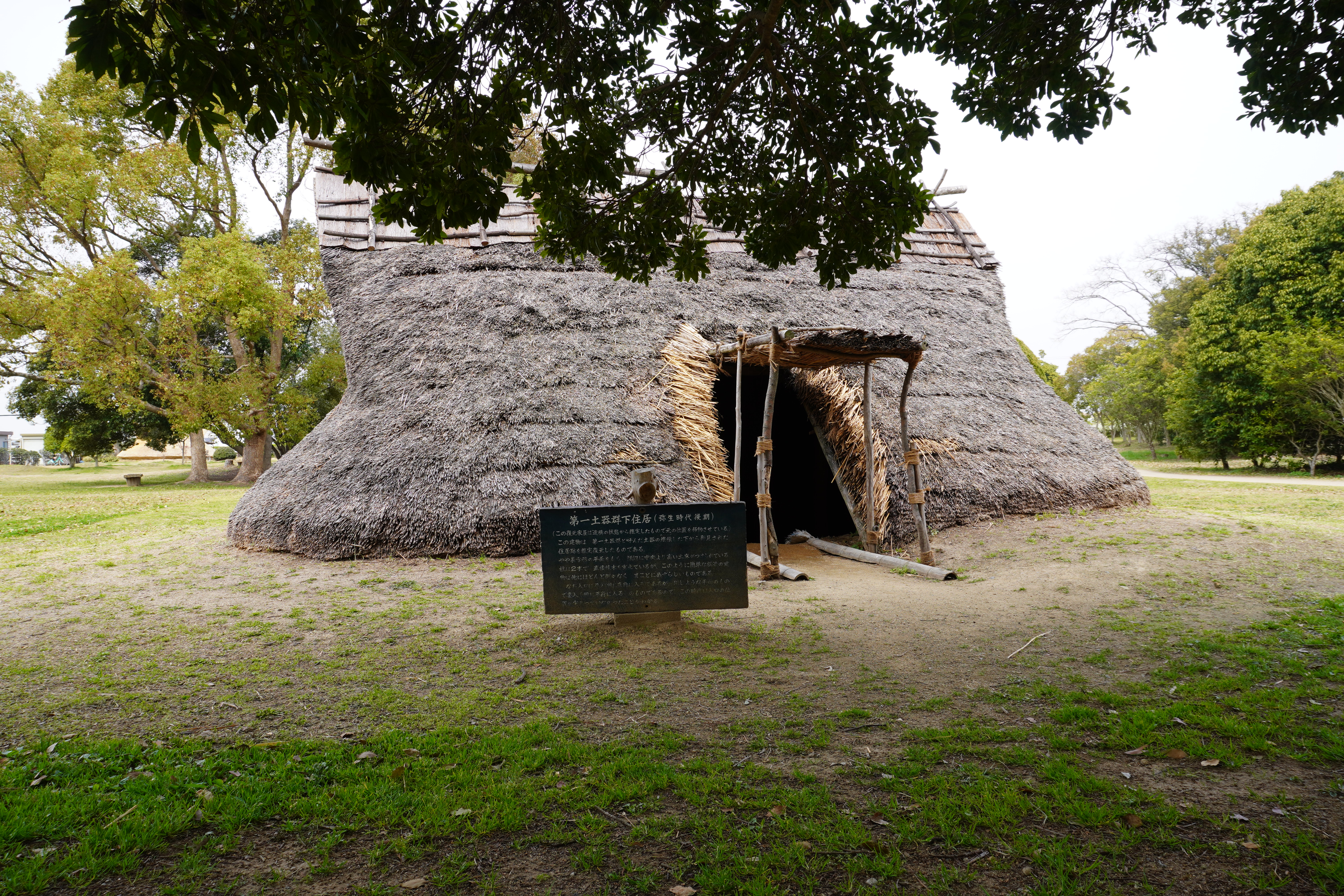
Reconstruction of pit dwelling

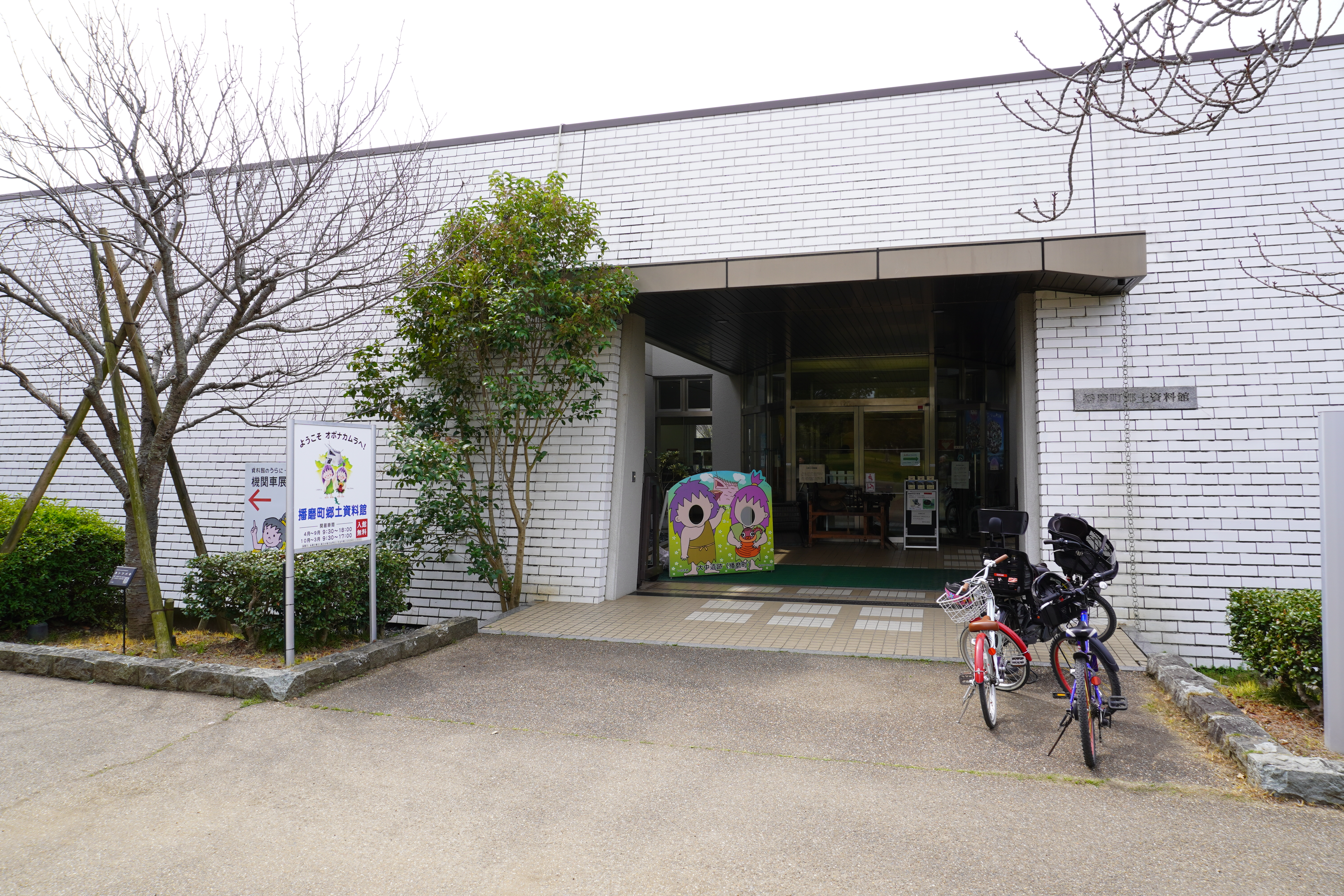
Harima Town Folk Museum

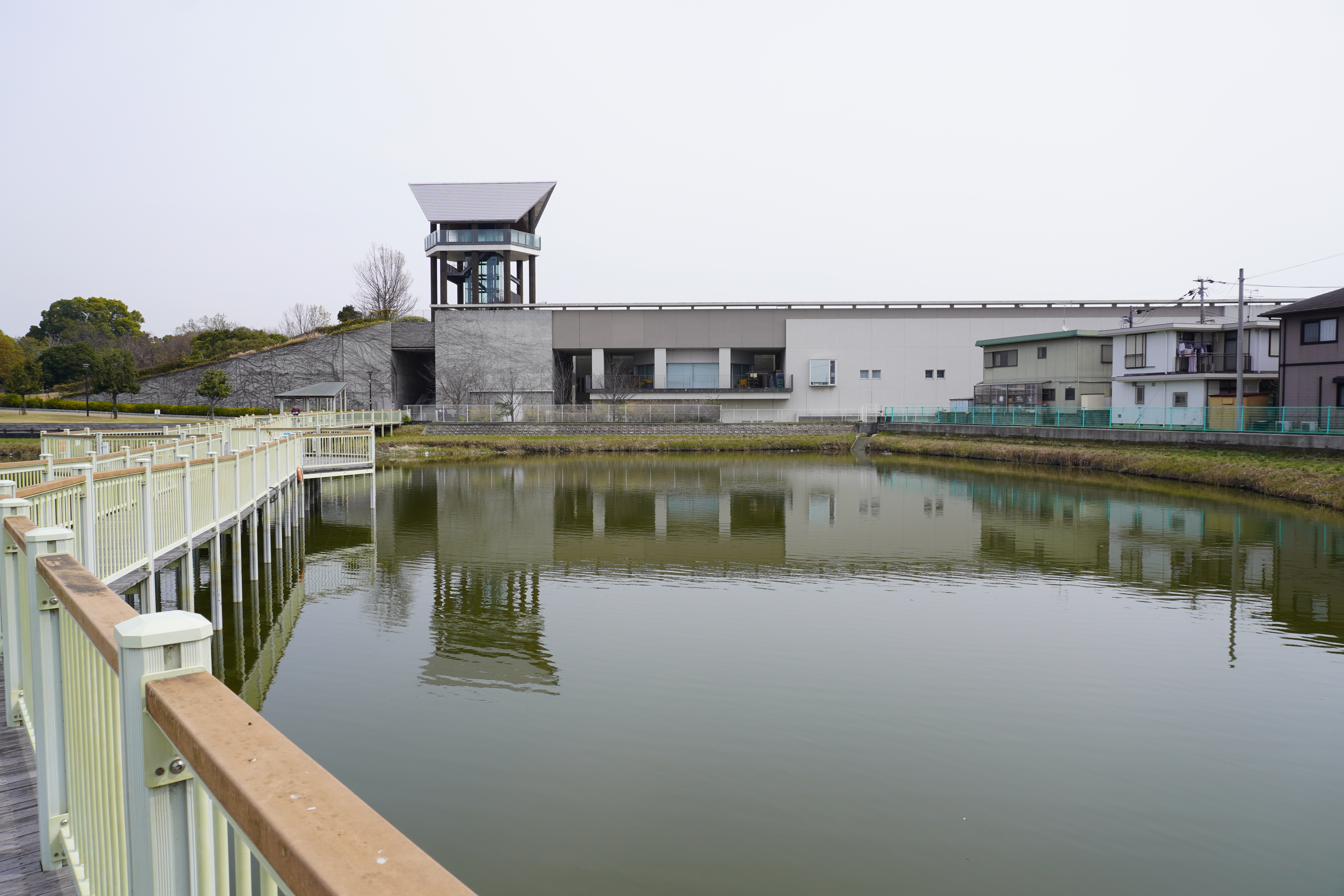
Hyōgo Prefectural Archaeological Museum

== See also ==
- List of Historic Sites of Japan (Hyōgo)
