= Yoka =

Yoka or Yōka may refer to

- Yoka (name)
- Yōka Station, a train station in Hyōgo Prefecture, Japan
- Yoka Lokole, a musical band from Zaire
- Guildfordia yoka, a species of deep-water sea snail

== See also ==
- Yoko (disambiguation)
- Yuka (disambiguation)
