= Yokou =

Yokou can be a misspelling of:

- Youku
- Yoko (disambiguation)
