= Yabu Station =

Railway station in Yabu, Hyōgo Prefecture, Japan

Yabu Station 養父駅
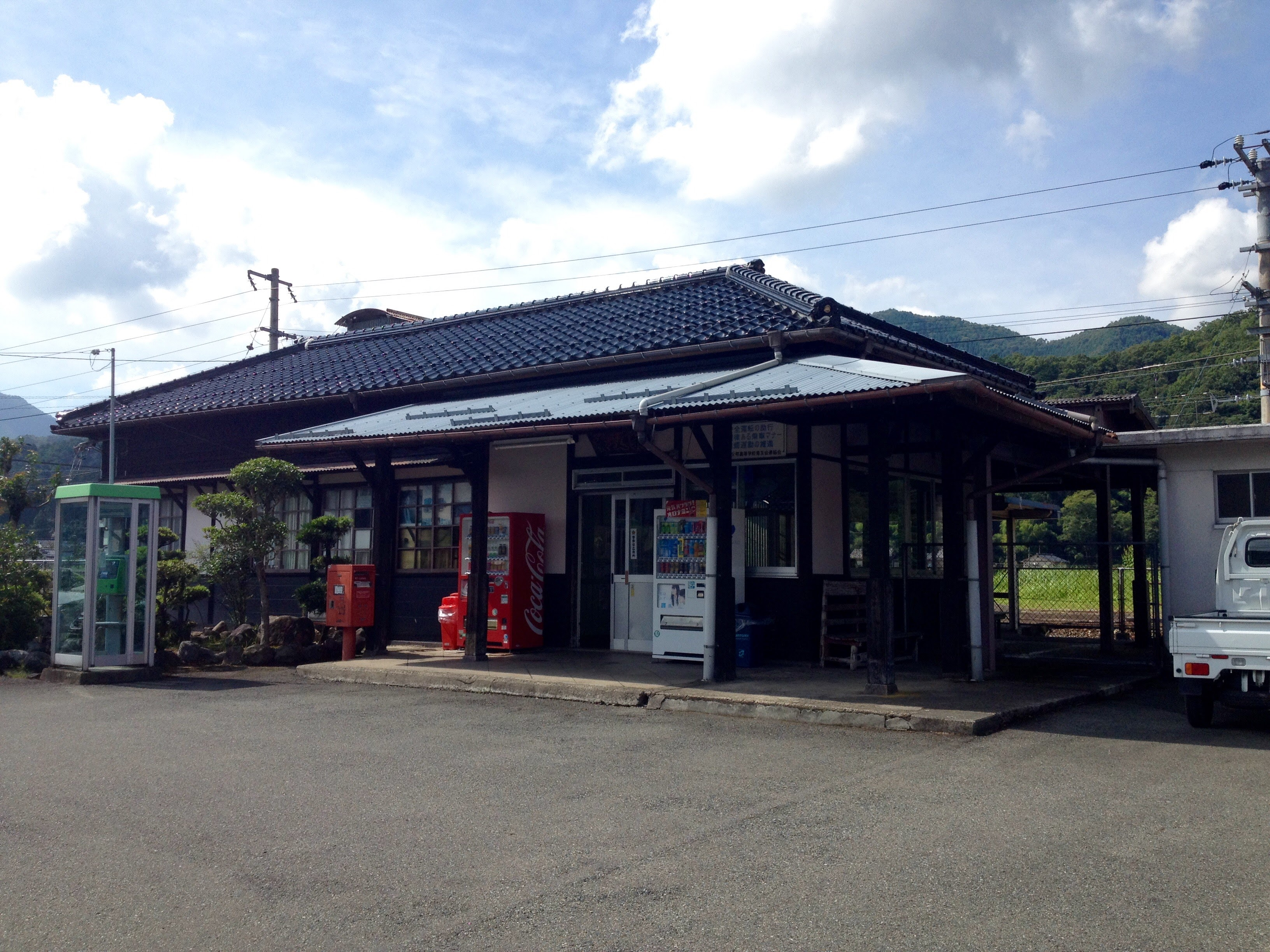
- Yabu Station, September 2017

General information
- Location: Horihata, Yabu-shi, Hyōgo-ken 667-0126; Japan
- Coordinates: 35°22′14″N 134°48′43″E
- Owner: West Japan Railway Company
- Operator: West Japan Railway Company
- Line: San'in Main Line
- Distance: 124.2 km (77.2 miles) from Kyoto
- Platforms: 1 island platform
- Connections: Bus stop

Construction
- Structure type: Ground level

Other information
- Status: Staffed
- Website: Official website

History
- Opened: 10 July 1908

Passengers
- FY 2023: 92 daily
Location
- Location within Hyōgo Prefecture Location within Japan

Yabu Station (養父駅, Yabu-eki) is a passenger railway station located in the city of Yabu, Hyōgo Prefecture, Japan, operated by West Japan Railway Company (JR West).

== Lines ==
Yabu Station is served by the San'in Main Line, and is located 124.2 kilometers from the terminus of the line at Kyoto.

== Station layout ==
The station consists of one ground-level island platform connected to the station building by a footbridge. The station is staffed.

=== Platforms ===
1	■ San'in Main Line	for Kyoto and Osaka
2	■ San'in Main Line	for Toyooka and Kinosaki Onsen

== Adjacent stations ==
«	Service	»
West Japan Railway Company (JR West) Sanin Main Line
Limited Express Hamakaze: Does not stop at this station
Wadayama	Local	Yōka

== History ==
Yabu Station opened on July 1, 1908. With the privatization of the Japan National Railways (JNR) on April 1, 1987, the station came under the aegis of the West Japan Railway Company.

== Passenger statistics ==
In fiscal 2016, the station was used by an average of 76 passengers daily

== Surrounding area ==
- Maruyama River
- Hasamaji Satoyama Park

== See also ==
- List of railway stations in Japan
