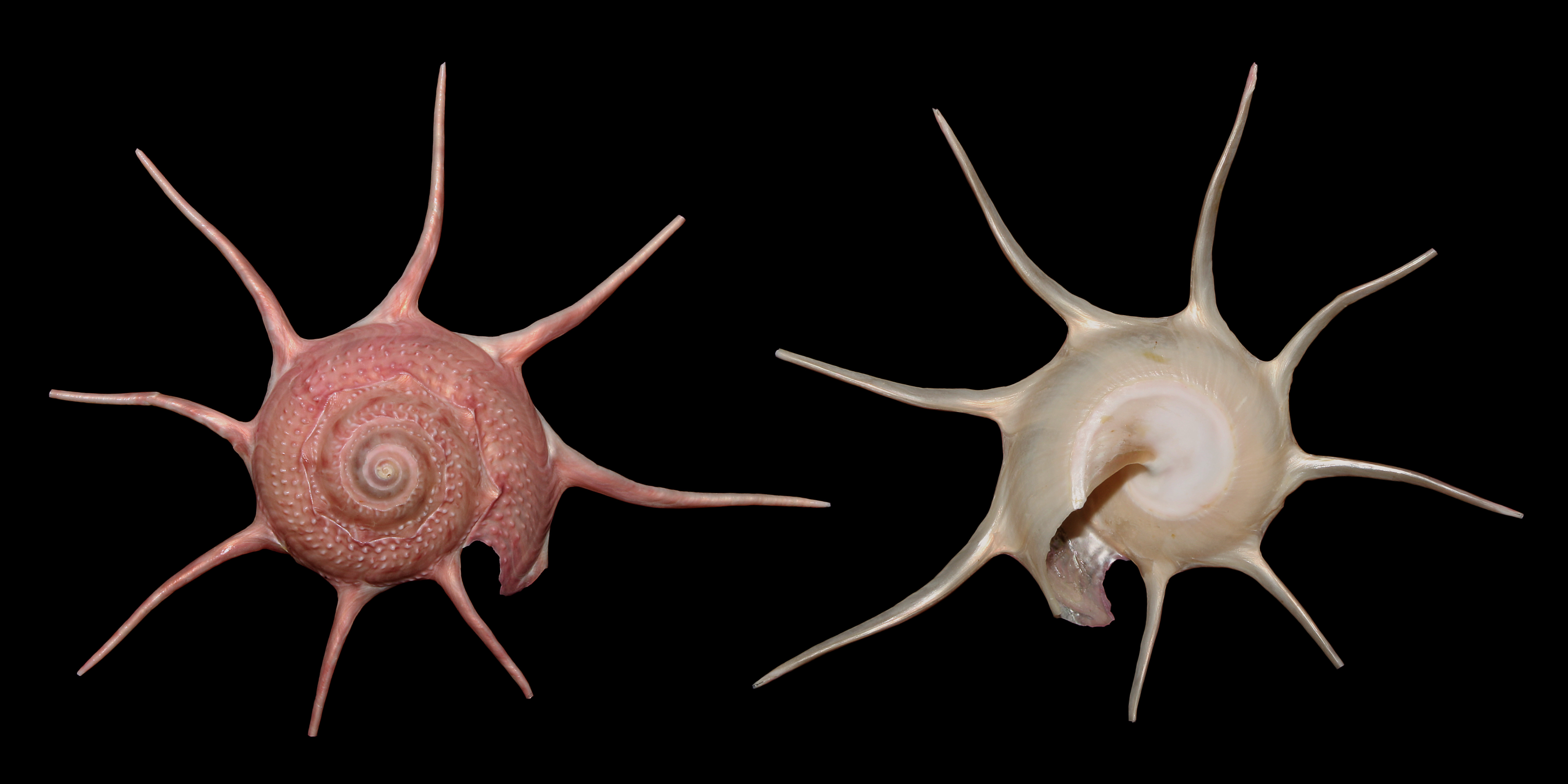
- Two views of a shell of Guildfordia yoka

Scientific classification
- Kingdom: Animalia
- Phylum: Mollusca
- Class: Gastropoda
- Subclass: Vetigastropoda
- Order: Trochida
- Superfamily: Trochoidea
- Family: Turbinidae
- Genus: Guildfordia; Gray, 1850

Type species
- Trochus triumphans Philippi, 1841

Synonyms
- † Fractopella Bell, 1970; † Fractopella megapex Beu, 1970; † Guildfordia (Fractopella) Beu, 1970; † Guildfordia (Opella) Finlay, 1926 · accepted, alternate representation; † Opella Finlay, 1926; † Opella hendersoni Marwick, 1934

= Guildfordia =

Genus of gastropods

Guildfordia is a genus of sea snails, marine gastropod mollusks in the family Turbinidae, the turban snails.

== Description ==
The imperforate shell is wheel-shaped. It is low-conic and granulose above, convex below. The periphery is armed with long slender radiating spines, which are concealed at the sutures. The operculum is flat, with a subobsolete arcuate rib outside. The central tooth of the radula has no cusps.

== Distribution ==
This marine genus occurs off the Philippines, Indo-China, Indo-Malaysia, Papua New Guinea, Eastern Indian Ocean, Oceania, and off Australia (Northern Territory, Queensland, Western Australia).

== Species ==
Species within the genus Guildfordia include:

- Guildfordia aculeata Kosuge, 1979 - Aculeate Star Turban
- † Guildfordia hendersoni (Marwick, 1934)
- † Guildfordia megapex (Beu, 1970)
- † Guildfordia ostarrichi Pacaud, 2017
- Guildfordia radians Dekker, 2008
- † Guildfordia subfimbriata (Suter, 1917)
- Guildfordia superba Poppe, Tagaro & Dekker, 2005 - Superb Star Turban
- Guildfordia triumphans (Philippi, 1841) - Triumphant Star Turban
- Guildfordia yoka Jousseaume, 1899 - Yoka Star Turban

Species brought into synonymy

- Guildfordia delicata Habe & Okutani, 1983: synonym of Guildfordia yoka Jousseaume, 1888
- Guildfordia gloriosa Kuroda & Habe in Kira, 1961: synonym of Bolma henica (Watson, 1885)
- Guildfordia heliophorus Gray: synonym of Astraea heliotropium (Martyn, 1784)
- Guildfordia kurzi Petuch, 1980 - Kurz's Star Turban: synonym of Guildfordia aculeata Kosuge, 1979
- Guildfordia tagaroae Alf & Kreipl, 2006: synonym of Guildfordia aculeata Kosuge, 1979

Taxon inquirendum

- Guildfordia monilifera (Hedley & Willey, 1896) (possibly a synonym of Guildfordia aculeata)
