= Handsome Western States =

Studio album by Beulah
- Released: 1997
- Recorded: January 1996 – April 1997
- Genre: Indie rock
- Length: 33:35
- Label: Elephant Six
- Producer: Jeff Byrd

Beulah chronology
A Small Cattle Drive in a Snow Storm (1997)	Handsome Western States (1997)	When Your Heartstrings Break (1999)

Professional ratings
Review scores
Source	Rating
AllMusic	3/5 stars
Pitchfork Media	8.5/10
Stylus Magazine	B−
Tiny Mix Tapes	3.5/5 stars
Uncut	3/5 stars

Handsome Western States is indie rock band Beulah's debut album, released in 1997. The sound is much less polished and elaborate than later albums. The album went out of print in 1999 but was re-pressed with new artwork in 2002. The album was never released in Europe, however. Because of this, many of the band's European singles were pressed with songs from Handsome Western States as B-sides.

== Track listing ==
All songs written by Miles Kurosky, except where noted.

1. "Maroon Bible" – 3:23 (Cotton Seiler)
2. "Lay Low for the Letdown" – 3:32
3. "Disco: The Secretaries Blues" – 3:25
4. "The Rise and Fall or Our Hero's Reward" – 2:36
5. "I Love John, She Loves Paul" – 3:02
6. "Slo-Mo for the Masses" – 1:39
7. "I've Been Broken (I've Been Fixed)" – 2:25
8. "Queen of the Populists" – 2:24
9. "Shotgun Dedication" – 2:39
10. "Rust with Me" – 1:35
11. "Delta" – 4:17
12. "Dig the Subatomic Holdout #2" – 2:38

Japan Edition Bonus Tracks:

13. "When I Get to California" – 3:44
14. "Alpha Incipiens" – 1:55 (John Darnielle)
