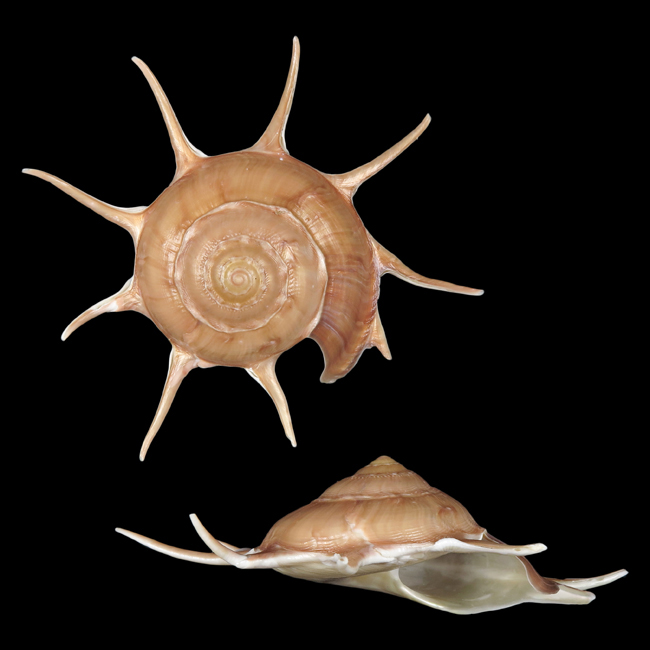

Scientific classification
- Kingdom: Animalia
- Phylum: Mollusca
- Class: Gastropoda
- Subclass: Vetigastropoda
- Order: Trochida
- Family: Turbinidae
- Genus: Guildfordia
- Species: G. superba

Binomial name
- Guildfordia superba Poppe, Tagaro & Dekker, 2005

= Guildfordia superba =

Species of gastropod

Guildfordia superba, common name the superb star turban, is a species of sea snail, a marine gastropod mollusk in the family Turbinidae, the turban snails.

== Description ==
The width of the shell, including spines, can vary from 75mm to 90mm, while the diameter with spines is approximately 40mm. The height of the shell is approximately 21.8-23.5mm. G. superba has a low, conical spire. The overall shape is turbinate, as is implied by the family name Turbinidae. The umbilicus is wide, and the anterior surface of the shell is white to opalescent and glossy, with a tan colored spiral band following the body whorl. The posterior surface of the shell is also glossy but is tan to brown, with radiating axial bands of darker or more golden brown decorating the whorls. G. superba displays characteristic spines radiating from the anterior edge of the body whorl. The aperture is oblong, and the posterior lip extends beyond the anterior side of the lip.

== Distribution and Habitat ==
This marine benthic species occurs in and is endemic to the coasts of the Balut Island, Philippines. It is found in waters between 100-200 meters below the surface.

== Life Habits ==
=== Diet ===
Species in the family Turbinidae are herbivorous grazers.

=== Reproduction ===
Member species of the subclass Vetigastropoda are gonochoric and broadcast spawners.

=== Locomotion ===
G. superba moves by mucus mediated gliding.
