= Beulah (band) =

American indie rock band

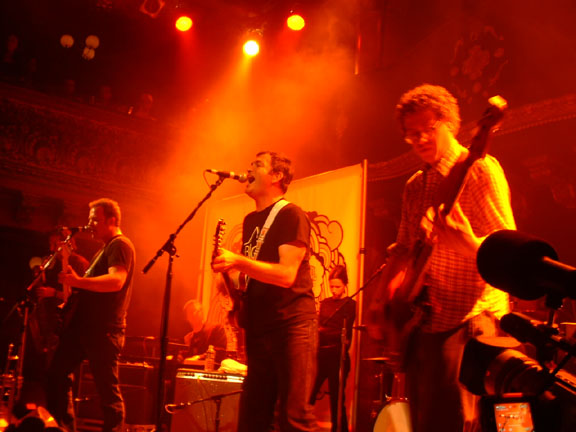
- Beulah performing in 2003

Background information
- Origin: San Francisco, California, United States
- Genre: Indie rock
- Years active: 1996–2004, 2009
- Labels: Elephant Six, Velocette, Sugar Free
- Past members: Miles Kurosky; Bill Swan; Pat Noel; Danny Sullivan; Eli Crews; Pat Abernathy; Steve La Follette; Steve St. Cin; Bill Evans

Beulah was an American indie rock band from San Francisco, California, often associated with The Elephant 6 Recording Company. The band would go on to gain ample critical acclaim from many well respected outlets including Rolling Stone and The Guardian.

== History ==
=== Early years (1996–1998) ===
The band was formed by Miles Kurosky and Bill Swan in San Francisco in 1996, while the pair were working in the same office. They discovered that they shared similar musical tastes and, disregarding some mutual dislike, decided to form a band. This early incarnation of Beulah recorded a song every six weeks for 16 months on their four-track recorder. The band received attention from The Apples in Stereo frontman and Elephant 6 member Robert Schneider, who expressed interest on releasing what was to be its first single, A Small Cattle Drive in a Snow Storm, on Elephant 6 Records. Their first album, Handsome Western States, was released in the same year, also on Elephant 6 and mastered by Schneider. The record soon sold out. This association with the collective has continued throughout their career, despite the fact that Beulah did not release anything more on the label. In order to tour in support of the album, Steve La Follette, Steve St. Cin and Pat Noel joined the band, with the band playing its first shows in support of the Apples.

=== Middle years (1999–2002) ===
Their second album, When Your Heartstrings Break, followed two years later to critical acclaim. The sound of the band had changed — as Kurosky put it, the band's production values had shifted "from lo-fi to mid-fi", and it incorporated several dozen instruments, using eighteen additional musicians — strings and horns were heavily incorporated, along with more exotic instrumentation. Also at this time, the band added keyboardist Bill Evans to its line-up. Shifty Disco Records, an Oxford, U.K.,-based label, also released two U.K.-only singles in 1999, Sunday Under Glass and Score From Augusta, with Emma Blowgun's Last Stand released the following year. These singles featured b-sides culled from Handsome Western States, which remained unreleased in the U.K. and had fallen out of print in the U.S., until 2000 further copies were made available by the band in 1999, with different artwork. Emma Blowgun's Last Stand was also released in Australia by Elastic Records, with two exclusive bonus tracks.

In 2000, Beulah had a music practice space at the Art Explosion Studios at 2425-17th Street in the Mission District; other bands in this space included Deerhoof, Creeper Lagoon, Zmrzlina, Don't Mean Maybe, and S-- S-- Band Band.

The band continued to tour extensively throughout 1999, taking a break in 2000. Steve St. Cin left the band after this and was replaced by Danny Sullivan, best known from his days in Screeching Weasel. Kurosky went to Japan, staying with a friend for eight weeks, and wrote the songs that would eventually turn into Beulah's third album. He mailed demo tapes of the songs to each band member, who mailed back their own versions of, and additions to, the songs. This process created interesting juxtapositions in the band's songwriting process, as Kurosky described: "Bill might have heard it as a soul song and Pat might have heard it as a country song — and I might happen to like both parts, and use them both". Kurosky turned these recordings into the basis of the band's new record, The Coast Is Never Clear. During the recording process, however, Kurosky was diagnosed with bipolar disorder, and took daily therapy sessions, which informed the lyrical mood of the record, which was often incredibly downbeat, very much at odds with the breezy, summery feel of the music. This also made the recording of the record difficult — Bill Swan's studio diary often contains excerpts such as, "Miles threatened to hit me over the head with a mic stand. This is going to be a long record". To add to these personal problems, Beulah also encountered other problems with the release of the record, primarily the buy-out of Capricorn Records, which had signed Beulah after When Your Heartstrings Break was released. In the end, the record was released on newly founded independent label Velocette Records on Sept. 11, 2001. The record gained a great degree of critical acclaim, and the band continued to tour, despite having to cancel its European dates that winter. Shortly after the release of the record, Steve La Follette and Bill Evans left the band and were replaced by Eli Crews and Pat Abernathy.

=== Later years (2002–2004) ===
2002 saw the then-out-of-print Handsome Western States repressed for the third time, along with another U.S. tour, after which the band settled into rehearsing material for its next album. The period surrounding Yoko's conception and recording was one of great personal strife for the band: Kurosky separated from his longtime girlfriend, and three of the six band members went through divorce. Amid this, the foundations of the band appeared to be shaking; rumors of a break-up were rife. The mood of the album was much darker and the band phased back much of its instrumentation, preferring to create more of a live sound than layering multiple overdubs atop the mix. The album took a much rockier direction than previous releases; upon its release in 2003, it attracted a similar lauding that had greeted their previous two records. An album of demos, appropriately titled Yoko Demo, was released in December.

At this time, Beulah appeared to be falling apart. Cryptic messages alluding to a break-up appeared on the band's website, and the band itself stated that, if Yoko did not achieve gold status, its members would split. Though it received the best reviews of the band's career, scoring Universal Acclaim on Metacritic and being described as a "career-spanning epic" by Dusted Magazine, the record failed to achieve gold status. After one final tour, the band split up, ending with a free concert at New York's Battery Park at Castle Clinton on August 5, 2004. On August 2, 2005, a DVD chronicling their fall 2003 tour, titled A Good Band is Easy to Kill (referring to the band's song "A Good Man is Easy to Kill") was released.

In 2005, all four Beulah albums, as well as the single "My Horoscope Said It Would Be a Bad Year," were released on iTunes after fans suggested they be easily accessible.

=== Miles Kurosky's Desert of Shallow Effects ===
Miles Kurosky released his first solo album, The Desert of Shallow Effects, on March 9, 2010, via Majordomo Records, an imprint of Shout! Factory. Produced by Kurosky and engineered by former Beulah member Eli Crews (Deerhoof, Why?), The Desert of Shallow Effects includes a cast of more than two dozen musicians (among them several former Beulah members) playing a vast array of instruments. “When I wrote lyrics before, for Beulah, they were of an esoteric nature, but this time, I wanted them to read like stories,” Kurosky said.

In late 2009, the members of Beulah reunited to perform selections from The Desert of Shallow Effects for The Bay Bridged festival.

The 2009 film Youth in Revolt contained the Beulah song "Popular Mechanics for Lovers," and it also appears on the film's soundtrack album.

== Members ==
- Miles Kurosky – lead vocals, guitar
- Bill Swan – trumpet, guitar, vocals
- Pat Noel – guitar, keyboards
- Steve St. Cin – drums (1996–2000)
- Steve La Follette – bass, vocals (1996–2001)
- Bill Evans – keyboards (1999–2001)
- Danny Sullivan – drums (2000–04)
- Pat Abernathy – keyboards (2001–04)
- Eli Crews – bass, vocals (2001–04)

== Discography ==
=== Studio albums ===
- Handsome Western States (Elephant 6; CD; 1997)
- When Your Heartstrings Break (Sugar Free Records; CD; 1999)
- The Coast Is Never Clear (Velocette Records; CD; 2001)
- Yoko (Velocette Records; CD; 2003)

=== Demo album ===
- Yoko Demo (Velocette Records; CD; 2003)

=== Singles ===
- A Small Cattle Drive in a Snow Storm (Elephant 6; 7 inch; 1997)
- Sunday Under Glass (Shifty Disco Records; CD; 1999)
- Score From Augusta (Shifty Disco Records; CD; 1999)
- Emma Blowgun's Last Stand (Shifty Disco Records; CD; 2000)
- Emma Blowgun's Last Stand (Elastic Records; CD; 2000)
- Popular Mechanics For Lovers (Shifty Disco Records; CD; 2001)
