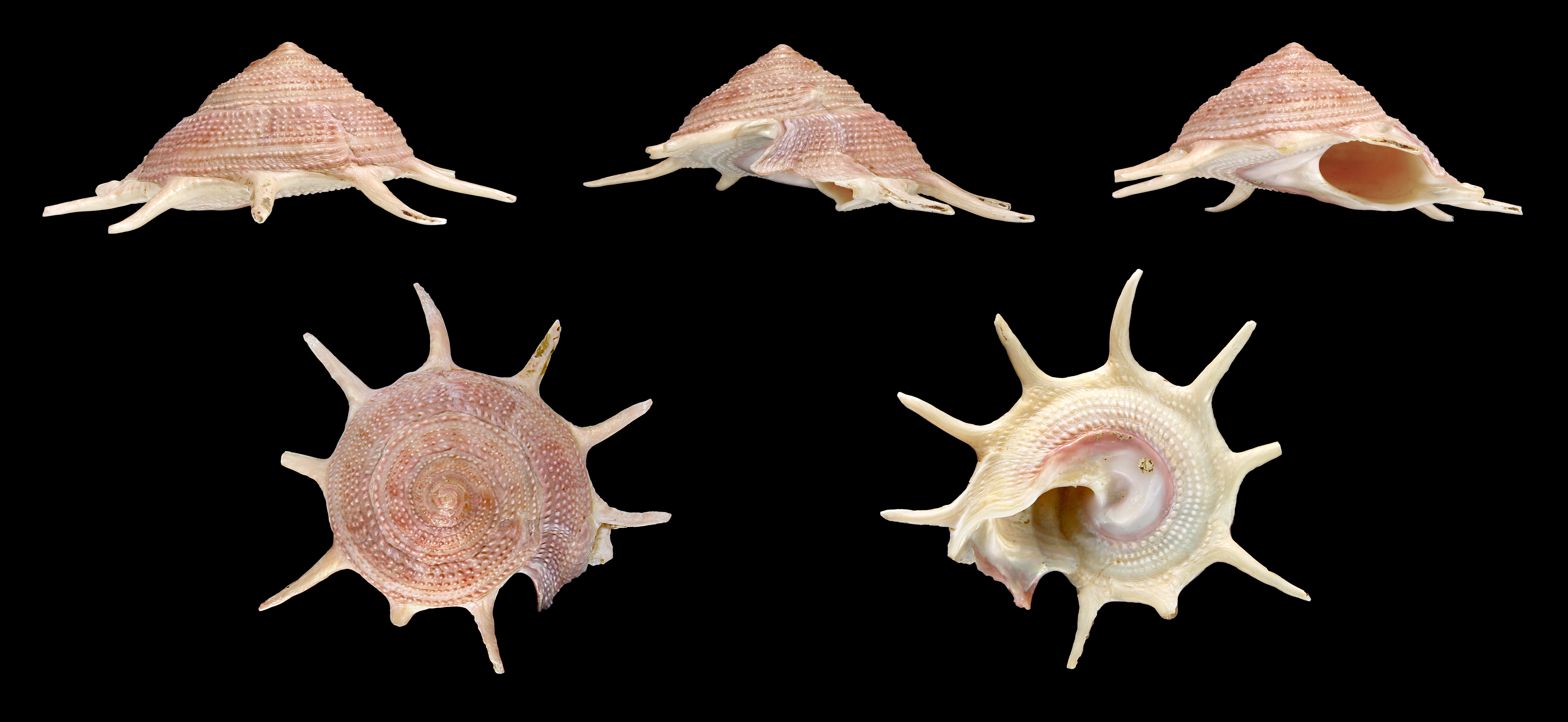
- Five views of a shell of Guildfordia triumphans (Philippi, 1841) from Japan

Scientific classification
- Kingdom: Animalia
- Phylum: Mollusca
- Class: Gastropoda
- Subclass: Vetigastropoda
- Order: Trochida
- Family: Turbinidae
- Genus: Guildfordia
- Species: G. triumphans

Binomial name
- Guildfordia triumphans (Philippi, 1841)

Synonyms
- Astralium (Guildfordia) triumphans (Philippi, 1841); Trochus guildfordia Reeve, 1842; Turbo triumphans Philippi, 1841 (original description)

= Guildfordia triumphans =

Species of gastropod

Guildfordia triumphans, common name the triumphant star turban, is a species of sea snail, a marine gastropod mollusk in the family Turbinidae, the turban snails. It was discovered by R. A. Philippi in 1841.

== Description ==
The size of the shell varies between 35 mm and 60 mm. The imperforate shell has a low-conic shape. Its color pattern is, metallic brownish-purple above, nearly white below. The six whorls are slightly convex above. The body whorl is armed around the carinate periphery with long slender closed tubular radiating spines, about eight in number on the body-whorl, and which are reabsorbed as the growth advances leaving only short stumps to festoon the sutures. The upper surface shows a close revolving series – generally eight to ten on the body whorl – of minute laterally compressed granules. The base of the shell is slightly convex, usually with a marginal row of granules, and several rows surrounding the central callus. The aperture is transversely ovate, angulate and channelled at peripheral carina, iridescent within. The peristome is sinuous above. The umbilical region is covered with a heavy callus, more or less stained with pinkish, somewhat excavated at center, and obsoletely spirally ridged.

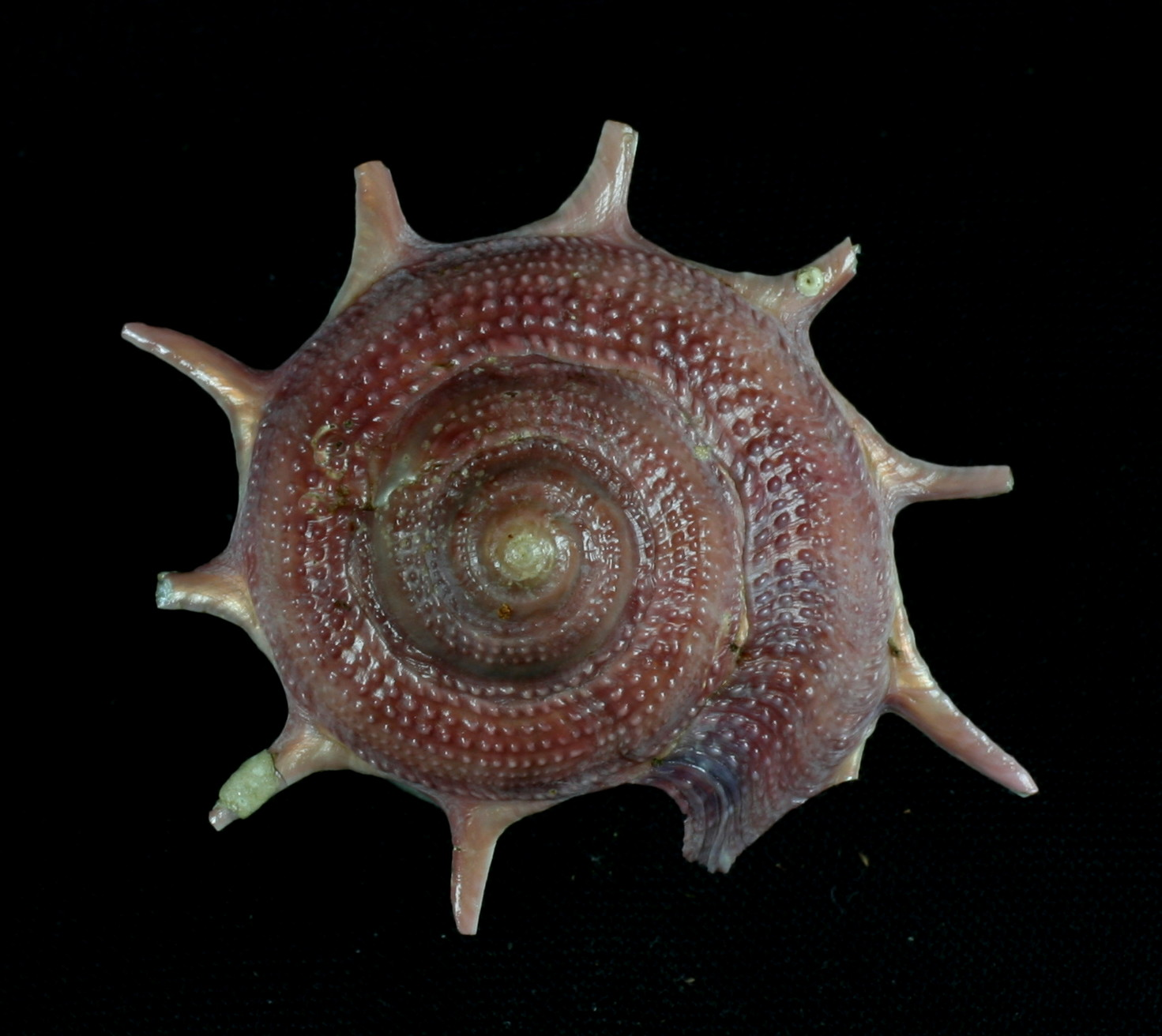
Shell of Guildfordia triumphans (Philippi, 1841), (rare 10 spined form) measuring 38.1 mm diameter, taken by gill nets at 30–50 fathoms off Minabe, in Japan.

== Distribution ==
This marine species occurs off the Philippines, Indo-China, Indo-Malaysia, Japan and Australia (Northern Territory, Queensland).
