= Guildfordia ostarrichi =

Scientific classification
- Kingdom: Animalia
- Phylum: Mollusca
- Class: Gastropoda
- Subclass: Vetigastropoda
- Order: Trochida
- Superfamily: Trochoidea
- Family: Turbinidae
- Genus: Guildfordia
- Species: †G. ostarrichi

Binomial name
- †Guildfordia ostarrichi Pacaud, 2017

Synonyms
- Delphinula spinosa Zekeli, 1852

Extinct species of gastropod

Guildfordia ostarrichi is an extinct species of sea snail, a marine gastropod mollusk, in the family Turbinidae, the turban snails.
