= The Coast Is Never Clear =

Studio album by Beulah
- Released: September 11, 2001
- Recorded: 2000
- Genres: Indie pop; orchestral pop; power pop
- Length: 40:37
- Label: Velocette Records
- Producer: Miles Kurosky

Beulah chronology
Emma Blowgun's Last Stand (2000)	The Coast Is Never Clear (2001)	Yoko (2003)

Professional ratings
Review scores
Source	Rating
AllMusic	4.5/5 stars
The A.V. Club	(favorable)
Drowned in Sound	(9/10)
NPR	(favorable)
Pitchfork	(6.6/10)
Rolling Stone	3/5 stars
Tiny Mix Tapes	4/5 stars

The Coast Is Never Clear is the third album released by indie rock band Beulah in 2001. Originally planned for release on Capricorn Records, the label was folded into Island Def Jam Records along with many of its artists including 311. However, Beulah, The Glands, Jucifer, and The Honeyrods were not sold along with the other properties of the label. Former employees of Capricorn formed Velocette in order to release albums by the displaced bands, forcing the release date to be pushed back until September 11, 2001.

== Track listing ==
(all songs written by Miles Kurosky, except where noted)

1. "Hello Resolven" – 1:49
2. "A Good Man Is Easy to Kill" – 4:20
3. "What Will You Do When Your Suntan Fades" – 4:05
4. "Gene Autry" – 3:35
5. "Silver Lining" – 2:35
6. "Popular Mechanics for Lovers" – 3:04
7. "Gravity's Bringing Us Down" (Kurosky/Noel) – 4:39
8. "Hey Brother" – 3:28
9. "I'll Be Your Lampshade" – 4:12
10. "Cruel Minor Change" – 2:26
11. "Burned By the Sun" (Noel) – 2:47
12. "Night Is the Day Turned Inside Out" (Kurosky/LaFollette) – 4:12

Note: ^ denotes that the song was released as a single.

== Trivia ==
- The song "Popular Mechanics for Lovers" mentions 69 Love Songs by The Magnetic Fields.
- The same track was used in the soundtrack for 2010 film Youth in Revolt.
