= When Your Heartstrings Break =

Studio album by Beulah
- Released: March 9, 1999
- Recorded: May – September 1998
- Genre: Orchestral pop
- Length: 34:19
- Label: Sugar Free Records
- Producers: Bill Swan; Steve LaFollette

Beulah chronology
Handsome Western States (1997)	When Your Heartstrings Break (1999)	Emma Blowgun's Last Stand (2000)

Professional ratings
Review scores
Source	Rating
AllMusic	4.5/5 stars
Pitchfork	(8.3/10)
Rolling Stone	3/5 stars
Sputnikmusic	4.5/5 stars

When Your Heartstrings Break is the second studio album by San Francisco indie rock band Beulah. It was released on March 9, 1999 on the Sugar Free Records label. The album went out of print several years afterwards and did not see a reprinting until 2003. When Your Heartstrings Break is one of the two records that Beulah personally owns the rights to, the other being Handsome Western States. The album was released in Japan, Europe and Australia, with each release bearing album art different from the US release.

== Track listing ==
All songs written by Miles Kurosky, except where noted.

1. "Score from Augusta" – 2:54
2. "Sunday Under Glass" (Kurosky/LaFollette) – 2:54
3. "Matter vs. Space" – 3:00
4. "Emma Blowgun's Last Stand" – 5:21
5. "Calm Go the Wild Seas" – 3:01
6. "Ballad of the Lonely Argonaut" – 2:29
7. "Comrade's Twenty Sixth" – 1:53
8. "The Aristocratic Swells" – 2:55
9. "Silverado Days" – 3:39
10. "Warmer" – 2:56
11. "If We Can Land a Man on the Moon, Surely I Can Win Your Heart" (a.k.a. IWCLAMOTMSICWYH) – 3:17

=== Singles ===
The songs "Sunday Under Glass", "Score from Augusta" and "Emma Blowgun's Last Stand" were released as singles in the United Kingdom on the Shifty Disco label. The song "Emma Blowgun's Last Stand" was released as an EP in Australia on the Elastic Records label. "If We Can Land a Man on the Moon, Surely I Can Win Your Heart" was featured in the 2009 soundtrack to the graphic novel Scott Pilgrim vs. the Universe.
