= Guildfordia hendersoni =

Scientific classification
- Kingdom: Animalia
- Phylum: Mollusca
- Class: Gastropoda
- Subclass: Vetigastropoda
- Order: Trochida
- Superfamily: Trochoidea
- Family: Turbinidae
- Genus: Guildfordia
- Species: †G. hendersoni

Binomial name
- †Guildfordia hendersoni (Marwick, 1934)

Synonyms
- Guildfordia (Opella) hendersoni (Marwick, 1934)

Extinct species of sea snail

Guildfordia hendersoni is an extinct species of sea snail, a marine gastropod mollusk, in the family Turbinidae, the turban snails.
