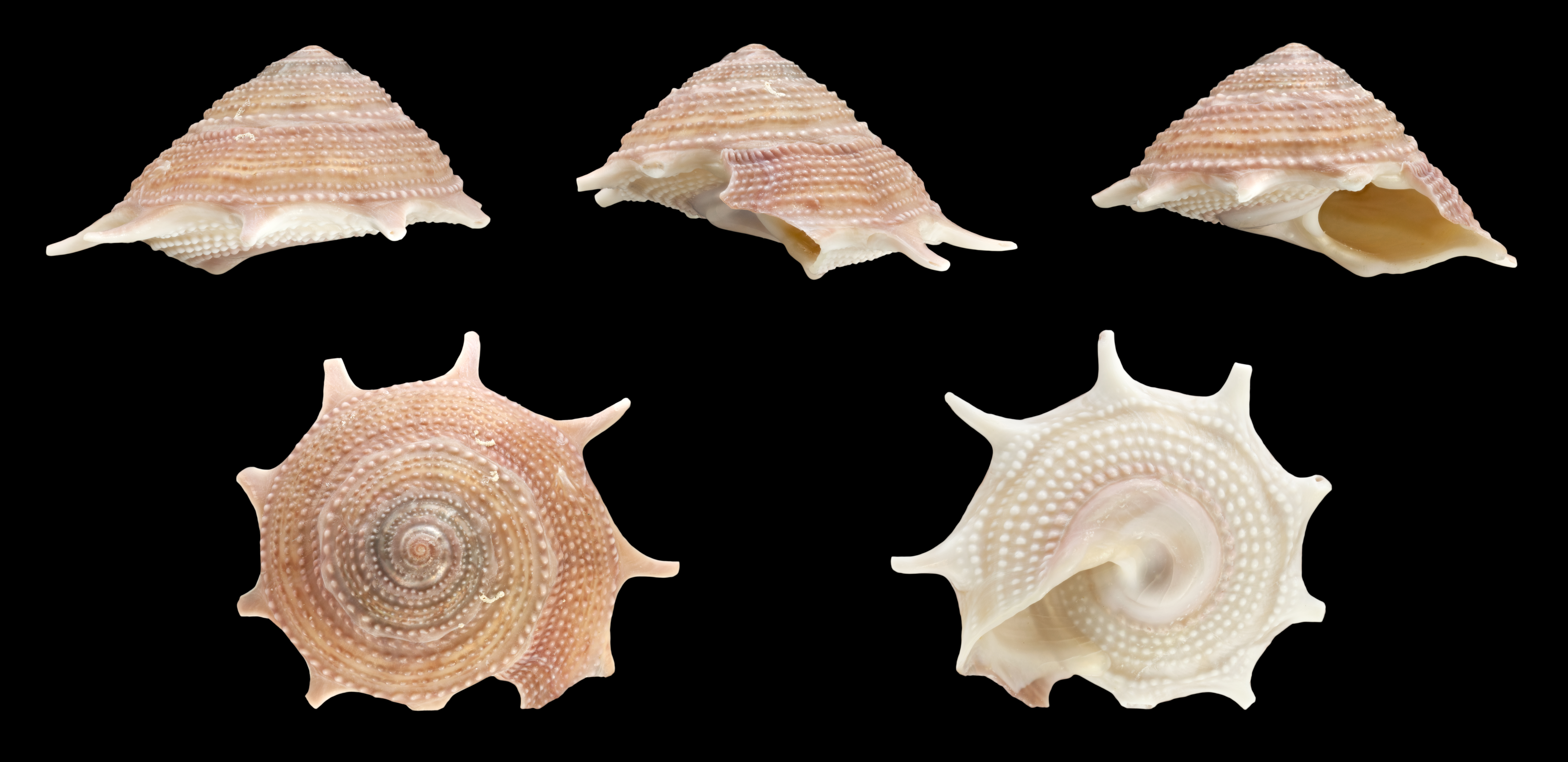
- A shell of Guildfordia aculeata

Scientific classification
- Kingdom: Animalia
- Phylum: Mollusca
- Class: Gastropoda
- Subclass: Vetigastropoda
- Order: Trochida
- Family: Turbinidae
- Genus: Guildfordia
- Species: G. aculeata

Binomial name
- Guildfordia aculeata Kosuge, 1979

Synonyms
- Guildfordia kurzi Petuch, 1979; Guildfordia tagaroae Alf & Kreipl, 2006

= Guildfordia aculeata =

Species of gastropod

Guildfordia aculeata, common name the aculeate star turban, is a species of sea snail, a marine gastropod mollusk in the family Turbinidae, the turban snails.

== Description ==
The size of the shell varies between 35 mm and 60 mm.

== Distribution ==
This marine species occurs off the Philippines.
