= Guildfordia megapex =

Scientific classification
- Kingdom: Animalia
- Phylum: Mollusca
- Class: Gastropoda
- Subclass: Vetigastropoda
- Order: Trochida
- Superfamily: Trochoidea
- Family: Turbinidae
- Genus: Guildfordia
- Species: †G. megapex

Binomial name
- †Guildfordia megapex (Beu, 1970)

Synonyms
- Guildfordia (Fractopella) megapex (Beu, 1970)

Extinct species of gastropod

Guildfordia megapex is an extinct species of sea snail, a marine gastropod mollusk, in the family Turbinidae, the turban snails.
