= Guildfordia radians =

Scientific classification
- Kingdom: Animalia
- Phylum: Mollusca
- Class: Gastropoda
- Subclass: Vetigastropoda
- Order: Trochida
- Family: Turbinidae
- Genus: Guildfordia
- Species: G. radians

Binomial name
- Guildfordia radians Dekker, 2008

Species of gastropod

Guildfordia radians is a species of sea snail, a marine gastropod mollusk in the family Turbinidae, the turban snails.

== Distribution ==
This marine species occurs off Papua New Guinea and Western Australia.
