= Yabu =

Yabu 養父市
- City
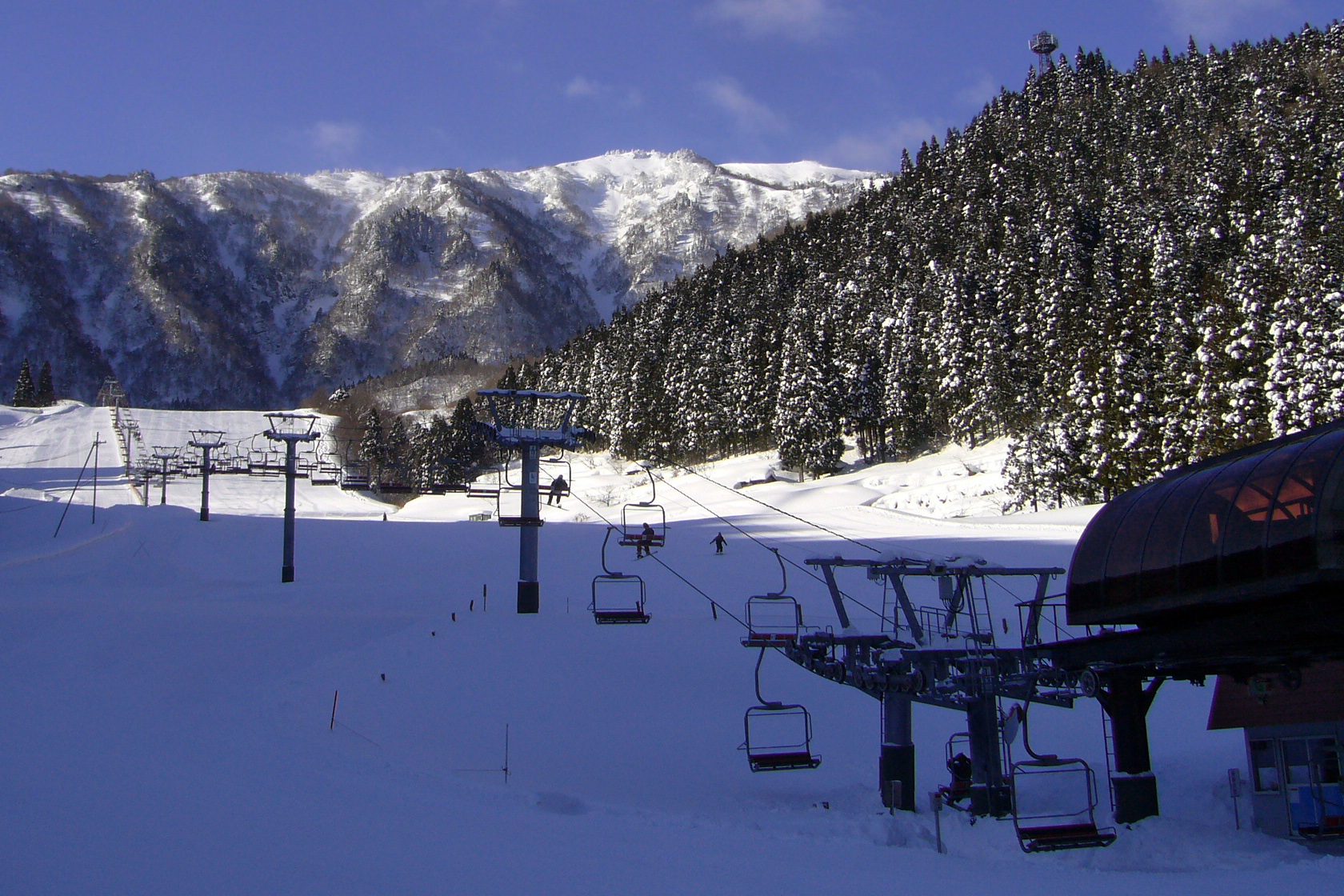
- Mount Hyonosen and Hyonosen International Ski Resort

- Flag Chapter

- Location of Yabu in Hyōgo Prefecture

- Location in Japan
- Coordinates: 35°24′N 134°46′E
- Country: Japan
- Region: Kansai
- Prefecture: Hyōgo
- First official recorded: late 5th century AD (official)
- Yőka town settled: February 1, 1955
- Yabu town settled: September 30, 1956
- Current city merged: April 1, 2004

Government
  - Mayor: Kenichi Őbayashi (大林賢一) - from November 2024

Area
  - Total: 422.91 km^{2} (163.29 sq mi)

Population (March 31, 2022)
  - Total: 22,177
  - Density: 52.439/km^{2} (135.82/sq mi)
- Time zone: UTC+09:00 (JST)
- City hall address: 1675, Yoka, Yoka-chō, Yabu-shi, Hyōgo-ken 667-8651
- Website: Official website
- Symbols
- Flower: Lysichiton camtschatcensis
- Tree: Fagus crenata

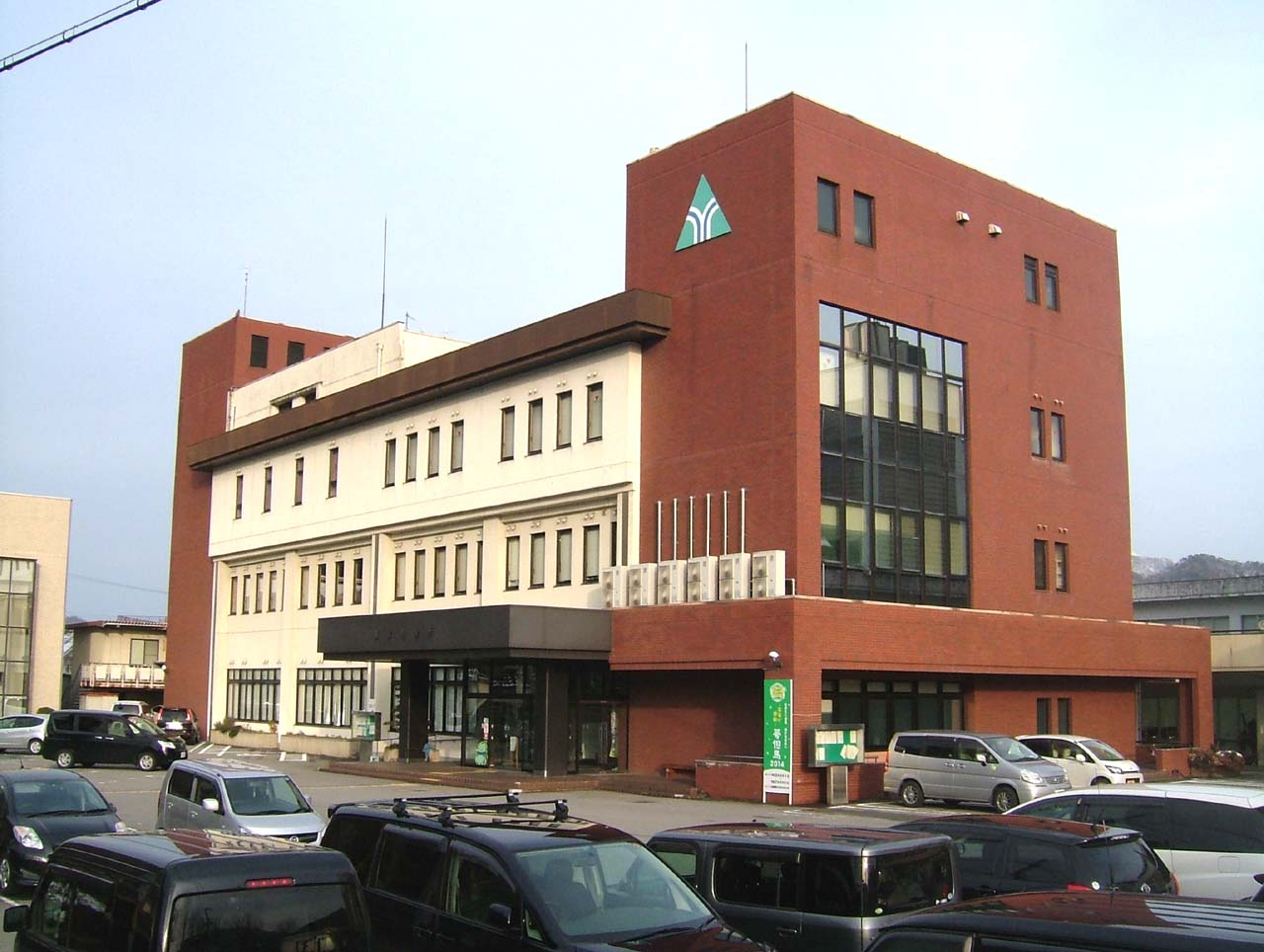
Yabu City Hall

Yabu (養父市, Yabu-shi) is a city located in Hyōgo Prefecture, Japan. As of 31 March 2022, the city had an estimated population of 22,177 in 9236 households and a population density of 52 persons per km^{2}. The total area of the city is 422.91 square kilometres (163.29 sq mi).

== Geography ==
Yabu is located in the northern part of Hyōgo Prefecture and the Kinki region.The Maruyama River flows from the southeast to the northeast in the eastern part of the city, and the Yoka and Sekinomiya neighborhoods are located along the Yagi River, which is a tributary of the Maruyama River, and the Yabu and Oya areas are located along the Oya River. Part of the city is within the borders of the Hyōnosen-Ushiroyama-Nagisan Quasi-National Park, including Mount Myōken (1139 meters), and Mount Hyōno the city's highest elevation at 1510 meters.

=== Neighbouring municipalities ===
Hyōgo Prefecture

- Asago
- Kami
- Shisō
- Toyooka

Tottori Prefecture

- Wakasa

=== Climate ===
Yabu has a humid subtropical climate (Köppen Cfa) characterized by warm summers and cool winters with heavy snowfall. The average annual temperature in Yabu is 12.6 °C. The average annual rainfall is 1936 mm with September as the wettest month. The temperatures are highest on average in August, at around 24.2 °C, and lowest in January, at around 0.3 °C.

== Demographics ==
Per Japanese census data, the population of Yabu has declined steadily over the half century.

Historical population
Year	Pop.	±%
1960	44,884	—
1970	36,716	−18.2%
1980	33,979	−7.5%
1990	31,092	−8.5%
2000	30,110	−3.2%
2010	26,509	−12.0%

== History ==
The area of the modern town of Yabu was within ancient Tajima Province. In the Edo Period, it was mostly tenryō territory under direct administration of the Tokugawa shogunate, with a small portion under the control of Izushi Domain. Following the Meiji restoration, it was initially part of "Toyooka Domain" before merging with Hyōgo Prefecture in 1876. The village of Hirotani and Takinoya created within Yabu District, Hyōgo with the creation of the modern municipalities system on April 1, 1889. Hirotani was raised to town status on April 15, 1927 and merged with Takinoya to form the town of Myōjin on September 1, 1956. Myōjin changed its name to Yabu on March 31, 1957. On April 1, 2004, Yabu, merged with the towns of Oya, Sekinomiya and Yoka (all from Yabu District) to form the city of Yabu.

== Government ==
Yabu has a mayor-council form of government with a directly elected mayor and a unicameral city council of 16 members. Yabu, together with the city of Asago contributes one member to the Hyogo Prefectural Assembly. In terms of national politics, the city is part of Hyōgo 5th district of the lower house of the Diet of Japan.

== Economy ==
Yabu has an economy based primarily on agriculture, and is known for its production of garlic and "Tajima beef".

== Education ==
Yabu has eight public elementary schools and three public middle schools operated by the city government and two public high schools operated by the Hyōgo Prefectural Department of Education. There is also one private high school.

== Transportation ==
=== Railway ===
JR West – San'in Main Line

- Yabu - Yōka

=== Highway ===
- National Route 9
- National Route 312
- National Route 483

== Sister cities ==
- Rusutsu, Hokkaido, Japan

== Local attractions ==
- Miidani Kofun Cluster, National Historic Site
- Yagi Castle ruins, National Historic Site
