= Yagi Castle =

Japanese Kamakura-period castle

- 八木城
- Yabu, Hyōgo, Japan
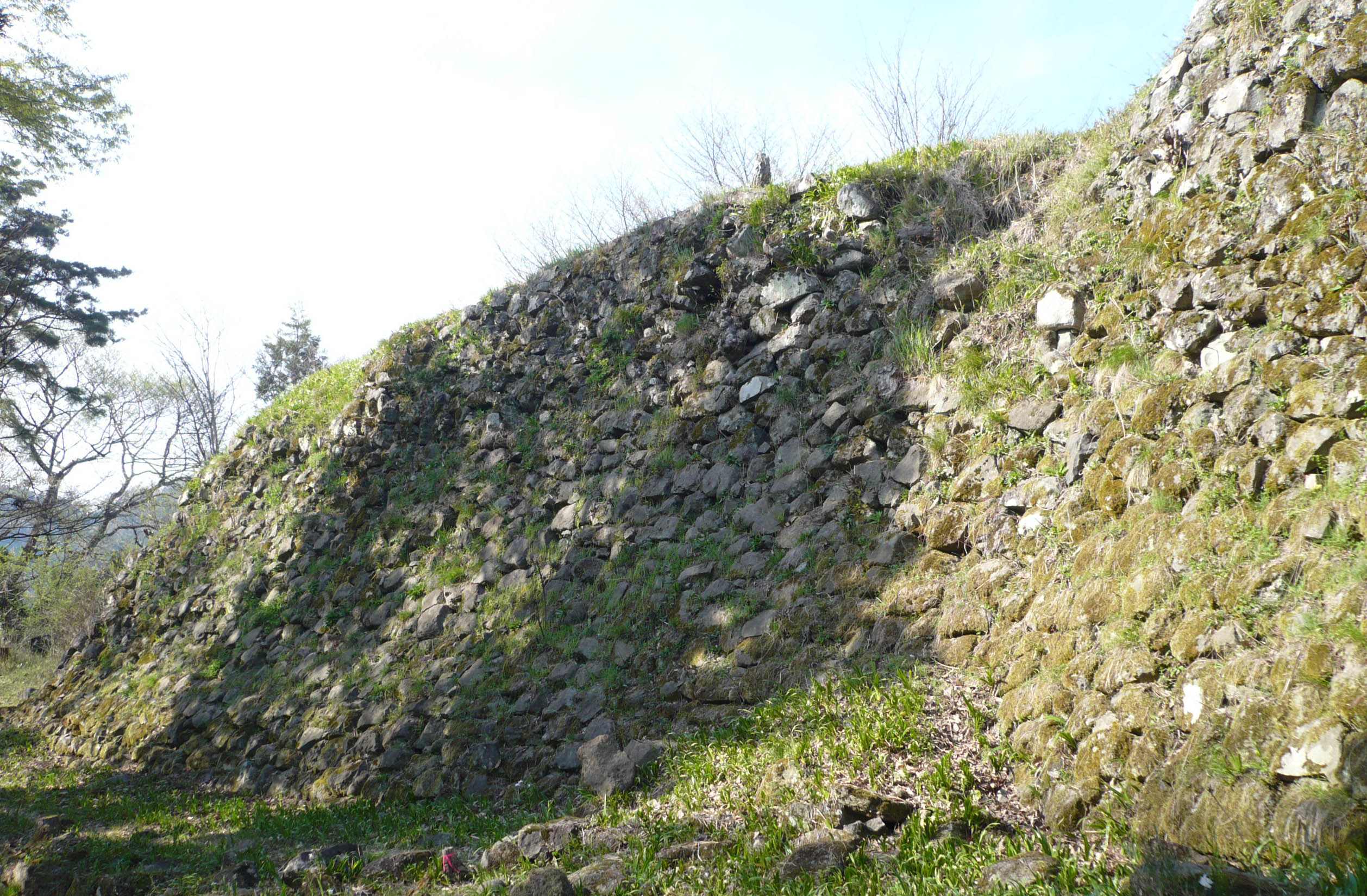
- Inner Bailey wall of Yagi Castle

Site information
- Type: Yamajiro-style Japanese castle
- Condition: ruins

Location
- Yagi Castle Yagi Castle (Japan)
- Coordinates: 35°23′15.01″N 134°42′42.53″E

Site history
- Built: c.1063
- In use: 1628
- Materials: Wood, stone
- National Historic Site of Japan

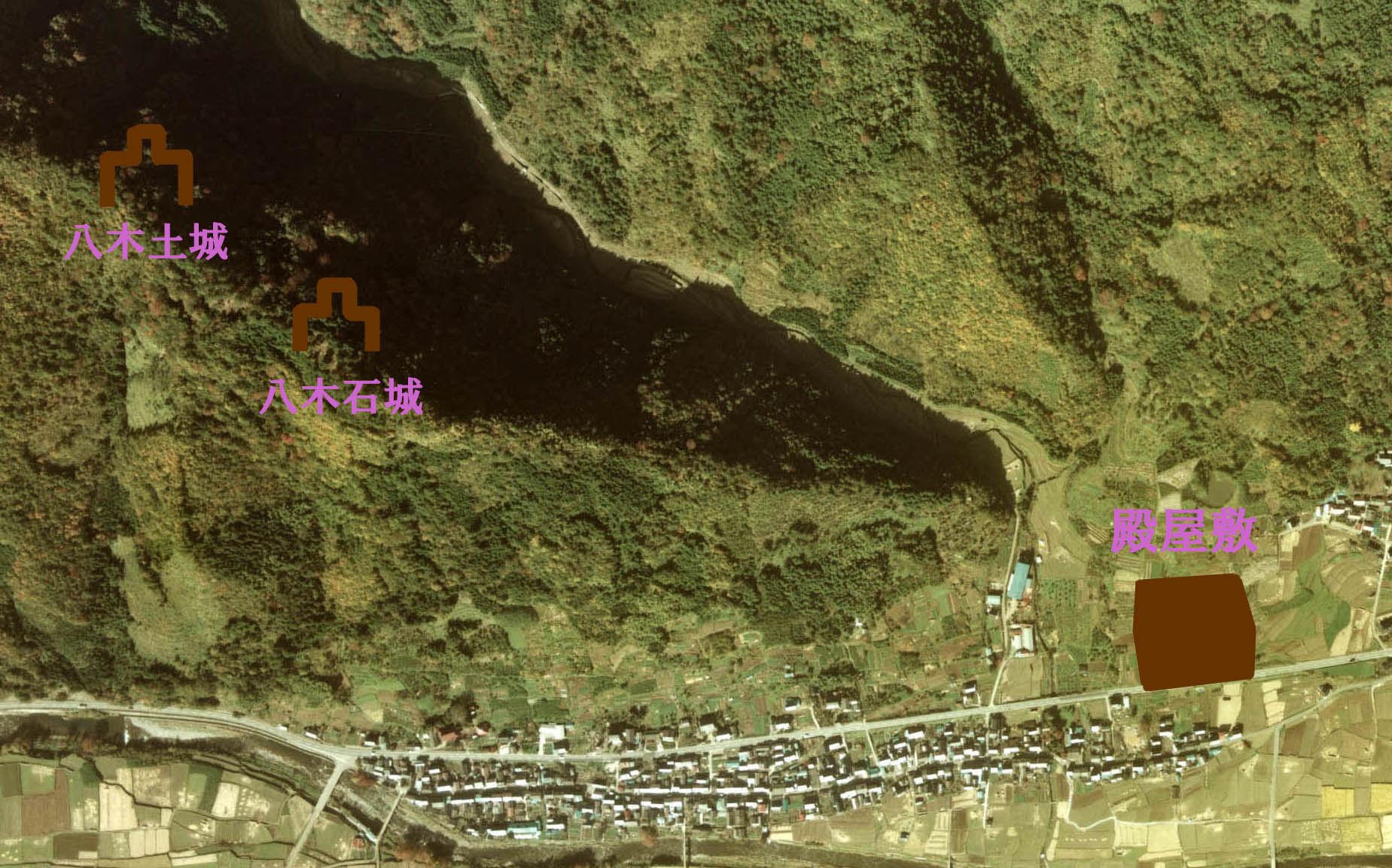
Aerial photograph showing the relative locations of the old castle, new castle and Kamakura-period mansion

Yagi Castle (八木城, Yagi-jō) is a late Kamakura period Japanese castle located in the Yōka neighborhood of the city of Yabu, Hyōgo Prefecture, Japan. Its ruins have been protected as a National Historic Site since 1997. The ruins are regarded as historically important, as the site includes the traces of a Kamakura period feudal mansion, Muromachi period mountain castle with clay walls, and the ruins of a Sengoku period castle with stone walls.

== History ==
Yagi Castle is situated in a strategic border area between the Kansai region and the San'in region, overlooking the ancient San'in highway connecting Tajima Province with Inaba Province. The castle has town locations. One is at Mount Tsuchiyama, with an elevation of 409 meters (which is called the "Yagi Kojō", or "old Yagi Castle") and the other at Mount Shiroyama, with an elevation 303 meters, with the two areas connected by a 450-meter ridge. The castle is located only 15 kilometers from Takeda Castle, whose history it partly shares.

Although there is little documentary evidence, according to local folklore, following the Former Nine Years' War, Minamoto no Yoshiie was awarded Tajima Province, and he ordered the construction of Yagi Castle in 1063. In 1194, the province was awarded by Minamoto no Yoriie to Asakura Takakiyo, who but Asakura Castle. His second son, Shigekiyo, was given the old Yagi Castle, and he changed his name to "Yagi Shigekiyo". The Yagi clan continued to rule the surrounding area for the next three centuries. During the Muromachi period, Tajima came under the control of the powerful Yamana clan, and the Yagi accepted the Yamana as overlords. However, following the Onin War the power of the Yamana was greatly weakened. In 1575, the 15th castellan of Yagi Castle, Yagi Toyonobu was approached by both the Mōri clan from the west, and Oda Nobunaga from the east. Initially, the Yagi cooperated with the Mōri, but in 1579 surrendered to Nobunaga's general, Toyotomi Hidenaga in exchange for being allowed to keep their castle and territory. As per the terms of his surrender, Yagi Toyonobu was ordered to lead an army against the Mōri at Tottori Castle in 1580 and was ordered togaed Wakasa Oni-ga-jo Castle (also in Tottori). He was defeated in a counterattack by Mori forces in 1581, and went missing-in-action. Consequently, Toyotomi Hideyoshi seized Yagi Castle and awarded it to Bessho Shigemune as part of a 15,000 koku fief.

Bessho Shigemune rebuilt the castle into its current configuration, with a new inner bailey with connecting kuruwa enclosures on all sides, yagura watchtowers, and stone walls lining the fortifications facing the jōkamachi, which had grown up along the route of the San'in highway. The total area of the castle extended to 340 meters long by 260 meters in width. The old castle, located 500 meters to the west and 200 meters up a steep slope, with its clay walls and dry moats, continued to be used for a timeout eventually was abandoned.

During the Battle of Sekigahara in 1600, Bessho Yoshiharu, son of Shigemune, supported Ishida Mitsunari and attacked Tanabe Castle held by Hosokawa Fujitaka; however, after the defeat of the Western Army, he was pardoned by Tokugawa Ieyasu as his aunt had once been a wet nurse to Tokugawa Hidetada. In 1628, he was dispossessed of his domain for negligence in attendance to his duties at Edo Castle, which may have been a pretext for the shogunate to seize control of a gold mine located on his territories. Yagi Castle was abandoned at that time.

The Yagi mansion was located at the foot of Yagi Castle, and was excavated in 1989. A moat and the foundation pillars for buildings were uncovered, and many relics including Chinese ceramics from the latter half of the 12th century to the latter half of the 14th century were found.

At present, there are no structures remaining on the mountain except for some partial stone walls, and the climbing route is not well marked.

== Gallery ==
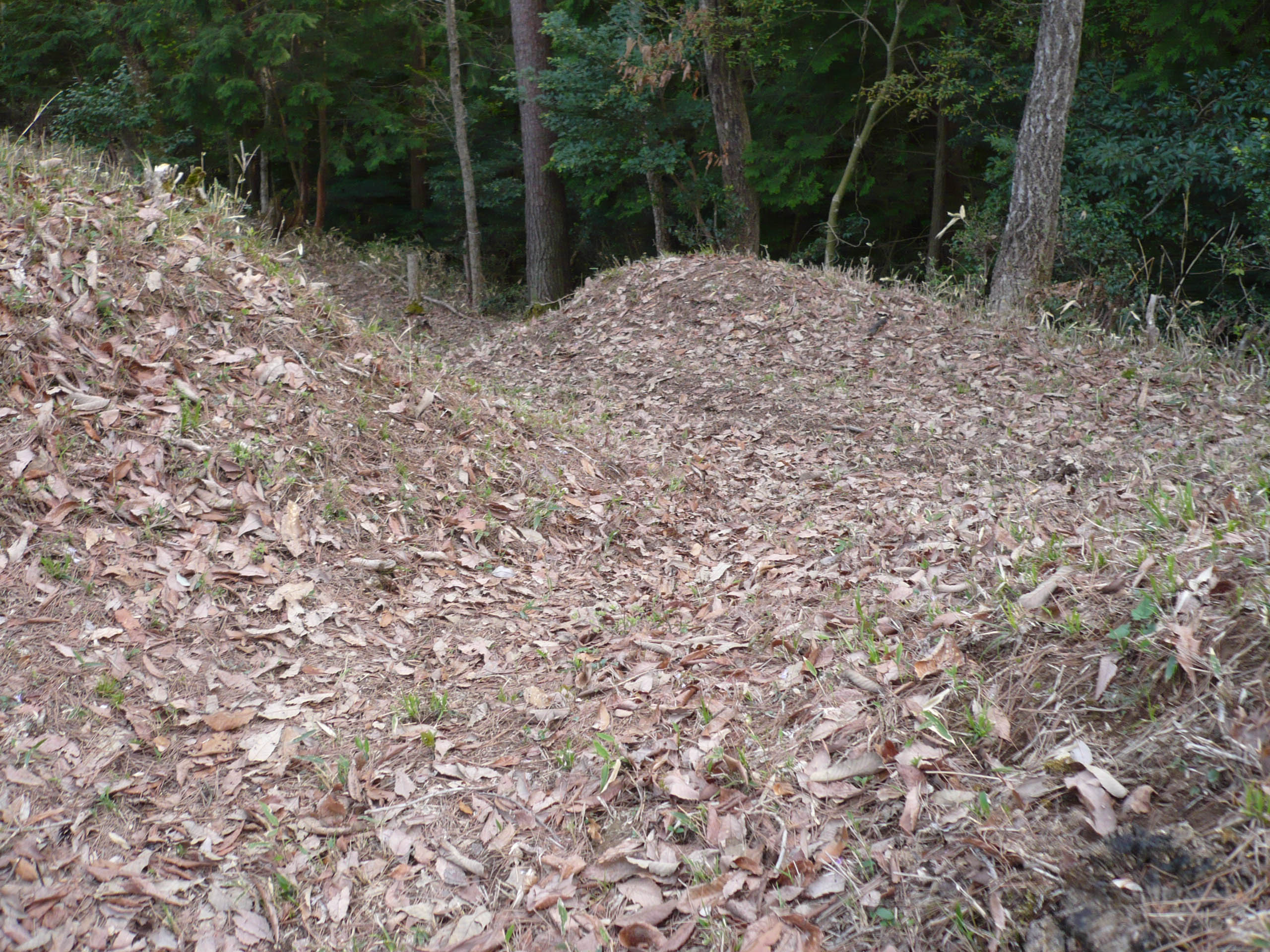
Ruins of old Yagi Castle

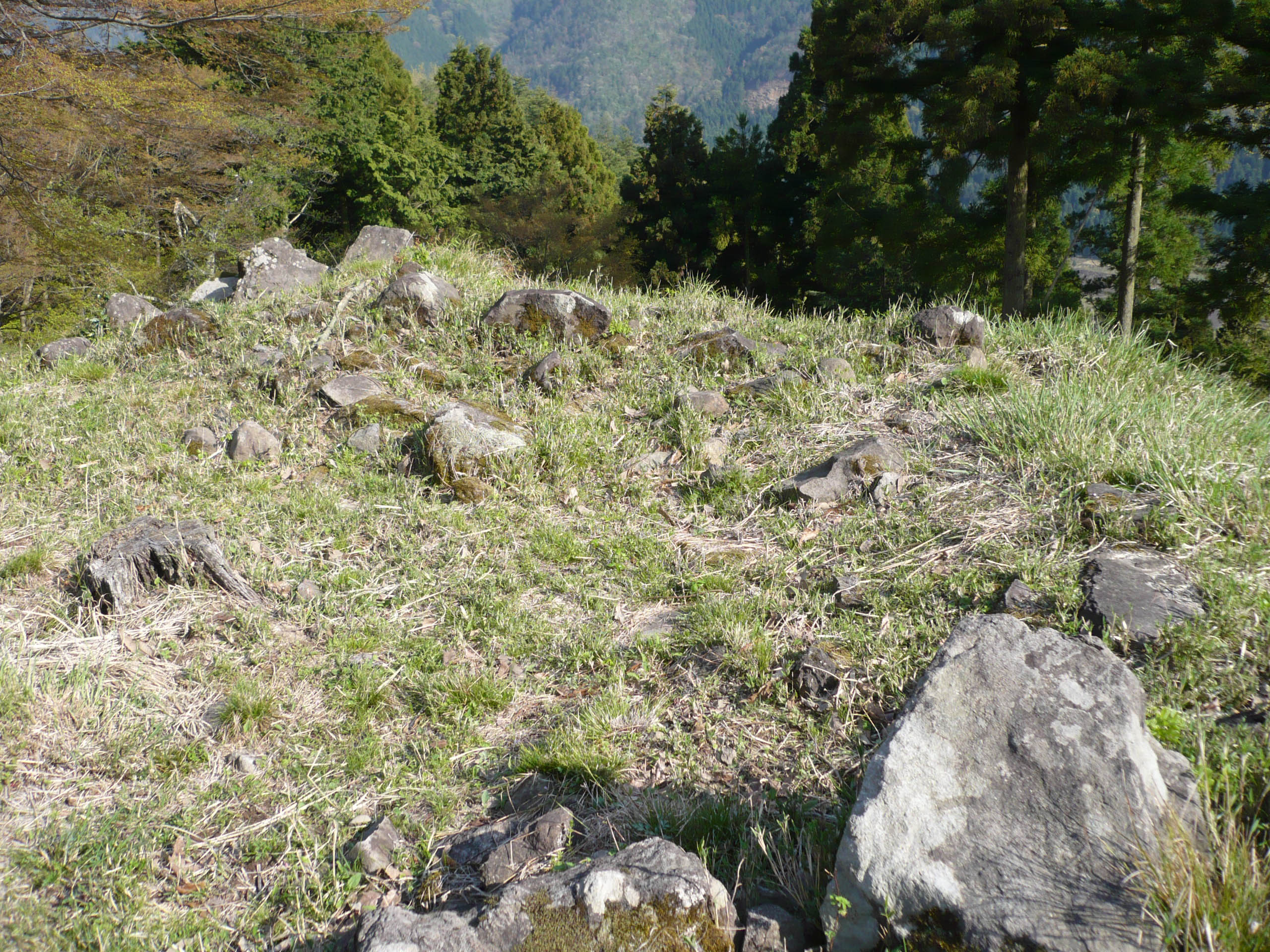
Foundations of a building in Yagi Castle

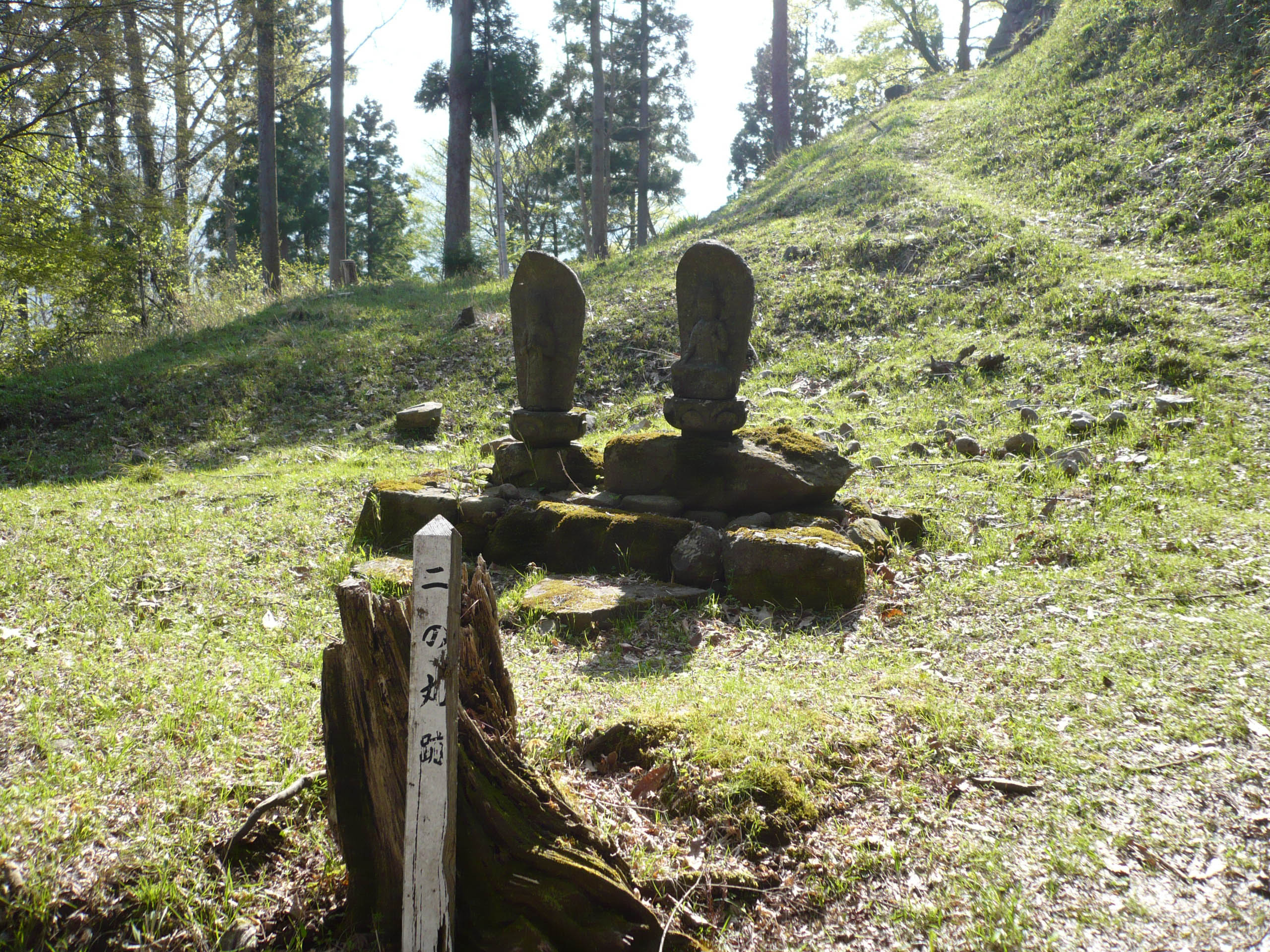
Site of Ni-no-maru Enclosure

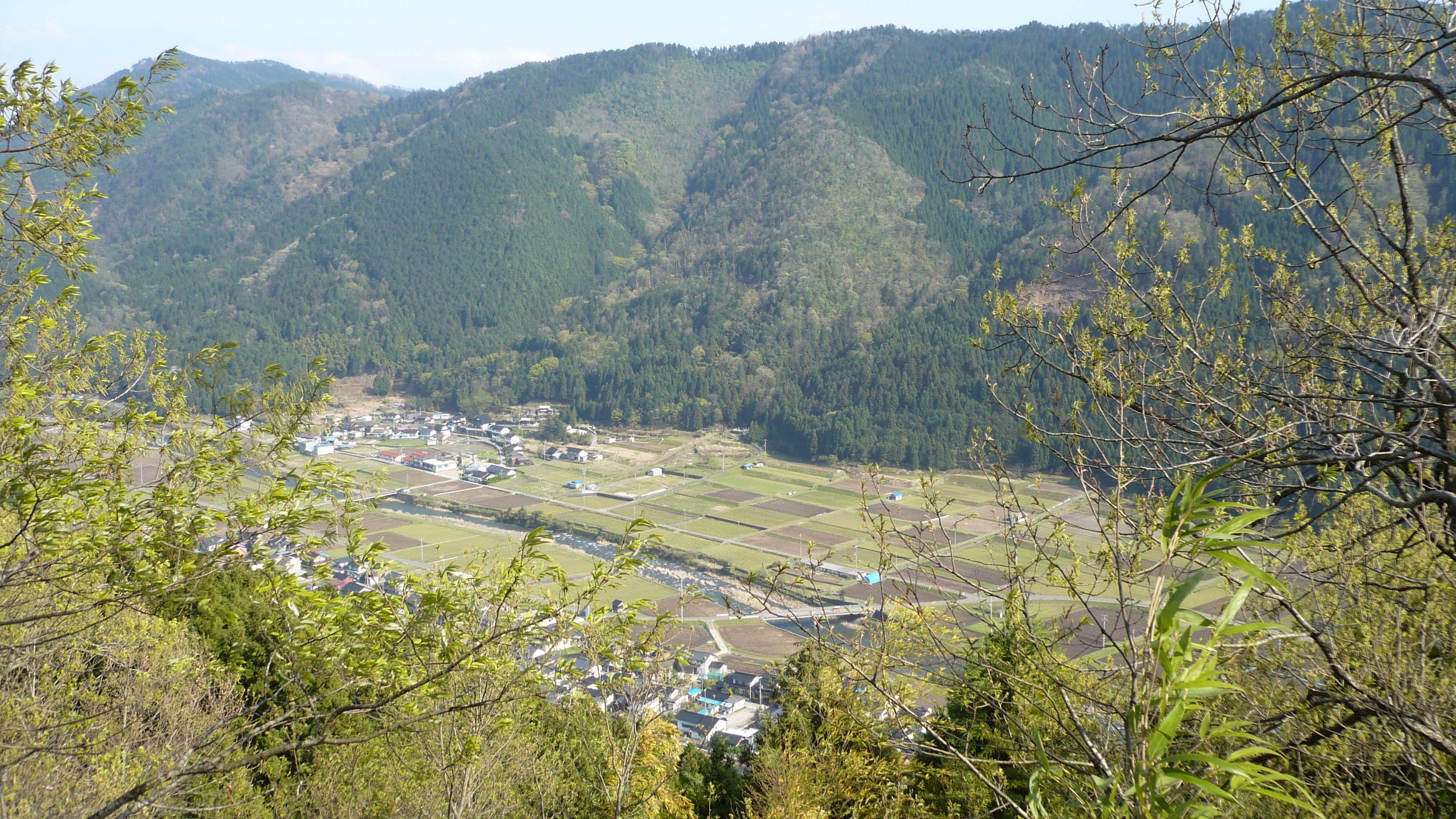
View from Yagi Castle

== See also ==
- List of Historic Sites of Japan (Hyōgo)
