= Ebara Station =

Railway station in Toyooka, Hyōgo Prefecture, Japan

Ebara Station 江原駅
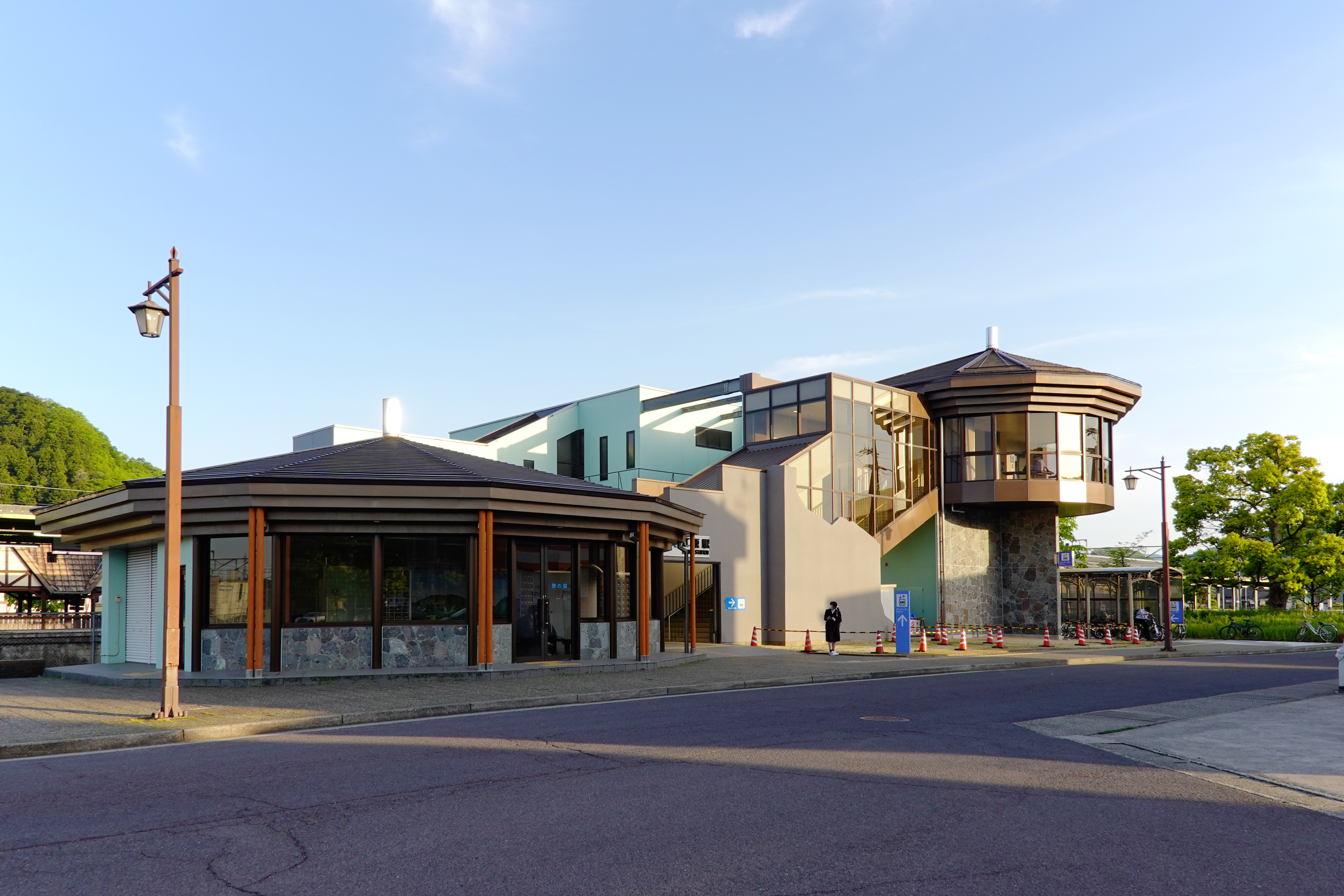
- West side, May 2023

General information
- Location: 13-2 Hioki Yagumi, Hidaka-cho, Toyooka-shi, Hyōgo-ken 669-5341; Japan
- Coordinates: 35°28′10″N 134°46′33″E
- Owner: West Japan Railway Company
- Operator: West Japan Railway Company
- Line: San'in Main Line
- Distance: 138.7 km (86.2 miles) from Kyoto
- Platforms: 1 island platform
- Connections: Bus stop

Construction
- Structure type: Ground level

Other information
- Status: Staffed (Midori no Madoguchi)
- Website: Official website

History
- Opened: 10 July 1909

Passengers
- FY 2023: 1,088 daily
Location
- Location within Hyōgo Prefecture Location within Japan

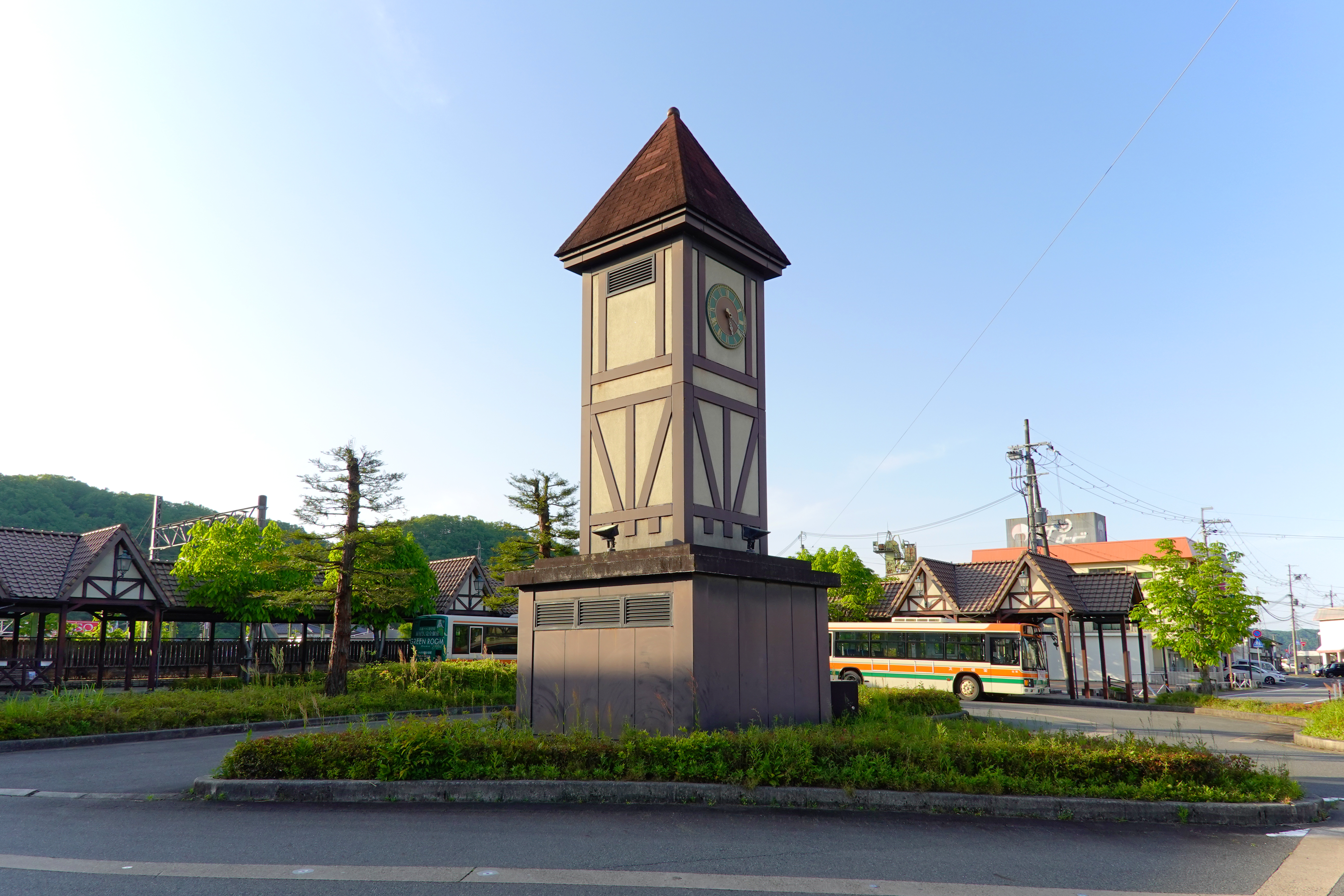
East side

Ebara Station (江原駅, Ebara-eki) is a passenger railway station located in the city of Toyooka, Hyōgo Prefecture, Japan, operated by West Japan Railway Company (JR West).

== Lines ==
Ebara Station is served by the San'in Main Line, and is located 138.7 kilometers from the terminus of the line at Kyoto.

== Station layout ==
The station consists of one ground-level island platform with an elevated station building. The station has a Midori no Madoguchi staffed ticket office.

=== Platforms ===
1	■ San'in Main Line	for Kyoto and Osaka
2	■ San'in Main Line	for Toyooka and Kinosaki Onsen

== Adjacent stations ==
«	Service	»
West Japan Railway Company (JR West) Sanin Main Line
Yōka	Local	Kokufu
Yoka	Limited Express Hamakaze	Toyooka

== History ==
Ebara Station opened on July 10, 1909. With the privatization of the Japan National Railways (JNR) on April 1, 1987, the station came under the aegis of the West Japan Railway Company.

== Passenger statistics ==
In fiscal 2017, the station was used by an average of 587 passengers daily.

== Surrounding area ==
- Maruyama River
- Tajima Kokubun-ji Ruins
- Tajima Kokufu / Kokubunjikan

== See also ==
- List of railway stations in Japan
