= Guildfordia subfimbriata =

Scientific classification
- Kingdom: Animalia
- Phylum: Mollusca
- Class: Gastropoda
- Subclass: Vetigastropoda
- Order: Trochida
- Superfamily: Trochoidea
- Family: Turbinidae
- Genus: Guildfordia
- Species: †G. subfimbriata

Binomial name
- †Guildfordia subfimbriata (Suter, 1917)

Synonyms
- Astraea subfimbriata Suter, 1917; Guildfordia (Opella) subfimbriata (Suter, 1917)

Extinct species of gastropod

Guildfordia subfimbriata is an extinct species of sea snail, a marine gastropod mollusk, in the family Turbinidae, the turban snails.
