= Tajima Kokubun-ji =

Buddhist temple in Toyooka, Hyōgo, Japan

- 但馬国分寺
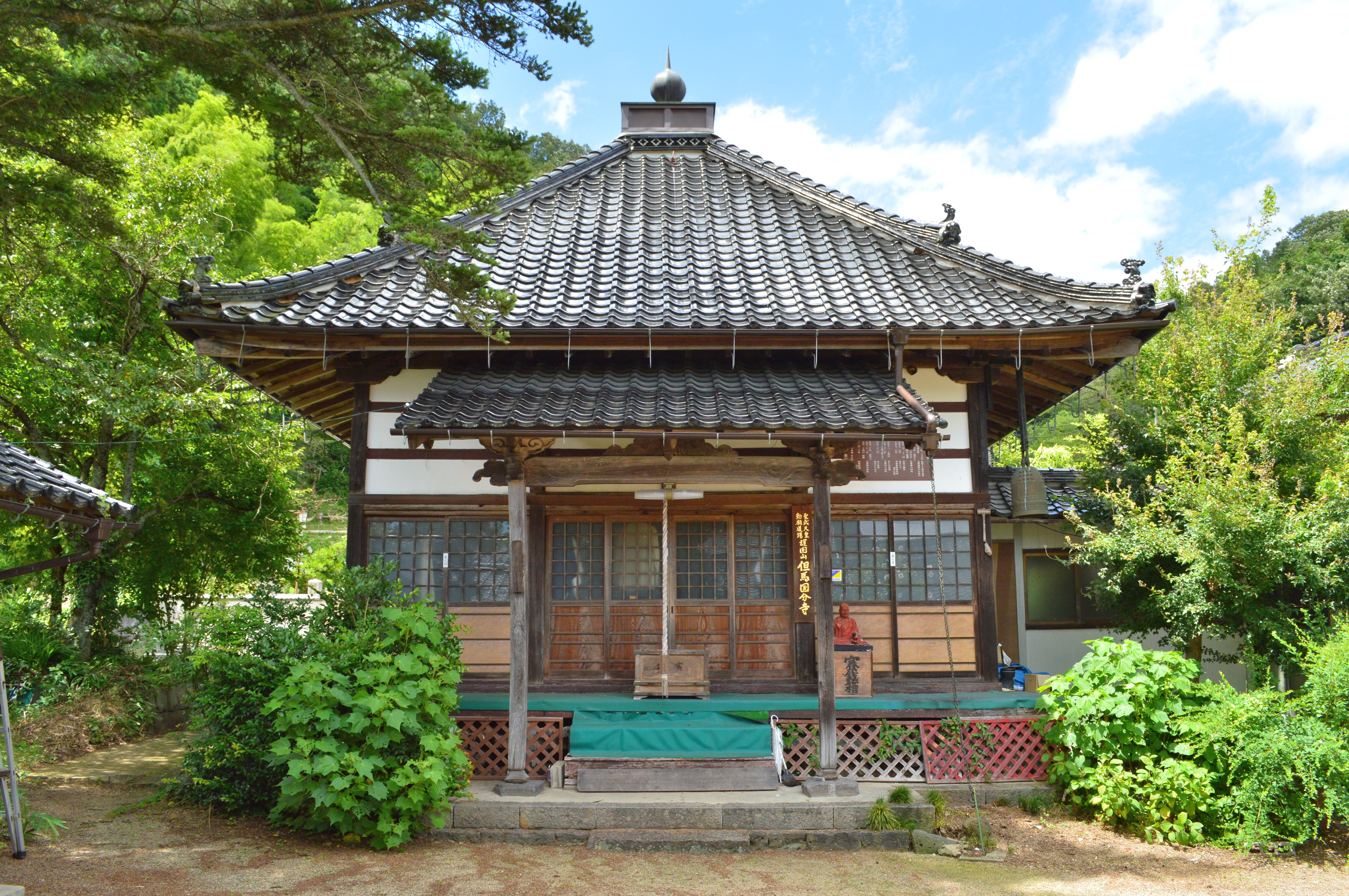
- Modern Tajima Kokubun-ji

- Location within Hyōgo Prefecture Location within Japan

Religion
- Affiliation: Buddhist
- Deity: Yakushi Nyōrai
- Rite: Jōdo-shū
- Status: functional

Location
- Location: Hidaka-chō, Toyooka-shi, Hyōgo 411-0037
- Country: Japan
- Interactive map of Tajima Kokubun-ji
- Coordinates: 35°28′19.12″N 134°46′26.00″E

Architecture
- Founder: Emperor Shōmu
- Completed: c.741
- National Historic Site of Japan

Tajima Kokubun-ji (但馬国分寺) is a Buddhist temple located in the Hidaka-chō neighborhood of the city of Toyooka, Hyōgo, Japan. It belongs to the Jōdo-shū sect, and its main image is a Heian period statue of Yakushi Nyorai. The statue of a designated Tangible Cultural Property of Toyooka City. The temple is the modern successor of one of the provincial temples established by Emperor Shōmu during the Nara period (710–794) for the purpose of promoting Buddhism as the national religion of Japan and standardising control of imperial rule over the provinces. The foundation stones for the original temple were designated as a National Historic Site in 1990, with the area under protection extended in 2000, 2004, 2011, 2013 and 2015.

== History ==
The Shoku Nihongi records that in 741, as the country recovered from a major smallpox epidemic, Emperor Shōmu ordered that a monastery and nunnery be established in every province, the kokubunji (国分寺).

The Tajima Kokubun-ji is located in the Kokufu Plain formed by the Maruyama River in the southern part of Toyooka City. The current precincts overlap with the ruins of ancient provincial temple, and the ruins of Kokubun-niji provincial nunnery are located about one kilometer to the north. In addition, the Narafugamori site, which is presumed to be the remains of the provincial capital after the Heian period, is also located in the vicinity (the location of the capital before the Heian period is unknown).

The precise date of the construction of the Tajima Kokubun-ji has not been confirmed from archaeological materials or literature, however, it is mentioned in an entry in the "Shoku Nihongi" dated 756, so it must have been built soon after Emperor Shōmu's proclamation of 741. Archaeologically, dendrochronology on wood found in a well on the site yielded a date of 763, and a mokkan (wooden tablet) found at the site estimated to date from 767 to 770 lists some of the temple's organization, staffing and structures, including a pagoda, which another wooden tablet lists as having been damaged by a lightning strike in 777. The temple is listed in the Engishiki records of 927 as having a revenue of 20,000 bundles of rice. As with most of the kokubun-ji around the country, the temple fell into decline with the collapse of the Ritsuryō system of central government authority at the end of the Heian period, and its subsequent history becomes confused. Per a document dated 1285, it appears that the temple had become a shōen landed estate controlled by the "Hosshō-ji clan", which received tax exemption from Northern Court Emperor Kōgon in 1338. It was the site of number of battles during the Nanboku-chō period and was often referred to as "Kokubunji Castle", although a temple also remained on the site, as other documents indicate that it became a subsidiary of Saidai-ji in Nara in 1381. In 1580, Toyotomi Hidenaga defeated Ōtsubo Matashirō during his conquest of Tajima Province, and the temple burned down during that struggle. It appears that the site remained in ruins until the temple was revived in 1759. In 1814, Ino Tadataka surveyed the area, leaving a record of the location of the temple's remains and that of the provincial nunnery.

The site of the ancient temple was first excavated in 1973, and excavations continued 34 times through 2016. The temple occupied and area 160 meters square, and consisted of a South Gate, Central Gate, Kondō and Kōdō (Lecture Hall) in a straight line from south to north. A cloister extended from the sides of the Middle Gate to the Main Hall, and the Pagoda was located 50 meters to the west of the Main Hall. Judging from the size and layout of the foundation, the pagoda was a seven-story structure. In the southeast corner of the compound, the remains of an enclosing wall and moat have been found. Per the standardized "Shichidō garan" layout of buildings, similar to Tōdai-ji in Nara, upon which the kokubunji temples were based, other structures such as a sutra library and bell tower should have existed, but these foundations have not been found, and not all of the foundation stones served by Ino Tadataka in 1814 remain in situ. On the other hand, the foundations of a large building with a corridor (more than 70 meters north-south) has been found to the east of the Main Hall. This is the first example of a building other than a Main Hall with a corridor found at any kokubunji site, and the function of the building remains uncertain.

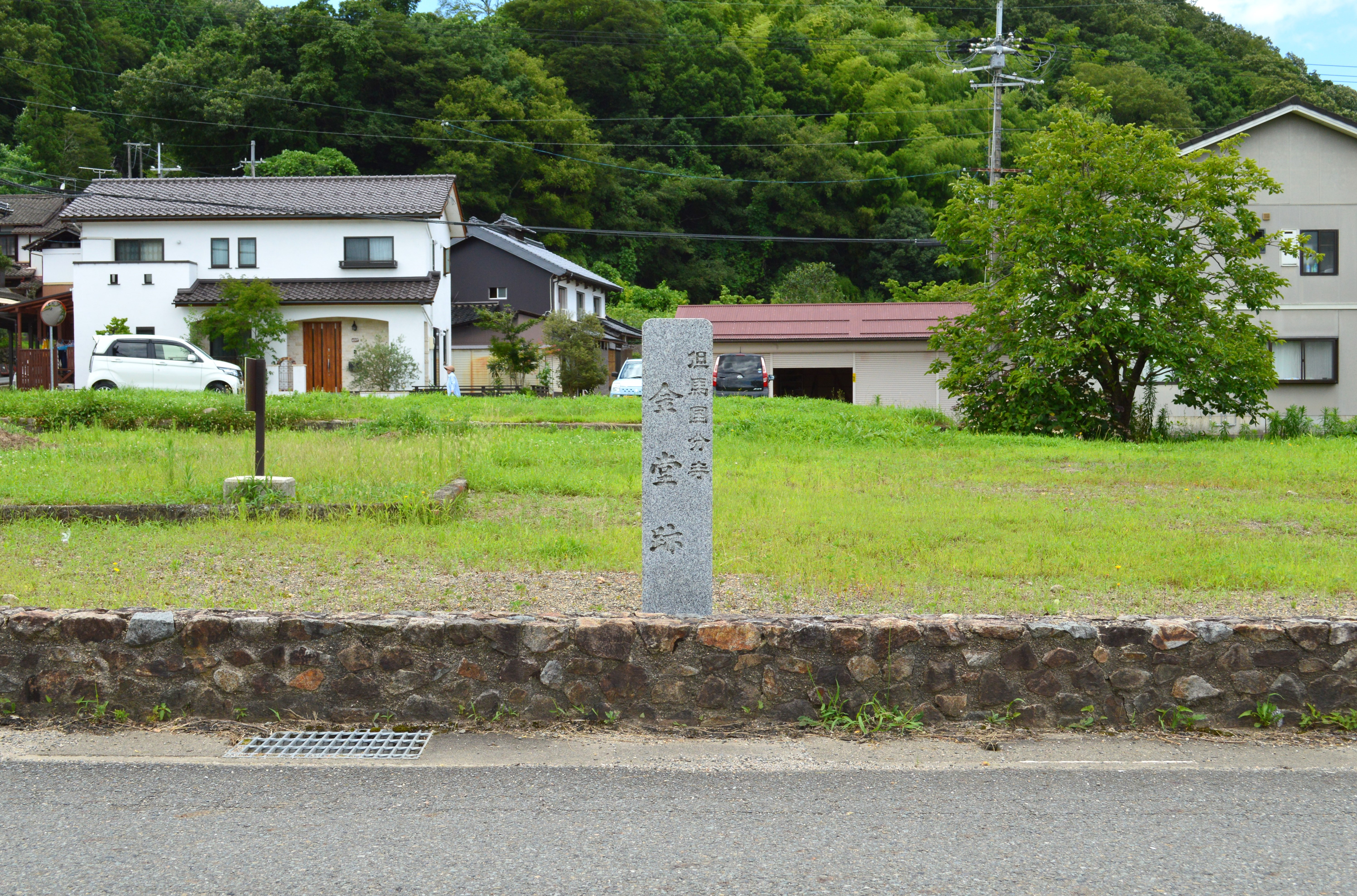
Site of the Kondo

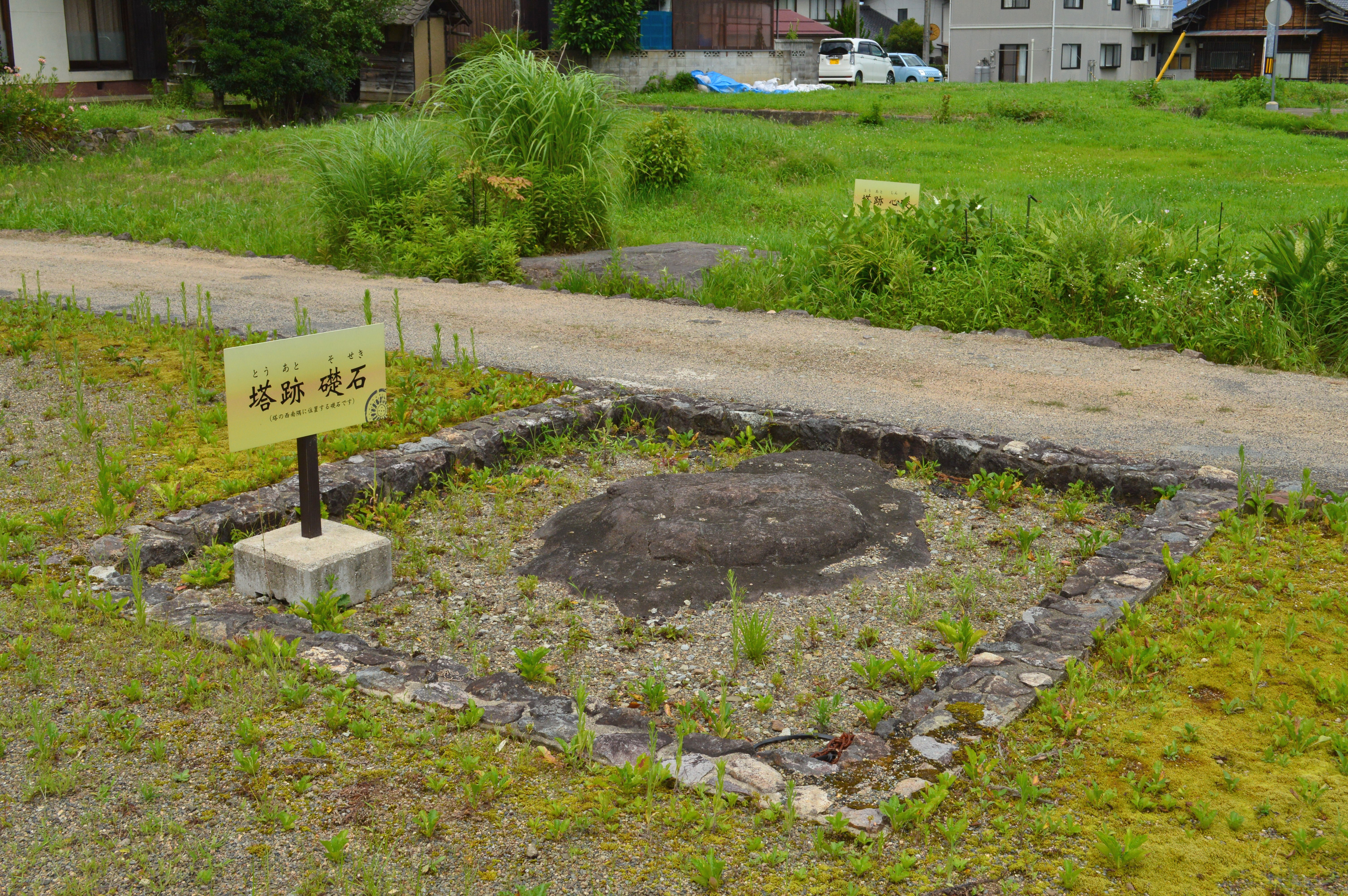
Foundations of the Pagoda

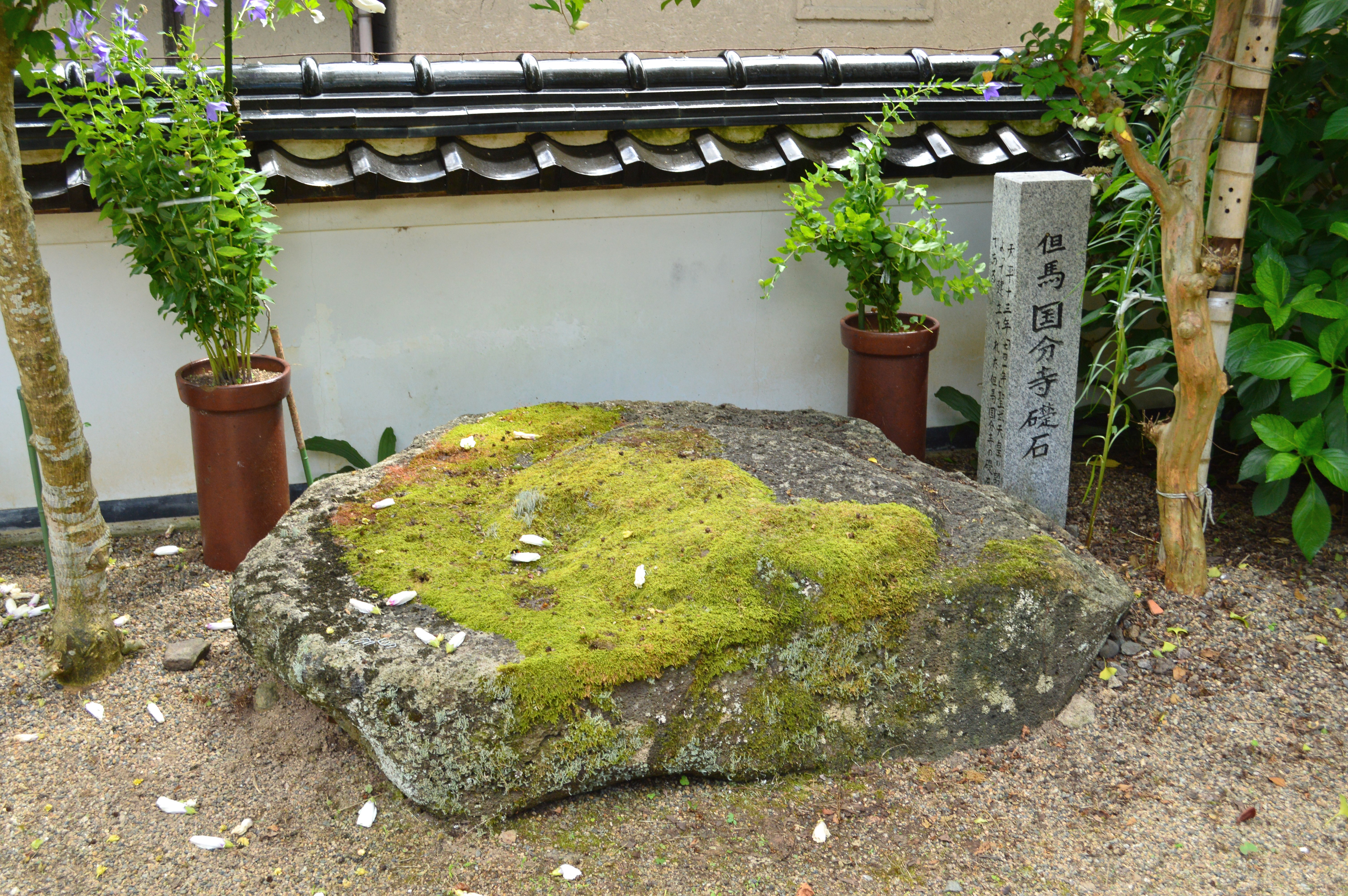
Foundations of the South Gate

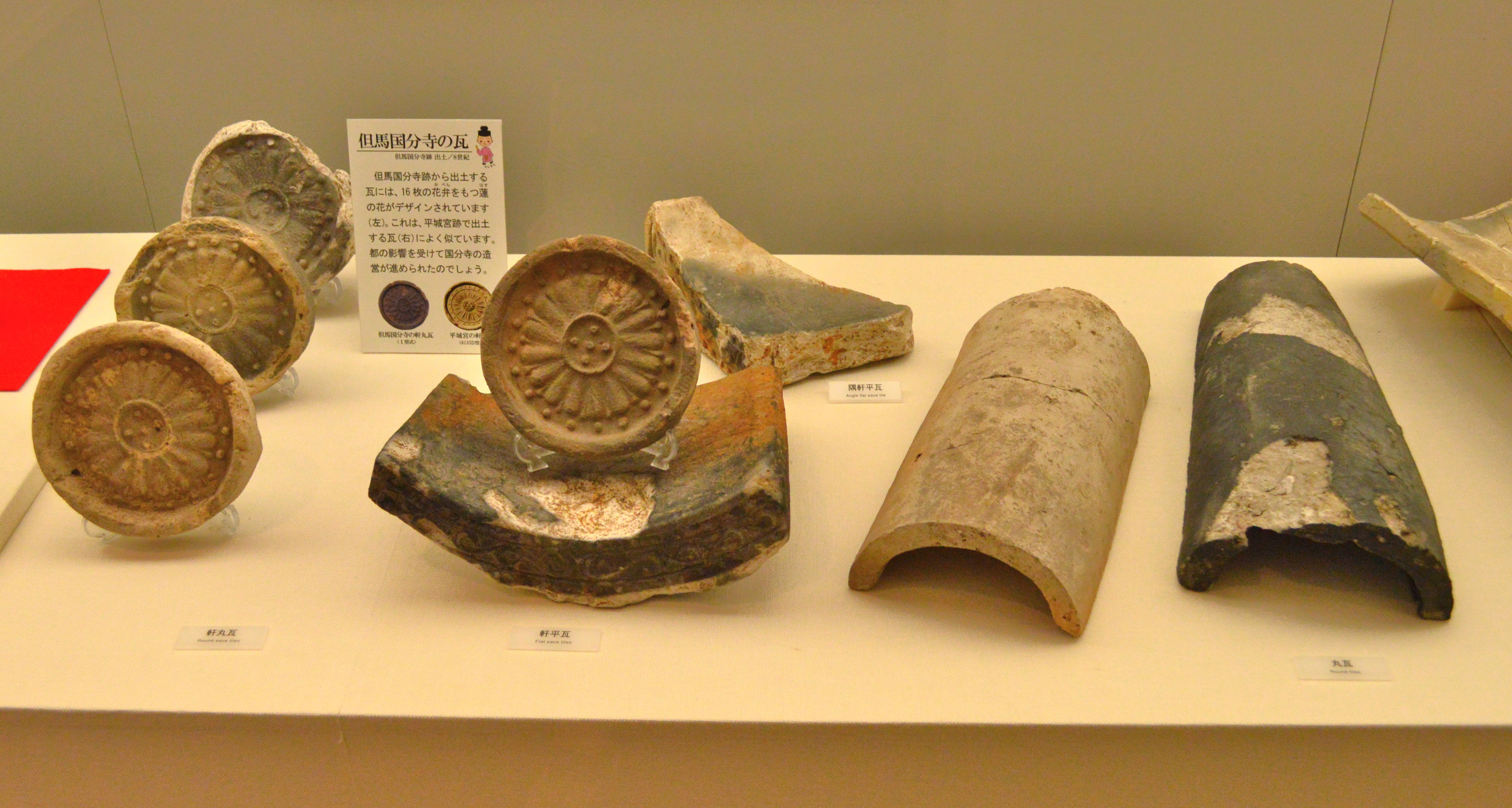
Roof tiles

Recovered artifacts, including many roof tiles, earthenware and mokkan as well as other wooden items are preserved at the Museum of Tajima Kokufu and Kokubunji (但馬国府・国分寺館) at site The temple is located a five-minute walk from Ebara Station on the JR West San'yo Main Line railway. The mokkan are a designated Tangible Cultural Property of Toyooka City.

== Tajima Kokubun-niji ==
The remains of what is believed to be the nunnery associated with the Tajima Kokubun-ji are located in the Mizukami/Yamamoto, Hidaka-cho neighborhood of Toyooka City, about one kilometer north of the remains of the Tajima Kokubun-ji (near Toyooka Municipal Hidaka East Junior High School. Currently, only two cornerstones remain, and details of the temple are unclear. Per Ino Tadataka's survey, seven cornerstones existed as of1814. Currently, the aforementioned two remain at the site of the nunnery

In addition, in Yamamoto, Hidaka-cho, Toyooka, there is the Sōtō Zen temple of Hokke-ji, which claims to be the successor to the Tajima Kokubun-niji. It has several cornerstones within the temple grounds which it claims to have been from that temple, although they do not appear to be in situ.

== See also ==
- List of Historic Sites of Japan (Hyōgo)
- provincial temple
