= Yoko =

Yoko may refer to:

== People and fictional characters ==
- Yoko (name), a Japanese feminine given name; variants include Yōko and Yohko, including a list of people and Japanese fictional characters (for non-Japanese characters, see the Arts and entertainment section)
- Yoko Alender (born 1979), Estonian architect and politician
- Yoko Gushiken (具志堅 用高, born 1955), Japanese professional boxer
- Yoko Taro (横尾 太郎, born 1970), Japanese video game director
- Madam Yoko (1849–1906), leader of the Mende people in Sierra Leone
- Yoko Kurama, full demon form of Shuichi (Kurama) from the Shonen Yu Yu Hakusho

== Places ==
- Yoko, Benin, an arrondissement in the Plateau department of Benin
- Yoko, Cameroon, a commune in the Mbam-et-Kim department of the Centre Region in Cameroon

== Arts and entertainment ==
- Yoko, a 2012 German film
- Yoko (TV series), a Russian-Spanish 3D animated television series
- "Yoko" (Flight of the Conchords), an episode of the television series Flight of the Conchords
- Yoko (album) (2003), by American indie rock band Beulah
- "Yoko", a version of the song "Paradise" by Berner that appears on the 2014 reissue of The White Album
- "Yoko", a song by Maisie Peters from The Good Witch (Deluxe), 2023

== See also ==
- Yuki (disambiguation)
