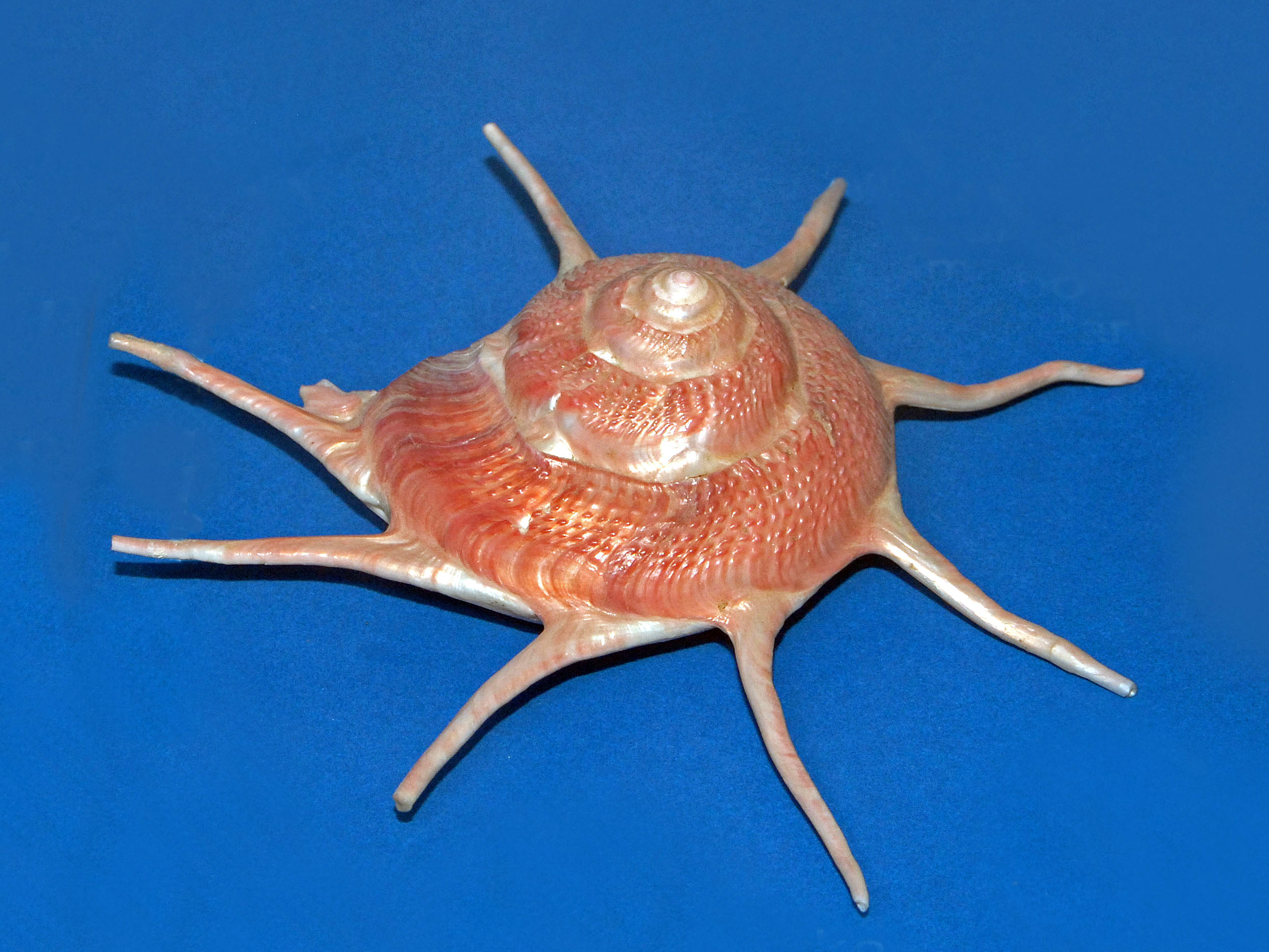
- Shell of Guildfordia yoka. Museum specimen

Scientific classification
- Kingdom: Animalia
- Phylum: Mollusca
- Class: Gastropoda
- Subclass: Vetigastropoda
- Order: Trochida
- Family: Turbinidae
- Genus: Guildfordia
- Species: G. yoka

Binomial name
- Guildfordia yoka Jousseaume, 1899

Synonyms
- Guildfordia delicata Habe & Okutani, 1983; Guildfordia yoca Schepman, 1908; Guildfordia yoka delicata Habe & Okutani, 1983; Guildfordia yoka yoka Jousseaume, 1888

= Guildfordia yoka =

Species of gastropod

Guildfordia yoka, the yoka star turban, is a species of deep-water sea snail, a marine gastropod mollusk in the family Turbinidae, the turban snails.

== Distribution and habitat ==
This tropical marine species occurs in the Western Pacific off Japan and the Philippines, found at depths between 200 and 500 m (660 and 1,640 ft).

== Description ==
The size of the shell varies between 70 and 105 mm (2.8 and 4.1 in). The color pattern of the shell varies from very light brownish to purple-brown. Some specimens contain only 6 whorls instead of 7 as in the holotype. The upper whorls are smooth, then follows the body whorl with scarcely 2 rows of granules, instead of 7 or 8. Towards the keel it has very irregular radiating ribs, which leave however a nearly smooth zone above the keel, with only a few spiral striae.

The base of the shell is less convex than the upper part. Some specimens lack the rose-coloured line round the umbilical callosity. The aperture is oval, thick, with the nucleus in the external lower corner. The outer surface is slightly rugose, by irregular wrinkles, almost parallel with the basal margin of the operculum. The nucleus is marked by an olive spot.

== Biology ==
Embryos of Guildfordia yoka develop into free-swimming planktonic larvae with several bands of cilia (trochophore). Later they develop into juvenile veligers, finally into fully grown adults.

== Gallery ==
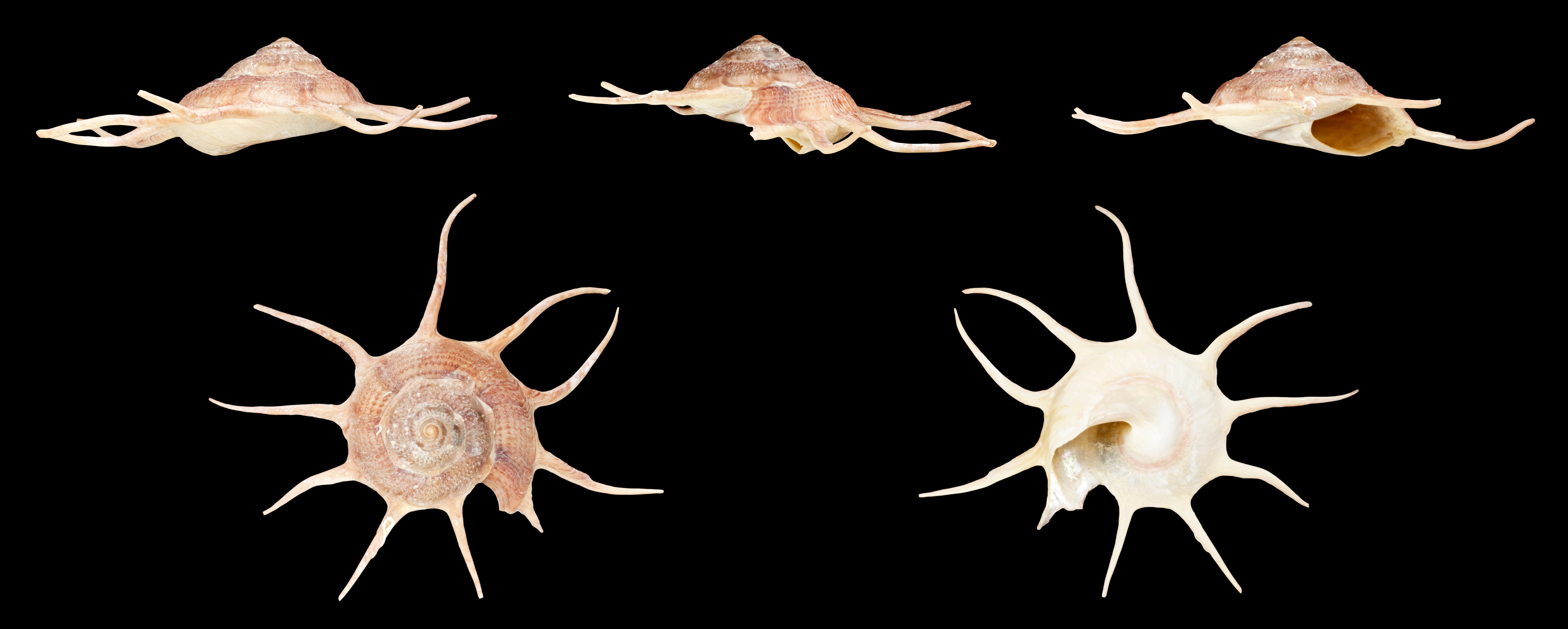
Guildfordia yoka

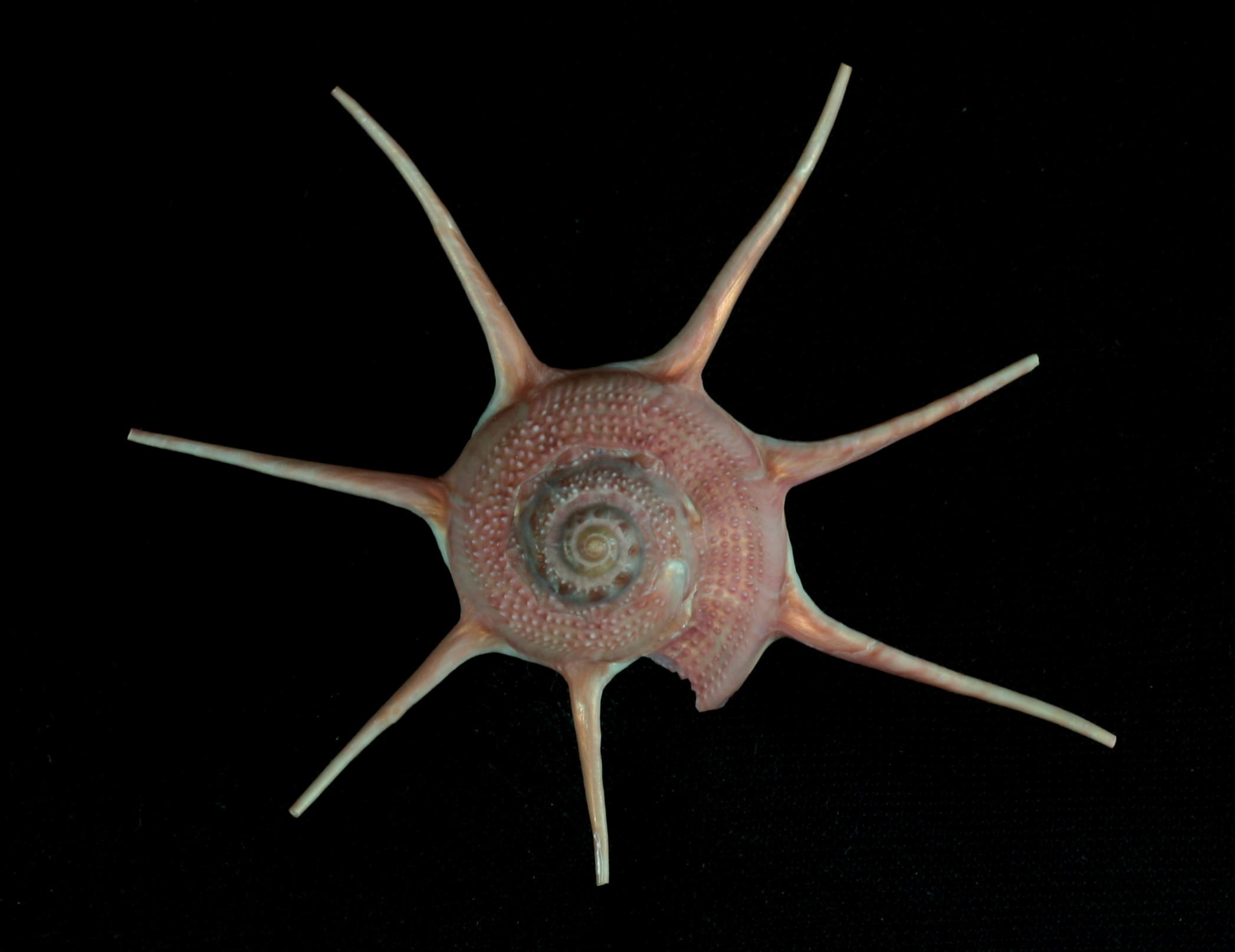
A shell of Guildfordia yoka Jousseaume, 1888, measuring 26.3 mm diameter, trawled at 100 m off Minabe, in Japan.

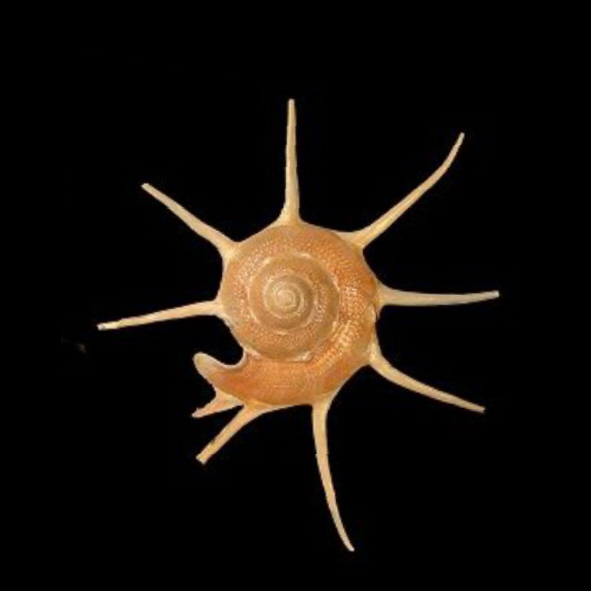
Apical view of a shell of Guildfordia yoka
