= Yōka Station =

Railway station in Yabu, Hyōgo Prefecture, Japan

Yōka Station 八鹿駅
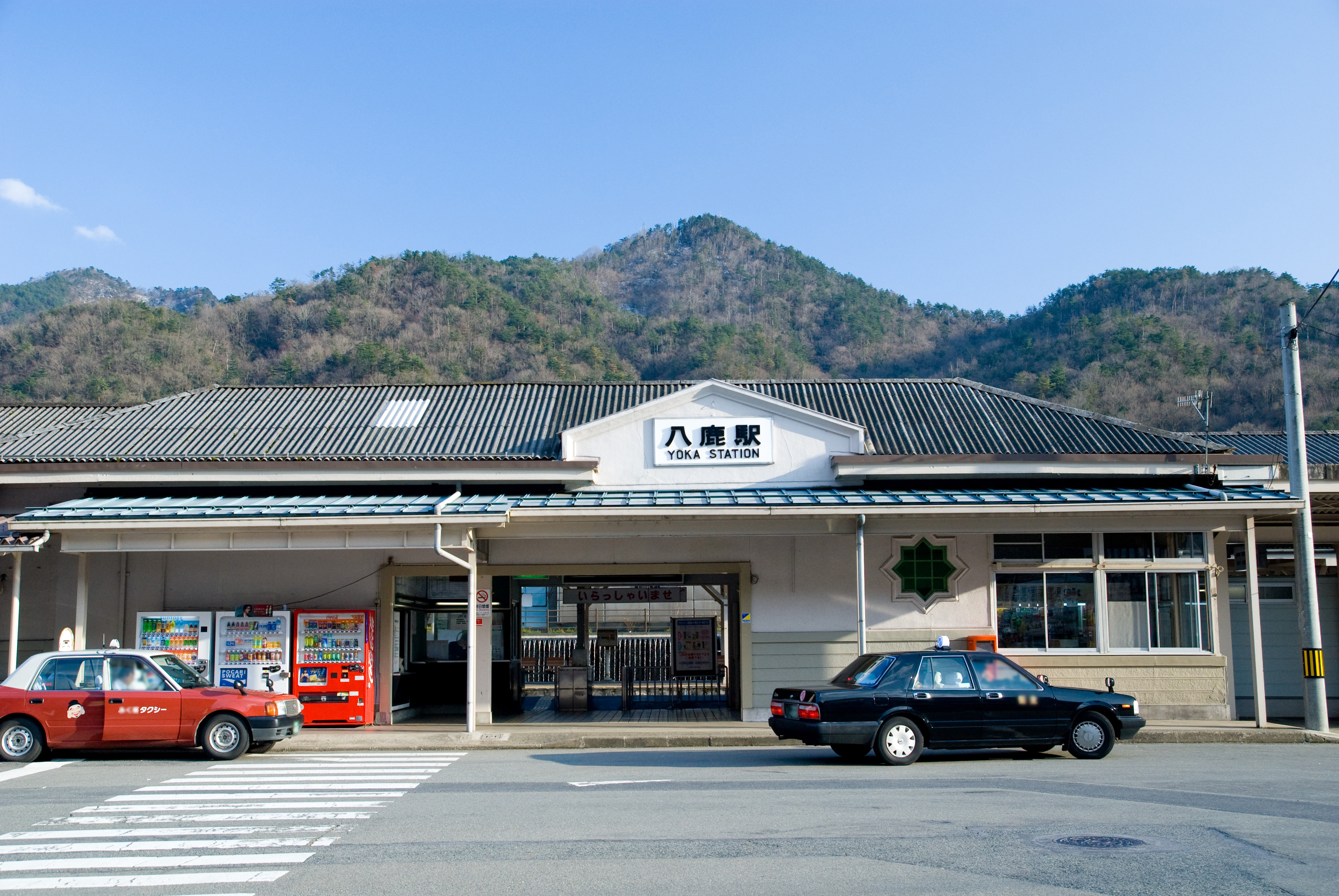
- Yōka Station, January 2010

General information
- Location: Yokacho Yoka, Yabu-shi, Hyōgo-ken 667-0021; Japan
- Coordinates: 35°24′52″N 134°46′54″E
- Owner: West Japan Railway Company
- Operator: West Japan Railway Company
- Line: San'in Main Line
- Distance: 131.2 km (81.5 miles) from Kyoto
- Platforms: 1 side + 1 island platform
- Connections: Bus stop

Construction
- Structure type: Ground level

Other information
- Status: Staffed (Midori no ticket vending machine plus installation)
- Website: Official website

History
- Opened: 10 July 1909

Passengers
- FY 2023: 800 daily

Services
JR West
Location
- Location within Hyōgo Prefecture Location within Japan

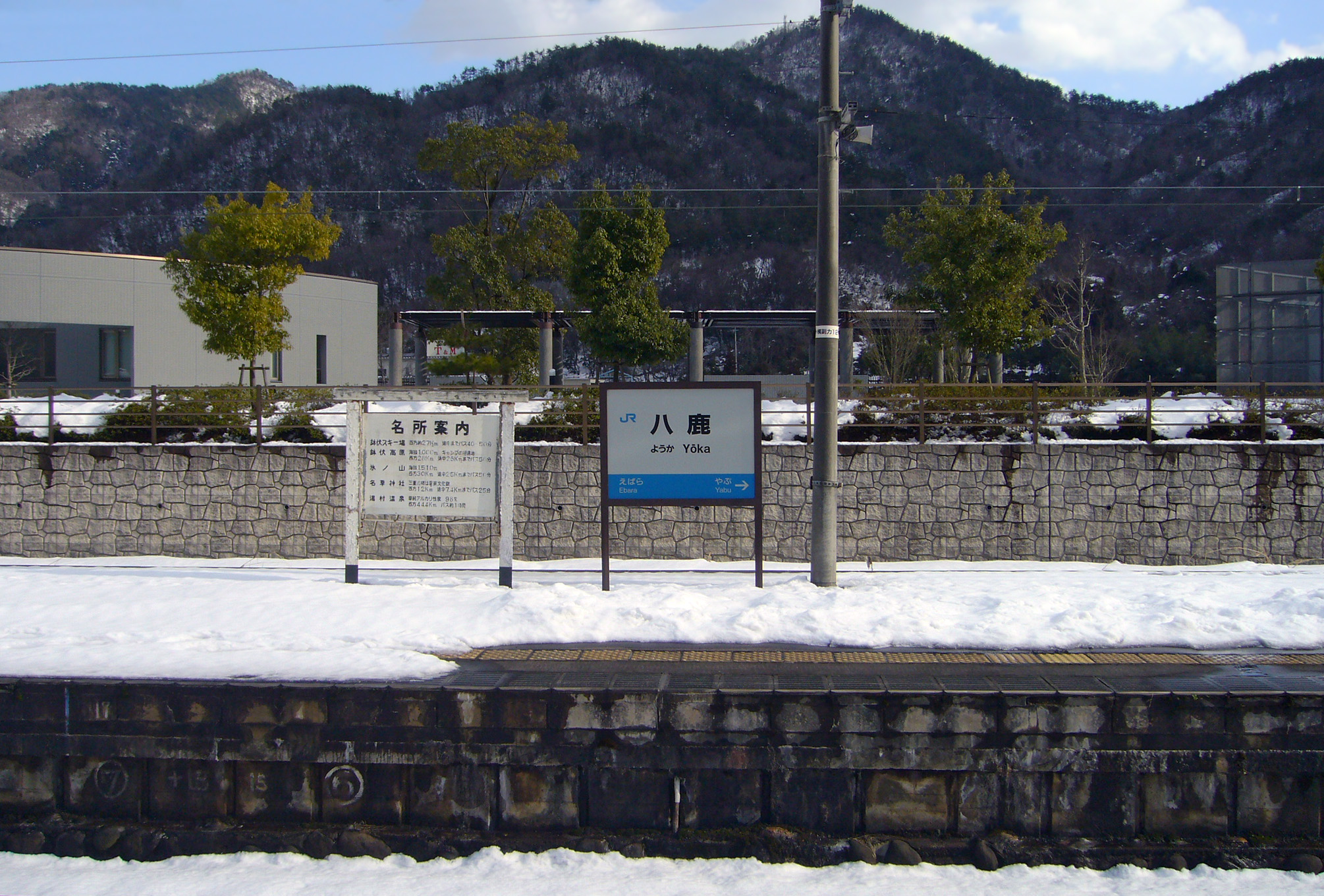
Yoka Station, Japan.

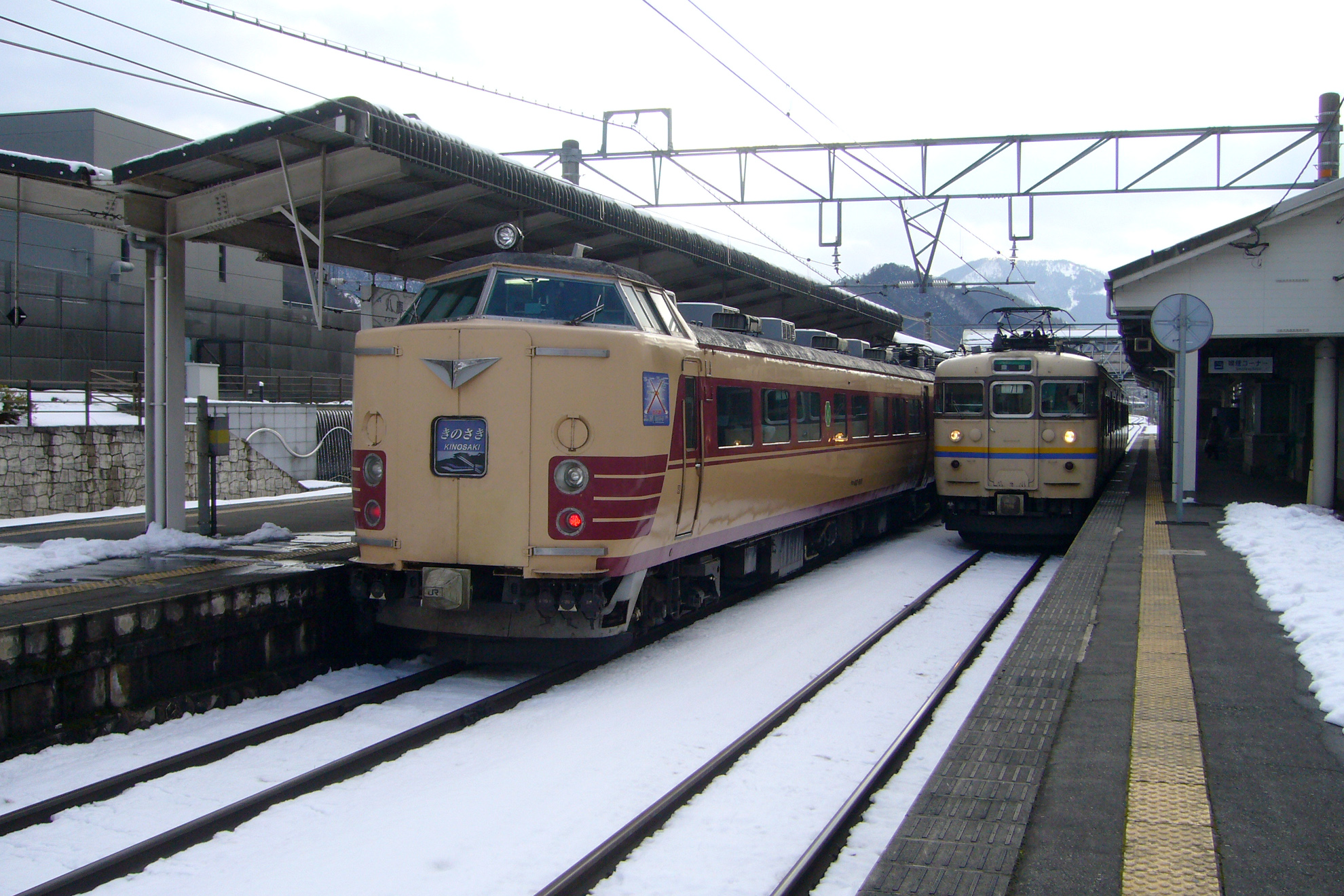
A platform in yoka station Japan.

Yōka Station (八鹿駅, Yōka-eki) is a passenger railway station located in the city of Yabu, Hyōgo Prefecture, Japan, operated by West Japan Railway Company (JR West).

== Lines ==
Yōka Station is served by the San'in Main Line, and is located 131.2 kilometers from the terminus of the line at Kyoto.

== Station layout ==
The station consists of one ground-level side platform and island platform connected by a footbridge. The station has a Midori no ticket vending machine plus.

=== Platforms ===
1, 2	■ San'in Main Line	for Kyoto and Osaka
3	■ San'in Main Line	for Toyooka and Kinosaki Onsen

== Adjacent stations ==
«	Service	»
West Japan Railway Company (JR West) Sanin Main Line
Yabu	Local	Ebara
Wadayama	Limited Express Hamakaze	Ebara

== History ==
Yōka Station opened on July 10, 1909. With the privatization of the Japan National Railways (JNR) on April 1, 1987, the station came under the aegis of the West Japan Railway Company.

== Passenger statistics ==
In fiscal 2016, the station was used by an average of 556 passengers daily

== Surrounding area ==
- Yabu City Hall (5 minutes by bus)
- Hyogo Prefectural Yoka High School (5 minutes by bus)
- Yoka Post Office

== See also ==
- List of railway stations in Japan
