= Yoka (name) =

Yoka or Yōka may refer to the following people:

Given name

- Yoka Berretty (1928–2015), Dutch actress
- Yōka Wao (born 1968), Japanese performing artist
- Youka Nitta (born 1971), Japanese yaoi manga artist
- N'Yoka Longo, a Congolese singer

Surname

- Aimé Emmanuel Yoka (1931/1932–2025), Congolese politician
- Patrick Yoka (born 1975), Polish television and film director and screenwriter
- Tony Yoka (born 1992), French boxer

Other

- Yoka Lokole, was a soukous band from Zaire
