= Yoko (album) =

Studio album by Beulah
- Released: September 9, 2003
- Recorded: February 2003
- Genre: Indie rock
- Length: 44:55
- Labels: Velocette Records; 943-010-2
- Producers: Roger Moutenot, Miles Kurosky

Beulah chronology
The Coast Is Never Clear (2001)	Yoko (2003)

Alternative cover
- The album cover for Yoko Demo

Professional ratings
Review scores
Source	Rating
Allmusic	4.5/5 stars
The Guardian	4/5 stars
Pitchfork Media	(6.8/10)
Rolling Stone	3/5 stars

Yoko is Beulah's final album, released on Velocette Records in 2003.

Before its release in September, the album appeared on the internet on July 4, 2003, due to an advance copy being leaked. To counteract this, the band, along with Velocette and Insound, offered a limited edition EP burned onto CD-R, which included demos and alternate versions of songs from Yoko. This EP was limited to 200 copies and was called Rarities, Demos & Besides.

Also released after the initial release of Yoko was a new version only sold on the Yoko tour and at independent record stores called Yoko Demo. It was an unmastered, unmixed copy of Yoko as recorded in the homes of band members Miles Kurosky and Bill Swan. The album was produced in limited numbers by Velocette.

== Track listing ==
All songs written by Miles Kurosky, except where noted.

1. "A Man Like Me" – 4:29
2. "Landslide Baby" – 4:58
3. "You're Only King Once" – 3:10
4. "My Side of the City" – 3:27
5. "Hovering" (Kurosky, Skip Wilkins) – 5:01
6. "Me and Jesus Don't Talk Anymore" – 4:51
7. "Fooled with the Wrong Guy" – 4:23
8. "Your Mother Loves You, Son" – 3:05
9. "Don't Forget to Breathe" – 3:56
10. "Wipe Those Prints and Run" – 7:35
