= Akamatsu =

Akamatsu (written: 赤松 lit. "red pine") is a Japanese surname. Notable people with the surname include:

- Akamatsu clan
  - Akamatsu Masanori (赤松 政範; died 1477), Japanese daimyō
  - Akamatsu Mitsusuke (赤松 満祐; 1381–1441), Japanese samurai
  - Akamatsu Norifusa (赤松 則房; 1559–1598), Japanese samurai
  - Akamatsu Norimura (赤松 則村; 1277–1350), Japanese samurai
  - Akamatsu Tōshōin, Japanese daimyō
- Hirotaka Akamatsu (赤松 広隆; born 1948), Japanese politician
- Hitoshi Akamatsu, Japanese video game designer.
- Ken Akamatsu (赤松 健; born 1968), Japanese manga artist
- Masao Akamatsu (赤松 正雄; born 1945), Japanese politician
- Masato Akamatsu (赤松 真人; born 1982), Japanese baseball player
- Naoki Akamatsu, guitarist in Hysteric Blue
- Ryoichi Akamatsu (赤松 諒一; born 1995), Japanese high jumper
- Ryōko Akamatsu (赤松 良子; 1929-2024), Japanese politician
- Sadaaki Akamatsu (赤松 貞明; 1910–1980), Japanese naval aviator and World War II flying ace
- Shuya Akamatsu (赤松 秀哉; born 1993), Japanese footballer

== Fictional characters ==
- Kaede Akamatsu (赤松 楓), a character in the video game Danganronpa V3: Killing Harmony
