= Kanjōsan Castle =

Castle in Hyōgo, Japan

- 感状山城
- Aioi, Hyōgo Prefecture, Japan
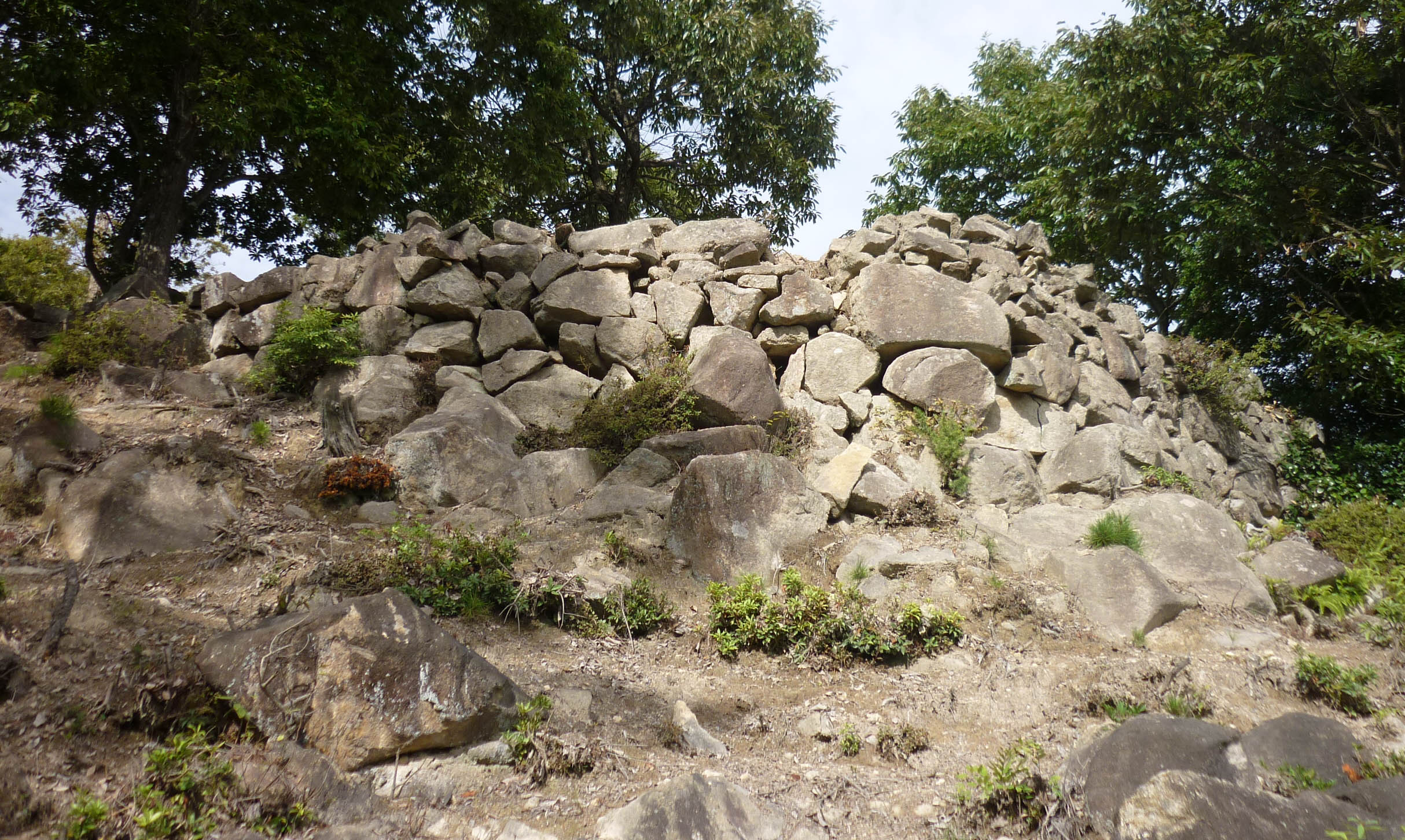
- Kanjōsan Castle

Site information
- Type: Yamajiro-style castle
- Owner: Akamatsu clan, Uragami clan, Ukita clan
- Condition: ruins

Location
- Kanjōsan Castle Kanjōsan Castle (Japan)
- Coordinates: 34°52′52.7″N 134°27′5.0″E

Site history
- Built: Kamakura period
- Demolished: 1603

Kanjōsan Castle (感状山城, Kanjōsan-jō) is the remains of a Muromachi period Japanese castle structure located in the city of Himeji, Hyōgo Prefecture, Japan. Its ruins have been protected as a National Historic Site as one of the Remains of Akamatsu-shi Castles, combining both Shirahata Castle and Okishio Castle, since 1996.

== Overview ==
Kanjōsan Castle is located on the 250-meter Mount Kanjōsan, north of the center of Aioi city. The site is in the middle of a narrow valley of the Yanagawa River, north of the former main route of the San'yōdō highway running along the coast of the Seto Inland Sea with the San'in region on the Sea of Japan. This route is now Hyōgo Prefectural Road No. 5, whereas the modern San'yōdō highway and train tracks are located further south.

The first fortification was built at this site sometime in the Kamakura period by the local Uryū clan. In 1333 Akamatsu clan under Akamatsu Norimura (1277-1350) the clan rose to prominence by siding with Emperor Go-Daigo during the Kenmu restoration to overthrow the Kamakura shogunate. Akamatsu Norimura drove the Hōjō clan from Kyoto; however, afterwards he received scant rewards from Emperor Go-Daigo for his efforts, and was even relieved of his title of shugo of Harima Province. Akamatsu Norimura switched his fealty to Ashikaga Takauji and the new Muromachi shogunate. He was given the castle by Ashikaga Takauji as a reward for his rear-guard actions in assisting Takauji's escape from Kyoto to raise an army in Kyushu. The castle withstood a siege by the armies of Emperor Go-Daigo led by Nitta Yoshisada for over 50 days. The Akamatsu clan became one of the most powerful clans in the Muromachi Shogunate, ruling most of the Sanyo region, but its power became a political threat to the shogunate. In the late Muromachi period. Shogun Ashikaga Yoshinori attempted to deprive the clan of much of its territory to increase his own authority. Akamatsu Mitsusuke assassinated Ashikaga Yoshinori at a banquet in Kyoto, but his revolt was ultimately unsuccessful and the clan lost much of its territory. Akamatsu Masanori (1455-1496) recovered one of the imperial regalia held by the Southern Court and was rewarded by the grateful Northern Court with half of Kaga Province, which marked the start of a revival of the clan. During the Ōnin War, as much of the former Akamatsu territory was given to the Yamana clan, the Akamatsu supported their rivals, the Hosokawa clan and captured Bizen, Minamsaka and most of Harima Province. Akamatsu Masanori constructed Okishio Castle in a more central location to rule these territories and abandoned the clan's former stronghold of Shirahata Castle.

However, the clan was beset by internal divisions and after the death of Akamatsu Masanori was gradually eclipsed by their rivals, the Amago clan from Izumo Province and their own main retainers, the Uragami and Bessho clans. The Uragami overthrew the Akamatsu at Kanjōsan Castle around 1521, and ruled the surrounding area, switching allegiance frequently between the Amago clan and the Mōri clan, and later allied with Oda Nobunaga. In 1575, the castle was seized by Ukita Naoie. By assisting Hashiba Hideyoshi in his campaign against the Mōri, the Ukita clan emerged as rulers of Bitchu, Bizen and Mimasaka Province, and Kanjōsan Castle formers its eastern border fortification, The Ukita clan considerably reconstructed and expanded the castle around that time.

However, in the Battle of Sekigahara, the clan sided with the losing Western Army and was deprived of its domains by the victorious Tokugawa Ieyasu. Kanjōsan Castle was abolished shortly thereafter. All that remains now are some remnants of stone walls. The ruins are accessible via a hiking course.

== Gallery ==
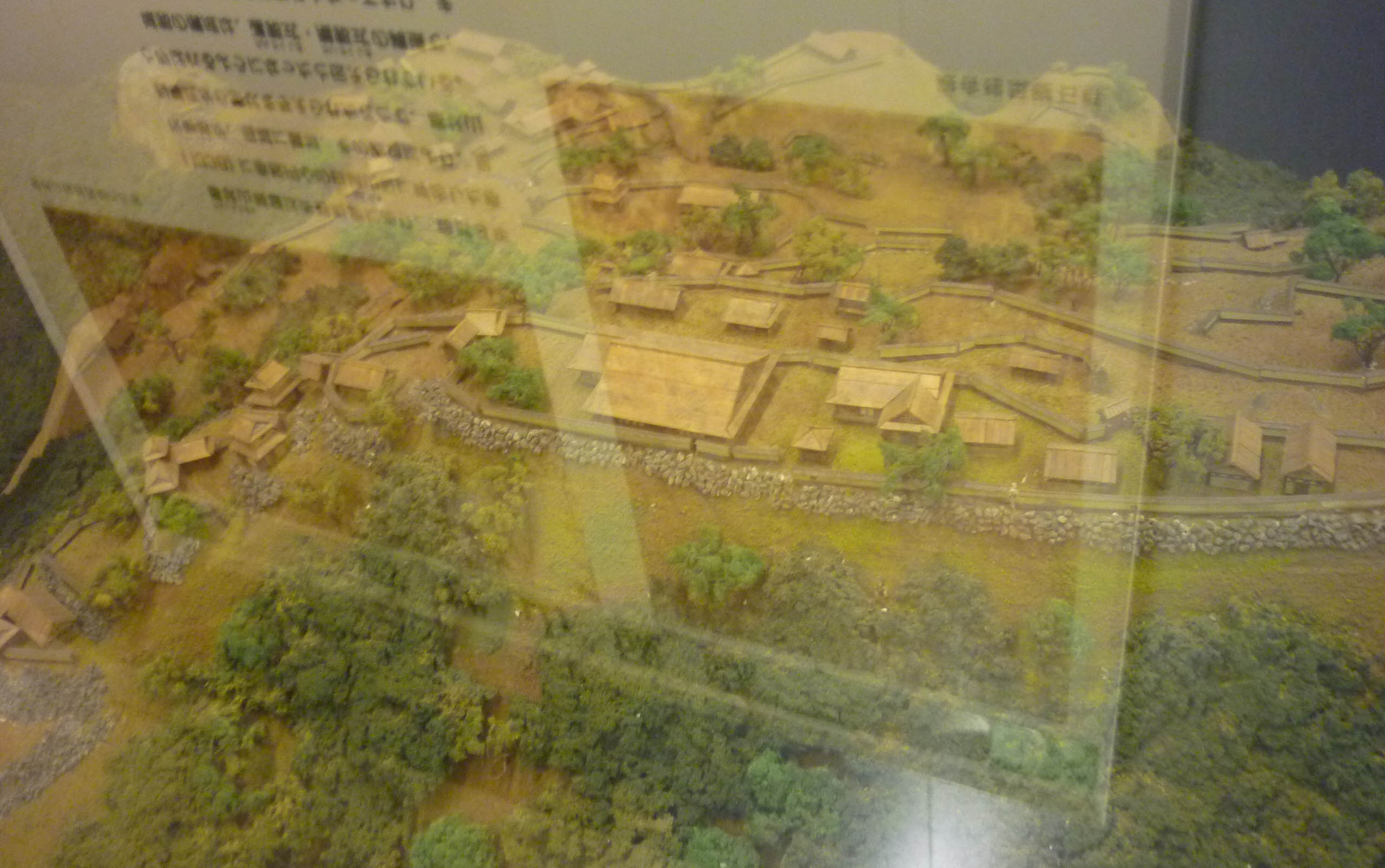
Diorama showing the castle

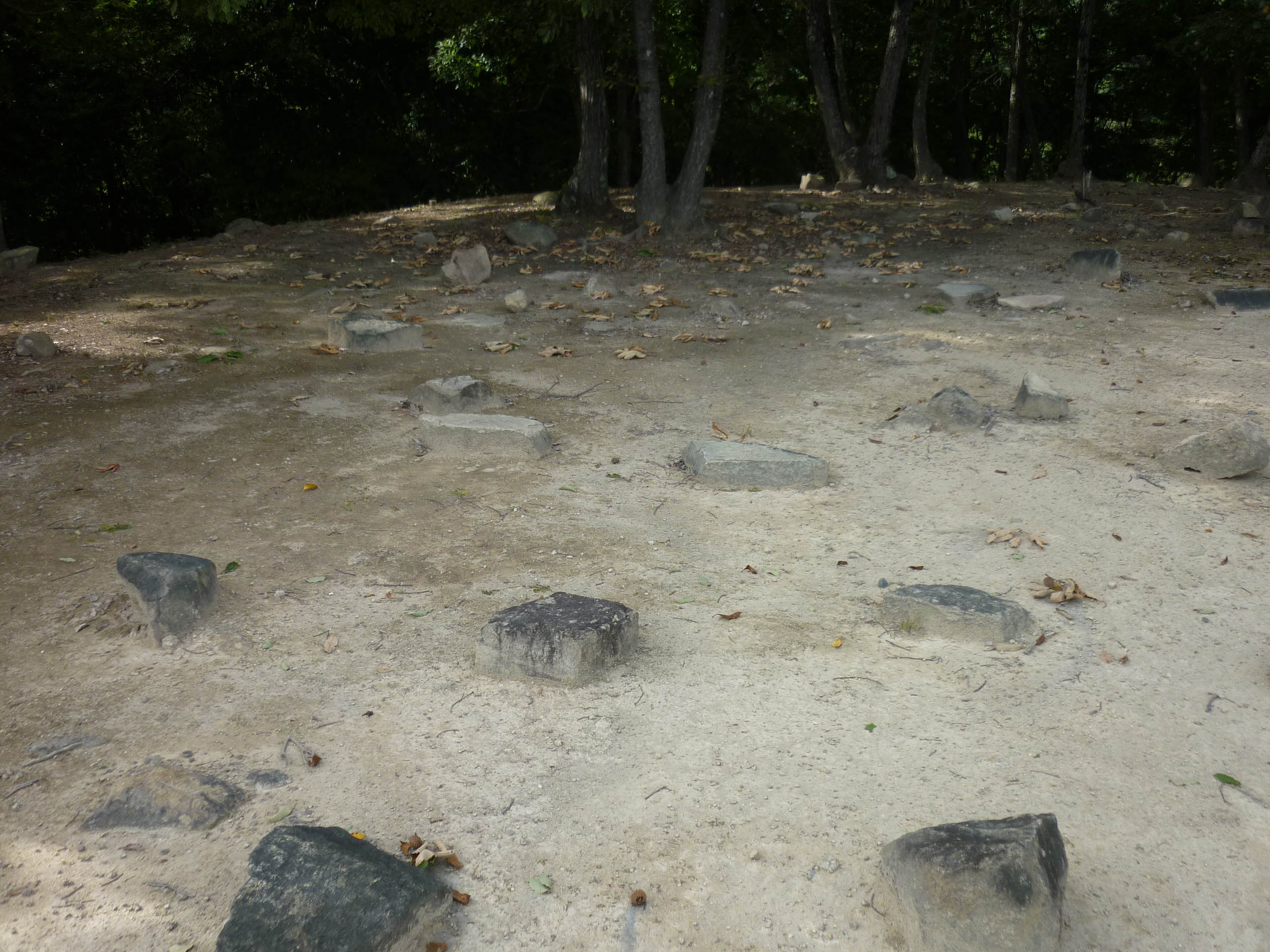
Foundation stones of a structure

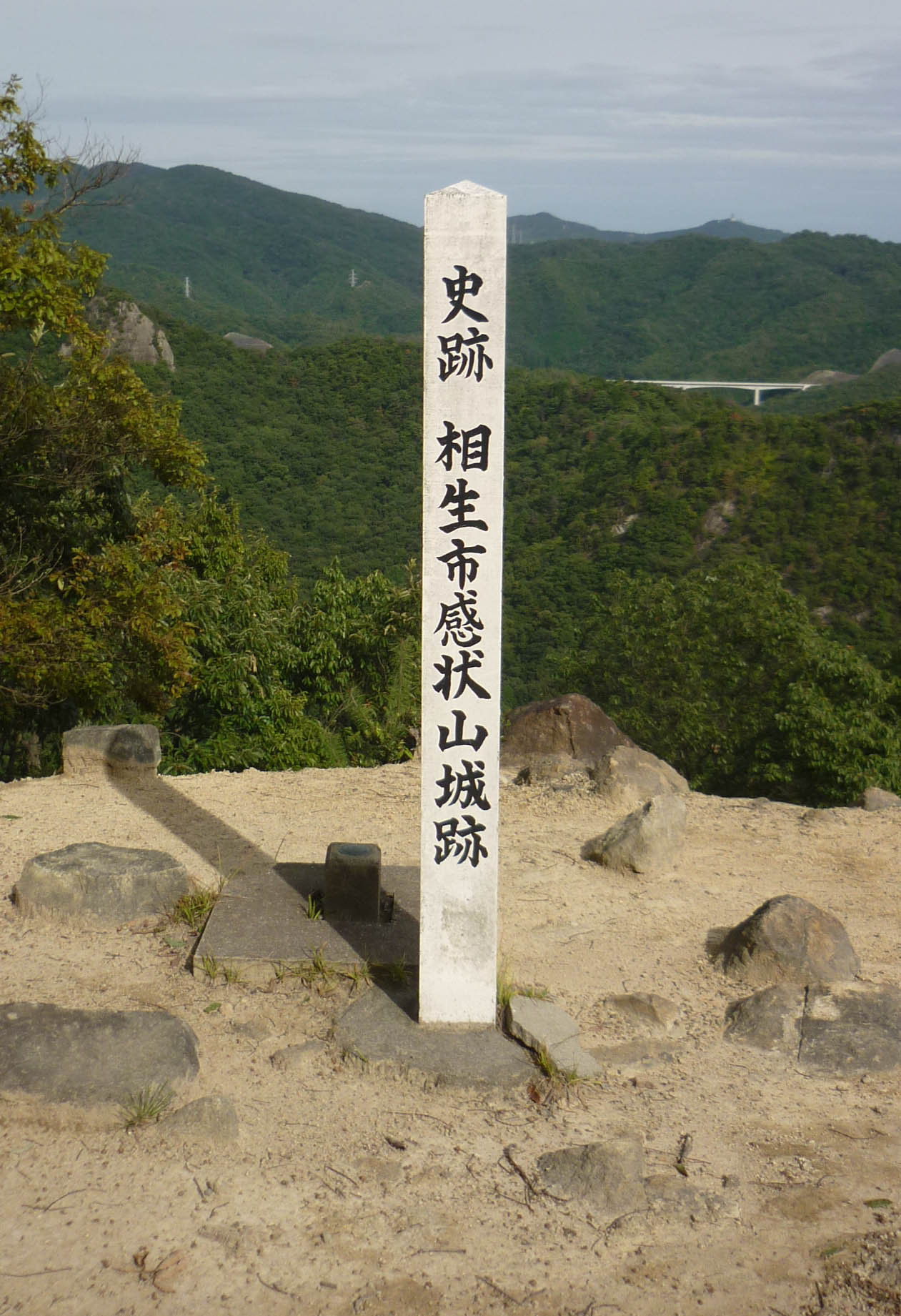
Site of the central Bailey

== See also ==
- List of Historic Sites of Japan (Hyōgo)
