= Okishio Castle =

Castle in Hyōgo, Japan

Okioshio Castle
- 置塩城
- Himeji, Hyōgo Prefecture, Japan
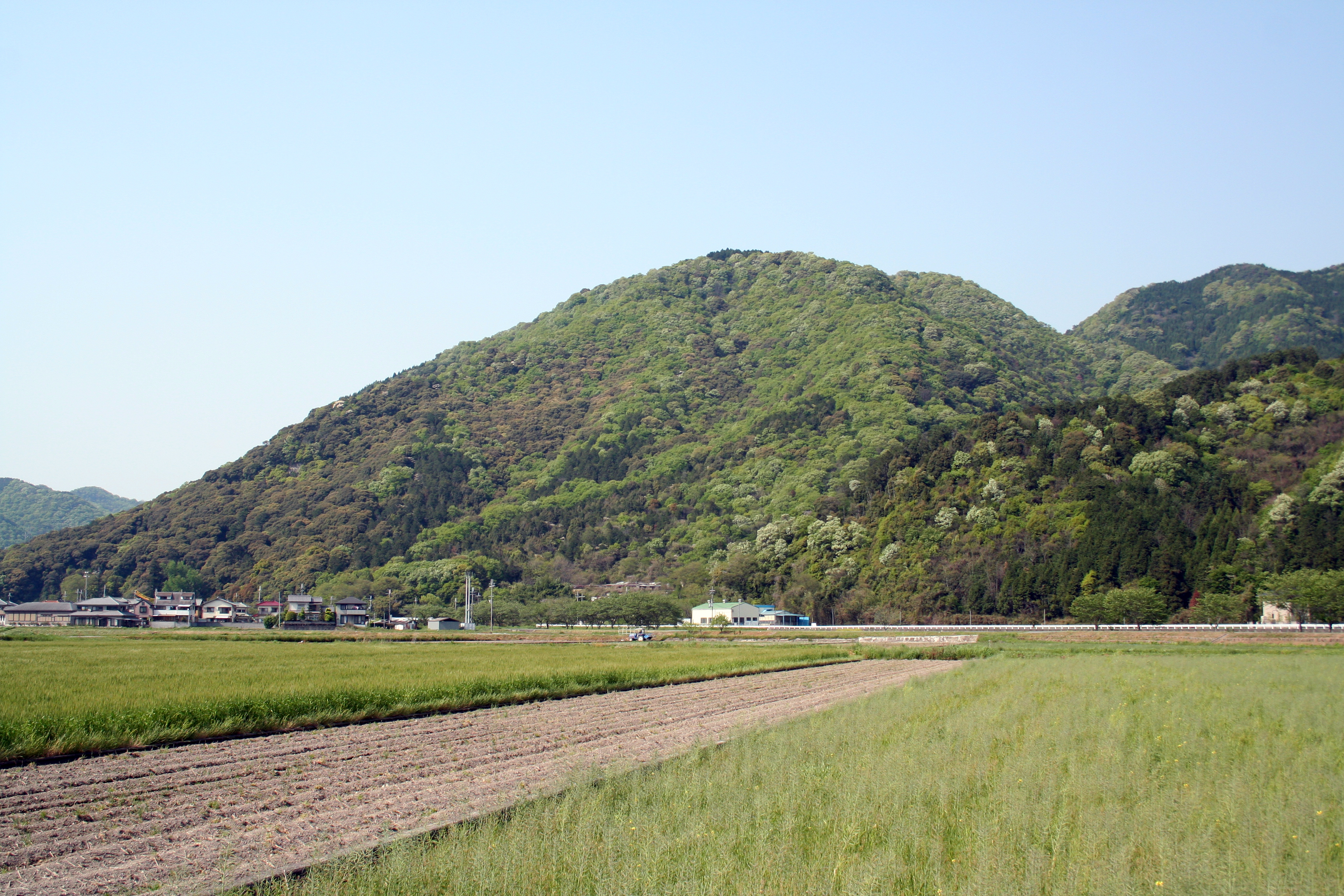
- Okioshio Castle

Site information
- Type: Yamajiro-style castle
- Owner: Akamatsu clan
- Condition: ruins

Location
- Okioshio Castle Okioshio Castle (Japan)
- Coordinates: 34°55′21.598″N 134°40′52.11″E

Site history
- Built: 1469
- Built by: Akamatsu Masanori
- Demolished: 1581

Okioshio Castle (置塩城, Okioshio-jō) is the remains of a Muromachi period Japanese castle structure located in the city of Himeji, Hyōgo Prefecture, Japan. Its ruins have been protected as a National Historic Site as one of the Remains of Akamatsu-shi Castles, combining both Shirahata Castle and Kanjōsan Castle, since 1996. It is also referred to as "Ojio Castle" after an alternative pronunciation of the kanji in its name.

== Overview ==
Okioshio Castle is located on the 370-meter Mount Ojioyama, north of the center of Himeji city. The site is in the middle of a narrow valley of Yumesakigawa River, which is a crossroads connecting the two main routes of the San'yōdō highway running along the coast of the Seto Inland Sea with the San'in region on the Sea of Japan.

The first fortification was built at this site by the Akamatsu clan in the middle of the 15th century. A minor clan of Harima Province, under Akamatsu Norimura (1277-1350) the clan rose to prominence during the Kamakura period serving the Rokuhara Tandai, and sided with Emperor Go-Daigo during the Kenmu restoration to overthrow the Kamakura shogunate. Akamatsu Norimura drove the Hōjō clan from Kyoto; however, afterwards he received scant rewards from Emperor Go-Daigo for his efforts, and was even relieved of his title of shugo of Harima Province. Akamatsu Norimura switched his fealty to Ashikaga Takauji and the new Muromachi shogunate. The clan's prosperity declined in the late Muromachi period. Shogun Ashikaga Yoshinori attempted to deprive the clan of much of its territory to increase his own authority. Akamatsu Mitsusuke assassinated Ashikaga Yoshinori at a banquet in Kyoto, but his revolt was ultimately unsuccessful and the clan lost much of its territory. Akamatsu Masanori (1455-1496) recovered one of the imperial regalia held by the Southern Court and was rewarded by the grateful Northern Court with half of Kaga Province, which marked the start of a revival of the clan. During the Ōnin War, as much of the former Akamatsu territory was given to the Yamana clan, the Akamatsu supporter their rivals, the Hosokawa clan and captured Bizen, Minamsaka and most of Harima Province. Akamatsu Masanori constructed Oishio Castle in a more central location to rule these territories and abandoned the clan's former stronghold of Shirohata Castle.

However, the clan was beset by internal divisions, and after the death of Akamatsu Masanori was gradually eclipsed by their rivals, the Amago clan from Izumo Province and their own main retainers, the Uragami and Bessho clans. In the Sengoku period, the clan submitted to Hashiba Hideyoshi, and much of Okishio Castle was demolished and its stone walls were used to construct parts of Himeji Castle. The Akamatsu clan survived as a minor retainer of the Toyotomi, with their stronghold at Tatsuno Castle, but in the Battle of Sekigahara, the supported the losing Eastern Army loyal to the Toyotomi clan and were destroyed.

Okishio Castle was used by the five generations of the Akamatsu following Akamatsu Masanori. The castle extended along a ridge covering an area of 600 meters east-to-west and 400 meters north-to-south. With around 70 enclosures, it was one of the biggest castle sites in Harima. At an elevation of 300 meters, it was necessary to climb up a steep and winding road with a length of over 1.8 kilometers to reach the inner Bailey at the summit. This central area of the castle consisted of three layers of terraces and had a front gate and front side slopes protected by stone walls. Other than this, stones of broken stone walls spread over the whole area, and a line of stones partially remains.

Nothing now remains of any structures, but numerous terraces remains over the hilltop area and archaeological excavations have found the foundations of towers in the central enclosure and residential structures in other enclosures.

== Gallery ==
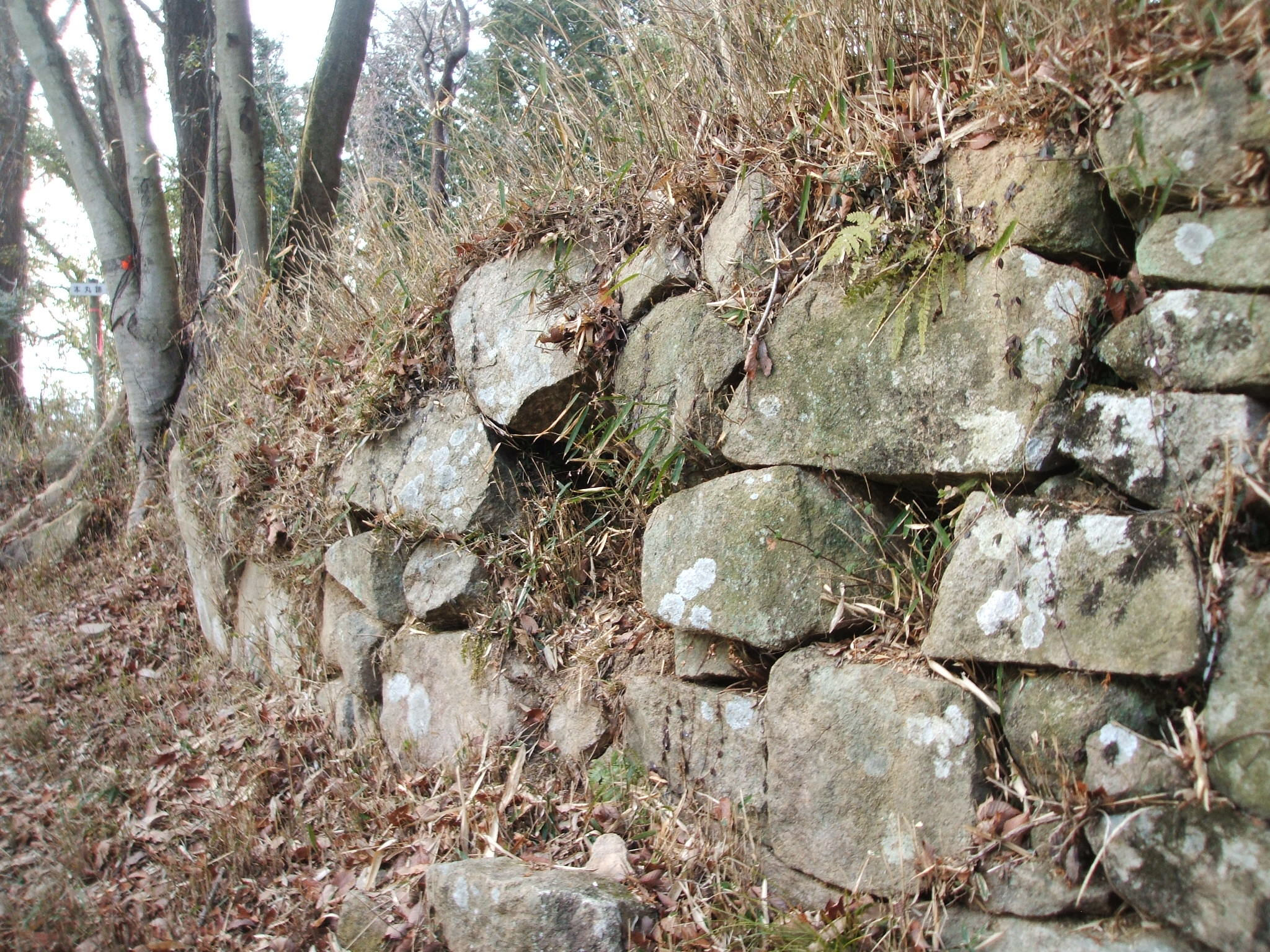
Remnants of Stone walls of the Ni-no-maru Enclosure

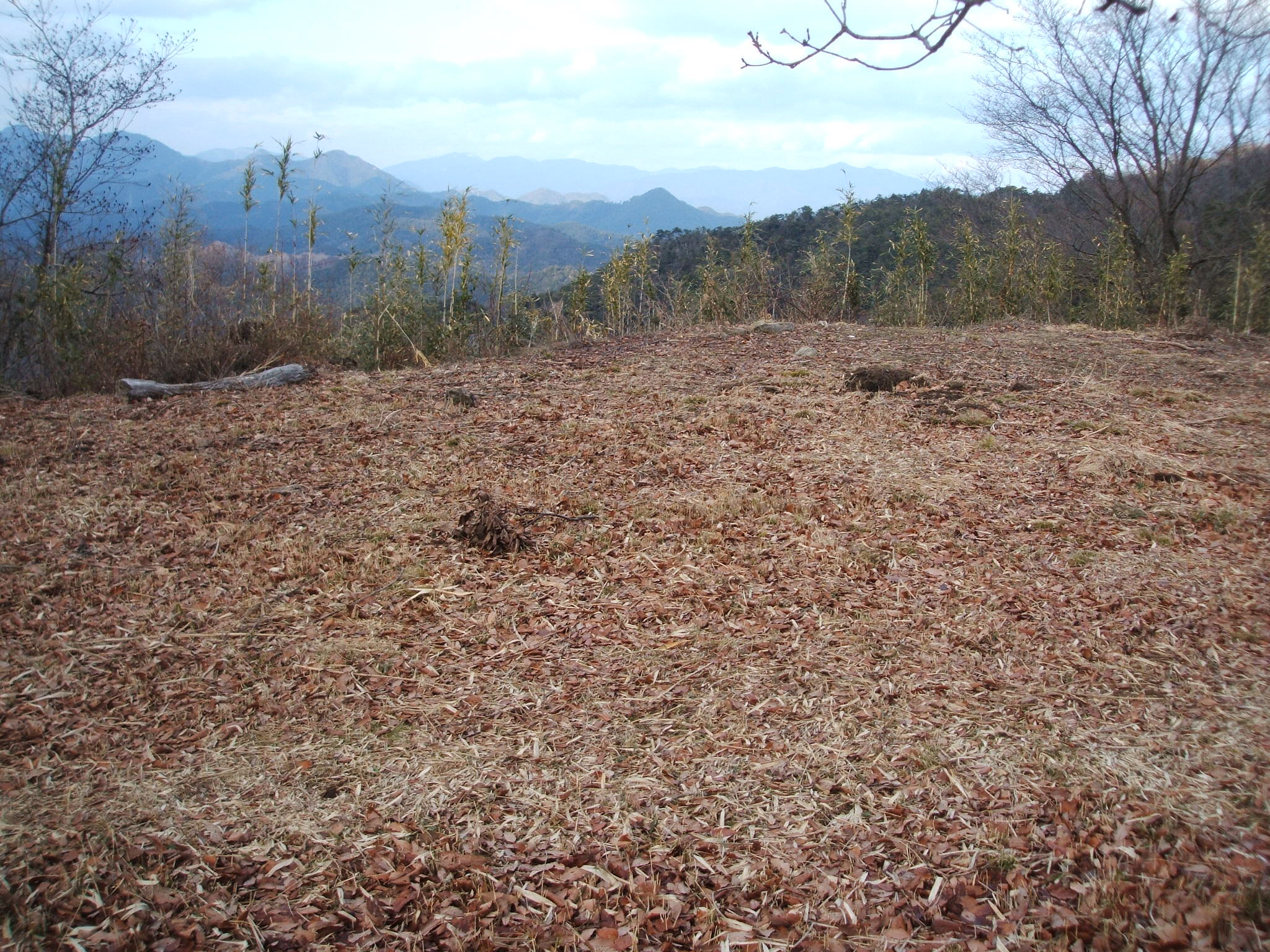
Site of the Honmaru Enclosure

== See also ==
- List of Historic Sites of Japan (Hyōgo)
