= Kamigōri =

Kamigōri 上郡町
- Town
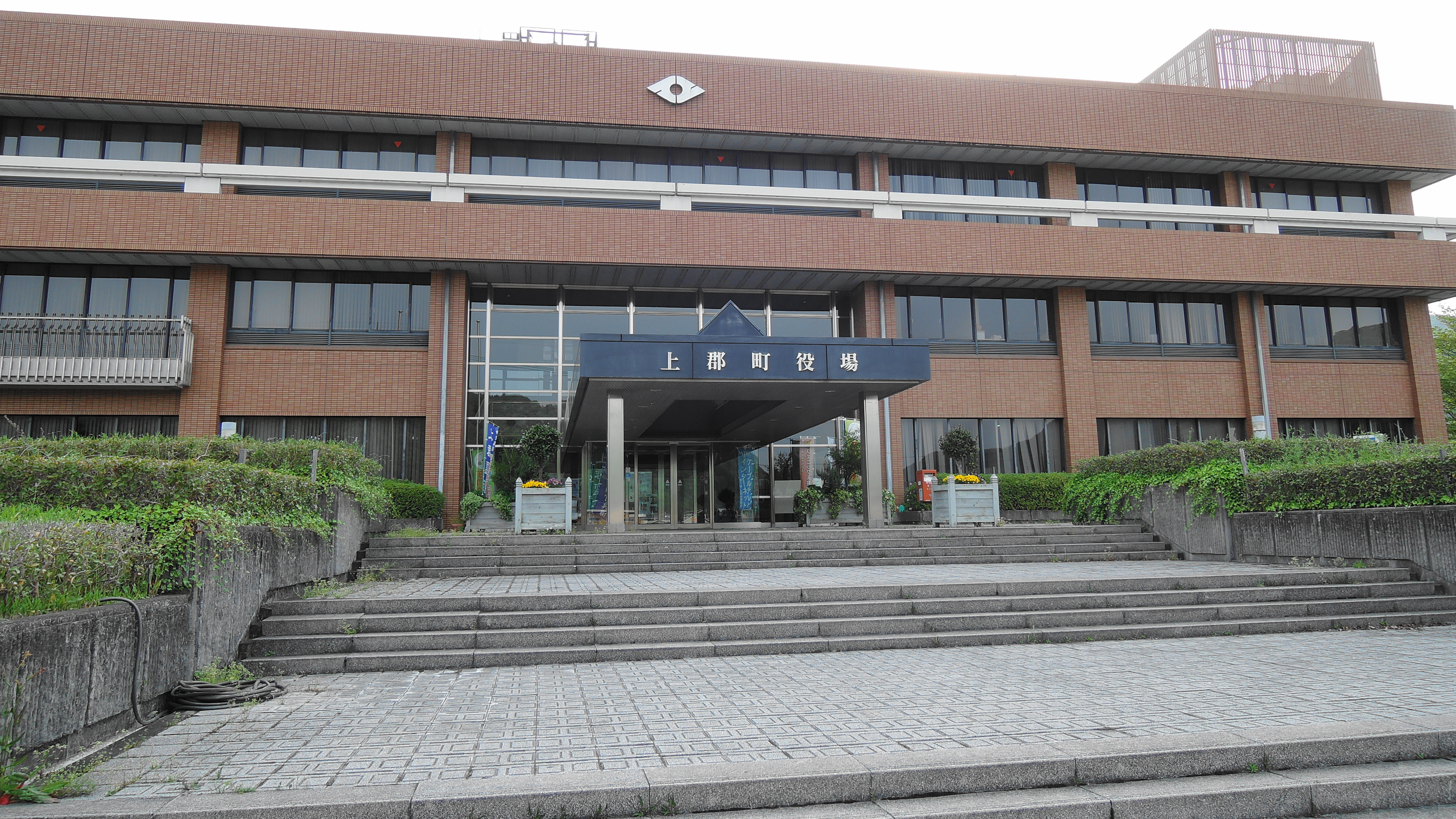

- Flag Emblem

- Location of Kamigōri in Hyōgo Prefecture

- Location in Japan
- Coordinates: 34°52′N 134°21′E
- Country: Japan
- Region: Kansai
- Prefecture: Hyōgo
- District: Akō

Government
  - Mayor: Yutaka Tōyama

Area
  - Total: 150.26 km^{2} (58.02 sq mi)

Population (March 1, 2022)
  - Total: 14,179
  - Density: 94.363/km^{2} (244.40/sq mi)
- Time zone: UTC+09:00 (JST)
- City hall address: 278 Daimochi, Kamigori-chō, Akō-gun, Hyōgo-ken 678-1292
- Climate: Cfa
- Website: Official website
- Symbols
- Flower: Dahlia
- Tree: Camellia japonica

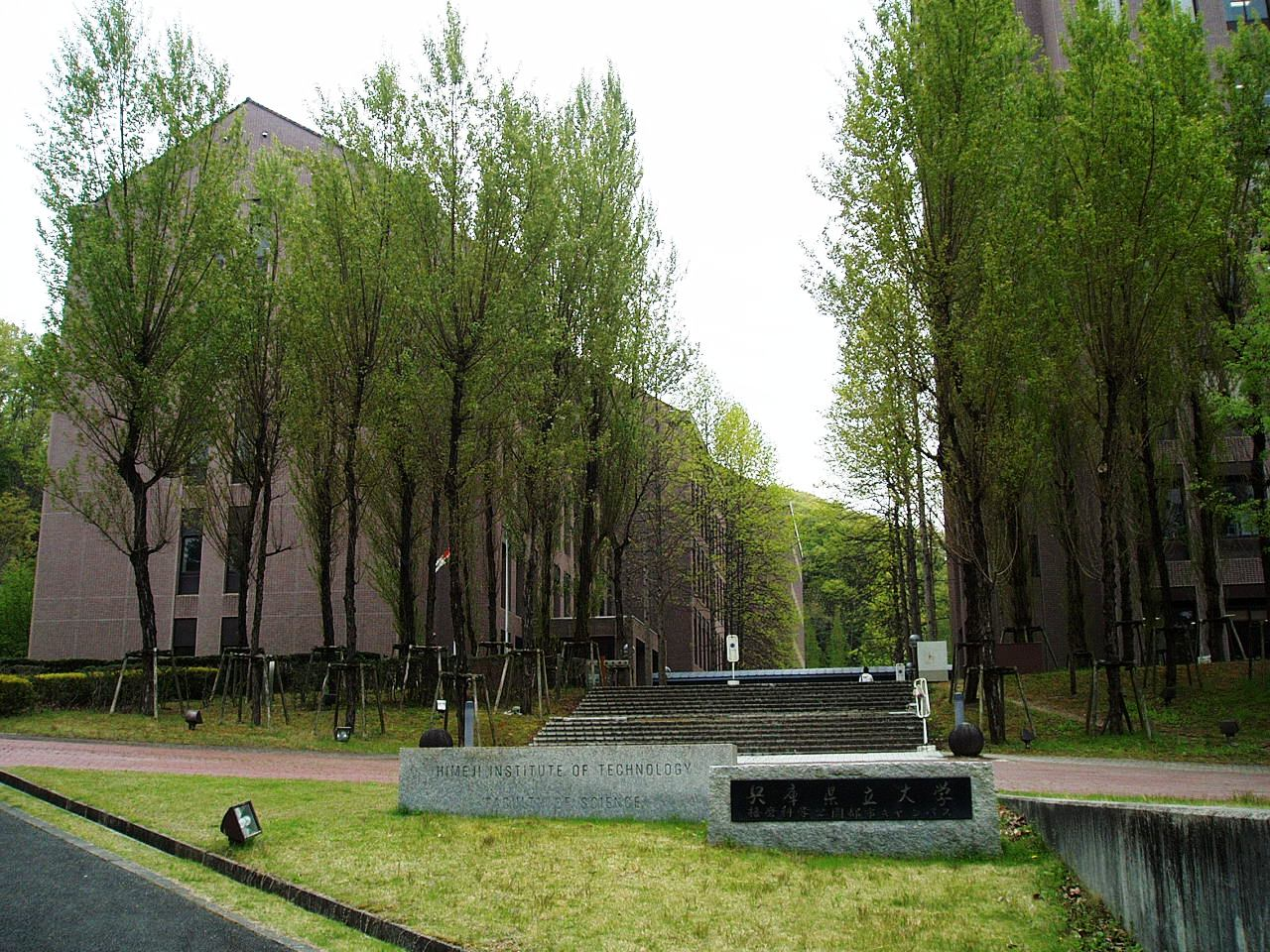
University of Hyogo Kamigōri campus

View of Kamigōri, 2025

Kamigōri (上郡町, Kamigōri-chō) is a town located in Akō District, Hyōgo Prefecture, Japan. As of 1 March 2022, the town had an estimated population of 14,179 in 6426 households and a population density of 94 persons per km^{2}. The total area of the town is 150.26 square kilometres (58.02 sq mi).

== Geography ==
Kamigōri is located in the southwestern corner of Hyōgo Prefecture.

=== Neighboring municipalities ===
Hyōgo Prefecture

- Aioi
- Akō
- Sayō
- Tatsuno

Okayama Prefecture

- Bizen

=== Climate ===
Kamigōri has a humid subtropical climate (Köppen climate classification Cfa) with hot summers and cool to cold winters. Precipitation is significantly higher in summer than in winter, though on the whole lower than most parts of Honshū, and there is no significant snowfall. The average annual temperature in Kamigōri is 14.6 °C (58.3 °F). The average annual rainfall is 1,302.2 mm (51.27 in) with July as the wettest month. The temperatures are highest on average in August, at around 26.8 °C (80.2 °F), and lowest in January, at around 3.2 °C (37.8 °F). The highest temperature ever recorded in Kamigōri was 38.0 °C (100.4 °F) on 2 August 2026; the coldest temperature ever recorded was −10.3 °C (13.5 °F) on 9 January 2021.

Climate data for Kamigōri (1991−2020 normals, extremes 1978−present)
Month	Jan	Feb	Mar	Apr	May	Jun	Jul	Aug	Sep	Oct	Nov	Dec	Year
Record high °C (°F)	19.4 (66.9)	21.9 (71.4)	25.3 (77.5)	29.6 (85.3)	32.8 (91.0)	35.0 (95.0)	37.1 (98.8)	38.0 (100.4)	36.0 (96.8)	30.8 (87.4)	25.4 (77.7)	20.1 (68.2)	38.0 (100.4)
Mean daily maximum °C (°F)	9.1 (48.4)	10.2 (50.4)	13.8 (56.8)	19.5 (67.1)	24.3 (75.7)	27.2 (81.0)	30.7 (87.3)	32.4 (90.3)	28.4 (83.1)	22.9 (73.2)	17.0 (62.6)	11.4 (52.5)	20.6 (69.0)
Daily mean °C (°F)	3.2 (37.8)	4.0 (39.2)	7.4 (45.3)	12.8 (55.0)	17.9 (64.2)	22.0 (71.6)	25.9 (78.6)	26.8 (80.2)	22.7 (72.9)	16.5 (61.7)	10.5 (50.9)	5.3 (41.5)	14.6 (58.2)
Mean daily minimum °C (°F)	−1.6 (29.1)	−1.2 (29.8)	1.4 (34.5)	6.3 (43.3)	11.9 (53.4)	17.6 (63.7)	22.2 (72.0)	22.8 (73.0)	18.4 (65.1)	11.7 (53.1)	5.5 (41.9)	0.4 (32.7)	9.6 (49.3)
Record low °C (°F)	−10.3 (13.5)	−8.6 (16.5)	−6.8 (19.8)	−3.2 (26.2)	1.5 (34.7)	7.8 (46.0)	14.3 (57.7)	15.1 (59.2)	6.3 (43.3)	1.0 (33.8)	−3.3 (26.1)	−7.6 (18.3)	−10.3 (13.5)
Average precipitation mm (inches)	37.5 (1.48)	48.0 (1.89)	91.6 (3.61)	102.4 (4.03)	135.8 (5.35)	172.4 (6.79)	201.4 (7.93)	120.1 (4.73)	177.9 (7.00)	108.1 (4.26)	58.0 (2.28)	49.1 (1.93)	1,302.2 (51.27)
Average precipitation days (≥ 1.0 mm)	5.4	6.4	8.9	9.6	9.7	11.5	11.4	8.2	9.6	8.1	5.9	5.5	100.2
Mean monthly sunshine hours	142.1	140.3	177.2	193.0	198.0	145.6	150.8	203.1	157.4	170.0	153.9	146.9	1,984.7
Source: Japan Meteorological Agency

=== Demographics ===
Per Japanese census data, the population of Kamigōri in 2020 is 13,879 people. Kamigōri has been conducting censuses since 1950.

Historical population
Year	Pop.	±%
1950	19,959	—
1955	19,000	−4.8%
1960	17,798	−6.3%
1965	17,153	−3.6%
1970	16,902	−1.5%
1975	17,448	+3.2%
1980	18,388	+5.4%
1985	18,900	+2.8%
1990	18,781	−0.6%
1995	18,849	+0.4%
2000	18,419	−2.3%
2005	17,603	−4.4%
2010	16,634	−5.5%
2015	15,224	−8.5%
2020	13,879	−8.8%
Kamigōri population statistics

== History ==
The area of the modern town of Kamigōri was within ancient Harima Province and was the base of the Akamatsu clan during the Muromachi period. In the Edo Period, it was divided between Amagasaki Domain and tenryō territory under direct administration of the Tokugawa shogunate. Following the Meiji restoration, the village of Kamigōri was created within Akō District, Hyōgo. It was raised town status on April 1, 1913. On March 15, 1955, Kamigōri expanded by annexing the neighboring villages of Takata, Kurai, and Funasaka.

== Government ==
Kamigōri has a mayor-council form of government with a directly elected mayor and a unicameral town council of 10 members. Kamigōri, together with the city of Akō, contributes one member to the Hyogo Prefectural Assembly. In terms of national politics, the town is part of Hyōgo 12th district of the lower house of the Diet of Japan.

== Economy ==
The economy of Kamigōri is based on agriculture and light manufacturing. The town is increasingly become a commuter town for nearby Himeji.

== Education ==
Kamigōri has three public elementary schools and two public middle schools operated by the town government and two public high schools operated by the Hyōgo Prefectural Department of Education. University of Hyogo has a campus in Kamigōri.

== Transportation ==
=== Railway ===
Chizu Express - Chizu Line

- Kamigōri - Kokenawa - Kōnohara-Enshin

JR West – San'yo Main Line

- Kamigōri

=== Highway ===
- National Route 2
- National Route 373

== Local attractions ==
- San'yōdō Yamanoumaya site, National Historic Site
- Shirahata Castle - A castle ruin, built by Akamatsu Norimura.
