= List of Ghost Stories (2000 TV series) episodes =

The cover art for the first volume of the anime series, published by Aniplex, featuring the main characters

Ghost Stories (学校の怪談, Gakkō no Kaidan), also known as Ghosts at School, is a 2000 Japanese anime series directed by Noriyuki Abe and produced by Pierrot. The 20-episode series was adapted from Tōru Tsunemitsu's eponymous novel series. The series is based around the lives of five school children—Satsuki Miyanoshita, Keiichirō Miyanoshita, Hajime Aoyama, Reo Kakinoki, and Momoko Koigakubo—who exorcise the spirits that are awakened in, and haunt their hometown as a consequence of industrialization.

Gakkō no Kaidan aired from October 22, 2000, to March 25, 2001, on Fuji Television. The episodes were later released in seven VHS and DVD compilations by Aniplex; a DVD box set was released in 2004. The series' soundtrack was also released by Aniplex in 2001. An episode titled "Am I Beautiful? Kuchisake-onna" (あたし、きれい? 口裂け女, Atashi, kirei? Kuchisake-onna) – about the ghost of a woman who was brutally murdered by her husband – was cancelled after complaints from parents of children with cleft lip and palate disorders. DVD compilations exclude the episode.

At the first Onicon, in October 2004, Matt Greenfield, the co-founder of ADV Films, announced that they had licensed the series for an English dub. Although the basic plot-line was kept intact in the English version, ADV Films' replaced the original dialogue with a more comedic version, which made references to pop culture. Five DVD volumes of the dubbed version were released from 2005 through 2006; the original Japanese track and subtitles were also included. A DVD box set, containing the full English series, went on sale in January 2008. In Asia, Animax aired the series in 2006 as Ghosts at School. The series uses only two pieces of theme music. "Grow Up" (グロウアップ, Gurō Appu) by Hysteric Blue played as the opening theme song of the show and "Sexy Sexy", by Cascade was the closing theme song.

== Background ==
Gakkō no Kaidan was adapted from the eponymous film, which was based on the novels written by Tōru Tsunemitsu. A middle school teacher by profession, Tsunemitsu started drafting the series in 1985, inspired by the stories circulating around the city. He began by listening to stories that his students told him, compiled them into a book and presented the collection to the publisher Kodansha, with some modifications to the language so that children could read and understand them. Kodansha published 9 volumes of the title from 1990 through 1997 and the work quickly became a best-seller. The anime series was produced in 2000, by Studio Pierrot, and directed by Noriyuki Abe. The series was planned by Kenji Shimizu, Ryūzō Shirakawa, and Yuji Nunokawa. The producers were Yuriko Nakamura, Hideo Katsumata, and Ken Hagino. Masaya Ōnishi designed the characters and Shigenori Takada was the art director. The sound was directed by Abe; sound effects were done by Masako Mutō, produced by Zack Promotion, and recorded at Seion Studio. The background score of the series was composed by Kaoru Wada.

== Episode list ==
No.	Title	Directed by	Written by	Original air date
1	"Tonight the Spirits Will Be Resurrected! Amanojaku"; Transliteration: "Konya rei-tachi ga yomigaeru!! Amanojaku" (Japanese: 今夜霊達が蘇る!! 天の邪鬼)	Noriyuki Abe	Hiroshi Hashimoto	October 22, 2000
Siblings Satsuki Miyanoshita and Keiichirō Miyanoshita move with their father Reiichirō Miyanoshita to their deceased mother Kayako's hometown. When their pet cat, Kaya, whom Keiichirō had taken to school hidden in his backpack, jumps out and runs into the old "haunted" school building, they decide to go in after him. There, they meet Hajime Aoyama (who Satsuki and Keiichiro already met next door since they moved), Leo Kakinoki, and Momoko Koigakubo, and after running from several ghosts they meet Amanojaku, a demon who feeds on children's fears, and as they become more scared, he grows larger and stronger. While trying to get away from Amanojaku, Satsuki finds an old diary which had belonged to her mother with notes on how to seal demons. The children exorcise Amanojaku, however, the camphor tree he should have been trapped inside had been chopped down, leaving him trapped inside Kaya.
2	"A Hand Reaches Out of the Toilet ... Akagami Aogami"; Transliteration: "Toire kara tekubi ga ... Akagami Aogami" (Japanese: トイレから手首が ... 赤紙青紙)	Shigenori Kageyama	Ryōta Yamaguchi	October 29, 2000
The next day in school, the flushes of the new school building's restrooms start malfunctioning, prompting the teachers to instruct the children to use the old school's restrooms. There, a monster, Akagami Aogami, frightens people by asking them if they want red paper or blue paper. Both options represent different terrible ways of death, "red" meaning the victim getting his blood drained out and "blue" meaning suffocation until the victim becomes blue due to asphyxiation. Hajime tries to trick the demon by answering "yellow" and opens a vortex to the spirit world instead. Satsuki seals Akagami Aogami using a jar filled with water and marked with the symbol of a Torii, rescuing Hajime in the process.
3	"Raise the Curtains! The Cursed School Arts Festival – Kutabe"; Transliteration: "Kaien!! Noroi no gakugeikai Kutabe" (Japanese: 開演!! 呪いの学芸会 くたべ)	Akihiro Enomoto	Hiroshi Hashimoto	November 12, 2000
Satsuki's class decide to stage a drama. Keita, the student playing the lead role, which sees his character get cursed by a ghost and almost killed, wants to avoid acting in the play. He is afraid because of a story he read about an actor who played a similar role and subsequently died under mysterious circumstances. He wishes for the gymnasium to catch fire so the show will be cancelled, the gym is then struck by lightning and goes on fire. The damage to the gym means the festival is moved to the old school house. He gets injured when a basketball net falls on him and Leo, as his understudy, replaces him. A kitsune-like ghost, Kutabe (くたべ), which haunts the fourth step of an old stairway near the school is behind the incidents. It has the power to make any statement or wish spoken on that step come true. The stairs are demolished by construction workers allowing Kutabe to appear on stage during the play. When Leo gets on stage and starts performing, the ghost almost overpowers him, but is sealed away by the rest of the group before it harms Leo.
4	"Requiem from the Dead – Elise"; Transliteration: "Shisha kara no rekuiemu Erīze" (Japanese: 死者からの鎮魂歌 エリーゼ)	Hiroyuki Ishidō	Akatsuki Yamatoya	November 19, 2000
The old school building is haunted by the ghost of the German composer Ludwig van Beethoven, which plays a piano and curses people through the song Für Elise, stating that they will die if they hear the song four times; he can accomplish this by making his victims hear his song through various objects, even ones that could not normally play music. Satsuki is cursed when she accidentally hears the piece while helping the music teacher move some boxes to the old building. In the end Momoko, being possessed by Kayako, seals him inside a metronome.
5	"The Bloody Sports Festival – Datto!"; Transliteration: "Chinurareta taiikusai Datto!!" (Japanese: 血塗られた体育祭 だっと!!)	Jōhei Matsuura	Hiroko Naka	November 26, 2000
While Keiichirō prepares for the race in the school's sports competition, he meets a young boy and befriends him. The boy is a ghost, known as Datto (だっと), with two distinct personalities: one of which is a boy, who can run barefoot at incredible speed; the other is a diabolic hare-like scythe demon. Ever since the boy died when he was hit by a car while training to win the same race Keiichirō is now preparing for, he slashes off and gathers legs of sprint runners. The ghost decides to prey on Keiichirō as well, but when Satsuki tells him that Keiichirō believed him to be a friend, he redeems himself and even stops his evil alter-ego from slashing off Keiichirō's legs when he was about to win the race. With the fall of his evil counterpart, Datto's spirit is freed.
6	"The Demon's Hand Splits the Door – Night of Tragedy"; Transliteration: "Tobira o saku akuma no te sangeki no yoru" (Japanese: 扉を裂く悪魔の手 惨劇の夜)	Harume Kosaka	Masashi Sogo	December 3, 2000
The children of the town are attacked by a spirit, which leaves them shaking in fear for days, while their parents are not home. The spirit Babasare (ババサレ) resembles the Grim Reaper and has the power to alter reality. It haunts children that are home alone and those who believe in and fear her. However, she cannot appear to adults or brave children (like Momoko). When she comes to Satsuki's house to attack Satsuki, Hajime, Leo, and Keiichirō, Satsuki tries to destroy her by spilling hot water on her. This stops her, but it is shown that this does not permanently stop her.
7	"The Soul-Stealing Mirror! Utsushimi"; Transliteration: "Kagami ni nusumareta tamashii!! Utsushimi" (Japanese: 鏡に盗まれた魂!! うつしみ)	Shigeki Hatakeyama	Ryōta Yamaguchi	December 10, 2000
Another ghost is let loose in the old school building, which inhabits an old mirror (うつしみ, Utsushimi). He captures people in the mirror world and replaces them with a replica who wears glasses and has no reflection. He tries to replace everybody in the town, but is sealed away by Satsuki who puts another mirror right in front of his, thus returning everything back to normal.
8	"The Circuit Connects to Hell – Demon of the Underworld"; Transliteration: "Jigoku e to tsuzuku kairo yomi no oni" (Japanese: 地獄へと続く回路 黄泉の鬼)	Akihiro Enomoto	Akatsuki Yamatoya	December 17, 2000
While searching for the internet website Yomi-net, which connects to the underworld, Leo nearly falls victim for the underworld demon hag (Datsue-ba). In the past, he used to take lost people to the boats of the Sanzu River and then force them to get into a boat and cross the river, which leads them to the underworld. His activities stopped with the installment of lights in the city, and thus he used the Yomi-net to achieve the same goal online. Satsuki and the others help Leo return by scanning him an o-fuda and telling him to wish to go back home.
9	"The Corpse that Roams in the Night – Shirotabi"; Transliteration: "Yoru o samayou shitai Shirotabi" (Japanese: 夜をさまよう死体 シロタビ)	Shigenori Kageyama	Hiroko Naka	December 24, 2000
Satsuki's school pet keeper, Mio, brings a rabbit, Shirotabi, back to life through a black magic ritual. The spell works, but with a side-effect, Shirotabi gets cursed and turns into a demon every night. Although Mio tries to stop Shirotabi, she realizes Shirotabi no longer even recognizes her. Satsuki and the others to convince Mio that Shirotabi's place should be with the dead, and Mio agrees. Mio breaks the spell, and Shirotabi is released from the curse.
10	"The Tunnel with No Exit – Anamaneki"; Transliteration: "Deguchi naki tonneru Anamaneki" (Japanese: 出口なきトンネル 穴まねき)	Harume Kosaka	Masashi Sogo	January 14, 2001
The town is haunted by the ghost of a taxi driver who died in a car accident in the cursed tunnel Anamaneki (穴まねき), filled with the restless spirits of those who died there, while trying to get home for his daughter's birthday. Since then, Anamaneki uses him to lure wanderers into his car and then bring them into the tunnel where they are attacked and deprived of their energy. The driver's soul is freed when Satsuki and the group encounter him. When Satsuki and the others are trapped in the tunnel, Kayako, through a telepathic conversation with Momoko, helps them to fight against the power of Anamaneki. They escape from it with the help of the taxi driver's ghost, after his evil side is exorcized.
11	"The Talking Mary Doll! Shadow of Terror"; Transliteration: "Hanasu Merī ningyō!! kyōfu no kage" (Japanese: 話すメリー人形!! 恐怖の影)	Shigeki Hatakeyama	Ryōta Yamaguchi	January 21, 2001
Satsuki is stalked by a ghost called Mary (メリーさん, Merī-san) which resembles a beautiful European-looking doll, asking her if she wants to play with her. Despite her innocent behavior, she is a very dangerous deity, as stated by Amanojaku. Satsuki and the others try to get rid of her by leaving her in a doll house where the toys of deceased people remain. However, she gains the power to control the other toys and make them go after Satsuki, attacking her as though playing a game of Kagome Kagome. In the end, Satsuki is saved by Mary herself, who claims Satsuki "wasn't having fun" and decides to leave her taking a tissue that Satsuki had used to clean Mary earlier. Mary wears Satsuki's tissue as a cape and fades away forever.
12	"The Nurse Who Tells Your Death – Mother's Feelings"; Transliteration: "Shi o tsugeru kangofu haha no omoi" (Japanese: 死を告げる看護婦 母の想い)	Junya Koshiba	Masashi Sogo	January 28, 2001
A mysterious nurse-like figure appears before Keiichirō, and starts haunting him. The deity, described by Satsuki's mom as some kind of Shinigami, visits a person who is near death and tells them that his or her end is close at hand so the person can talk with their loved ones for one last time. Upon hearing that she is after Keiichirō, Satsuki believes the nurse wants him for an evil purpose, due to a childhood trauma related with their mother's death. However, it is revealed the nurse only wanted to give them a letter from Satsuki's mother, which she had intended to give them before she died.
13	"The Picture that Swallows People – da Vinci"; Transliteration: "Hito o nomikomu kaiga da binchi" (Japanese: 人を飲み込む絵画 ダビンチ)	Jōhei Matsuura	Hiroshi Hashimoto	February 4, 2001
Satsuki paints a picture, which coincidentally resembles her mother's painting from a long time ago, leading the ghost of an art teacher from the old school with an obsession with the Italian artist Leonardo Da Vinci, to be set free. The ghost, also called Da Vinci (ダビンチ, Dabinchi), had gained the power to suck anything into his paintings when he died, making both humans and ghosts fear him. He was actually sealed by Satsuki's mother in the painting that portrayed the old school. Now after he was released, she was able to seal him again for the second time with the help of Satsuki who time travels to her era in Momoko's unfinished painting.
14	"The Life-Taking Psychic Photo – Railway Crossing of Evil"; Transliteration: "Inochi o ubau shinreishashin ma no fumikiri" (Japanese: 命を奪う心霊写真 魔の踏切)	Akihiro Enomoto	Ryōta Yamaguchi	February 11, 2001
One of the railway crossings in the town is haunted by the ghost of an once-normal woman called Shizuko, who was going to get married. She died by being run over by a taxi and became a yūrei spirit, haunting every taxi driver who passed the place where she died. She possesses Momoko and begins to drain her life force, until Leo stops her by finding her wedding ring and the taxi driver who killed her. Shizuko then comes after the driver and disappears taking him with her.
15	"The Devil's Spell – Rite of Darkness"; Transliteration: "Akuma no omajinai yami no gishiki" (Japanese: 悪魔のおまじない 闇の儀式)	Hiroyuki Ishidō	Akatsuki Yamatoya	February 18, 2001
Satsuki and three of her friends are taught and compelled into performing a black magic ritual that can grant their wishes, by their classmate Shinobu Matsuda. However, the spells are actually a trap for the girls to have their souls stolen by the darkness, and Shinobu in reality is the avatar of an evil deity called Yamime (闇目). In the end, Satsuki learns that Shinobu was once her mother's classmate who mysteriously disappeared. Possibly upon her death, she was forever engulfed by Yamime. Satsuki seals her by first binding her using her red string and flashing her camera's light directly at her.
16	"The Apartment That Eats People! Nest of Evil Spirits"; Transliteration: "Hito o kurau danchi! Akuryō no su" (Japanese: 人を喰らう団地!! 悪霊の巣)	Harume Kosaka	Akatsuki Yamatoya	February 25, 2001
While Satsuki's father falls ill with a mysterious fever, after working on a building's demolition, she and her friends are lured to an abandoned building by a woman, whom they think is about to commit suicide. Unbeknownst to them, it is a trick played by a powerful deity that haunts the building, called Soma (巣魔, Sōma). Soma originally lived underground, but was released with the construction of the building. Since then, it attacks and curses people who dare to enter the building, and it can control minor ghosts to lure or attract its victims. Satsuki, backed by Amanojaku and the ghost of a middle-aged man, seals him away using her psychic skills.
17	"Terror at Bloodstain Lake! Apparition in the Snow"; Transliteration: "Chizome mizuumi no kyōfu!! Yuki no bōrei" (Japanese: 血染め湖の恐怖!! 雪の亡霊)	Akira Iwanaga	Hiroko Naka	March 4, 2001
Satsuki and her friends decide to visit her cousin, Miyuki, only to learn from Yuki, a girl claiming to be Miyuki's younger sister, that Miyuki died in a snowstorm and is now haunting the family cabin. However, it is later revealed that Miyuki is alive and that Yuki is actually the ghost of a girl who had died by drowning in a lake a long time ago while waiting for her mother to return. Yuki was trying to get Miyuki to join her as a ghost for all eternity by using Satsuki and the others to chant a spell using a picture of Miyuki that is covered in blood. In the end, Yuki rests after the gang recites the chant "Go with the snow, but not the snow that is yellow," using a photo from an old newspaper.
18	"Akane of the Broadcasting Room! Voice of the Dead"; Transliteration: "Hōsōshitsu no Akane-san!! Shisha no koe" (Japanese: 放送室の茜さん!! 死者の声)	Junya Koshiba	Masashi Sogo	March 11, 2001
Satsuki's teacher asks her to take up the job of the school announcer. While doing her task, Satsuki realizes that the broadcast room is haunted by the ghost of Akane, a girl who died of a sudden heart attack during a radio show in the old school. Since then, her ghost curses all those who hear her voice and they will die at the sunset of that same day. Satsuki puts her into spiritual sleep by repeating the number four several times (in Japanese culture, "4" is an unlucky number, because "shi", the word for four, is also the word for death), with Hajime finishing the process by ringing the bell that announces the end of the radio transmission.
19 (SP)	"The Headless Horsemen! Curse of Death (Note: Listed as episode 20 in the DVD release. "SonyMusicShop" 学校の怪談･学校の怪談 7 (最終巻) (in Japanese). Sony Music Shop. Sony Music.)"; Transliteration: "Kubinashi raidā!! Shi no noroi" (Japanese: 首なしライダー!! 死の呪い)	Shigeki Hatakeyama	Hiroshi Hashimoto	August 24, 2001
The ghost of a feared motorcycle punk (首なしライダー, Kubinashi Raidā) who lost his head years ago in a road accident goes on a rampage decapitating everything that resembles a head every year, on the anniversary of his death. Satsuki and the group learn that the only way to seal him is by offering him a "new head" (or most likely a fake head) near a light and water. Satsuki tries the remedy, but learns that he is too powerful and dangerous to be defeated. Fortunately, the biker cannot attack anyone who is using a scarf, because the neck is hidden. When he sees that Satsuki and the others' have scarves wrapped around their neck, he spares them and returns to the spirit world. Also, the ghost's attack is restricted to the twenty-four hours of the day of his death's anniversary, as he was about to decapitate Satsuki when the town hall's nearby clock struck the midnight hour, forcing him to spare Satsuki's life and return to the Spirit World. Note: This episode wasn't included as part of the original episodes, but it was shown as a TV special months after the series ended.
20	"Farewell, Amanojaku"; Transliteration: "Saraba Amanojaku" (Japanese: さらば天の邪鬼)	Noriyuki Abe	Hiroshi Hashimoto	March 25, 2001
Satsuki and Keiichirō are targeted by a muscular ghost, Lord Ohma (逢魔, Ōma), a very powerful evil deity capable of controlling other ghosts even if they are sealed away and holds a grudge against their mother, Kayako Miyanoshita. Satsuki and the others learn that the only way to seal him away is to imprison him in a huge bell, once the exorcist has enough spiritual power. They decide to use the old school's bell, but since Satsuki has not developed her spiritual powers fully, Amanojaku leaves Kaya's body to fight with Ohma while Satsuki gathers power. Satsuki seals both Lord Ohma and accidentally Amanojaku as well; the latter had sacrificed himself in order for Satsuki to gather enough power to destroy Ohma forever. In the end, Satsuki states that she, Momoko, Hajime and Leo remained friends and that the entries on her mother's diary disappeared. While at her mother's service one Spring day, she goes looking for Keiichirō who left and finds him under a tree. There, they realize that Amanojaku is in spiritual sleep inside the tree and has given them their mother's favorite flowers. The final shot is of Amanojaku laughing and looking at them.
