= Hōun-ji (Kamigōri) =

Coordinates: 34°53′56″N 134°21′07″E

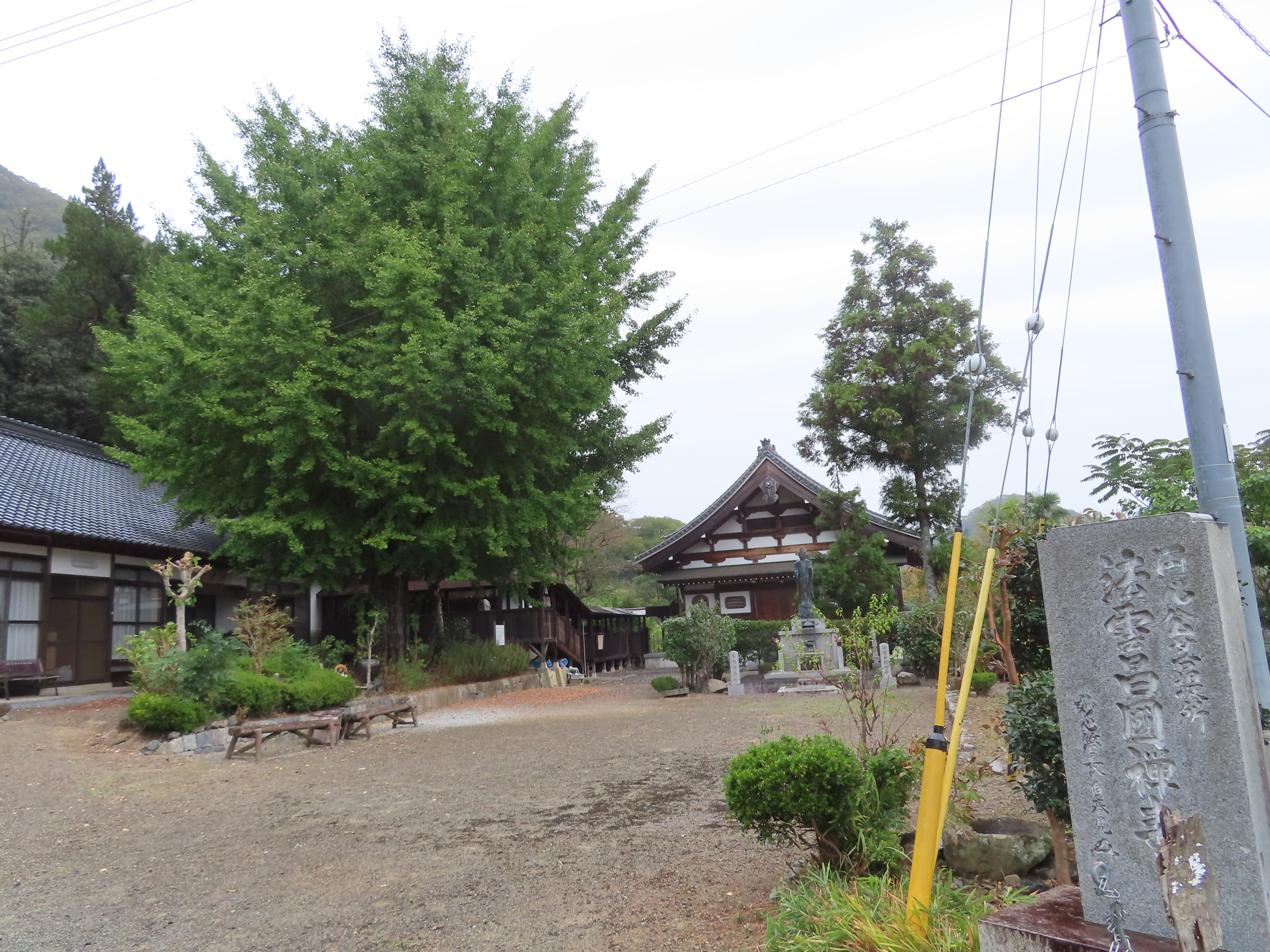

Religion
- Affiliation: Zen, Rinzai sect
- Deity: Śākyamuni (Buddha)

Location
- Location: Kamigōri, Hyogo, Japan
- Country: Japan
- Interactive map of Hōun-ji

Architecture
- Founder: Akamatsu Norimura

Hōun-ji (法雲寺) is a Rinzai Buddhist temple in Hyōgo Prefecture (formerly Harima province).

== History ==
With the patronage of the Akamatsu clan, Sesson Yūbai was able to become the founder of a number of provincial Buddhist temple-monasteries, including Hōun-ji in Harima.

Hōun-ji was ranked among the provincial jissatsu by the Muromachi shogunate, which encouraged its shugo vassals to found monasteries in their domains.

Prominent among Yūbai's followers were Akamatsu Norimura (1277-1350) and his son Akamatsu Norisuke (1314-1371).
