= Kakitsu incident =

- Part of Muromachi period
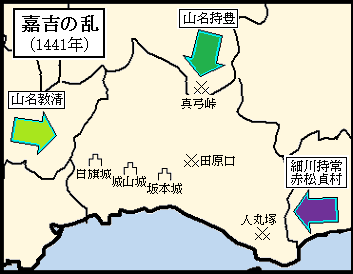
| Date | June – September 1441 |
| Location | Kyoto |
| Result | Muromachi victory |

Belligerents
| Akamatsu clan | Muromachi shogunate |

Commanders and leaders
| Akamatsu Mitsusuke †; Akamatsu Noriyasu †; Ashikaga Yoshitaka | Ashikaga Yoshinori †; Yamana Sōzen; Hosokawa Mochitsune; Akamatsu Sadamura; Akamatsu Mitsumasa |

The Kakitsu incident (嘉吉の乱) was a political and military upheaval in 1441 during the Muromachi period.
