= Hōrin-ji (Harima) =

Buddhist temple in Hyōgo Prefecture, Japan

Coordinates: 34.8231°N 134.662°E

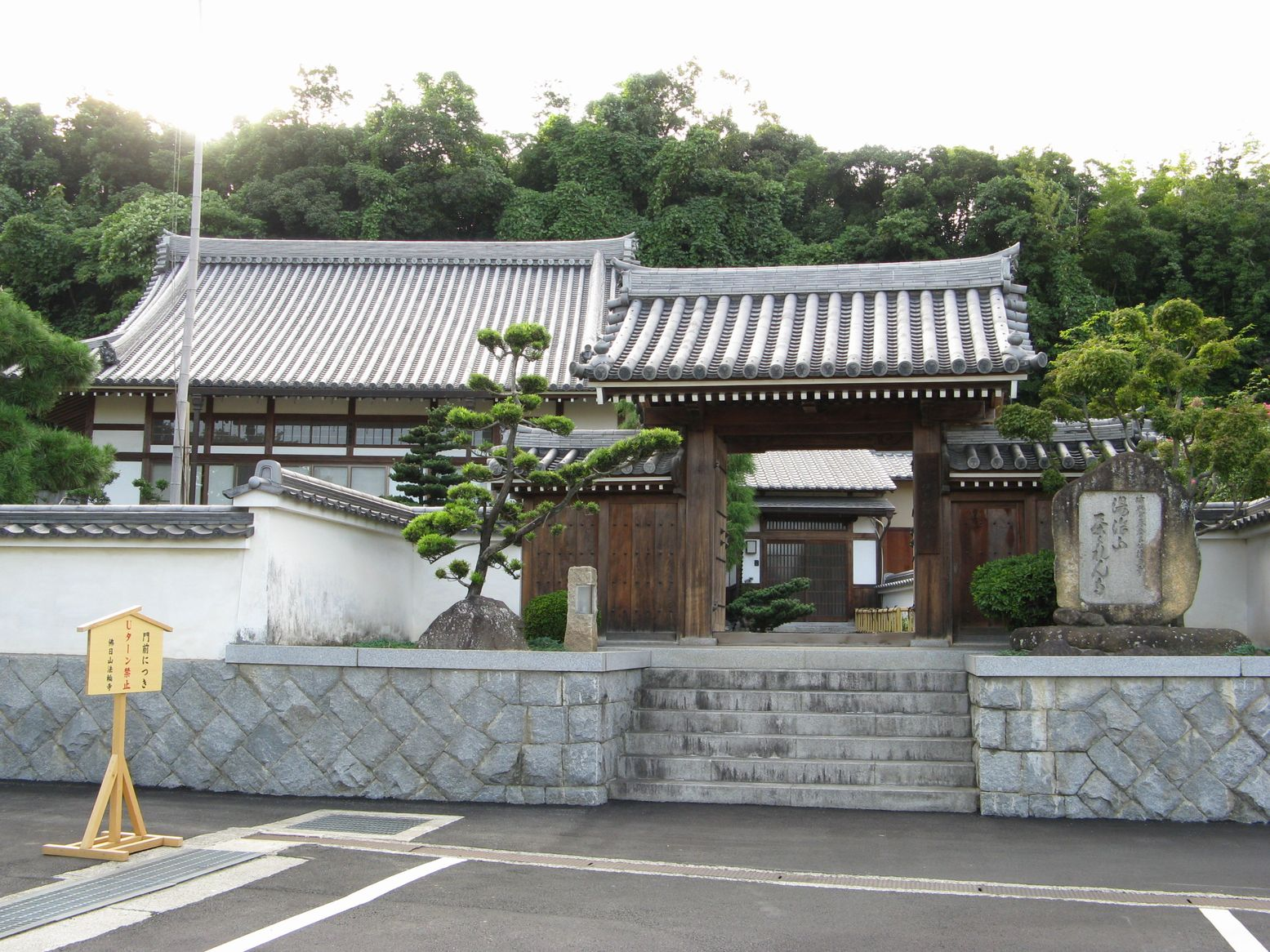

Religion
- Affiliation: Zen, Rinzai sect
- Deity: Śākyamuni (Buddha)

Location
- Location: 82, Inokuchi, Himeji, Hyogo, Japan
- Country: Japan
- Interactive map of Hōrin-ji

Architecture
- Founder: Akamatsu Norimura

Hōrin-ji (法輪寺) is a Rinzai Buddhist temple in Himeji, Hyōgo Prefecture (formerly Harima province).

== History ==
With the patronage of the Akamatsu clan, Sesson Yūbai was able to become the founder of a number of provincial Buddhist temple-monasteries, including Hōrin-ji in Harima.

Hōrin-ji was ranked among the provincial jissatsu by the Muromachi shogunate, which encouraged its shugo vassals to found monasteries in their domains.

Prominent among Yūbai's followers were Akamatsu Norimura (1277–1350) and his son Akamatsu Norisuke (1314–1371).
