= Kobe University of Commerce =

Kobe University of Commerce refers to:

- Kōbe shōgyō daigaku (神戸商業大学), 1929-1944: one of the predecessors of Kobe University.
- Kōbe shōka daigaku (神戸商科大学), 1948-2004: one of the predecessors of the University of Hyogo.
