= Sesson Yūbai =

- Title: Roshi

Personal life
- Born: 1290 Japan
- Died: 14th day of the 1st month, 1347
- Occupation: priest poet

Religious life
- Religion: Zen Buddhism
- School: Rinzai

Sesson Yūbai (雪村 友梅; 1290 – 14th day of the 1st month, 1347) was a Japanese Zen Buddhist monk of the Rinzai sect. This priest and poet who is considered "the first important poet of the Five Mountains.

== In China ==
Yūbai started studying Linji Ch'an under Chinese master Issan Ichinei in Japan and later moved to China where he studied with many other teachers. He lived in China for over twenty years (1307–1329). He was imprisoned in Chang'an during the period in which Zen Buddhists were persecuted. Many of the poems were created during or about this period survive; and they form the basis of his reputation. In Bingatshū, the collection of 242 poems includes this one:

I do not like praises and honours
Nor did I fear disdain
I just stayed away.
My mind, clear water,
My body bound and tied
For three years in Chang'an.
I sing what I feel in songs
In straight words, undecorated.

== In Japan ==
With the patronage of the Akamatsu clan, Yūbai was able to become the founder of a number of provincial Buddhist temple-monasteries in Japan, including Hōun-ji and Hōrin-ji in Harima, Hyōgo. Some of these temples were ranked among the provincial jissatsu by Muromachi shogunate, which encouraged its vasssls shugo to found monetaries in the provinces.

Prominent among Yūbai's followers were Akamatsu Norimura (1277–1350) and his son Akamatsu Norisuke (1314–1371).

== See also ==
- Buddhism in Japan
- List of Rinzai Buddhists
- Japanese Literature of the Five Mountains
