= San'yōdō Yamanoumaya site =

Nara period settlement trace in Kamigōri, Japan

San'yōdō Yamanoumaya ato
- 山陽道野磨駅家跡 (Japanese)
- San'yōdō Yamanoumaya ato San'yōdō Yamanoumaya site (Japan)
- Interactive map of San'yōdō Yamanoumaya ato
- 34°50′48″N 134°19′22″E
- Periods: Nara period
- Location: Kamigōri, Hyōgo, Japan
- Region: Kansai region

Site notes
- Public access: Yes

The San'yōdō Yamanoumaya site (山陽道野磨駅家跡, San'yōdō Yamanoumaya ato) is an archaeological site with the ruins of a Nara to Heian period government facility located in the town of Kamigōri, Hyōgo Prefecture, in the Kansai region of Japan. The site was designated a National Historic Site in 2006.

== Overview ==
During the Asuka and Nara period, a system of national highways (kaidō) was established as part of the Gokishichidō administrative reforms under the Ritsuryo system to facilitate local control by a centralized system. One of the most important of these official routes was the San'yōdō which connected the capital with the critically important administrative center of Dazaifu in northern Kyushu, passing through the provinces of Harima, Mimasaka, Bizen, Bitchū, Bingo, Aki, Suō and Nagato. Along the most important of these official routes, station houses (umaya) were established at regular intervals to provide food and accommodations, as well as pack horses and bearers for traveling officials. There were nominally established at 16 kilometer intervals, but in the case of the San'yōdō were at eight kilometer intervals. This reflected not only the volume of traffic on this route, but also was necessary as this was the route used by foreign emissaries traveling between Daizaifu and the capital. It is unknown if the layout of the umaya was standardized, as almost all of the ruins of these structures have been lost over time and due to urban development, and the San'yōdō Yamanoumaya site is an almost unique intact example. From archaeological excavations, it was determined that the buildings were of buried pillar foundations, red Pilars, whitewashed walls, and had roof tiles. The structures were arranged around a "U" shape courtyard which opened to the ten-meter wide highway. The facility was operated on a hereditary basis by the Noma clan for centuries. The San'yōdō Yamanoumaya site's also of importance in that the umaya and the Noma clan are mentioned in the Heian period Konjaku Monogatarishū and also in Sei Shōnagon The Pillow Book. It is also a location featured in the Hokke Genki, an 11th century Japanese collection of Buddhist tales and folklore.

== See also ==
- List of Historic Sites of Japan (Hyōgo)
