= Ghost Stories (2000 TV series) =

2000 anime series

- Promotional Fuji Television poster
- 学校の怪談; Gakkō no Kaidan
- Genre: Original: Horror; Supernatural; ADV English version: Black comedy; Horror comedy
- Based on: School Ghost Stories by Tōru Tsunemitsu
- Written by: Hiroshi Hashimoto
- Directed by: Noriyuki Abe
- Voices of: Tomoko Kawakami; Kumi Sakuma; Takako Honda; Makoto Tsumura; Kurumi Mamiya; Ryusei Nakao
- Music by: Kaoru Wada
- Opening theme: "Grow Up" by Hysteric Blue
- Ending theme: "Sexy Sexy" by Cascade
- Country of origin: Japan
- Original language: Japanese
- No. of episodes: 20 (list of episodes)

Production
- Producers: Yuriko Nakamura; Hideo Katsumata; Ken Hagino
- Cinematography: Toshiyuki Fukushima
- Editors: Junichi Uematsu; Makiko Asano
- Production companies: Fuji Television; SPE Visual Works; Studio Pierrot

Original release
- Network: FNS (Fuji TV)
- Release: 22 October 2000 – 25 March 2001

Ghost Stories (Japanese: 学校の怪談, Hepburn: Gakkō no Kaidan; lit. 'School Ghost Stories'), is a Japanese anime television series based on the book series Ghost Stories by Tōru Tsunemitsu. Produced by Fuji Television, SPE Visual Works and Studio Pierrot, the series aired on Fuji TV and its affiliates from October 2000 to March 2003.

Sources conflict as to whether the anime's original run was successful or not, though there is evidence of it having a relatively successful run. Nevertheless, it received notoriety in the succeeding years with its official English dub, which mostly replaced the original script for the series with pop culture references and dark humor.

== Synopsis ==
Ghost Stories follows Satsuki Miyanoshita, who moves with her family to the hometown of her deceased mother. On her first day of school, Satsuki, her brother Keiichirou (a first-grader), Hajime Aoyama (their neighbor), Momoko Koigakubo (an older schoolmate), and Leo Kakinoki (a classmate and friend of Hajime's with a penchant for the paranormal) visit the abandoned school building adjacent the current school complex and discover that the building is haunted.

It is soon after revealed that Satsuki's mother was responsible for sealing several ghosts who haunted not only the school but also the town, which are now inadvertently being released due to urbanization taking place in the surrounding area. Satsuki's mother left behind a book detailing how to exorcise the ghosts once and for all. In her first confrontation, Satsuki faces a demon called Amanojaku, but in the process, he is sealed within Satsuki's pet cat, Kaya. Although Amanojaku does not want to help Satsuki at first, the danger soon threatens to envelop the town and it is left up to Satsuki, her friends, and Amanojaku to stop the ghosts. With Amanojaku's help, the friends finally are able to exorcise the ghosts.

== Characters ==
Satsuki Miyanoshita (宮ノ下 さつき, Miyanoshita Satsuki)
Voiced by: Tomoko Kawakami (Japanese); Hilary Haag (English)
Satsuki moves to the hometown of her deceased mother with her father and her little brother Keiichiro, where she finds that her mother confronted several evil entities that haunted the town, which included Amanojaku, and wrote all her supernatural experiences in a diary, which is entitled "The Ghost Journal". Satsuki is very strong, brave and determined within, but sometimes a bit moody, mostly because of Hajime's reckless behavior.
Momoko Koigakubo (恋ヶ窪 桃子, Koigakubo Momoko)
Voiced by: Kumi Sakuma (Japanese); Monica Rial (English)
Momoko is a sixth-grader and Satsuki's best friend. She seems to fear nothing, even in dangerous situations, and is very brave when it comes to helping Satsuki and the gang confront the ghosts. She also has a psychic connection with Satsuki's mother. In the ADV English dub, she is a born again Evangelical Christian from a posh family, and almost every sentence she utters contains a thinly-veiled reference to Christianity. She mentions that she was a heavy drug user and a sex addict prior to becoming a Christian.
Hajime Aoyama (青山 ハジメ, Aoyama Hajime)
Voiced by: Takako Honda (Japanese); Chris Patton (English)
Hajime is Satsuki's neighbor. He is strong and courageous but has cowardly tendencies. Despite this, he is one of the most reliable of Satsuki's friends. In the ADV English dub, Hajime is a stereotypical anime protagonist with a slightly horny streak.
Leo Kakinoki (柿ノ木 レオ, Kakinoki Reo)
Voiced by: Makoto Tsumura (Japanese); Greg Ayres (English)
Leo is Hajime's friend and has a big obsession with paranormal themes, and proclaims himself as a respected paranormal researcher. However, whenever Leo finds a clue pertaining to the existence of supernatural entities, it seems that it turns against him. Like Hajime, he tries to be brave, but most of the time shows cowardice. In the ADV English dub, he is portrayed as a dorky teenager from a Jewish family.
Keiichiro Miyanoshita (宮ノ下 敬一郎, Miyanoshita Keiichirō)
Voiced by: Kurumi Mamiya (Japanese); Christine Auten (English)
Keiichiro is Satsuki's younger brother. He is easily frightened, fooled, manipulated, and often cries, but on rare occasions shows courage in defeating the ghosts. Because of his weaknesses, he often creates situations that the other characters have to solve. He creates a special friendship with the ghost Amanojaku. In the ADV English dub, his incompetence is elevated to that of being mentally challenged. He is often referred to as having dyslexia and is seen applying to the Special Olympics. He will often respond with a non sequitur and in times of stress, his speech will turn into a childish babble. He behaves oddly and randomly bursts into laughter, tears, or squeals.
Amanojaku (天の邪鬼)
Voiced by: Ryusei Nakao (Japanese); Rob Mungle (English)
Amanojaku is a powerful entity that, long ago, was sealed by Satsuki's mother in a tree in the mountains, but was finally released from his magic prison when that tree was cut down during urbanization. However, he did not have his freedom long, as Satsuki accidentally sealed him in the body of her pet cat, Kaya. At first, Amanojaku is hostile toward the kids and takes great pleasure in seeing them in trouble, but throughout the series, he develops an attachment to them (especially Satsuki and Keiichiro) and starts helping them in giving clues and sometimes gives direct help to the kids, displaying a tsundere personality. In the ADV English dub, he retains his antagonism towards the kids and will often break the fourth wall complaining about the poor animation, lazy writing or not being paid enough.
Mr. Sakata (坂田)
Voiced by: Yutaka Aoyama (Japanese); Tommy Drake (English)
Mr. Sakata is the teacher of the class where Satsuki, Hajime, and Leo attend. Despite not believing in ghosts, he suffers as a victim of many supernatural incidents. Mr. Sakata is often possessed, cursed, and kidnapped by ghosts. A running gag in the ADV English dub has him exclaiming his hatred for an unseen teacher named Ms. Hadley.
Reiichirou Miyanoshita (宮ノ下 礼一郎, Miyanoshita Reiichirō)
Voiced by: Takehiro Murozono, Daisuke Sakaguchi (young) (Japanese); Illich Guardiola (English)
Reiichirou is Satsuki's father. He has no clue about his daughter's supernatural duties and does not believe in ghosts. In the ADV English dub, he is a largely absent and inattentive father. It is implied that he is a cross-dresser.
Kayako Miyanoshita (宮ノ下 佳耶子, Miyanoshita Kayako)
Voiced by: Kotono Mitsuishi (Japanese); Marcy Bannor (English)
Kayako is Satsuki's and Keiichiro's deceased mother. Through her diary, it is revealed that she was an avid exorcist during her childhood. She possesses Momoko two times throughout the series to aid Satsuki against the Piano Ghost and Kutabe, and once helped Satsuki and the others to escape from a powerful haunting called Anamnaneki. Her maiden name was Kamiyama. It was revealed that she is haunting The Ghost Journal that she made for Satsuki (this was proven when The Ghost Journal content disappeared after Satsuki exorcised all ghosts that she dealt with during her childhood) and assisting her through the diary or possessing Momoko. In the ADV English dub, she is bisexual.

== English release ==
Fuji TV, who owned the series's Western distribution rights, approached ADV Films to produce an English dub. Fuji TV allegedly gave the ADV Films staff very few constraints when writing the new version; the only rules were "don't change the character names (including the ghosts); don't change the way the ghosts are slain (a reference to Japanese folklore) and, finally, don't change the core meaning of each episode". Steven Foster, who directed and co-wrote the dubbed script, has disputed some of these statements:

We couldn't change the way [the ghosts were put into spiritual sleep] in the show, because [it's] animated. [...] But we didn't change the way they died. It's animated, so you couldn't. And I even said it in my book that I wrote that [not changing the names of the characters] was one of [their requirements], but I just don't remember them doing that. [...] I ended up just keeping all the names as is, because I didn't see a reason to change them. They were, I mean the names were fine.

The English dub deviates significantly from the original script. While preserving the basic plot structure and storyline, the new script revolved around topical pop-culture references, politically incorrect gags, and fourth wall breaking jokes about the original show's low animation quality, anime clichés, and poor lip-sync.

The English script was written by Foster and Lucan Duran. Sources conflict on how much of the final dub was ad-libbed (improvised). According to Foster, only certain bits and pieces of the finished product came from the additions of actors: "So when I was doing the credits, I was like, well, the cast [...] they ad-libbed a couple of lines here and there. Maybe two dozen max? [...] If that much?" Foster also stated that he credited the actors as additional writers to avoid backlash, as he had received outcry in the past for deviating from original scripts in other anime dubs. However, many of the actors have stated that the script writing was informal and improvised. Foster has responded to this, claiming that, "And if you heard any of the actors say that it was ad-libbed the whole time? They weren't lying to you, they were just doing what the company told them to do."

On the weekend of 19 August 2005, at the 2005 Otakon anime convention, ADV Films announced a North American DVD release of Ghost Stories for the following October. The original Japanese audio and literal subtitle translation are also included. Volume 1 was released on 22 October 2005.

On 28 August 2013, Discotek Media announced that they acquired the series' license and would release it in 2014 with the ADV dub and the Japanese audio with English subtitles. The complete series was released on a three-disc set on 25 March 2014. Ghost Stories and its dub were also released on the anime streaming platform RetroCrush in February 2021.

== Reception ==
The anime's original run was highly successful in terms of audience and readership ratings. According to Animedia, the series was ranked 9th out of 10 by readers as the most anticipated anime of 2000. It peaked in the magazine's top 10 anime at least twice: it was given the ninth highest audience rating of 11.8% for December 2000, and was given the seventh highest readership rating of 37.3% for episode 8. The series had an overall top audience rating of 14%, which placed it 12th out of 30 when it comes to anime (2000s era) with a rating of 11% and above.

The English-language dub has also received feedback from critics in the field. Dhruv Sharma of Screen Rant praised the characters of Ghost Stories and their developments as "well-written", though he wrote that the animation style was "a bit dated". /Film's Hoai-Tran Bui called the dubbed version of Ghost Stories the "best and worst anime dub", describing it as "raunchy, wildly inappropriate, [and] self-aware".

== See also ==
- School Ghost Stories, a film adapted from the same books that the series is based on
- List of ghost films
