= Shirahata Castle =

Castle in Hyōgo, Japan

- 白旗城
- Kamigōri, Akō, Hyōgo Prefecture, Japan
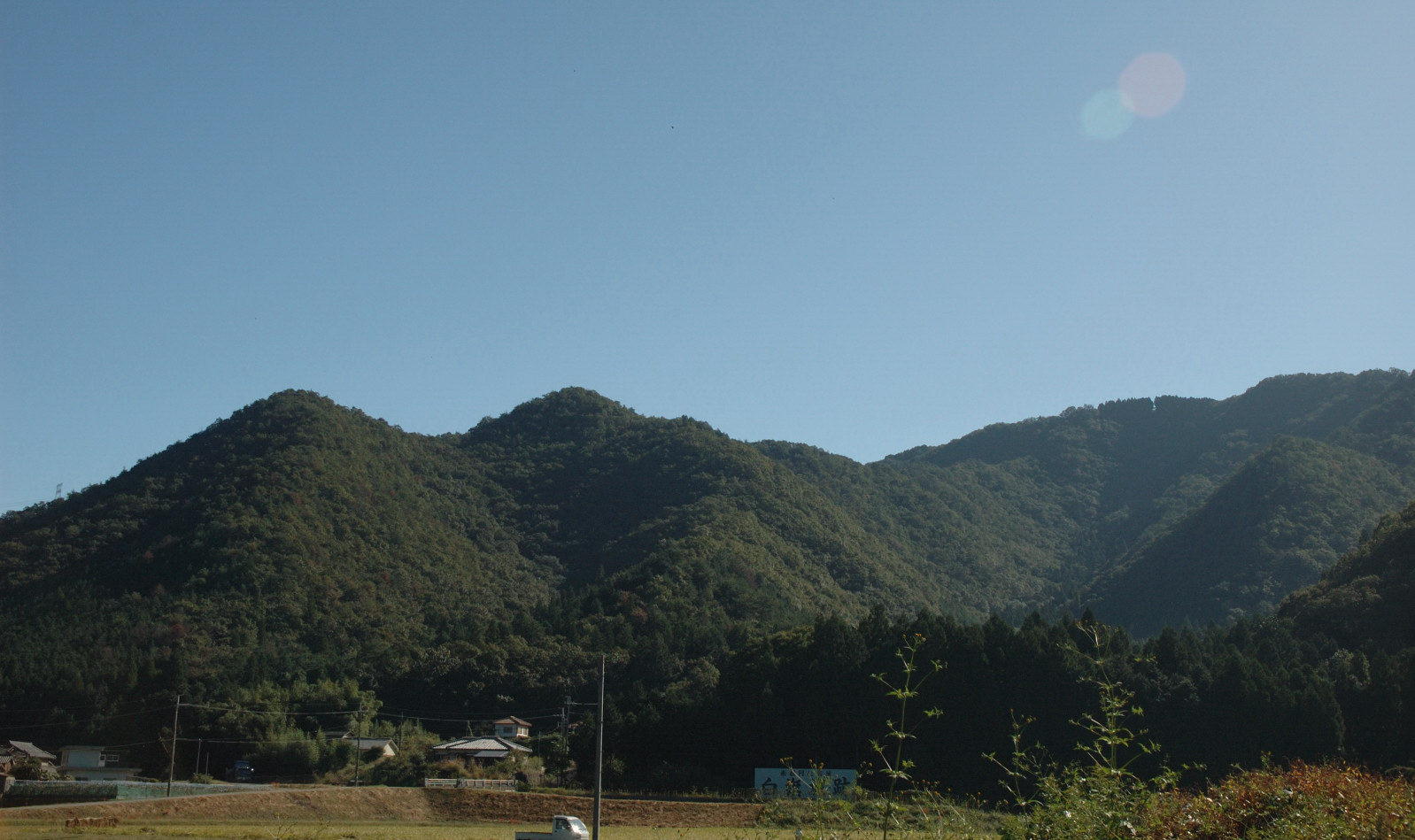
- Shirahata Castle

Site information
- Type: Yamajiro-style castle
- Owner: Akamatsu clan
- Condition: ruins

Location
- Coordinates: 34°54′30.19″N 134°22′50.64″E

Site history
- Built: 1336
- Built by: Akamatsu Enshin
- Demolished: 1520
- Events: Siege of Shirahata, Kakitsu Incident

Garrison information
- Past commanders: Akamatsu Norimura, Akamatsu Mitsusuke

Shirahata Castle (白旗城, Shirahata-jō) is the remains of a Muromachi period Japanese castle structure located in the town of Kamigōri, Akō District, Hyōgo Prefecture, Japan. Its ruins have been protected as a National Historic Site as one of the Remains of Akamatsu-shi Castles, combining both Okishio Castle and Kanjōsan Castle, since 1996.

== History ==
Shirohata Castle is located on the summit of 440-meter Mount Shirohata, on the western border of Harima Province (current Hyōgo prefecture) with Bizen Province (current Okayama Prefecture. It overlooks a narrow valley of Chikusagawa River, which flows from north to south along the border, and the San'yōdō highway, which was the main east-west conduit between Kyoto and the provinces western Japan. The area thus had great strategic importance, and a fortification was initially built at this location either in 1333 or 1335 as the main stronghold of the Akamatsu clan. The clan rose to power during the Kamakura period serving the Rokuhara Tandai, and sided with Emperor Go-Daigo during the Kenmu restoration to overthrow the Kamakura shogunate. Akamatsu Norimura drove the Hōjō clan from Kyoto; however, afterwards he received scant rewards from Emperor Go-Daigo for his efforts, and was even relieved of his title of shugo of Harima Province. Akamatsu Norimura switched his fealty to Ashikaga Takauji and the new Muromachi shogunate. Asakaga Takauji was initially unable to hold Kyoto against the counterattack by Kitabatake Akiie and Nitta Yoshisada and had to retreat as far as Kyushu to rebuild his army. The Akamatsu remained loyal to the Ashikaga, and by holding Shirohata Castle were able to provide the Ashikaga with valuable rear-guard support to enable them time to regroup.

There are two theories as to the construction of the castle. One theory is that it was built by Akamatsu Norimura in 1333 when he raised an army to overthrow the Kamakura Shogunate. The other theory is that it was built in 1335 to stop the westward advance of Nitta Yoshisada Nitta against the Ashikaga. In either case, per the Taiheiki, in 1336 the castle successfully withstood a siege of 50 days by Nitta Yoshisada. After the Battle of Minatogawa, the victorious Muromachi shogunate rewarded the Akamatsu clan with the positions of shugo of Harima and of Settsu Provinces. They later lost Settsu, but gained Bizen and Mimasaka Provinces and for a short period were one of the four major houses under the Muromachi shogunate. In 1361, Ashikaga Yoshimitsu and others who fled Kyoto during an attack by the Southern Court found refuge at Shirahata Castle.

The clan's prosperity declined in the late Muromachi period. Shogun Ashikaga Yoshinori attempted to deprive the clan of much of its territory to increase his own authority. Akamatsu Mitsusuke assassinated Ashikaga Yoshinori at a banquet in Kyoto, but his revolt was ultimately unsuccessful and the clan lost much of its territory. During the Ōnin War, the clan continued play a major role and regained some of its power, but was beset by internal divisions and gradually eclipsed by their main retainers, the Uragami and Bessho clans. Akamatsu Yoshimura launched an attack from Shirahata Castle against the Uragami in Mimasaka Province, but was killed in combat. In 1538, the Amago clan from Izumo Province sensed an opportunity with the Akamatsu clan weaken and in disarray, and invaded. Around this time, the Akamatsu relocated their seat from Shirahata Castle to Okishio Castle in central Harima, which was closer to their remaining major retainer, the Kodera clan, and Shirahata Castle was abandoned. After 1580, the clan largely disappears from history,

At present, all that remains of Shirahata Castle is the traces of long lines of enclosures on the mountainside. The castle extended on a long and narrow ridge for over 350 meters from east to west and about 850 meters from north to south The central area was at the peak, and was a roughly circular enclosure 40-meters in diameter. On the eastern slope is a flat space which might be the location of the residence, and was protected by stone walls. The stones which originally formed the pond of a Japanese garden have also been identified.

The site is a 60-minute walk from Kamigōri Station on the JR West San'in Main Line.

== See also ==
- List of Historic Sites of Japan (Hyōgo)
