= Tōshōin =

15th-century Japanese noblewoman

- 洞松院
- Born: 1460s Japan
- Other names: Akamatsu Tōshōin
- Occupations: Noble, political leader, former Buddhist nun
- Era: Sengoku period
- Known for: Acting as the power behind the Akamatsu clan and serving as guardian of Akamatsu Yoshimura; exercising political authority through official documents and land grants
- Title: De facto daimyo of the Akamatsu clan
- Spouse: Akamatsu Masanori
- Children: Ko-meshi (daughter)
- Father: Hosokawa Katsumoto
- Relatives: Hosokawa Masamoto (brother)

Tōshōin (洞松院, born in the 1460s) or Akamatsu Tōshōin was a Japanese noble who acted as the power behind the throne or de facto daimyo of the Akamatsu clan during the Sengoku period. She was the daughter of Hosokawa Katsumoto, sister of Hosokawa Masamoto, and wife of Akamatsu Masanori. Tōshōin was a de facto Daimyo who supported the Akamatsu clan as a guardian of Akamatsu Yoshimura. She took explicit control of the clan as the leader in 1521, after Yoshimura was assassinated.

== Biography ==
Tōshōin was the daughter of Hosokawa Katsumoto, the Kanrei (Shogun's Deputy) of the Muromachi Shogunate and became a Buddhist nun at Ryōan-ji Temple due to her unconventional appearance. At the behest of her younger brother, Matsumoto, she returned to secular life. On April 20, 1493 (May 5, 1493), at the age of 30, 31, or 33, she married Akamatsu Masanori, the governor of Harima Province. This marriage was made possible through the strong efforts of Uehara Motohide, a retainer of the Hosokawa clan, and Sueshi Noriharu, a retainer of the Akamatsu clan, despite Masanori being away on military campaign in Sakai at the time. A popular poem circulating in Kyoto at the time reads, "A celestial being whom I once thought of as a demon, has descended upon the shores of Sakai," signifying the marriage's unusual circumstances. Two days later, the Meio Political Incident erupted.

Tōshōin bore a daughter (Ko-meshi) with Masanori. In 1496, Masanori died, leaving no male heir. Consequently, the son of Akamatsu Masanori's collateral relative, Akamatsu Masaaki, later known as Dōsōshō Maru, became Ko-meshi's husband and assumed the name Akamatsu Yoshimura. Initially, the elderly retainer Uragami Norimune wielded significant influence over the Akamatsu clan as Yoshimura's guardian. In 1499, tensions within the Akamatsu clan erupted into the East-West Conflict (Tōzai Torihō) when Uragami Norimune's opponents, led by Uragami Murakuni, supported Akamatsu Katsunori as the head of the clan. During this turmoil, influenced by Sueshi Noriharu's advice, Tōshōin was elevated as the leader of a third faction. Ultimately, although Yoshimura retained his position as clan head, Tōshōin began issuing documents in her own name, marking the emergence of her influence.

=== Rise to Power ===
In 1502, after the death of Norimune, Tōshōin assumed the role of guardian for Yoshimura, her son-in-law, with the support of her brother Matsumoto and the Akamatsu retainers. Over the next two decades, all grants of land and exemptions within the Akamatsu clan's three provinces—Harima, Bizen, and Mimasaka—were made with Tōshōin's "Tsubone" signature and black seal, as documented in Tōshōin's Nun Seal Letters (Tōshōin Ni-in Hanjō).

In 1507, when Matsumoto was assassinated, a dispute arose over the succession for head of the Hosokawa clan between Yoshimura and Hosokawa Sumimoto. Sumimoto, allied with former Shogun Ashikaga Yoshitane, ousted Yoshimura and Ashikaga Yoshizumi from Kyoto. However, Tōshōin supported Yoshimura and sheltered Ashikaga Yoshiteru (later known as Ashikaga Yoshiharu), the legitimate heir of Yoshizumi, within the Akamatsu clan. Subsequently, Yoshimura rebelled, aligning himself with Yoshizumi and Ashikaga Yoshitsuna, and clashed with the Western daimyo Ōuchi Yoshitaka at the Battle of Funao. Following a decisive defeat at the Battle of Funaokayama, Tōshōin personally negotiated a peace settlement with Akamatsu Yoshimura.

=== Consolidation of Power ===
As Yoshimura grew older, he came to view Tōshōin's guardianship as an obstacle, leading to frequent conflicts. Consequently, Tōshōin allied with her retainer Uragami Murakuni to plot Yoshimura's removal. Ultimately, Yoshimura rebelled against them, but he was defeated and imprisoned by Uragami Murakuni twice. His son Harumasa succeeded him as clan head. In 1521, Yoshimura was assassinated by assassins sent by Murakuni. Tōshōin continued to wield de facto authority over the Akamatsu clan, along with her daughter and Murakuni, cooperating with Akamatsu Takanori, and exerting dominance over the clan's territories.

== See also ==
- List of female castellans in Japan

== Sources ==
- Akira Imatani "Study of Akamatsu Masanori and Hosokawa Toshoin" ("Yokohama City University Ronso").
- Daimon Watanabe, A Study of Akamatsu in the Sengoku Period, Iwata Shoin, 2010.
- Daimon Watanabe, The Akamatsu Clan in the Late Middle Ages: From the Perspectives of Politics, Historical Materials, and Culture, Japanese Historical Materials Research Group, 2011.
