= University of Hyogo =

Higher education institution in Hyōgo Prefecture, Japan

Coordinates: 34°40′43″N 135°10′50″E

- 兵庫県立大学
- Type: Public
- Established: 2004; 22 years ago
- President: Masayoshi Kiyohara
- Administrative staff: 555 full-time
- Students: 6,158
- Undergraduates: 5,286
- Postgraduates: 872
- Doctoral students: 172
- Location: Kobe, Hyogo, Japan
- Campus: Suburb
- Website: www.u-hyogo.ac.jp

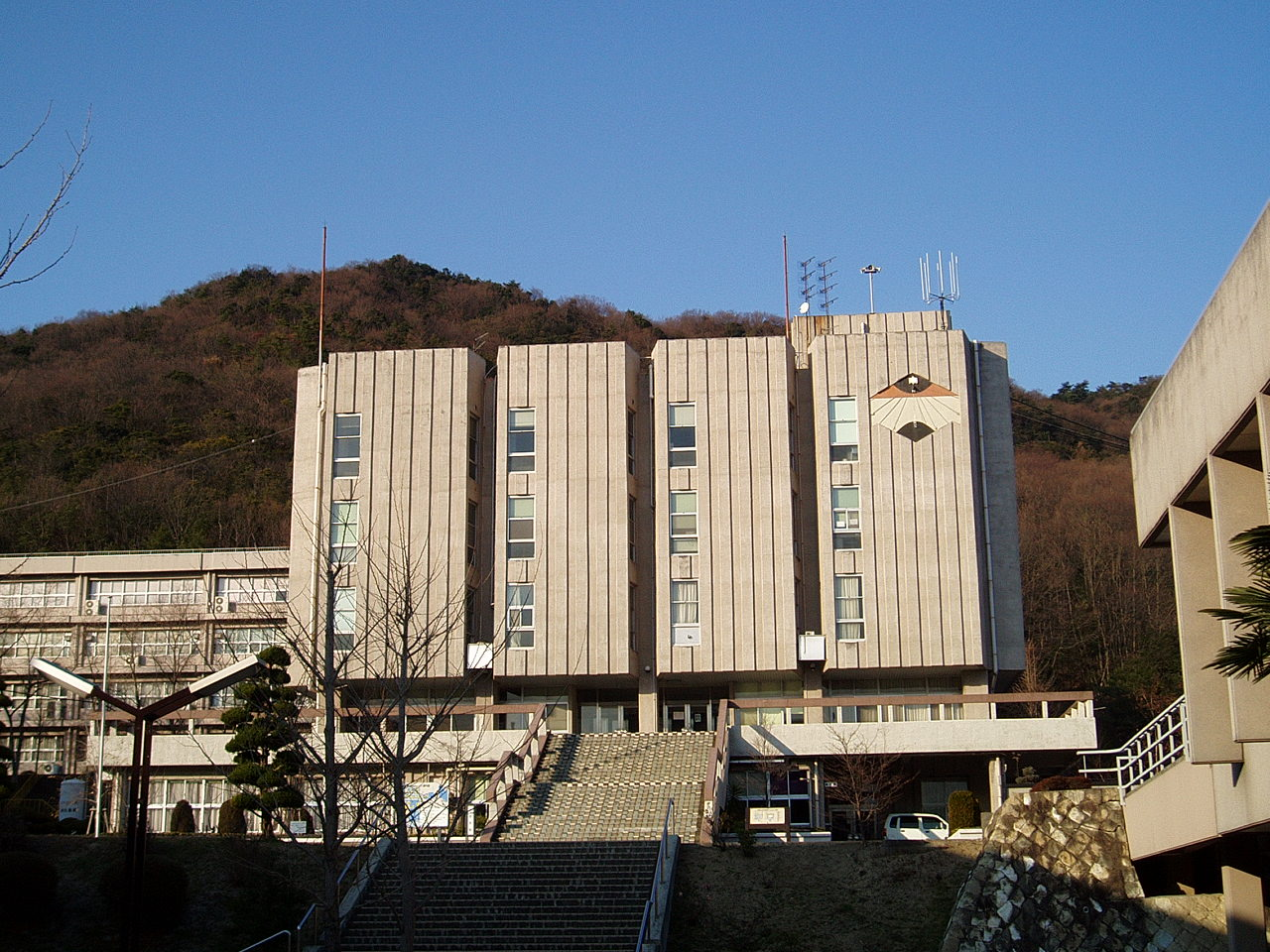
A section of The University of Hyogo campus

The University of Hyogo (兵庫県立大学, Hyōgo kenritsu daigaku; lit. 'Hyogo Prefectural University') is a public university in Kobe, Hyogo, Japan.

== History ==
The University of Hyogo (UH) was established in April 2004 by integrating three universities which were run by Hyogo Prefecture government: Kobe University of Commerce (神戸商科大学, Kōbe shōka daigaku), Himeji Institute of Technology (姫路工業大学, Himeji kōgyō daigaku) and the College of Nursing Art and Science, Hyogo (兵庫県立看護大学, Hyōgo kenritsu kango daigaku).

At its foundation, UH opened a new independent campus (with its headquarters) in the Harborland (Chuo-ku, Kobe); the other campuses were those of the predecessors:

- former Kobe University of Commerce:
  - Kobe Gakuentoshi Campus (in Nishi-ku, Kobe)
- former Himeji Institute of Technology:
  - Himeji Shosha Campus (in Himeji, Hyogo)
  - Harima Science Garden City Campus (in Kamigori-cho, Hyogo)
  - Himeji Shinzaike Campus (in Himeji, Hyogo)
- former College of Nursing Art and Science, Hyogo:
  - Akashi Campus (in Akashi, Hyogo)

Below are the histories of the predecessors:

=== Kobe University of Commerce ===
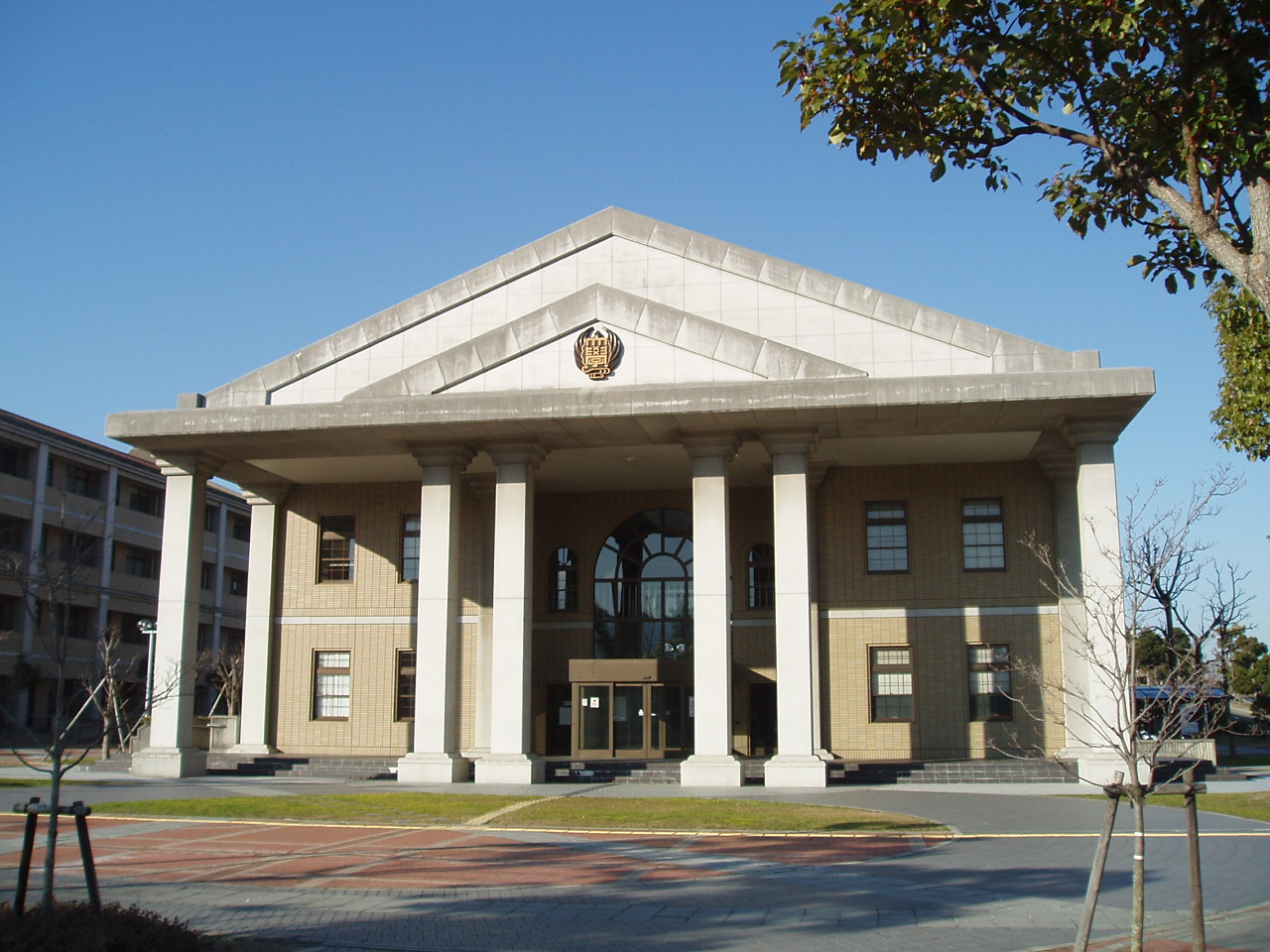
The administration office in Kobe Gakuentoshi Campus, built around 1990

KUC was founded in 1929 as Hyogo Prefectural Kobe Higher Commercial School (兵庫県立神戸高等商業学校), a men's college (for age 17-20 or above). Because in 1929 the older Kobe Higher Commercial School (a national college) was reorganized into older Kobe University of Commerce (for age 19-22 or above; see Kobe University), the prefecture lost a college for boys at age 17–20. So the prefecture founded its own commercial college. The campus was located on a hill called Seiryōdai (星陵台; lit. Starry Hill) in Tarumi. In 1944 the college was renamed Kobe College of Economics (神戸経済専門学校). Among the notable alumni are Isao Nakauchi (the founder of Daiei) and Nobuo Okishio (who finally graduated Kobe University).

In 1948 the college was reorganized into Kobe University of Commerce, the first public university under Japan's new educational system. In 1990 KUC moved to present-day Kobe Gakuentoshi Campus.

=== Himeji Institute of Technology ===
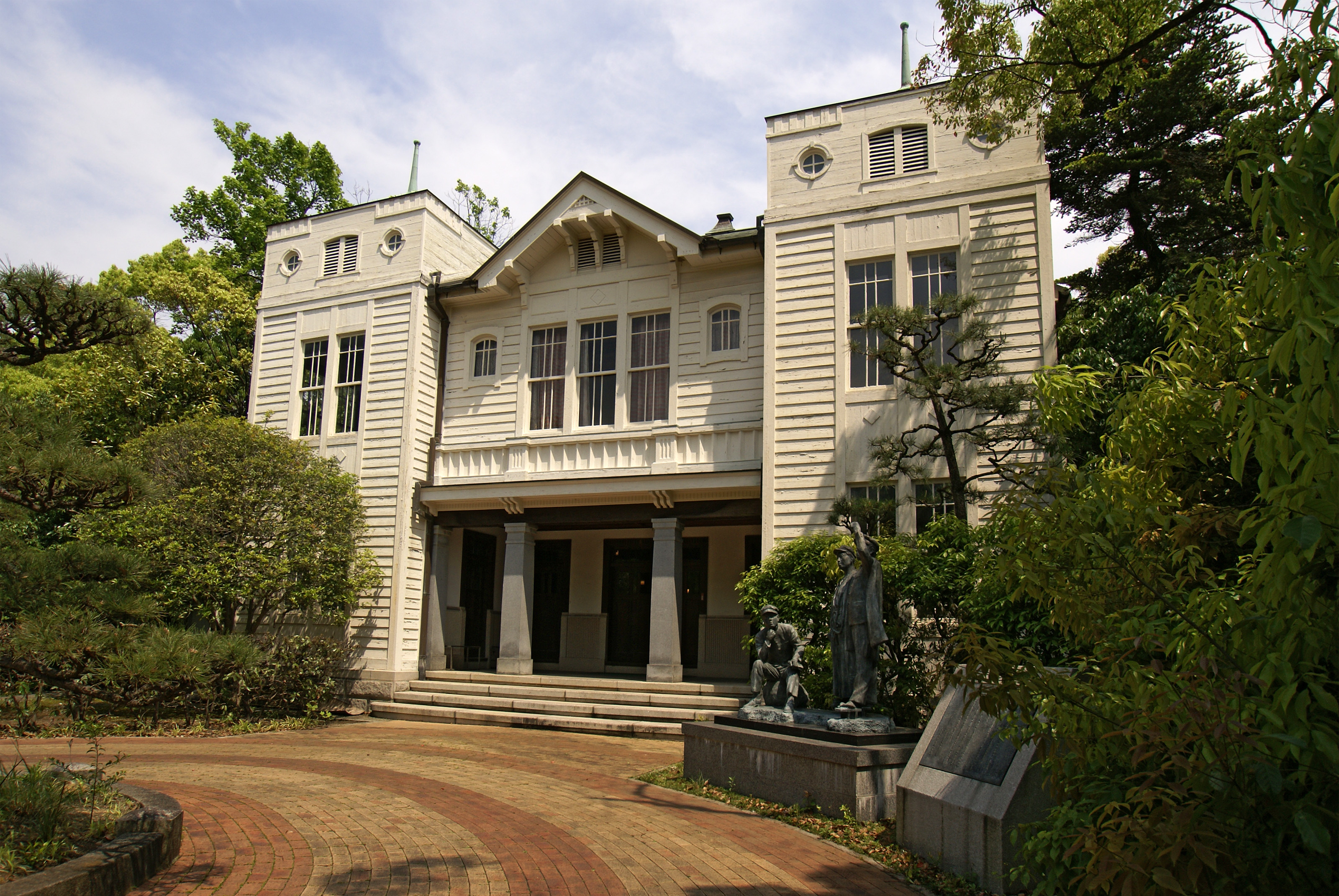
The old auditorium (in Himeji Shinzaike Campus), built in 1926

HIT was founded in 1944 as Hyogo Prefectural Technical School (兵庫県立高等工業学校), a men's college with three departments: Mechanics, Electronics and Applied Chemistry. The first campus was located on a hill of Goinoike, Nagata-ku, Kobe. In 1945 the campus was heavily bombed; in 1946, after World War II, the college was removed to Idei, Himeji.

In 1949 the school was reorganized into Himeji Institute of Technology under Japan's new educational system. In 1957 HIT department of junior college was reorganized into Himeji College, an independent college; in 1965 the college was removed to present-day Himeji Shinzaike Campus (the former campus of Himeji Higher School, a predecessor of Kobe University). HIT moved to present-day Himeji Shosha Campus in 1970. In 1990 HIT School of Science was established, and new Harima Science Garden City Campus was opened for the school in 1991. In 1998 Himeji College was reorganized into HIT School of Human Science and Environment.

=== College of Nursing Art and Science, Hyogo ===
CNASH was established in 1993; it was the first public 4-year college of nursing in Japan. The Graduate School was implemented by 1999 (both Master's and Doctoral programs).

== Undergraduate Schools ==
- in Kobe Gakuentoshi Campus:
  - School of Economics
  - School of Business Administration
- in Himeji Shosha Campus:
  - School of Engineering
- in Harima Science Garden City Campus:
  - School of Science
- in Himeji Shinzaike Campus:
  - School of Human Science and Environment
- in Akashi Campus:
  - College of Nursing Art and Science

== Graduate Schools ==
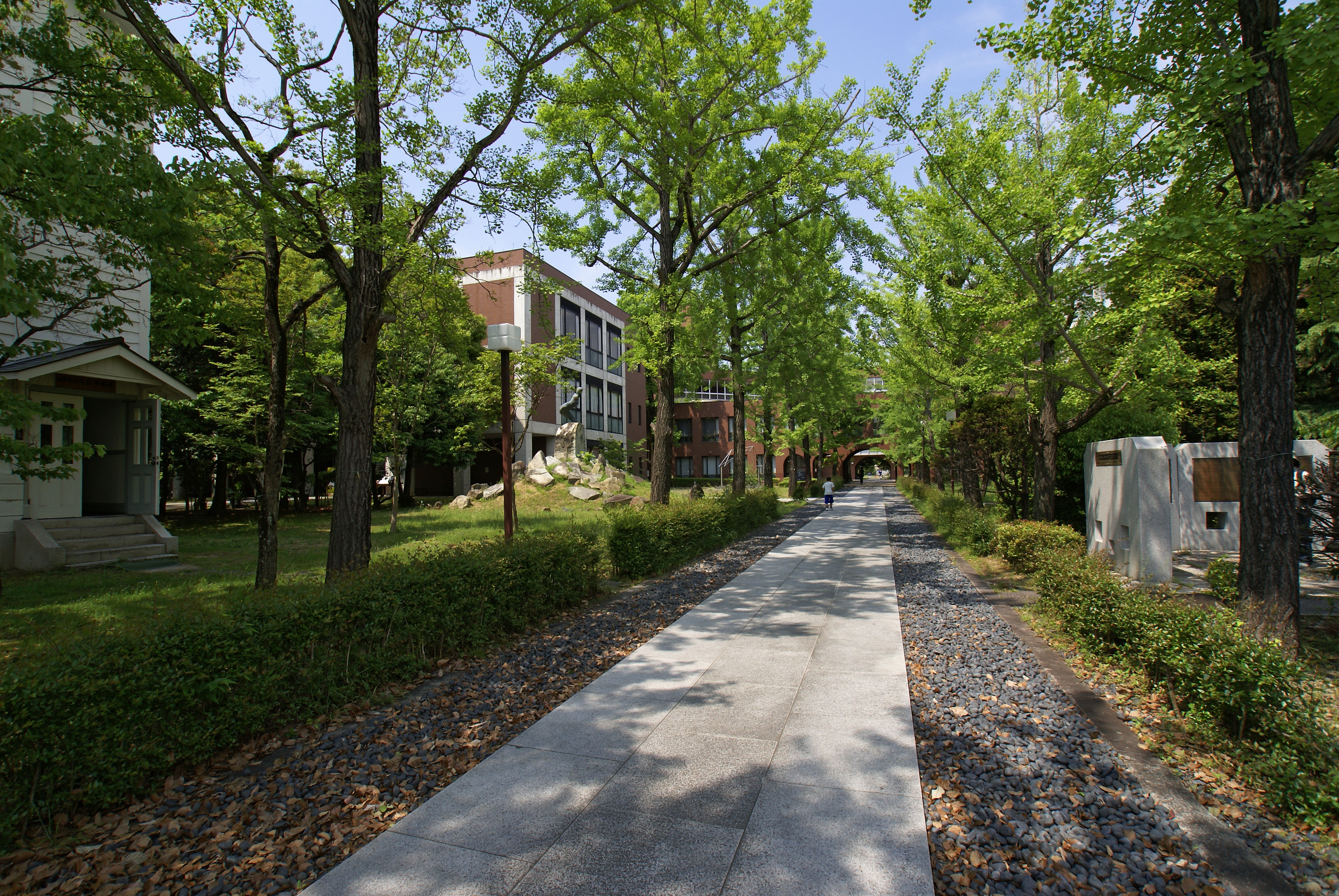
Himeji Shinzaike Campus

- in Kobe Campus:
  - Graduate School of Simulation Studies
  - Graduate School of Applied Informatics
- in Kobe Gakuentoshi Campus:
  - Graduate School of Economics
  - Graduate School of Business Administration
  - Graduate School of Accountancy (Department of Professional Accountancy)
- in Himeji Shosha Campus:
  - Graduate School of Engineering
- in Harima Science Garden City Campus:
  - Graduate School of Material Science
  - Graduate School of Life Science
- in Himeji Shinzaike Campus:
  - Graduate School of Human Science and Environment
- in Akashi Campus:
  - Graduate School of Nursing Art and Science

== Institutes ==
- Research Institute for Economics and Business Administration (in Kobe Gakuentoshi)
- Laboratory of Advanced Science and Technology for Industry (in Harima Science Garden City)
- Institute of Natural and Environmental Sciences
  - Nature and Environment Division (in Sanda)
  - Landscaping and Horticulture Division (in Awaji)
  - Rural Ecology Division (in Toyooka)
  - Astronomy and Astrophysics Division (in Sayo-cho)
- Research Institute of Nursing Care for People and Community (in Akashi)

== Academic rankings ==
The university ranking of the ratio of "president and chief executive officer of listed company"
	Ranking
all universities in Japan	11th out of all the 744 universities which existed as of 2006
Source	2006 survey by Weekly Diamond on the ranking of the universities which produced the high ratio of the graduates who hold the position of "president and chief executive officer of listed company" to all the graduates of each university
