= Cascade (band) =

Japanese visual kei rock band

- Origin: Japan
- Genres: Alternative rock; new wave; post-punk; pop punk; power pop
- Years active: 1993–2002, 2009-present
- Labels: Universal/Polydor; Victor; Amuse Soft Entertainment
- Members: Tama; Masashi; Hiroshi
- Past members: Makko; Q-Shi; Miyuki; Kagemary
- Website: Official site

Cascade (stylized as CASCADE) is a Japanese visual kei rock band, with a sound not typical of others in the movement, in that it is strongly influenced by new wave music. The band formed in 1993 and disbanded in August 2002, but six years later the band reunited and released a new album in 2009, Vivo.

== History ==
Cascade's song "S.O.S. Romantic" was covered by Mix Speaker's, Inc. on the compilation Crush! -90's V-Rock Best Hit Cover Songs-, which was released on January 26, 2011, and features current visual kei bands covering songs from bands that were important to the '90s visual kei movement. Their song "Flowers of Romance" was covered by Adapter. on Crush! 2 -90's V-Rock Best Hit Cover Songs-, its sequel released on November 23, 2011.

== Members ==
- Tama (Vocals) was born on January 13, in Kyoto.
- Masashi (Guitar) was born on November 30, in Kagoshima.
- Hiroshi (Drums) was born September 18, in Okayama.

Former members

- Kagemary (Synth)
- Miyuki (Bass)
- Q-Shi (Drums)
- Makko (Bass) was born on June 24, in Yamanashi.

== Discography ==
=== Singles ===
- "Narikiri Bonnie and Clyde" (なりきりボニー&クライド, 1996/9/21)
- "Oh Yeah Baby" (1997/3/21)
- "Yellow Yellow Fire" (1997/6/21)
- "Super Car" (スーパーカー, 1997/11/21) Oricon Weekly Single Chart Top Position: 30
- "S.O.S Romantic" (S.O.S ロマンティック, 1998/4/22) Oricon Weekly Single Chart Top Position: 17
- "Flowers of Romance" (1998/8/12) Oricon Weekly Single Chart Top Position: 5
- "Cuckoo" (1998/11/11) Oricon Weekly Single Chart Top Position: 10
- "Memories" (メモリーズ, 1999/1/27) Oricon Weekly Single Chart Top Position: 13
- "Azayakana Kiseki" (アザヤカナキセキ, 1999/2/24) Oricon Weekly Single Chart Top Position: 26
- "Dance Capriccio" (1999/10/27) Oricon Weekly Single Chart Top Position: 15
- "Congracche" (コングラッチェ, 2000/1/26) 9th Ending Theme of Japanese Anime Kindaichi Case Files, Oricon Weekly Single Chart Top Position: 28
- "Tokyo Darling" (TOKYOダーリン, 2000/5/17)
- "Sexy, Sexy," (2000/11/16) Ending Theme of Japanese Anime Ghost Stories, Oricon Weekly Single Chart Top Position: 25
- "Strawberry Moon" (2001/4/25)
- "Partiful Saruman Life" (2010/4/13)
- "Bonnou Hakusho Part 2" (2011/2/2)

=== Albums ===
- Viva! (1995/11/22) Oricon Weekly Album Chart Top Position: 55
- Beautiful Human Life (1996/3/23) Oricon Weekly Album Chart Top Position: 71
- Samurai Man (サムライマン, 1996/10/23) Oricon Weekly Album Chart Top Position: 49
- Apollo Exercise (1997/3/25)
- Yellow Magical Typhoon (1997/7/24) Oricon Weekly Album Chart Top Position: 31
- 80*60=98 (1998/6/17) Oricon Weekly Album Chart Top Position: 6
- Kodomo Z (コドモZ, 1999/3/25) Oricon Weekly Album Chart Top Position: 8
- Piaza (ピアザ, 2000/2/23) Oricon Weekly Album Chart Top Position: 18
- Adrenalin No.5 (2000/6/14) Oricon Weekly Album Chart Top Position: 15
- Butterfly Limited Express (2001/6/13) Oricon Weekly Album Chart Top Position: 33
- Viva Nice Best (2002/9/19) Oricon Weekly Album Chart Top Position: 46
- Vivo (2009/4/15)
- Magallanica (2010/5/19)

=== Video releases ===
- Macaroni (マカロニ, 1996/6/21) VHS
- Teritori-Machinegun (1997/4/23) VHS
- Kageki na Bouryoku (カゲキな暴力 CASCADE SHOW AT BUDOKAN, 1998/3/21) VHS
- Komanchi (コマンチ, 1999/6/23) VHS and DVD
- Risutora Shite Kudasai yo (リストラして下さいよ。, 2000/11/8)
- Viva Nice DVD (2002/11/21) DVD
- Last Tour 2002 Omise Dekinai Noga Zannen Desuga (ラストツアー2002 お見せできないのが残念ですが Live at Osaka, 2002/11/21) DVD
- Adios (2003/8/30) DVD
