= Hysteric Blue =

Japanese band

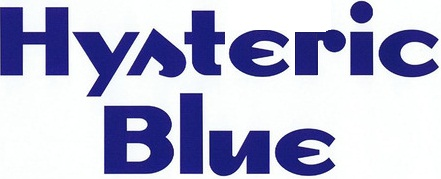

Background information
- Origin: Osaka, Japan
- Genres: Pop rock, indie rock, pop punk, alternative rock
- Years active: 1997–2004
- Label: Sony Music
- Past members: Mayumi "Tama" Takeda (Vocals); Takuya Kusunose (Drums); Naoki Akamatsu (Guitar)

Hysteric Blue was a Japanese rock band formed in Osaka, Japan in 1997 and disbanded in 2004. During the course of their musical career they released a total of 14 singles, five studio albums, one compilation album, three video compilations, one DVD and 16 music videos.

They are known for providing the opening theme for the anime series Ghost Stories, the opening theme for Vampiyan Kids and the ending theme of Spiral ~Suiri no Kizuna~.

== History ==
The band was formed in July 1997 when childhood friends Tama and Takuya were performing as a four-piece band at their local venue, and were heard by Naoki. Immediately after forming, they made a demo tape and sent it to record labels. In June 1998, they signed a contract with Sony Records.

In 2000, the band released a song called "Grow Up" which became the theme song for the anime Ghost Stories. The anime gained international attention for the English dub, which mostly replaced the script with dark humor and references to pop culture.

On June 17, 2003, they announced their hiatus at a live performance. "We've absorbed a lot of things in the four or five years since our debut, but gradually our individuality has come out. We decided to take a break and do what we want to do, then get back together," Takuya explained.

Breakup

The band broke up in 2004 after guitarist Naoki Akamatsu was convicted of nine counts of rape and sentenced to 14 years of prison. The breakup was announced on their website. Vocalist Tama and drummer Takuya subsequently started a new band, The Screaming Frogs. Takuya also expanded into stage and theater music.

== Legacy ==
In 2011, the Screaming Frogs disbanded and Tama and Takuya formed a new band, Sabão. It disbanded in 2018.

Akamatsu was released from prison in 2016. In 2020, he was arrested on suspicion of attempted obscenity. He was convicted in 2021, and sentenced to 1 year and 2 months in prison.

Tama became inactive in 2018, citing mental health as a contributing factor. However, she returned to singing in 2023 when she collaborated with milktub and became a vocalist for one of their video games.

== Discography ==
=== Singles ===
1. RUSH! (1998-10-31)
2. Haru ~spring~ (春～spring～) (1999–1–21)
3. Little Trip (1999–5–8)
4. Naze... (なぜ...) (1999–7–28)
5. Futari Bocchi (ふたりぼっち) (1999-10-22)
6. Chokkan Paradise (直感パラダイス) (2000–1–26)
7. Dear (2000–3–29)
8. Grow Up (グロウアップ) (2000-10-25)
9. Daisuki (だいすき) (2000-11-22)
10. Reset me (2001–8–22)
11. Frustration Music (フラストレーション ミュージック) (2001-10-24)
12. Bayside Baby (ベイサイドベイビー) (2002–1–23)
13. Home Town (2002–11–7)
14. DOLCE ~Natsuiro Renbo~ (DOLCE～夏色恋慕～) (2003–6–18)

=== Albums ===
1. Baby Blue (1999–4–1)
2. WALLABY (2000–2–23)
3. Bleu-Bleu-Bleu (2001–1–24)
4. MILESTONE (2002–2–20)
5. JUNCTION (2003–8–6)

=== Compilations ===
1. Historic Blue (2002-11-20)

=== Video Compilations ===
1. Baby Clips 1
2. Baby Clips 2
3. Baby Clips 3

=== DVD ===
1. Historic Blue Films
