= Akamatsu Norimura =

Japanese samurai and clan leader (1277–1350)

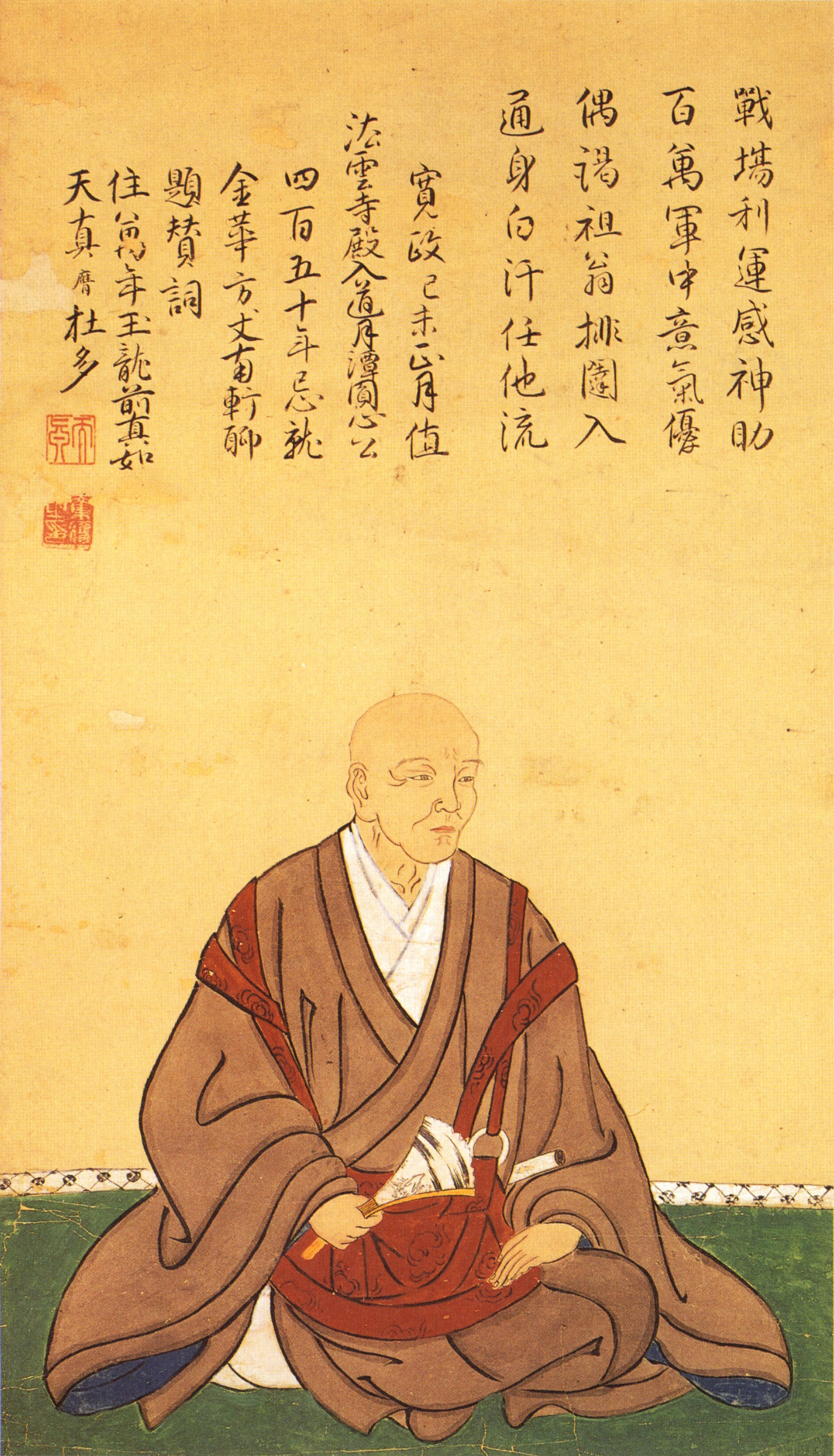
- Akamatsu Norimura.
- Born: 1277
- Died: February 18, 1350 (aged 72–73)
- Military career
- Era: Muromachi

Akamatsu Norimura (赤松 則村; 1277 – February 18, 1350) also well known as Akamatsu Enshin was a Japanese samurai of the Akamatsu clan in the Muromachi period. He was governor (shugo) of Harima Province in Hyōgo Prefecture. Norimura was a patron of Sesson Yūbai who established Hōun-ji and Hōrin-ji in Harima. In records about the establishment of land rights for Daitoku-ji in Kyoto, Norimura's help is recognized.

He was the father of Akamatsu Norisuke.

== Warrior ==
Norimura supported Emperor Go-Daigo and Ashikaga Takauji in the struggle to overcome the Kamakura shogunate. Akamatsu joined Takauji in capturing Kyoto from imperial forces on 23 Feb. 1336. He then became a part of the Ashikaga shogunate. Before the Battle of Minatogawa, his Shirahata castle was surrounded by Emperor Go-Daigo's large force led by Nitta Yoshisada but he held the castle over 50 days it helped Ashikaga Takauji regroup its forces in Kyushu. Norimura constructed a fort on a hill which later became the site for Himeji Castle.
