= Akamatsu Masanori =

- 赤松 政範
- Died: 1477
- Relatives: Akamatsu Masamoto
- Military career
- Allegiance: Hosokawa clan
- Rank: General
- Conflicts: Ōnin War
- Other work: Governor or constable (shugo) of northern Kaga Province

Akamatsu Masanori (赤松 政範; d. 1477) was one of the chief generals of the Hosokawa clan in the Ōnin War.

== Early life ==
Masanori was a son of Akamatsu Masamoto.

== Daimyo ==
Masanori succeeded his father as head of the Akamatsu clan.

In 1458, Masanori was appointed governor or constable (shugo) of northern Kaga Province.
