= Akamatsu clan =

Japanese samurai family

Akamatsu 赤松
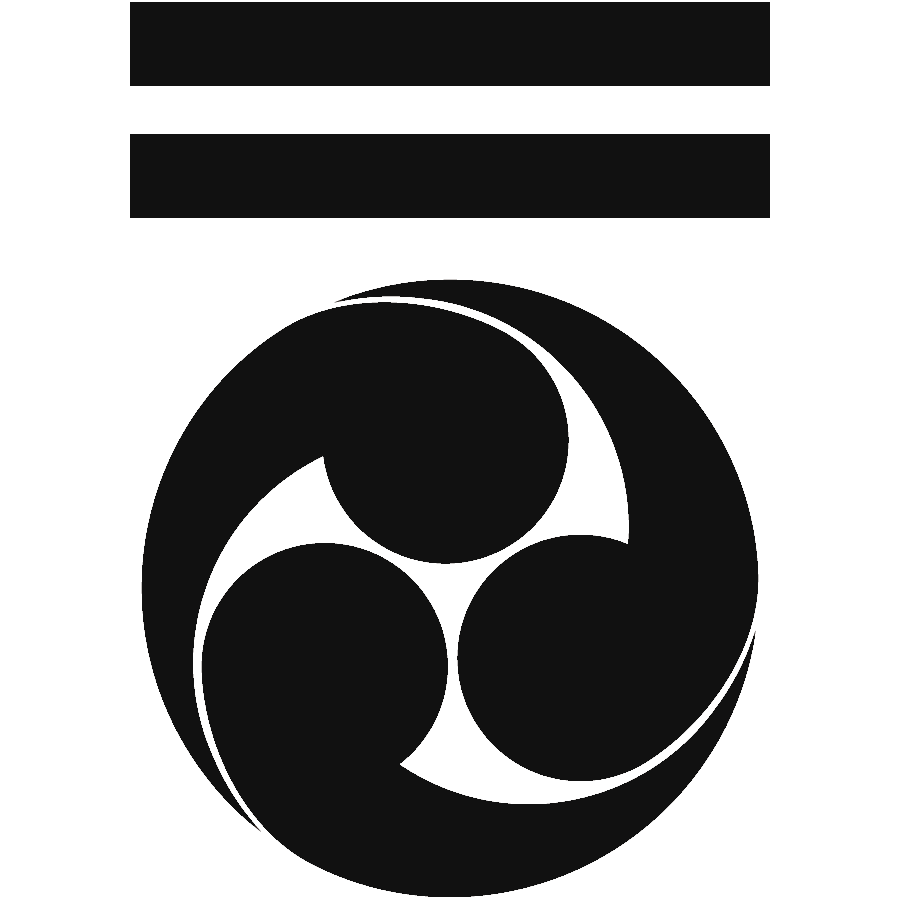
- Emblem (mon) of the Akamatsu clan
- Home province: Harima
- Parent house: Minamoto clan (Murakami-Genji)
- Titles: Various
- Founder: Akamatsu Norimura
- Founding year: 1336
- Ruled until: 1521, defeated by the Uragami clan
- Cadet branches: Shinmen clan

Akamatsu clan (赤松氏, Akamatsu-shi) is a Japanese samurai family of direct descent from Minamoto no Morifusa of the Murakami-Genji (Minamoto clan).

== History ==
They were prominent shugo-daimyō in Harima during the Sengoku period.

The clan was founded in 1366 by Akamatsu Norimura after allying himself with Ashikaga Takauji to fight the Kamakura Shogunate and were one of only four families made eligible to head the Samurai Dokoro during the time of the Muromachi Shogunate.

During the Ōnin no ran (1467–1477), Akamatsu Masanori was one of the chief generals of the Hosokawa clan.

The head of the clan at Shizuoka in Suruga Province became a kazoku baron in 1887.

The Shinmen clan were a branch of the Akamatsu.

== Select members of the clan ==
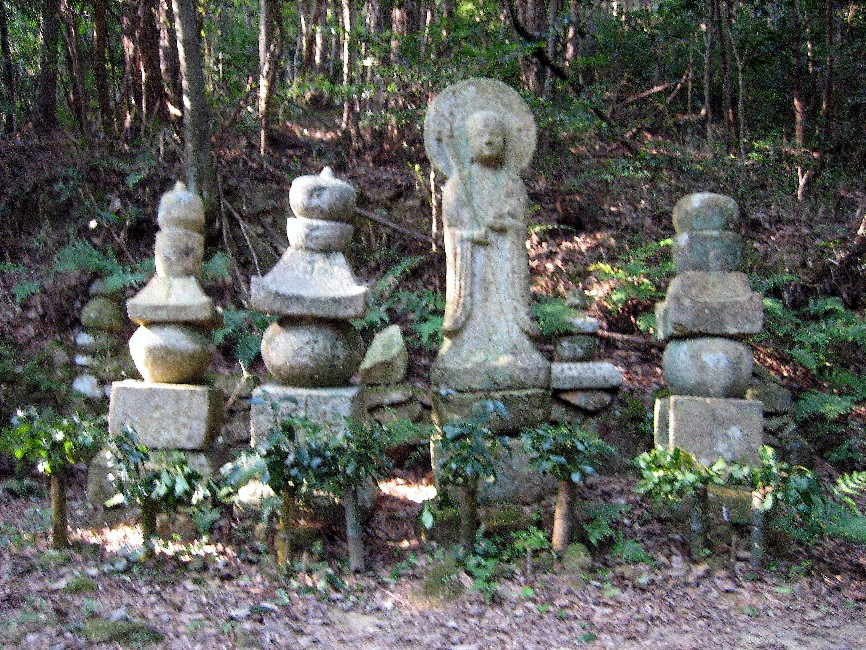
Akamatsu grave markers at Harima

- Akamatsu Norimura (1277–1350).
- Akamatsu Norisuke (1314–1371).
- Akamatsu Mitsusuke (1381–1441).
- Akamatsu Sadaura
- Akamatsu Masanori (d.1577)
- Akamatsu Yoshisuke
- Akamatsu Norifusa (1559–1598)

== See also ==
- Akamatsu Tōshōin
- Sesson Yūbai (1290–1348)
