= 2024 Hyogo gubernatorial election =

Election in Japan

2024 Hyōgo gubernatorial election
- 17 November 2024
- Turnout: 55.65% ▲14.55 pp
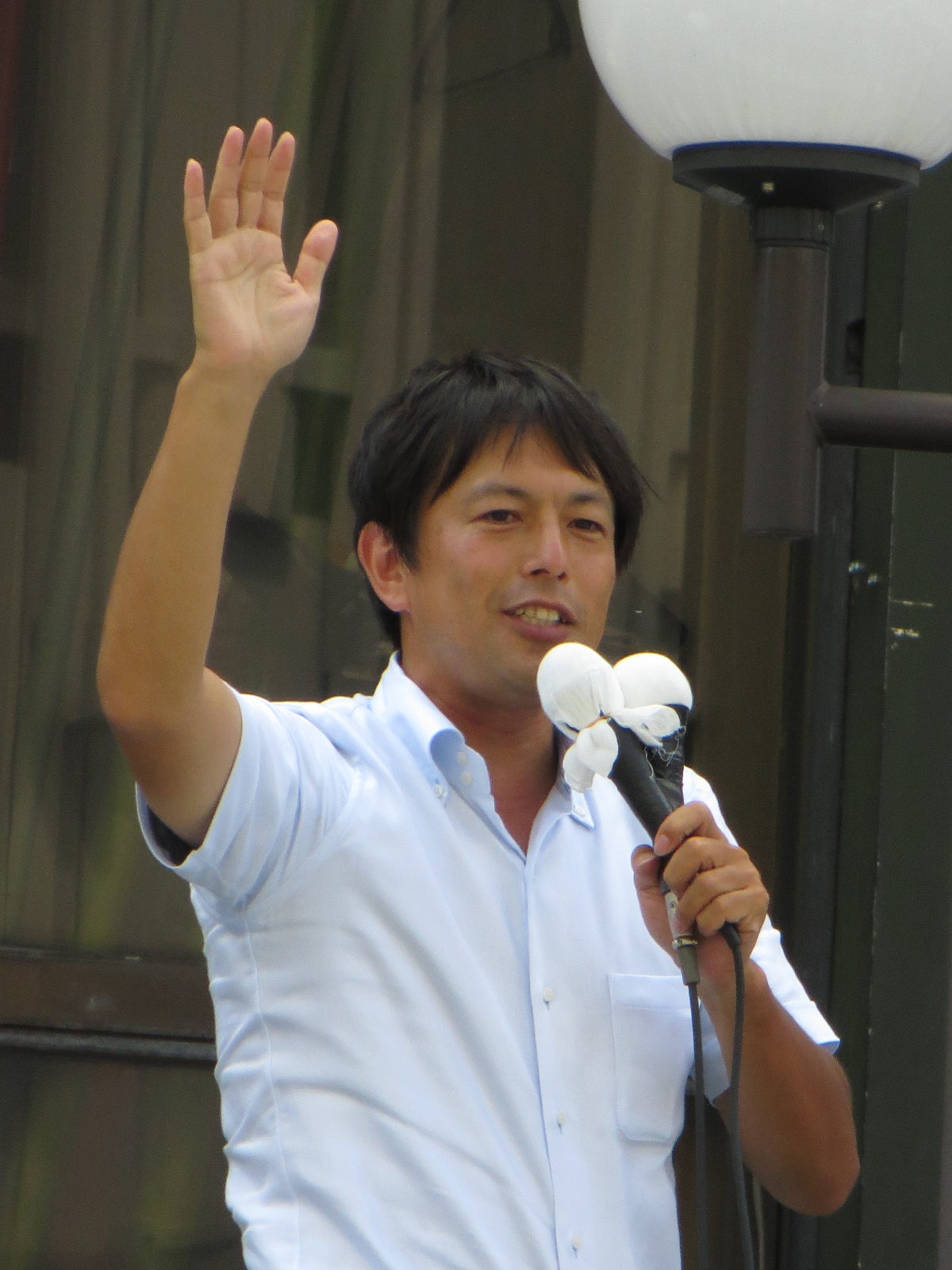
Candidate	Motohiko Saitō	Kazumi Inamura	Takayuki Shimizu
Party	Independent	Independent	Independent
Popular vote	1,113,911	976,637	258,388
Percentage	45.2%	39.6%	10.5%
Supported by	LDP (partially)	CDP, DPFP, LDP (partially)	Ishin, LDP (partially)
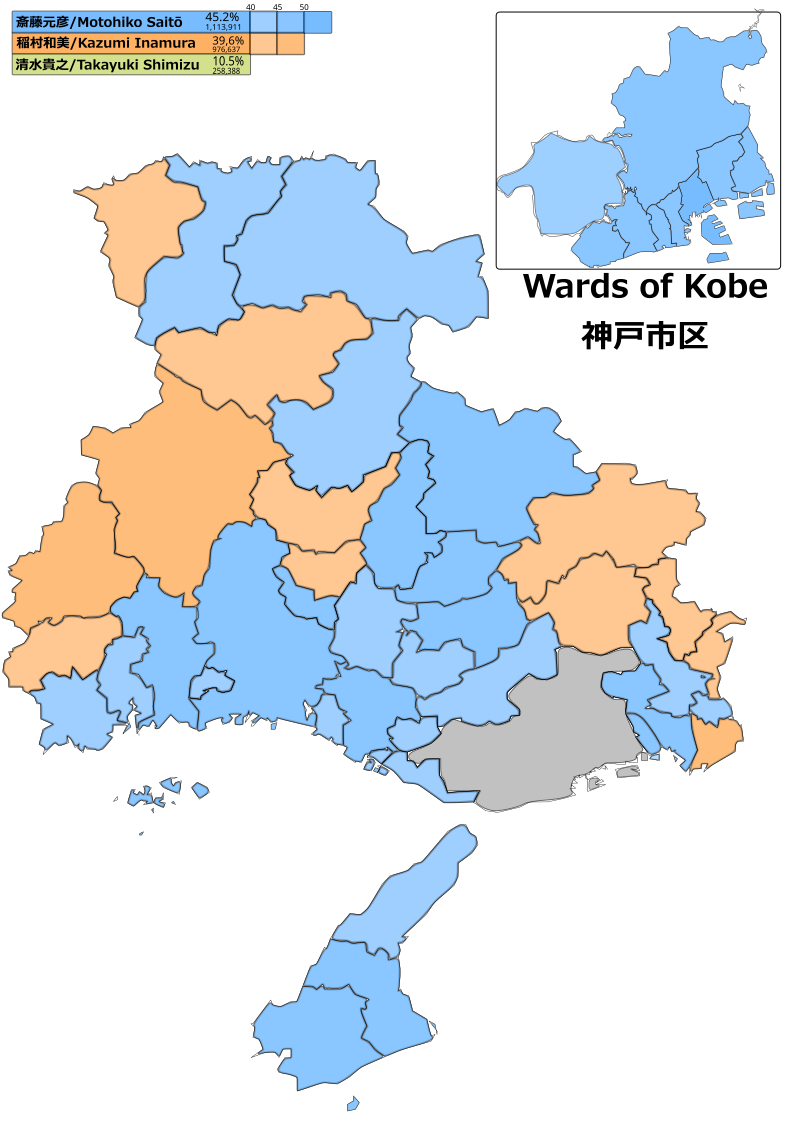
- Election results by municipalities.
Governor before election
Motohiko Saitō
Independent
Elected Governor
Motohiko Saitō
Independent

The 2024 Hyōgo gubernatorial election took place on 17 November 2024 to elect the governor of Hyōgo, Japan. Incumbent Motohiko Saitō was re-elected for a second term.

== Background ==
In March 2024, a former employee of the Hyōgo prefectural government sent a letter to several media outlets and politicians in which he accused Governor Motohiko Saitō of perpetrating acts of workplace bullying and engaging in corrupt practices. Saitō had access to the document and initiated an investigation in April, which concluded with disciplinary action against the employee and a three-month suspension. The rationale provided for these actions was that the letter in question constituted defamation. In June, the prefectural assembly resolved to constitute an independent committee to investigate the matter further, given their perception that the prefectural government had not been impartial. On 8 July, the prefectural police found the employee dead and ruled it as a suicide. After increasing and fruitless calls for Saitō to step down, in September 2024, the Hyōgo Prefectural Assembly unanimously adopted a no-confidence motion to urge Governor Saitō to resign, as he did not resign nor dissolve the assembly after the motion he was automatically removed from office. On 30 September, the prefectural assembly scheduled the gubernatorial election for 17 November. Saitō declared his intention to seek re-election in order to start a fresh mandate without the approval of Ishin, which decided to endorse Takayuki Shimizu, a former member of the House of Councillors as a candidate, nor the LDP, which decided to let the party members vote and support the candidate of their choice with some party branches supporting Shimizu and others Saitō. During that time, the former mayor of Amagasaki announced her intention to stand for election as governor, and received the endorsement of the Constitutional Democratic Party, the Democratic Party for the People and a branch of the Liberal Democratic Party. The Japanese Communist Party resolved to endorse Yoshikiyo Osawa. Meanwhile, Komeito instructed their members to vote freely. Takashi Tachibana, the leader of NHK Party, also announced his intention to take part in the race and claimed that accusations against the former governor were baseless.

== Campaign ==
The power harassment scandal has been at the centre of public speeches in this election. Former governor Saitō defended his policies during his last mandate and asserted that the revolution he had initiated remained unfinished. Kazumi Inamura stated that the prefecture had been shaken by the power harassment scandal and that Hyōgo was in urgent need of a leader who was suited to the role. During her campaign, her role as the former mayor of Amagasaki was emphasised. Shimizu stated that he was disheartened by the fact that Hyōgo was in the news for a tragic reason and he vowed to establish his beloved prefecture as a model of effective governance, beginning with the restoration of the institutions and the enhancement of administrative transparency. Osawa discussed the normalisation of the prefectural administration and highlighted his background as a medical professional.

The election would be held under first-past-the-post voting.

== Candidates ==
Name	Age	Party	Occupation
Motohiko Saitō	47	Independent	Former governor of Hyōgo Prefecture; Former director general of the Ministry of Internal Affairs and Communications
Kazumi Inamura	52	Independent	Former mayor of Amagasaki
Takayuki Shimizu	50	Independent	Former member of the House of Councillors; Ex-Asahi TV announcer
Yoshikiyo Osawa	61	Independent	Orthopedist; Insurance Doctor in Hyōgo Prefecture
Shigeyuki Fukutomo	58	Independent	President of a music publishing company
Takashi Tachibana	57	Independent	NHK Party leader Former member of the House of Councillors
Hirotsugu Kijima	49	Independent	President of a news analysis company

== Results ==
Name	Party	Votes	%	±%
Motohiko Saitō	Independent	1,113,911	45.2%	▼1.7%
Kazumi Inamura	Independent	976,637	39.6%	New
Takayuki Shimizu	Independent	258,388	10.5%	New
Yoshikiyo Osawa	Independent	73,862	3.0%	New
Takashi Tachibana	Independent	19,180	0.8%	New
Shigeyuki Fukutomo	Independent	12,721	0.5%	New
Hirotsugu Kijima	Independent	9,114	0.4%	New

=== Results by municipality ===
Municipality		Motohiko Saito		Kazumi Inamura		Takayuki Shimizu		Yoshikiyo Osawa		Takashi Tachibana	
Municipality		Votes	%	Votes	%	Votes	%	Votes	%	Votes	%
Total		1,113,911	45.2%	976,637	39.6%	258,388	10.5%	73,862	3.0%	19,180	0.8%
Kobe	Higashinada-ku	50,048	49.1%	36,903	36.2%	9,964	9.8%	3,557	3.5%	530	0.5%
Kobe	Nada-ku	30,377	48.6%	22,884	36.6%	6,191	9.9%	2,140	3.4%	368	0.6%
Kobe	Chuo-ku	30,515	52.7%	19,385	33.5%	5,470	9.4%	1,687	8.50%	342	0.6%
Kobe	Hyogo-ku	21,643	49.2%	14,984	34.0%	4,820	11.0%	1,773	4.0%	323	0.7%
Kobe	Kita-ku	43,301	45,9%	36,518	38.7%	10,187	10.8%	3,193	3.4%	571	0.6%
Kobe	Nagata-ku	17,332	47.7%	12,701	35.0%	3,948	10.9%	1,781	4.9%	246	0.7%
Kobe	Suma-ku	35,124	46.8%	28,080	37.4%	7,605	10.1%	3,058	4.1%	568	0.8%
Kobe	Tarumi-ku	45,105	46.8%	36,558	37.9%	9,867	10.2%	3,453	3.6%	637	0.7%
Kobe	Nishi-ku	48,153	44.9%	42,898	40.0%	11,480	10,7%	3,189	3.0%	684	0.6%
Amagasaki		78,462	40.3%	88,754	45.6%	16,739	8.6%	7,851	4.0%	1,294	0.7%
Nishinomiya		105,605	46.2%	87,678	38.4%	25,052	11.0%	6,843	3.0%	1,516	0.7%
Ashiya		23,975	48.5%	18,303	37.1%	4,985	10.1%	1,373	2.8%	398	0.8%
Itami		37,508	43.6%	34,760	40.4%	9,910	11.5%	2,590	3.0%	615	0.7%
Takarazuka		47,902	44.3%	42,807	39.6%	12,373	11.4%	3,507	3.2%	701	0.6%
Kawanishi		29,688	41.6%	29,884	41,8%	8,348	11.7%	2,264	3.2%	494	0.7%
Sanda		21,840	42.3%	22,167	42.9%	5,375	10.4%	1,408	2.7%	316	0.6%
Akashi		59,271	43.5%	55,377	40.6%	15,333	11.2%	3,609	2.6%	1,651	1.2%
Kakogawa		50,803	45.4%	44,770	40.0%	11,288	10.1%	3,078	2.8%	897	0.8%
Takasago		16,692	44.5%	15,012	40.1%	4,194	11.2%	923	2.5%	294	0.8%
Nishiwaki		8,489	46.5%	6,965	38.2%	2,080	11.4%	463	2.5%	126	0.7%
Miki		14,481	43.7%	13,511	40.8%	3,778	11.4%	828	2.5%	203	0.6%
Ono		9,559	44.3%	8,633	40.1%	2,476	11.5%	479	2.2%	176	0.8%
Kasai		8,790	44.1%	8,238	41.4%	2,100	10,5%	386	1.9%	174	0.9%
Kato		8,095	45.6%	7,115	40.1%	1,912	10.8%	328	1.8%	126	0.7%
Himeji		103,588	47.9%	81,432	37.7%	21,560	10.0%	5,030	2.3%	2,625	1.2%
Aioi		5,597	43.1%	5.539	42.6%	1,334	10.3%	299	2.3%	93	0.7%
Tatsuno		15,966	45.3%	14,234	40.4%	3,553	10.1%	710	2.0%	360	1.0%
Ako		8,892	42.4%	8,868	42.3%	2,290	10.9%	414	2.0%	206	1.0%
Shiso		7,358	40.9%	8,118	45.1%	1,788	9.9%	399	2.2%	176	1.0%
Toyooka		16,523	43.4%	16,213	42.6%	3,821	10.0%	995	2.6%	262	0.7%
Yabu		4,986	42.5%	5,231	44.5%	1,061	9.0%	281	2.4%	75	0.6%
Asago		6,544	43.2%	6,392	42.2%	1,505	9.9%	408	2.7%	116	0.8%
Tambasasayama		7,651	39.3%	8,692	44.7%	2,307	11.9%	473	2.4%	188	1.0%
Tamba		14,856	45.0%	13,026	39.5%	3,291	10.0%	897	2.7%	403	1.2%
Sumoto		8,366	45.2%	7,447	40.3%	1,838	9.9%	517	2.8%	159	0.9%
Minamiawaji		9,564	45.3%	8,329	39,5%	2,391	11.3%	396	1.9%	184	0.9%
Awaji		8,689	44.3%	7,787	39.7%	2,368	12.1%	452	2.3%	168	0.9%
Kawabe	Inagawa	5,677	39.1%	6,348	43.7%	1,924	13.3%	337	2.3%	88	0.6%
Kako	Inami	6,006	42,9%	5,786	41.4%	1,642	11.7%	301	2.2%	122	0.9%
Kako	Harima	6,359	42,9%	5,887	39.8%	1,943	13.1%	384	2.6%	111	0.7%
Taka	Taka	5,034	49.9%	3,639	36.0%	1,111	11.0%	170	1.7%	43	0.4%
Kanzaki	Ichikawa	2,556	41.7%	2,583	42.1%	698	11.4%	160	2.6%	47	0.8%
Kanzaki	Fukusaki	4,271	48.0%	3,430	38.5%	871	9.8%	179	2.0%	56	0.6%
Kanzaki	Kamikawa	2,744	43.0%	2,817	44.2%	606	9.5%	100	1.6%	46	0.7%
Ibo	Taishi	6,628	43.7%	6,037	39,8%	1,759	11.6%	386	2.5%	140	0.9%
Sayo	Sayo	3,205	37,4%	3,987	46.5%	933	10.9%	223	2.6%	125	1.5%
Ako	Kamigori	2,982	40.2%	3,250	43.9%	856	11.6%	183	2.5%	69	0.6%
Mikata	Kami	3,988	43.4%	3,532	40.8%	780	9.0%	218	2.5%	74	0.9%
Mikata	Shin'onsen	3,123	42.9%	3,158	43.4%	683	9.4%	189	2.6%	68	0.9%
