= List of cities in Hyōgo Prefecture by population =

The following list sorts all cities (including towns and villages) in the Japanese prefecture of Hyōgo with a population of more than 10,000 according to the 2020 Census. As of October 1, 2020, 41 places fulfill this criterion and are listed here. This list refers only to the population of individual cities, towns and villages within their defined limits, which does not include other municipalities or suburban areas within urban agglomerations.

== List ==
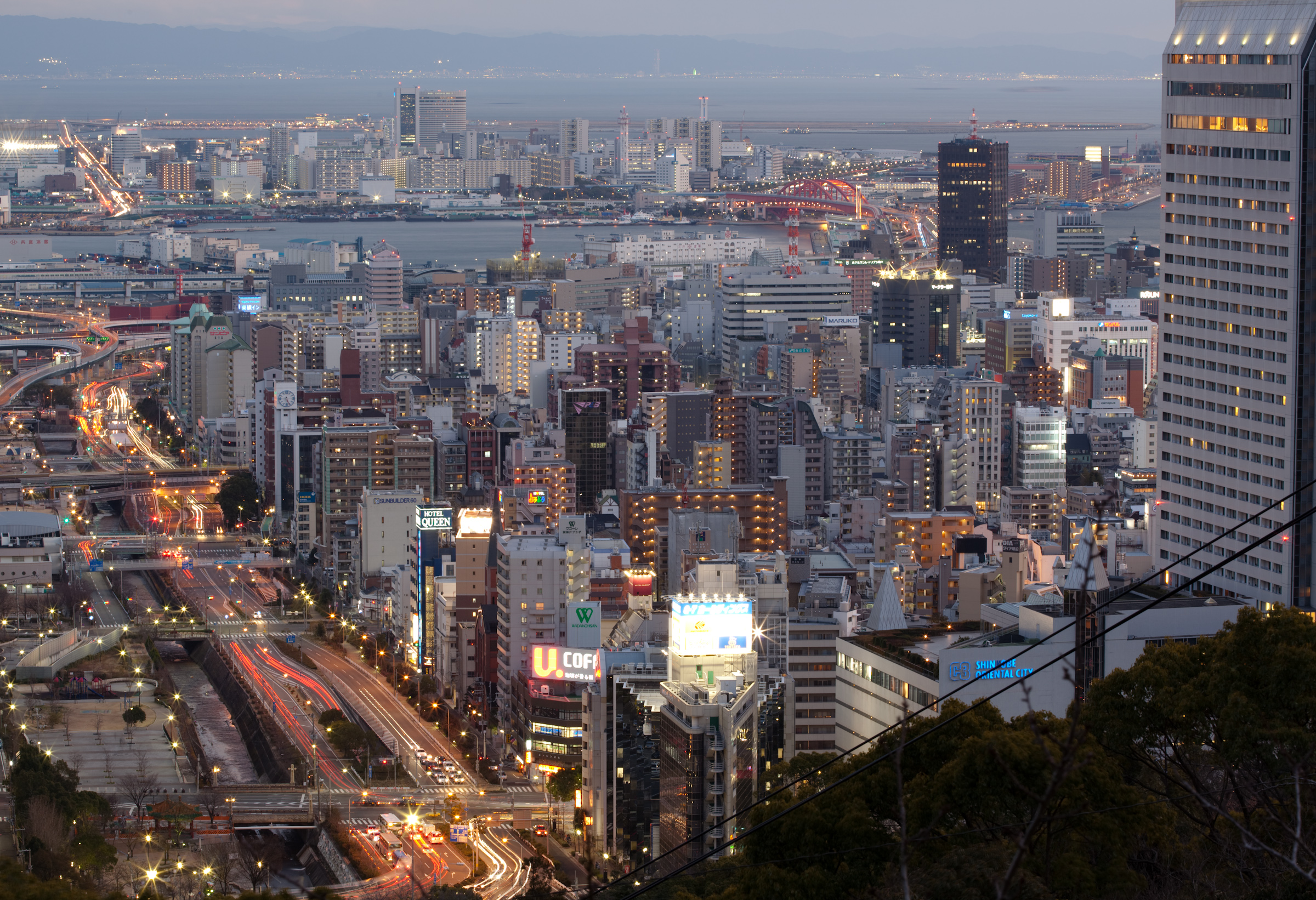
Kobe

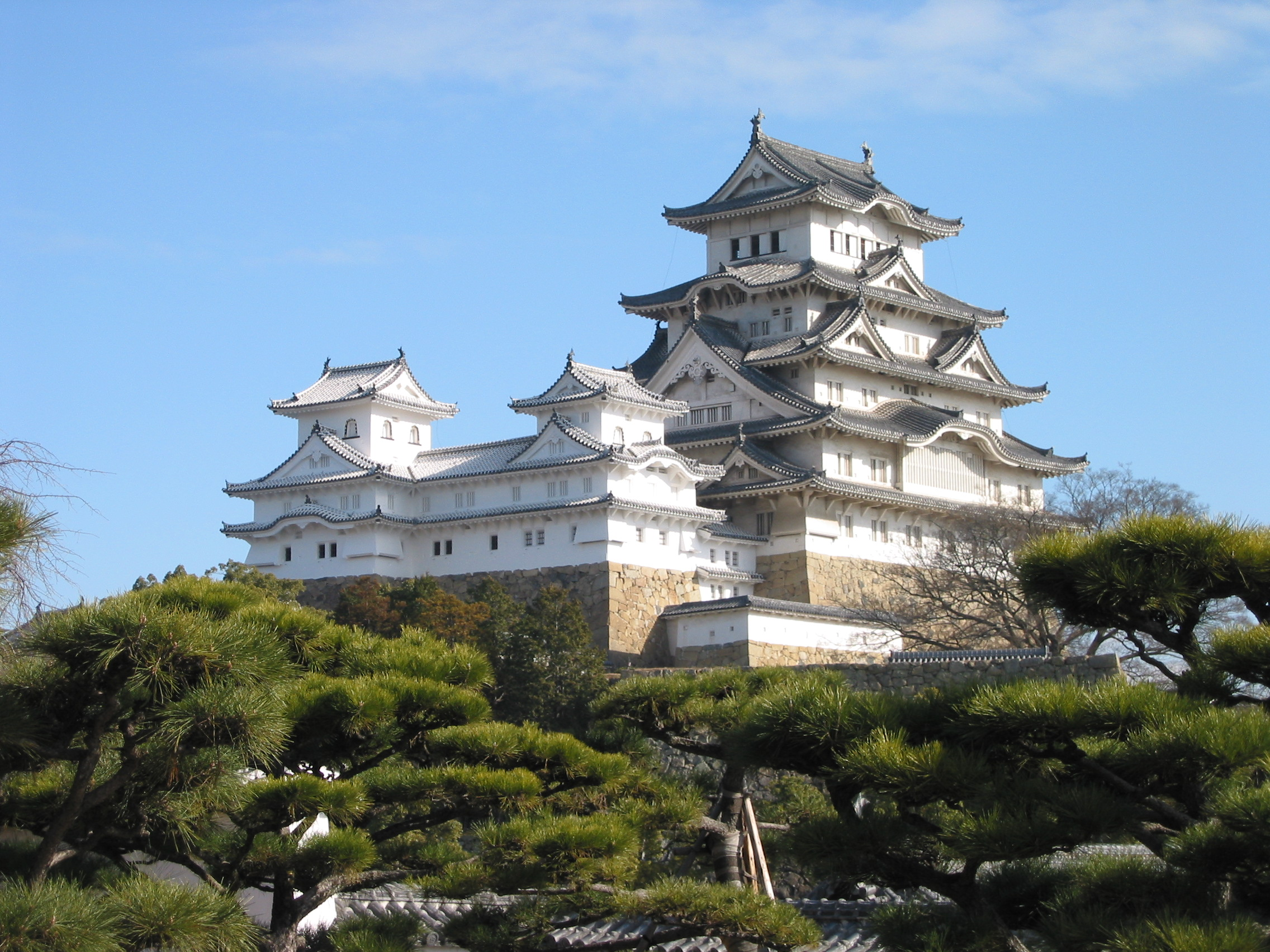
Himeji

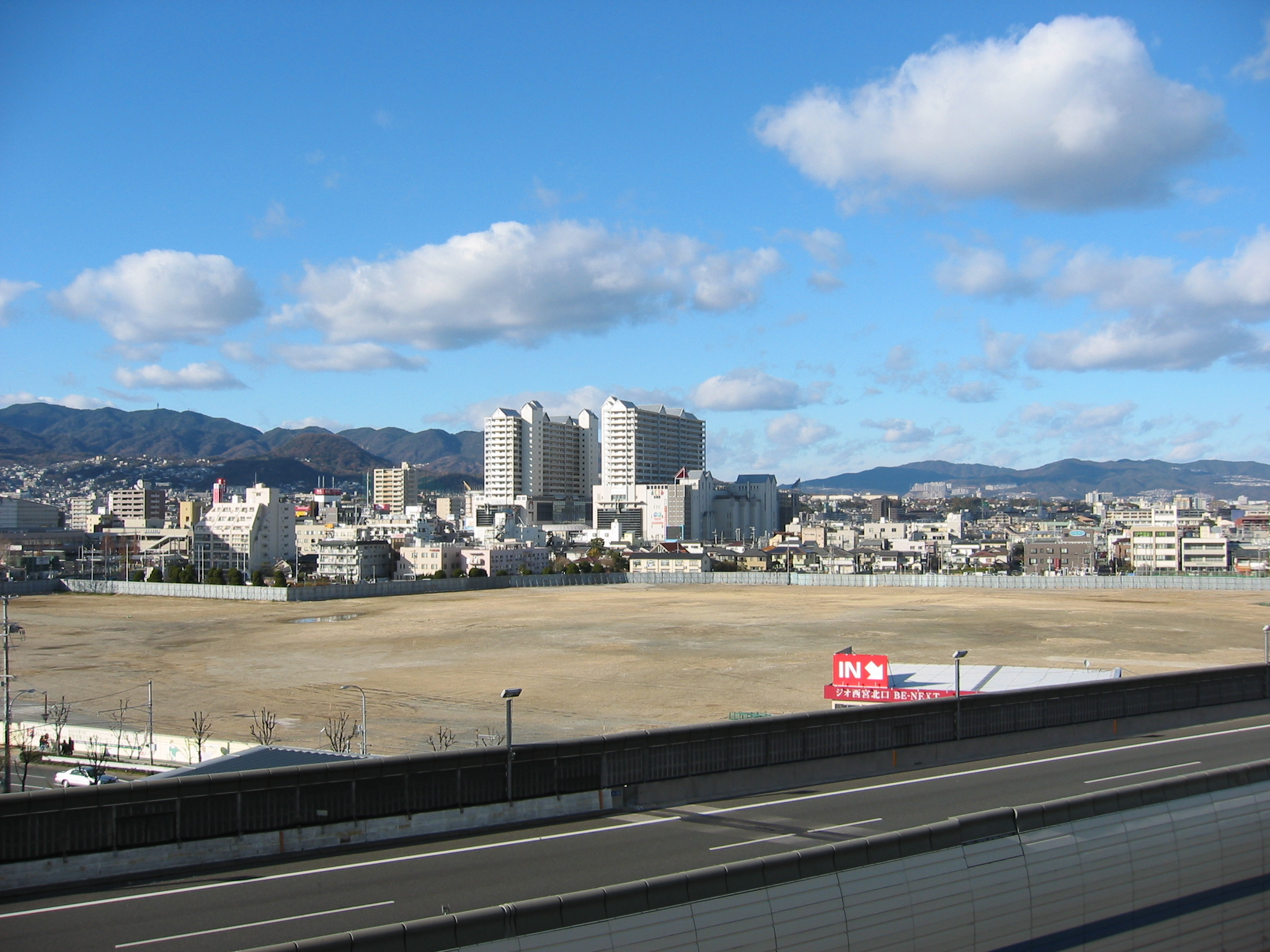
Nishinomiya

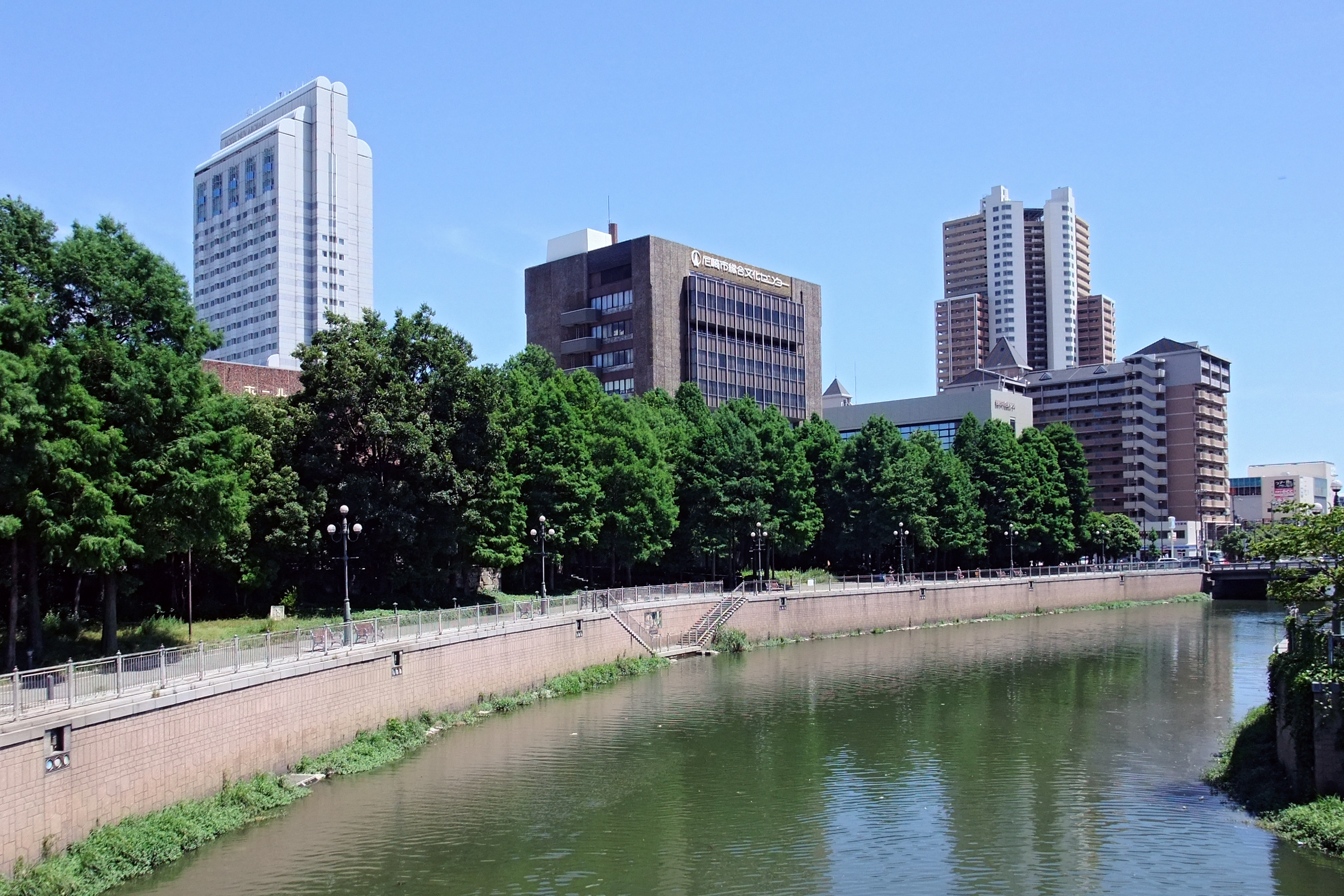
Amagasaki

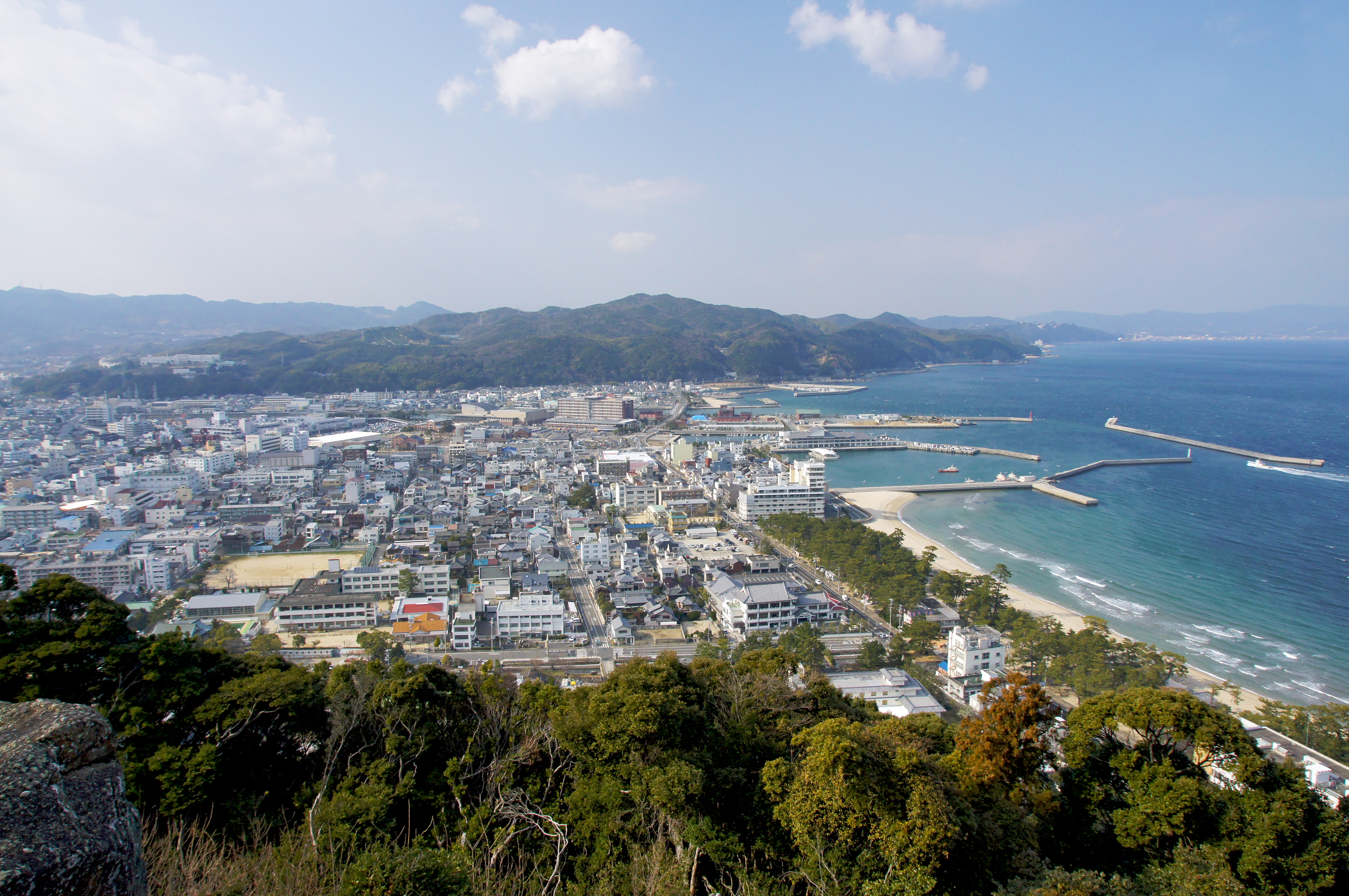
Sumoto

The following table lists the 41 cities, towns and villages in Hyōgo with a population of at least 10,000 on October 1, 2020, according to the 2020 Census. The table also gives an overview of the evolution of the population since the 1995 census.

Rank (2020)	Name	Status	2020	2015	2010	2005	2000	1995
1	Kōbe	City	1,527,022	1,537,272	1,544,200	1,525,393	1,493,398	1,423,792
2	Himeji	City	530,723	535,664	536,270	536,232	534,969	527,854
3	Nishinomiya	City	485,705	487,850	482,640	465,337	438,105	390,389
4	Amagasaki	City	459,717	452,563	453,748	462,647	466,187	488,586
5	Akashi	City	303,838	293,409	290,959	291,027	293,117	287,606
6	Kakogawa	City	260,988	267,435	266,937	267,100	266,170	260,567
7	Takarazuka	City	226,658	224,903	225,700	219,862	213,037	202,544
8	Itami	City	198,244	196,883	196,127	192,250	192,159	188,431
9	Kawanishi	City	152,473	156,375	156,423	157,668	153,762	144,539
10	Sanda	City	109,324	112,691	114,216	113,572	111,737	96,279
11	Ashiya	City	94,038	95,350	93,238	90,590	83,834	75,032
12	Takasago	City	87,758	91,030	93,901	94,813	96,020	97,632
13	Toyooka	City	77,519	82,250	85,592	89,208	92,752	93,859
14	Miki	City	75,373	77,178	81,009	84,361	86,117	86,562
15	Tatsuno	City	74,355	77,419	80,518	81,561	83,207	83,431
16	Tamba	City	61,511	64,660	67,757	70,810	72,862	73,988
17	Ono	City	47,591	48,580	49,680	49,761	49,432	48,214
18	Akō	City	45,921	48,567	50,523	51,794	52,077	51,426
19	Minamiawaji	City	44,180	46,912	49,834	52,283	54,979	56,664
20	Kasai	City	42,750	44,313	47,993	49,396	51,104	51,706
21	Awaji	City	42,028	43,977	46,459	49,078	51,884	53,235
22	Sumoto	City	41,329	44,258	47,254	50,030	52,248	52,839
23	Katō	City	40,683	40,310	40,181	39,970	40,688	39,743
24	Tamba-Sasayama	City	39,637	41,490	43,263	45,245	46,325	44,752
25	Nishiwaki	City	38,714	40,866	42,802	43,953	45,718	46,339
26	Shisō	City	34,852	37,773	40,938	43,302	45,460	47,685
27	Harima	Town	33,561	33,739	33,183	33,545	33,766	33,583
28	Taishi	Town	33,498	33,690	33,438	32,555	31,960	31,634
29	Inami	Town	30,268	31,020	31,026	31,944	32,054	31,377
30	Inagawa	Town	29,703	30,838	31,739	30,021	29,094	27,130
31	Asago	City	29,002	30,805	32,814	34,791	36,069	36,766
32	Aioi	City	28,374	30,129	31,158	32,475	34,320	36,103
33	Yabu	City	22,137	24,288	26,501	28,306	30,110	31,290
34	Fukusaki	Town	19,376	19,738	19,830	20,669	19,582	19,854
35	Taka	Town	19,284	21,200	23,104	24,304	25,331	25,440
36	Kami	Town	16,069	18,070	19,696	21,439	23,271	24,298
37	Sayō	Town	15,885	17,510	19,265	21,012	22,337	23,341
38	Kamigōri	Town	13,896	15,224	16,636	17,603	18,419	18,849
39	Shin'onsen	Town	13,328	14,819	16,004	17,467	18,601	19,629
40	Ichikawa	Town	11,239	12,300	13,288	14,150	14,812	15,060
41	Kamikawa	Town	10,633	11,452	12,289	13,077	13,500	13,829
