= Banshū Winery =

Banshū Vineyard
- 播州葡萄園 (Japanese)
- Banshū Vineyard site Banshū Winery (Japan)
- 34°44′37.5″N 134°56′53.6″E
- Nearest city: Inami, Hyōgo, Japan

History
- Founded: 1880
- Demolished: 1898

Site notes
- Area: 51,778.43 m^{2} (557,338.4 sq ft)
- National Historic Site of Japan

Banshū Vineyard (播州葡萄園, Banshū budō-en) was a Meiji period vineyard and winery located in the Inami neighborhood of the town of Inami, in south-central Hyōgo Prefecture, Japan. The ruins have been protected as a National Historic Site since 2006 with the area under protection expanded in 2007.

== Overview ==
The Banshū Vineyard was one of the national industrial promotion projects undertaken by the early Meiji government with the intent of fostering the modernization of Japanese industry and development of export products for foreign currency. Seedlings of Vitis vinifera grapes were imported in 1880 along with wine-making equipment. After some small initial success, the project was beset by several natural disasters. It was privatized in 1888 and went out of business in 1896. The location itself was lost for many years until rediscovered during field maintenance project in 1996 during which time bricks, glass bottles and the foundations for the winery structures were found. After archaeological excavation, the site as opened to the public as the "Banshu Grape Garden History Museum"

== History ==
During the Edo period, the village of Inami Shinmura in Kako district was impoverished, as it had poor access to water, and most of the land was upland fields. As the area was unsuitable for rice, cotton cultivation had been encouraged by Himeji Domain, and was the main source of local livelihood. However, from the Bakumatsu to the early Meiji period, cotton was hit hard due to drought and restrictions on the planted area. Himeji Domain enacted tax relief and provided rice to aid the villagers, but this ended with the abolition of the han system in1871. In addition, due to the opening of the country, the price of cotton fell due to the import of cheap foreign cotton. The land tax reform in 1873 put even more excessive burden on the farmers. Under these circumstances, the governor of Kako District, Hōjō Naomasa, saw an article in The Asahi Shimbun about the government searching for a candidate site for a viticulture test in the southwestern part of Japan. He immediately moved to attract this project to his district.

The land was "purchased" by the government, but in actuality was simply seized from local farmers in lieu of back taxes. The vineyard was laid out, and dormitory for workers, barn and winery were constructed in 1880 and 50,000 grape seedlings from France were imported. The 1881 harvest was of very small volume, and in 1882 Phylloxera was discovered in Japan. From 1883, the first wine was produced from 375 kilograms of grapes, from which four varieties of wine were attempted. In 1884, Japan's first glass-enclosed vineyard was completed, and a trial planting of six varieties of grapes yielded better-than-expected results. However, in June 1885 Phylloxera was discovered to have infested many of the grapes. In August of the same year, a large typhoon caused major damage to the facilities and many of the surviving grapes were damaged by seawater. In 1886, the director of the facility, Fukuta Hayato, was sent to France and Germany for further studies. In 1888, he purchased the facility for 10,000 Yen in 10-year installments. However, the winery did not prove to be a commercial success and went out of business by 1896.

The 1996 excavation have found the remains of the winery, two glass greenhouse buildings, a culvert with gravel, a drainage ditch, and an unopened wine bottle, along with porcelain and ceramic shards.

The Banshu Vineyard History Museum is located about 18 minutes by car from Tsuchiyama Station on the JR San'yo Main Line.

== See also ==
- List of Historic Sites of Japan (Hyōgo)
