= Japanese submarine Ro-14 =

History

Japan
- Name: Submarine No. 22
- Builder: Kure Naval Arsenal, Kure, Japan
- Laid down: 14 September 1918
- Launched: 31 March 1919
- Completed: 17 February 1921
- Commissioned: 17 February 1921
- Renamed: Ro-14 on 1 November 1924
- Stricken: 1 September 1933
- Renamed: Training Hulk No. 3063 on 7 March 1934
- Fate: Hulked 7 March 1934; Scrapped September 1948

General characteristics
- Class & type: Kaichū type submarine (K2 subclass)
- Displacement: 752 tonnes (740 long tons) surfaced; 1,019 tonnes (1,003.1 long tons) submerged
- Length: 70.10 m (230 ft 0 in) overall
- Beam: 6.10 m (20 ft 0 in)
- Draft: 3.68 m (12 ft 1 in)
- Installed power: 2,900 bhp (2,200 kW) (diesel); 1,200 hp (890 kW) (electric motor)
- Propulsion: Diesel-electric; 2 × Sulzer Mark II diesel engine, 75 tons fuel; 2 × electric motor; 2 x shafts
- Speed: 16.5 knots (30.6 km/h; 19.0 mph) surfaced; 8.5 knots (15.7 km/h; 9.8 mph) submerged
- Range: 6,000 nmi (11,000 km; 6,900 mi) at 10 knots (19 km/h; 12 mph) surfaced; 85 nmi (157 km; 98 mi) at 4 knots (7.4 km/h; 4.6 mph) submerged
- Test depth: 30 m (98 ft)
- Crew: 43
- Armament: 6 × 450 mm (18 in) torpedo tubes (4 x bow, 2 x external on upper deck); 10 x Type 44 torpedoes; 1 × 76.2 mm (3.00 in) gun

Ro-14, originally named Submarine No. 22, was an Imperial Japanese Navy Kaichū-Type submarine of the Kaichū II subclass. She was commissioned in 1921 and operated in the waters of Japan. She was stricken in 1933.

== Design and description ==
The submarines of the Kaichu II sub-class were larger and had a greater range than the preceding Kaichu I subclass, but they had the same power-plant, so their greater size resulted in a loss of some speed. They also had a modified conning tower, bow, and stern, and the stern was overhanging. They displaced 752 tonnes (740 long tons) surfaced and 1,019 tonnes (1,003.1 long tons) submerged. The submarines were 70.10 meters (230 ft 0 in) long and had a beam of 6.10 meters (20 ft 0 in) and a draft of 3.68 meters (12 ft 1 in). They had a diving depth of 30 meters (98 ft).

For surface running, the submarines were powered by two 1,450-brake-horsepower (1,081 kW) Sulzer Mark II diesel engines, each driving one propeller shaft. When submerged each propeller was driven by a 600-horsepower (447 kW) electric motor. They could reach 16.5 knots (31 km/h; 19 mph) on the surface and 8.5 knots (15.7 km/h; 9.8 mph) underwater. On the surface, they had a range of 6,000 nautical miles (11,000 km; 6,900 mi) at 10 knots (19 km/h; 12 mph); submerged, they had a range of 85 nmi (157 km; 98 mi) at 4 knots (7.4 km/h; 4.6 mph).

The submarines were armed with six 450 mm (18 in) torpedo tubes, four internal tubes in the bow and two external tubes mounted on the upper deck, and carried a total of ten Type 44 torpedoes. They were also armed with a single 76.2 mm (3.00 in) deck gun mounted aft of the conning tower.

== Construction and commissioning ==
Ro-14 was laid down as Submarine No. 22 on 14 September 1918 by the Kure Naval Arsenal at Kure, Japan. Launched on 31 March 1919, she was completed and commissioned on 17 February 1921.

== Service history ==
Upon commissioning, Submarine No. 22 was attached to the Kure Naval District — to which she remained attached throughout her career — and was assigned to Submarine Division 13 and to the Kure Defense Division. On 1 July 1921, she was reassigned to Submarine Division 15, remaining on duty in the Kure Defense Division. Submarine Division 15 served in the Kure Defense Division until 1 December 1921 and again from 1 December 1922 to 1 December 1923.

On 8 April 1924, Submarine No. 22 was conducting torpedo practice off Hiroshima, Japan, when mishandling of one of her torpedo tubes caused a torpedo to fire backward into the torpedo compartment, killing one crewman. She headed back to base, and either later the same day or on 9 April (sources disagree) collided with the Imperial Japanese Navy special service vessel Ondo, suffering no additional casualties but incurring damage so serious that she was in danger of sinking. However, she made port, was repaired, and returned to service.

Submarine No. 22 was renamed Ro-14 on 1 November 1924. On 1 December 1926, Submarine Division 15 began another assignment to the Kure Defense Division that lasted through the end of Ro-14′s active service.

Ro-14 was stricken from the Navy list on 1 September 1933. She remained moored at Kure as a hulk after that, and was renamed Training Hulk No. 3063 on 7 March 1934. She served on training duties through the end of World War II in August 1945, and was scrapped at Harima, Japan, in September 1948.
