= Inami, Hyōgo =

Inami 稲美町
- Town
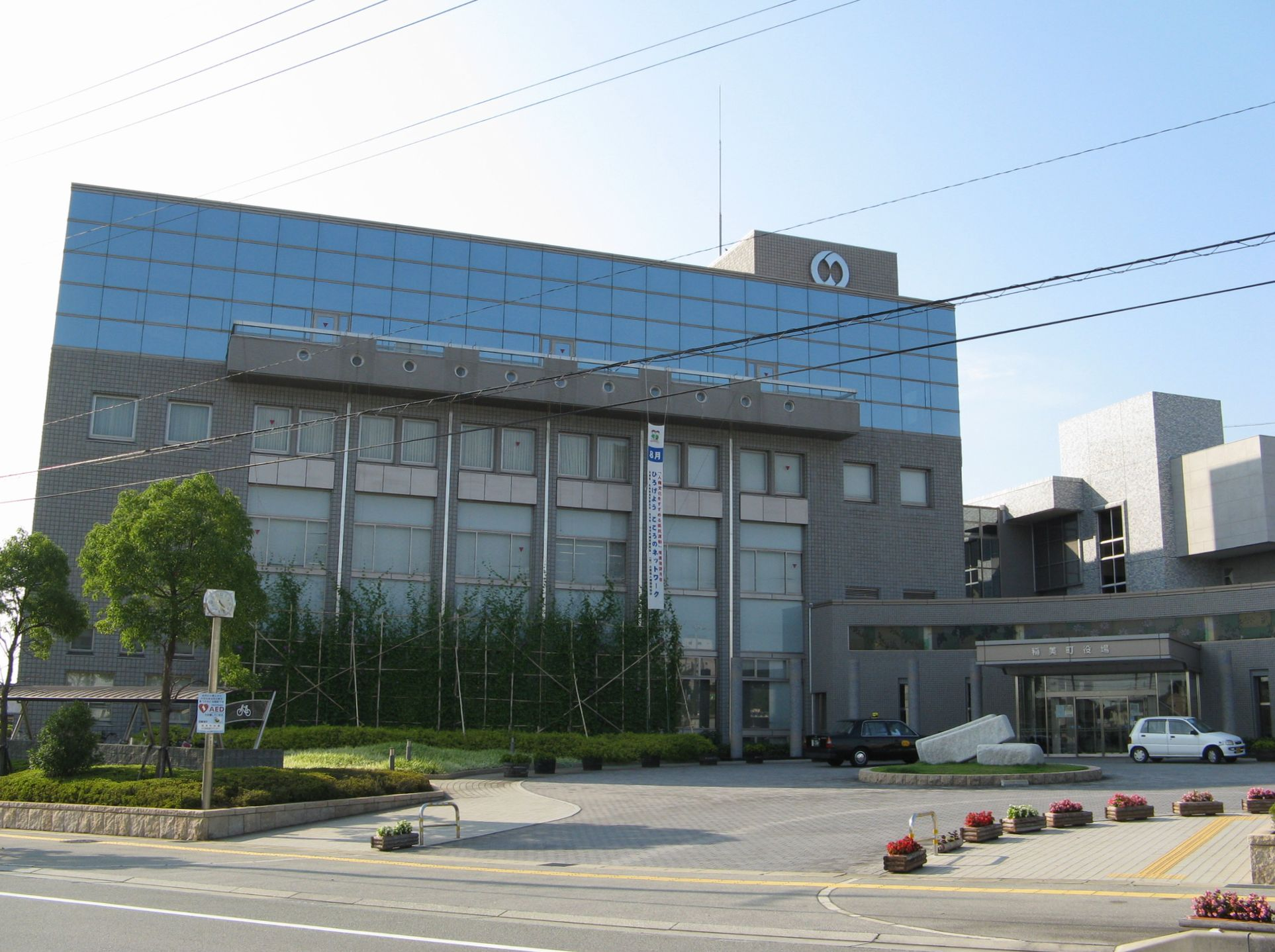
- Inami Town Hall

- Flag Emblem

- Location of Inami in Hyōgo Prefecture

- Location in Japan
- Coordinates: 34°45′N 134°55′E
- Country: Japan
- Region: Kansai
- Prefecture: Hyōgo
- District: Kako
- Established: March 31, 1955

Government
  - Mayor: Tetsuro Nakayama

Area
  - Total: 34.92 km^{2} (13.48 sq mi)

Population (May 1, 2022)
  - Total: 30,622
  - Density: 876.9/km^{2} (2,271/sq mi)
- Time zone: UTC+09:00 (JST)
- City hall address: 1-1 Kunioka, Inami-chō, Kako-gun, Hyōgo-ken 675-1115
- Website: Official website
- Symbols
- Flower: Cosmos
- Tree: Ilex integra

Inami (稲美町, Inami-chō) is a town located in Kako District, Hyōgo Prefecture, Japan. As of 1 May 2022, the town had an estimated population of 30,622 in 12843 households and a population density of 880 persons per km^{2}. The total area of the town is 34.92 square kilometres (13.48 sq mi).

== Geography ==
Inami is located in the southern part of Hyogo prefecture and belongs to the Kobe metropolitan area. It is located on the Innanno Plateau between the Kakogawa and Akashi Rivers.

=== Neighbouring municipalities ===
Hyōgo Prefecture

- Akashi
- Kakogawa
- Kobe
- Miki

=== Climate ===
Inami has a Humid subtropical climate (Köppen Cfa) characterized by warm summers and cool winters with light snowfall. The average annual temperature in Inami is 15.3 °C. The average annual rainfall is 1462 mm with September as the wettest month. The temperatures are highest on average in August, at around 26.6 °C, and lowest in January, at around 4.6 °C.

== Demographics ==
Per Japanese census data, the population of Inami grew slowly until the 1970s, until the 2000s and has since leveled off.

Historical population
Year	Pop.	±%
1920	13,730	—
1930	14,418	+5.0%
1940	15,152	+5.1%
1950	18,240	+20.4%
1960	18,525	+1.6%
1970	21,140	+14.1%
1980	27,609	+30.6%
1990	30,603	+10.8%
2000	32,054	+4.7%
2010	31,036	−3.2%

== History ==
The area of the modern town of Inami was within ancient Harima Province, and as a place name is mentioned in the Nara period Man'yōshū. In the Edo Period, the area was part of the holdings of Himeji Domain. Following the Meiji restoration, the villages of Kakoshin, Mori and Tenman and Hase were created within Kako District, Hyōgo with the creation of the modern municipalities system on April 1, 1889. The three villages merged on March 31, 1955, to form the town of Inami.

== Government ==
Inami has a mayor-council form of government with a directly elected mayor and a unicameral town council of 14 members. Inami, together with the town of Harima, contributes one member to the Hyogo Prefectural Assembly. In terms of national politics, the town is part of Hyōgo 14th district of the lower house of the Diet of Japan.

== Economy ==
Inami has a mixed economy of agriculture and light manufacturing.

== Education ==
Inami has five public elementary schools and two public middle schools operated by the town government and one public high school operated by the Hyōgo Prefectural Department of Education. The prefecture also operates a special education school for the handicapped.

== Transportation ==
=== Railway ===
Inami is not served by any passenger railway lines. The nearest stations are Tsuchiyama Station in Harima or Higashi-Kakogawa Station in Kakogawa, Hyōgo, both on the JR West San'yō Main Line.

=== Highway ===
Inami is not located on any National Expressway or National Highway.

== Local attractions ==
- Banshū Winery ruins, National Historic Site
