= Toshizō =

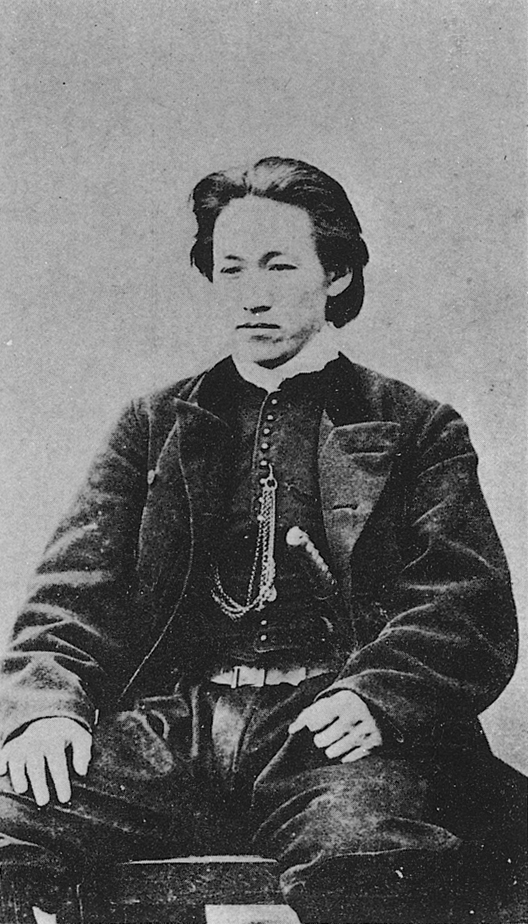
- Toshizo Hijikata (1835–1869), Japanese swordsman and Shinsengumi commander
- Pronunciation: toɕidzoɯ (IPA)
- Gender: Male

Origin
- Origin: Japanese
- Meaning: Different meanings depending on the kanji used

Other names
- Alternative spelling: Tosizo (Kunrei-shiki) Tosizo (Nihon-shiki) Toshizō, Toshizo, Toshizou, Toshizoh (Hepburn)

Toshizō is a masculine Japanese given name.

== Written forms ==
Toshizō can be written using different combinations of kanji characters. Here are some examples:

- 敏三, "agile, three"
- 敏蔵, "agile, store up"
- 敏造, "agile, store up"
- 俊三, "talented, three"
- 俊蔵, "talented, store up"
- 俊造, "talented, create"
- 利三, "benefit, three"
- 利蔵, "benefit, store up"
- 利造, "benefit, create"
- 寿三, "long life, three"
- 寿蔵, "long life, store up"
- 寿造, "long life, create"
- 年三, "year, three"
- 年蔵, "year, store up"
- 年造, "year, create"
- 歳三, "age, three"

The name can also be written in hiragana としぞう or katakana トシゾウ.

== Notable people with the name ==
- Toshizo Hijikata (土方 歳三, 1835–1869), Japanese swordsman and Shinsengumi commander.
- Toshizo Ido (井戸 敏三, born 1945), Japanese politician.
- Toshizo Nishio (西尾 寿造, 1881–1960), Japanese general.
