= ÆON Kakogawa =

ÆON KAKOGAWA
- イオン加古川店

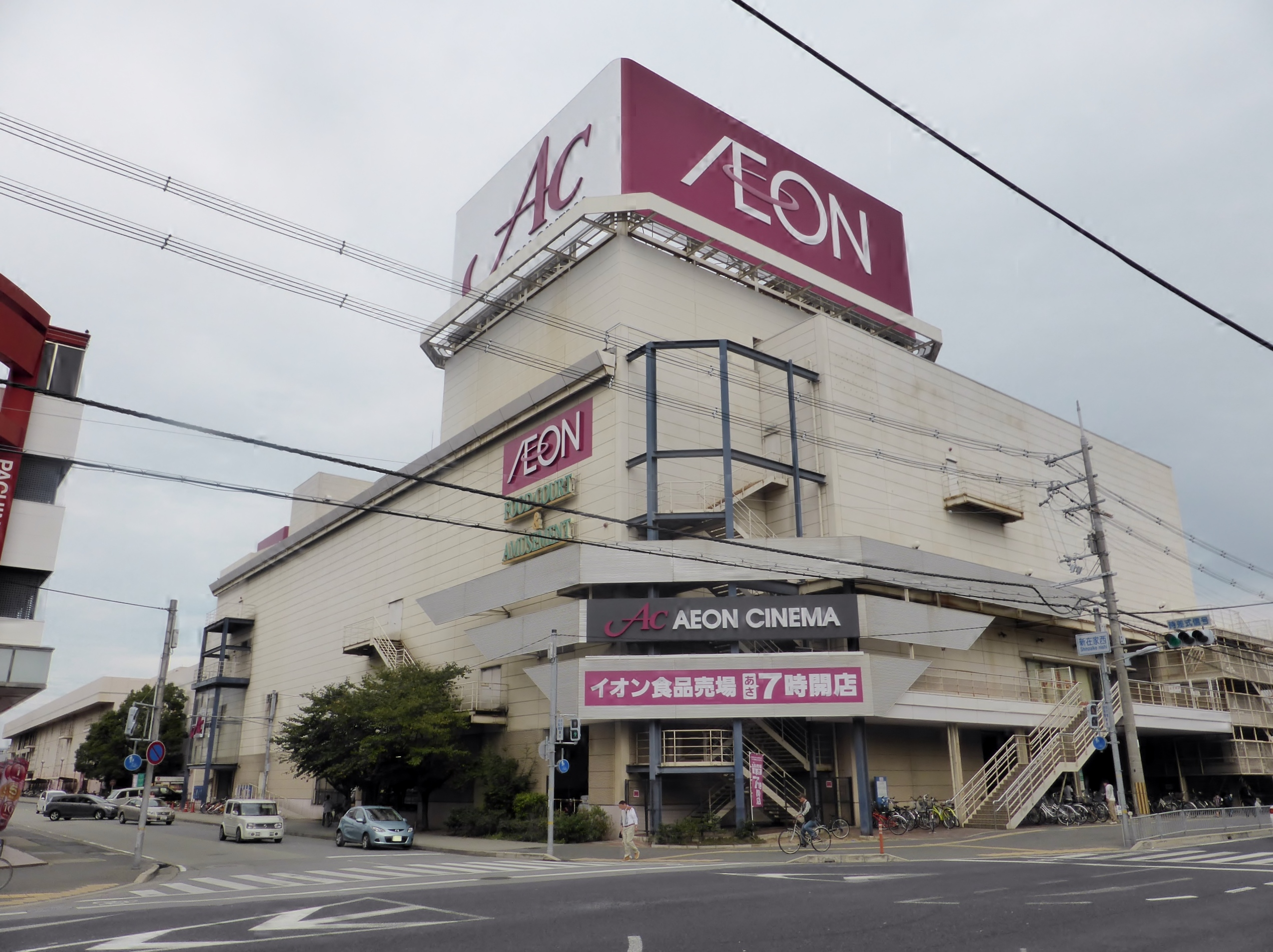
- Location: Kakogawa, Hyogo, Japan
- Coordinates: 34°44′57″N 134°51′46″E
- Address: 615-1 Shinzaike, Hiraokacho, Kakogawa-shi, Hyogo, 675-0101 Japan
- Opened: 26 October 1982
- Previous names: Kakogawa SATY
- Developer: Nichii
- Owner: ÆON Retail
- Num. of anchor tenants: 1
- Floors: 3
- Parking: 2088
- Public transit: Higashi-Kakogawa Station
- Website: Official website (English); Official website (Japanese)

ÆON Kakogawa (イオン加古川店, Ion Kakogawaten), formerly known as Kakogawa SATY, is a large shopping mall in Kakogawa, Hyogo, Japan. It's a part of Japanese Æon Group chain of shopping centers.

== Description ==
ÆON Kakogawa is located in Higashi-Kakogawa area of Kakogawa City. The nearest station is Higashi-Kakogawa Station.

ÆON Kakogawa has two buildings, the main building and the annex. The main building has a supermarket, a 100-yen shop, clothes shops, restaurants. Also, it has Kakogawa City Hall Branch Office.

The annex building has a movie theater, ÆON Cinema Kakogawa. The annex building also has amusement arcade operated by Taito and a Piloti parking lot.

In addition, ÆON Kakogawa also has two multistorey car parks.

== History ==
ÆON Kakogawa opened as Nichii Kakogawa in 1982. Nichii Kakogawa was operated by Nichii Co. Ltd. (Note: Nichii Co., Ltd changed its name to MYCAL in 1996.) Nichii Kakogawa changed its name to Kakogawa SATY in 1994.

The current name has been used since 1st March 2011, when MYCAL and ÆON Retail merged and all of SATY stores renamed.

== Surrounding area ==
- Japan National Route 2
- Don Quijote Kakogawa

== See also ==
- List of shopping malls in Japan
