= Motohiko Saitō =

Japanese politician (born 1977)

- 斎藤 元彦
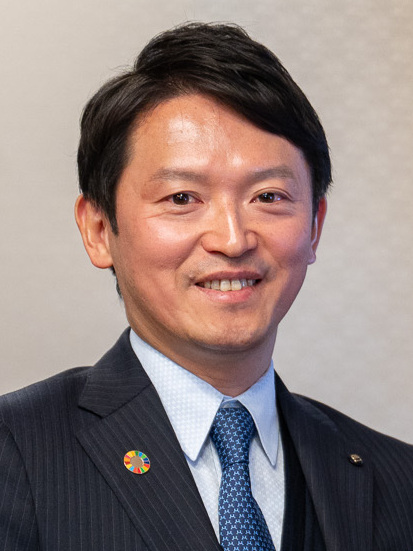
- Saitō in 2024

Governor of Hyōgo Prefecture
- Incumbent
- Assumed office 1 August 2021 (Note: Office vacated from 30 September to 19 November 2024)
- Monarch: Naruhito
- Preceded by: Toshizō Ido

Personal details
- Born: 15 November 1977 (age 48) Kobe, Hyōgo, Japan
- Party: Independent
- Education: University of Tokyo
- Website: Saitō Motohiko

Motohiko Saitō (斎藤 元彦, Saitō Motohiko; born 15 November 1977) is a Japanese politician and the 53rd and 54th governor of Hyōgo Prefecture in Japan.

== Overview ==
Amid the controversies surrounding the Saitо̄ administration, on 19 September 2024, the Hyōgo Prefectural Assembly submitted a motion of no confidence, which was unanimously passed by 86 votes. Subsequently, Saitо̄ had to choose between dissolving the Assembly or leaving office. On 26 September, Saitо̄ announced that he would not dissolve the assembly and would instead run for reelection after he was removed from office. On 30 September, Saitо̄ was required to vacate the position. Saitо̄ was reelected in the 2024 Hyogo gubernatorial election that took place on 17 November 2024.

The head of the prefectural government bureau for a region called Nishiharima committed suicide on 7 July 2024, after presenting an internal whistleblower document criticising Governor Saitо̄'s actions in office. After that, the Japanese media focused on Saitо̄, and discussion and criticism of the Saitо̄ administration increased.

== Hyōgo Prefectural Government internal whistleblowing document issue ==
The issue stemmed from a document in which a former senior prefectural official acted as a whistleblower against the governor and others, raising concerns about Saitō's alleged power harassment and the receipt of gifts from companies. Furthermore, the issue escalated after one of the staff members committed suicide.

=== Background ===
On 12 March 2024, the Director of the Nishiharima Prefectural Bureau, Yasuhide Watase (then 60 years old), anonymously distributed a document titled "Regarding the Illegal Acts of Hyogo Governor Motohiko Saitō" to prefectural assembly members, media outlets, and the prefectural police department. Saitō testified to the Special Investigation Committee with a strong mandate under Article 100 of the Local Autonomy Law that he had obtained the document from "a private individual" on 20 March.

According to prefectural assembly officials, the lieutenant governor and the head of the Prefectural Personnel Department visited without an appointment the Nishiharima Prefectural Bureau in Kamigori Town, Akō District on 25 March and allegedly confiscated Watase's computer. Watase was scheduled to retire at the end of March, but his retirement was canceled on March 27 when the Hyogo Prefecture announced that his actions were highly likely to warrant disciplinary action.

At a regular press conference on the same day, Saitō stated, "The document contains numerous false claims, which raises legal issues such as the loss of credibility and defamation of the staff." He added, "Fabricating and circulating a document full of lies during work hours is unacceptable behavior for a public servant. We are proceeding with legal measures, including filing a criminal complaint and an accusation."

On 2 April, Saitō revealed that he would bring in lawyers to investigate Watase's disciplinary actions and denied establishing a third-party committee. Furthermore, he avoided commenting on the veracity of the allegation of power harassment against him; said, "it would be better to explain after thoroughly examining the entire situation." Watase then appealed on 4 April to the prefecture's Public Interest Whistleblowing System and reported the allegation to the Prefectural Administration Reform Division, which oversees the System, and the Division was tasked with investigating the allegation.

On 16 April, the department head of the prefecture's Bureau of Industry and Labor admitted to receiving one of the gifts mentioned in the document. Hoping that the governor would promote Hyōgo Prefecture's products, he requested that the manufacturer send him the product. The product was delivered, but after consulting with the secretarial department, he decided to return it, and it was stored unopened in the warehouse.

On 20 April, the former General Affairs Division Chief, who was mentioned in Watase's whistleblowing document as having developed depression due to the stress from a series of misconduct and covering up, committed suicide. The news of his death was not posted on the employees' site until 23 April. Saitō explained at a press conference on 24 April that the Chief's death was not disclosed due to the wishes of the bereaved family. It was also reported that an attempt by colleagues to collect an orphan education fund for the deceased's children was stopped by prefectural executives.

On 24 April, a prefectural assembly member Maki Maruo (Independent) submitted a request to Saitō for the establishment of a third-party organization to investigate the contents of the document and conduct a staff survey on the existence of power harassment. On 26 April, Saitō reiterated his negative stance on establishing a third-party organization, stating, "The personnel department is conducting with lawyers a detailed investigation."

On 7 May, the prefecture government announced that Watase had been placed on a three-month suspension as a disciplinary measure.

After conducting interviews with all the prefectural employees and business personnel named in the document, the prefectural government determined that essential elements of the allegation were not factual, and that the document constituted defamation and potentially libel. Additionally, the head of the Bureau of Industry and Labor, who admitted to receiving the gift, was reprimanded.

While stating that "We cannot disclose the investigation methods," the prefecture asserted that a sufficient and necessary investigation had been conducted through interviews with relevant parties by the personnel department. They concluded that "we believe the trust in the prefectural government has been restored, and the establishment of a third-party committee is unnecessary."

On 9 May, the Hyōgo Prefectural Citizens' Coalition, a caucus composed of members from the Constitutional Democratic Party and other prefectural assembly members, requested the prefectural government to establish a third-party organization to conduct an investigation. At the press conference, a prefectural assembly member criticized, "Before the investigation even began, the governor declared the document to be 'all lies' and 'groundless,' and then only his subordinates conducted an internal investigation."

On 14 May, Saitō stated that he was considering the establishment of a third-party organization, shifting his previous stance on external investigation.

On 15 May, the ruling party of the prefectural government, the Liberal Democratic Party (LDP), held a general conference to discuss the establishment of a third-party agency and an Article 100 Special Investigation Committee (hereafter the Article 100 Committee). Opinions were divided within the party regarding the Article 100 Committee, and no consensus was achieved.

On 16 May, a meeting of representatives from each party in the prefectural assembly was held, and LDP, Komeito, and the Japanese Communist Party requested the prefectural government to establish a third-party agency.

On 20 May, the Japan Innovation Party also agreed to support the establishment of a third-party agency.

On 21 May, with unanimous agreement from all parties, Speaker Hyoe Naito (LDP) requested Saitō to establish a third-party agency, and Saitō officially announced a reinvestigation through the third-party agency.

On 5 June, while denying the accusation of power harassment, Saitō partially admitted the factuality of the statement in the whistleblowing report for yelling at the staff who made him get out of the car and walk 20 meters at the business trip destination, saying that he provided necessary guidance within the scope of his duties.

On 7 June, Lieutenant Governor Yasutaka Katayama pleaded with the chairperson of the assembly steering committee, Fujimoto Hyakuo, to refrain from establishing the Article 100 Committee because he would resign.

On 13 June, the prefectural assembly approved the establishment of the Article 100 Committee by a majority vote.

The established Article 100 Committee "Special Committee on Whistleblowing Document Issues," was composed of 15 members, with Kenichi Okutani of LDP serving as chairperson.

On 14 June, the first meeting of the Article 100 Committee was held.

On 20 June, during a regular press conference, Saitō explained each item in the document for the first time and denied all seven allegations.

On 27 June, the second meeting of the Article 100 Committee was held.

It was confirmed at the meeting that Watase would be summoned to testify as a witness at the third meeting scheduled for 19 July.

Subsequently, an opinion was raised to disclose other documents remaining on the confiscated computer at the Article 100 Committee. In response, Watase's representative submitted a request to the committee chairperson not to disclose any materials unrelated to the purpose of the investigation.

On the night of 7 July, Watase's family filed a missing person report with the prefectural police. When the police searched for him, Watase was found dead at a relative's house in Himeji City. It is believed to be a suicide.

On 19 September 2024, the Hyōgo Prefectural Assembly submitted a motion of no confidence, which was unanimously passed by 86 votes. Subsequently, Saitо̄ had to choose between dissolving the Assembly or leaving office. He then announced on 26 September that he would not dissolve the assembly and would instead run for reelection after he is removed from office. On 30 September, Saitо̄ was required to vacate the position. Saitо̄ was reelected in the 2024 Hyogo gubernatorial election that took place on 17 November 2024.

== Notes ==
Political offices
Preceded by Toshizō Ido (2001 - 2021)	Governor of Hyōgo Prefecture; From：2021–	Succeeded by
