= Higashi-Kakogawa Station =

Railway station in Kakogawa, Hyōgo Prefecture, Japan

Higashi-Kakogawa Station 東加古川駅
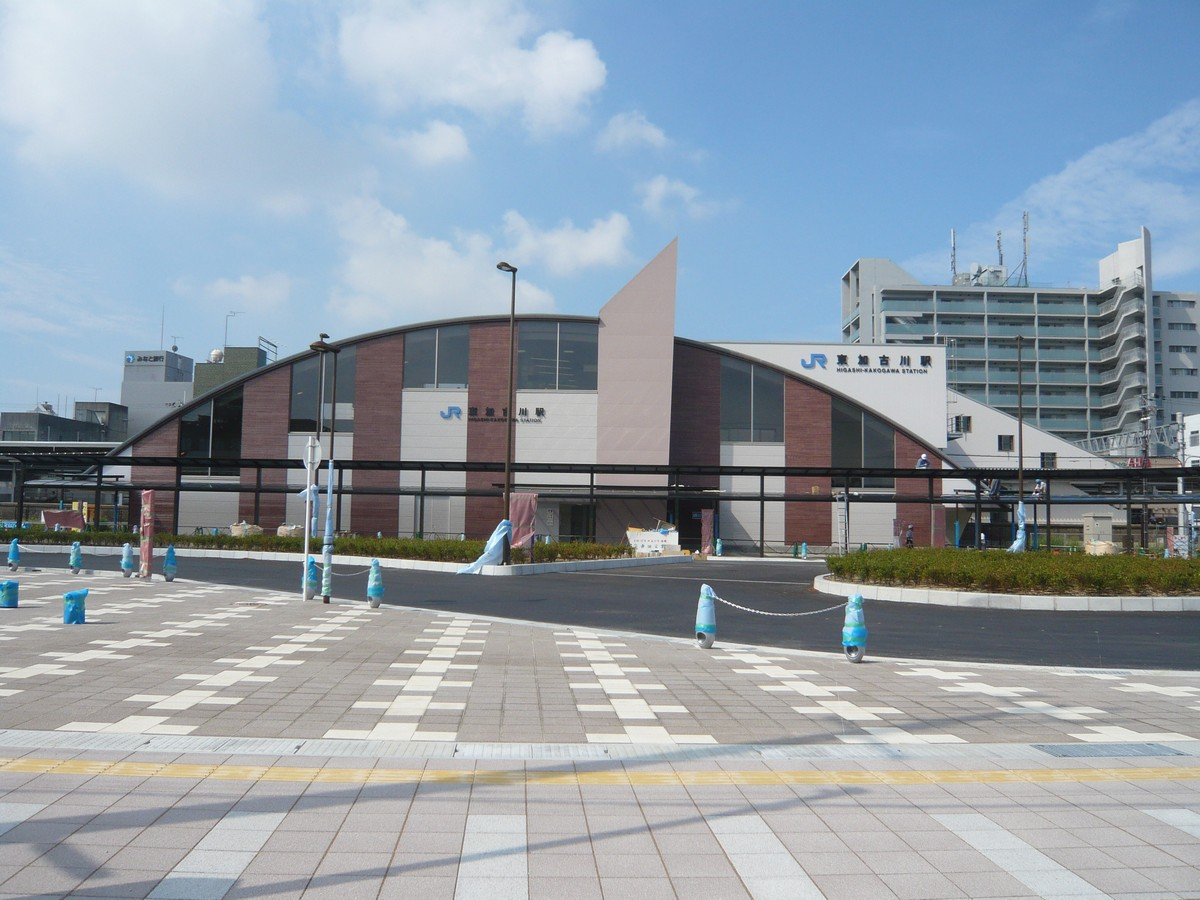
- Higashi-Kakogawa Station, August 2012

General information
- Location: Hiraokacho Shinzaike, Kakogawa-shi, Hyōgo-ken 675-0101; Japan
- Coordinates: 34.7457°N 134.8693°E
- Owner: West Japan Railway Company
- Operator: West Japan Railway Company
- Line: San'yō Main Line
- Distance: 35.5 km (22.1 miles) from Kobe
- Platforms: 1 side + 1 island platform
- Connections: Bus stop

Construction
- Structure type: Ground level, Elevated
- Accessible: Yes

Other information
- Status: Staffed (Midori no Madoguchi)
- Station code: JR-A78
- Website: Official website

History
- Opened: 1 October 1961

Passengers
- FY2019: 13,820 daily

Services
Preceding station	JR West	Following station
Kakogawa towards Himeji	JR Kōbe Line Rapid Local (some services)	Tsuchiyama towards Ōsaka
Location
- Location within Hyōgo Prefecture Location within Japan

Higashi-Kakogawa Station (東加古川駅, Higashi-Kakogawa-eki) is a passenger railway station located in the city of Kakogawa, Hyōgo Prefecture, Japan, operated by the West Japan Railway Company (JR West).

== Lines ==
Higashi-Kakogawa Station is served by the JR San'yō Main Line, and is located 35.5 kilometers from the terminus of the line at Kobe and 68.6 kilometers from Osaka.

== Station layout ==
The station consists of one ground-level side platform and one island platform connected by an elevated station building. The station has a Midori no Madoguchi staffed ticket office

=== Platforms ===
1	■ San'yō Main Line	for Kakogawa and Himeji
2	■ San'yō Main Line	for Sannomiya and Osaka

== History ==
Higashi-Kakogawa Station opened on October 1, 1961. With the privatization of the Japan National Railways (JNR) on April 1, 1987, the station came under the aegis of the West Japan Railway Company.

Station numbering was introduced in March 2018 with Higashi-Kakogawa being assigned station number JR-A78.

== Passenger statistics ==
In fiscal 2019, the station was used by an average of 13,820 passengers daily

== Surrounding area ==
- Japan National Route 2
- Kakogawa Municipal Hiraoka Junior High School
- Kakogawa City Hiraoka Minami Junior High School
- Hyogo Prefectural Higashi Harima High School
- ÆON Kakogawa

== See also ==
- List of railway stations in Japan
