= Tsuchiyama Station =

Railway station in Harima, Hyōgo Prefecture, Japan

Tsuchiyama Station 土山駅
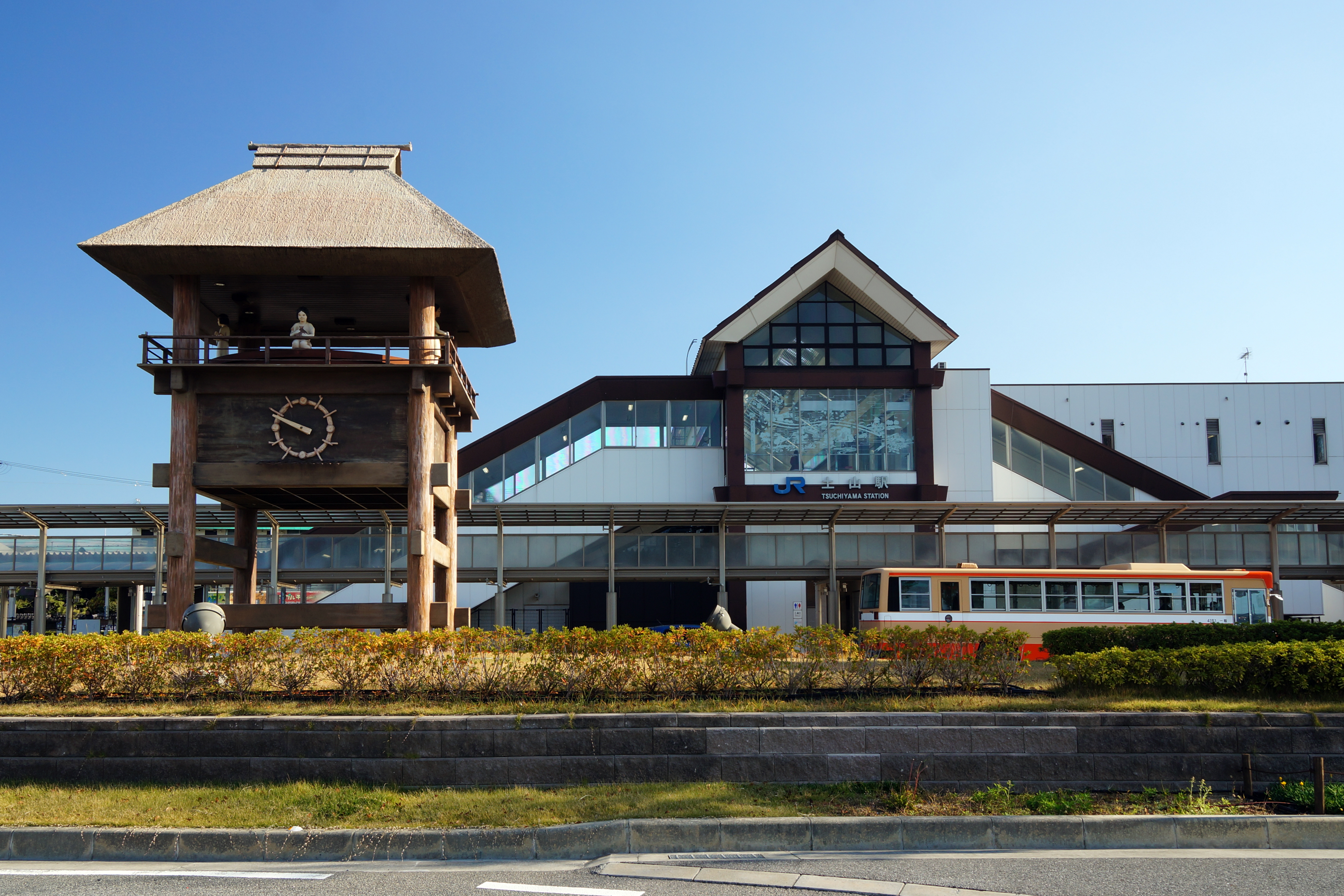
- Tsuchiyama Station, November 2013

General information
- Location: 1616-2 Nozoe, Harima-chō, Kako-gun, Hyōgo-ken 675-0151; Japan
- Coordinates: 34.7205°N 134.8890°E
- Owner: West Japan Railway Company
- Operator: West Japan Railway Company
- Line: San'yō Main Line
- Distance: 32.3 km (20.1 miles) from Kobe
- Platforms: 1 side + 1 island platforms
- Connections: Bus stop

Construction
- Structure type: Ground level
- Accessible: Yes

Other information
- Status: Staffed (Midori no Madoguchi)
- Station code: JR-A77
- Website: Official website

History
- Opened: 23 December 1888

Passengers
- FY2019: 14,201 daily
Location
- Location within Hyōgo Prefecture Location within Japan

Tsuchiyama Station (土山駅, Tsuchiyama-eki) is a passenger railway station located in the town of Harima, Kako District, Hyōgo Prefecture, Japan, operated by the West Japan Railway Company (JR West).

== Lines ==
Tsuchiyama Station is served by the JR San'yō Main Line, and is located 32.2 kilometers from the terminus of the line at Kobe and 65.3 kilometers from Osaka.

== Station layout ==
The station consists of one ground-level side platform and one ground-level island platform connected by an elevated station building. The station has a Midori no Madoguchi staffed ticket office. Track 1 serves westbound trains to Kobe and Ōsaka while track 3 serves eastbound trains to Himeji; track 2 is bi-directional and handles trains going to either terminus depending on the time of day.

=== Platforms ===
1	■ San'yō Main Line	for Sannomiya and Osaka
2, 3	■ San'yō Main Line	for Kakogawa and Himeji

== Adjacent stations ==
«	Service	»
JR West
Sanyō Main Line (JR Kobe Line)
Limited Express Super Hakuto: Does not stop at this station
Limited Express Hamakaze: Does not stop at this station
Commuter Limited Express Rakuraku Harima: Does not stop at this station
Special Rapid Service: Does not stop at this station
Uozumi	Local including Rapid Service	Higashi-Kakogawa

== History ==
Tsuchiyama Station opened on 23 December 1888. With the privatization of the Japan National Railways (JNR) on 1 April 1987, the station came under the aegis of the West Japan Railway Company.

Station numbering was introduced in March 2018 with Tsuchiyama being assigned station number JR-A77.

== Passenger statistics ==
In fiscal 2019, the station was used by an average of 14,201 passengers daily

== Surrounding area ==
- Hyogo Prefectural Archaeological Museum
- Harima Onaka Ancient Village
- Harima Town Folk Museum

== See also ==
- List of railway stations in Japan
