= Kazumi Inamura =

Japanese politician (born 1972)

- 稲村 和美

Mayor of Amagasaki
- In office 12 December 2010 – 1 December 2022
- Preceded by: Aya Shirai
- Succeeded by: Shin Matsumoto

Member of the Hyōgo Prefectural Assembly
- In office 11 June 2003 – 6 October 2010
- Constituency: Amagasaki City

Personal details
- Born: 10 November 1972 (age 53) Nara, Japan
- Party: Greens Japan
- Education: Kobe University
- Website: www.inamura-kazumi.com

Kazumi Inamura (稲村 和美, Inamura Kazumi; born 10 November 1972) is a Japanese politician. She was the mayor of Amagasaki from 13 December 2010 until 1 December 2022. She is member of the Greens Japan political party and was its co-president from 2008 to 2010. She was a student at the University of Kobe during the 1995 Great Hanshin earthquake. She was a member of the Hyogo Prefectural Assembly.
