= Toshizō Ido =

Japanese politician

- 井戸 敏三
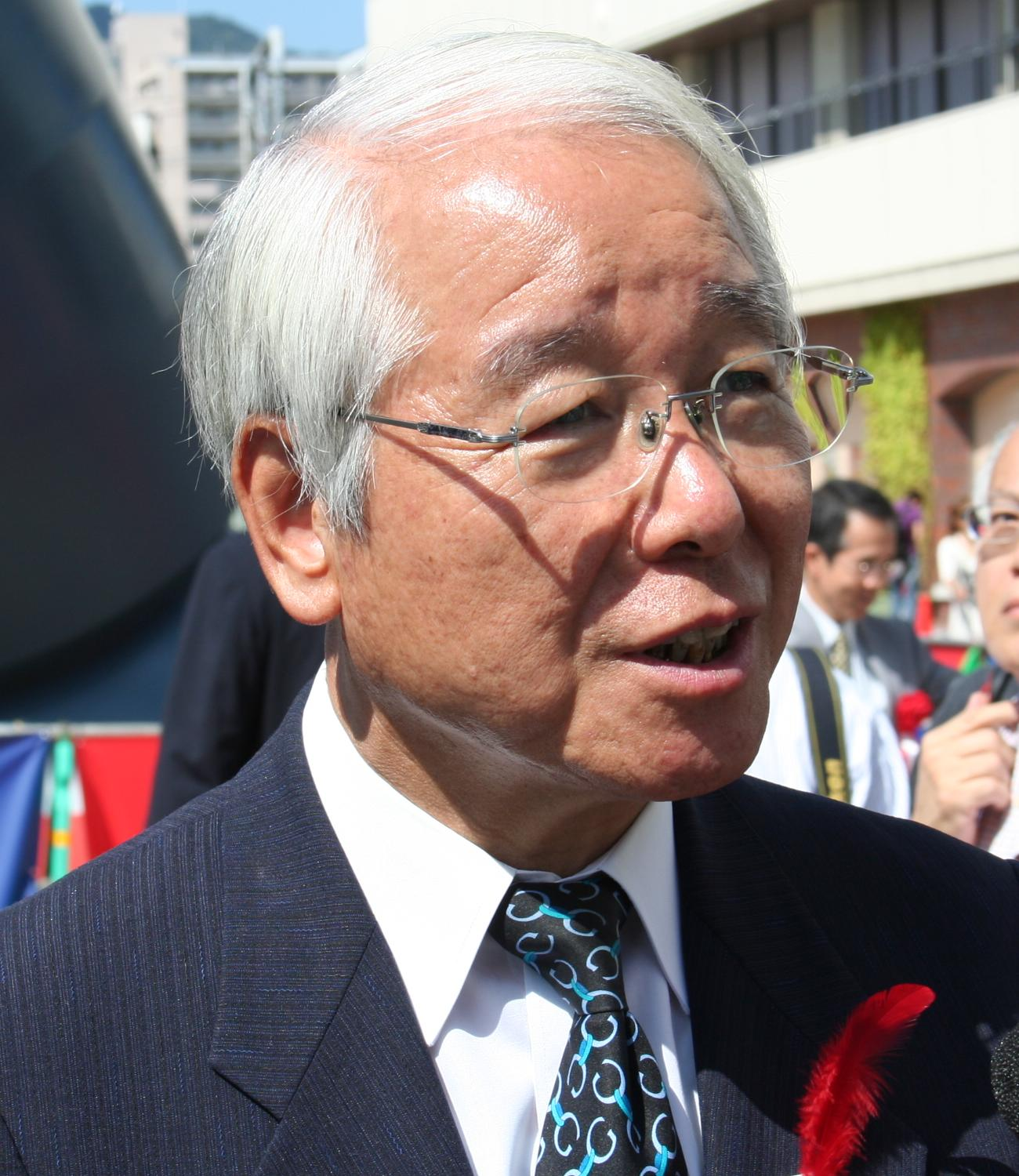

Governor of Hyōgo Prefecture
- In office 1 August 2001 – 31 July 2021
- Monarchs: Akihito; Naruhito
- Preceded by: Toshitami Kaihara
- Succeeded by: Motohiko Saitō

Vice Governor of Hyōgo Prefecture
- In office 1 August 1996 – 31 July 2001
- Succeeded by: Tomio Saito

Personal details
- Born: 10 August 1945 (age 81) Tatsuno, Hyōgo, Japan
- Education: University of Tokyo; Hibiya High School
- Awards: Order of Merit of Schleswig-Holstein (12 May 2016)
- Website: Toshizō Ido

Toshizō Ido (井戸 敏三, Ido Toshizō; born 10 August 1945) is a Japanese politician and the 48th - 52nd governor of Hyōgo Prefecture in Japan. He became the Governor of Hyōgo Prefecture in 2001, a position he held for 5 terms over 20 years. He is a native of Tatsuno, Hyōgo and graduate of the University of Tokyo, he joined the Ministry of Home Affairs in 1968.

== 2009 election ==
Gov. Toshizo Ido was re-elected in 2009 to a third term. Ido, backed by the LDP, New Komeito, and the Social Democratic Party, appeared to have easily defeated Kotaro Tanaka, 60, endorsed by the Japanese Communist Party. During the campaign, Ido publicized his achievements in promoting reconstruction following the 1995 Great Hanshin earthquake and tackling the swine flu outbreak.

Political offices
Preceded by Toshitami Kaihara (2001 - 2021)	Governor of Hyōgo Prefecture; From：2001 - 2021	Succeeded by Motohiko Saitō
