= Kako District =

District in Hyōgo Prefecture, Japan

Coordinates: 34.7501°N 134.919°E

Kako district.

Kako (加古郡, Kako-gun) is a district located in Hyōgo Prefecture, Japan.

== Towns and villages ==
- Harima
- Inami
