= Harima, Hyōgo =

Harima 播磨町
- Town
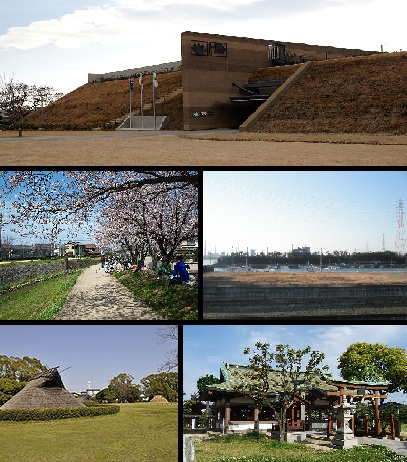
Hyogo Prefectural Museum of Archaeology
Kise River	Ae Fishing Port
Onaka Site	Ae Jnja
- Flag Emblem

- Location of Harima in Hyōgo Prefecture

- Location in Japan
- Coordinates: 34°43′N 134°52′E
- Country: Japan
- Region: Kansai
- Prefecture: Hyōgo
- District: Kako

Government
  - Mayor: Hiroko Shimizu (since July 2006)

Area
  - Total: 9.13 km^{2} (3.53 sq mi)

Population (May 1, 2022)
  - Total: 34,735
  - Density: 3,800/km^{2} (9,850/sq mi)
- Time zone: UTC+09:00 (JST)
- City hall address: Higashi-honjō 1-5-30, Harima-chō, Kako-gun, Hyōgo-ken 675-0182
- Website: Official website
- Symbols
- Flower: Chrysanthemum
- Tree: Pinus

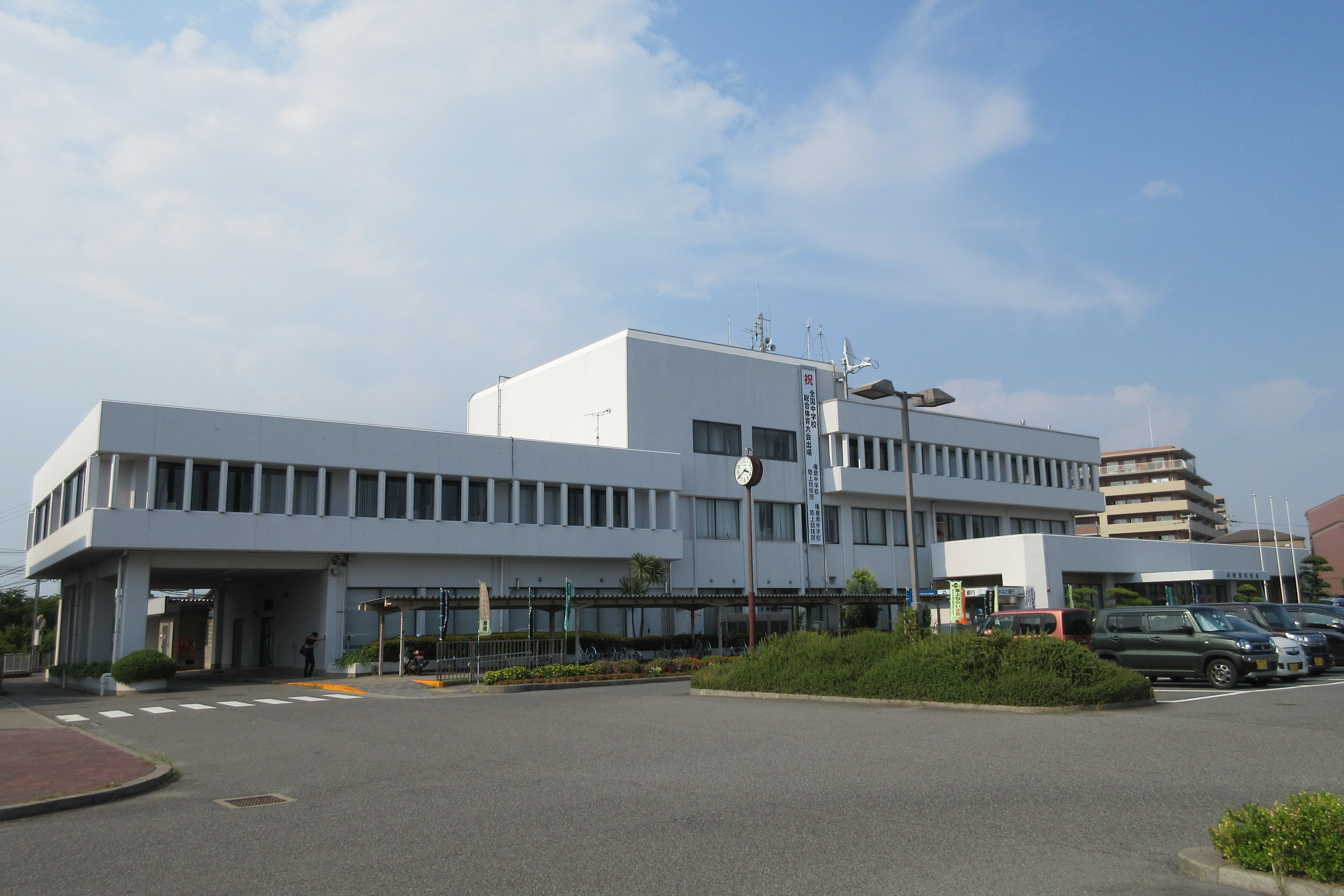
Harima Town Hall

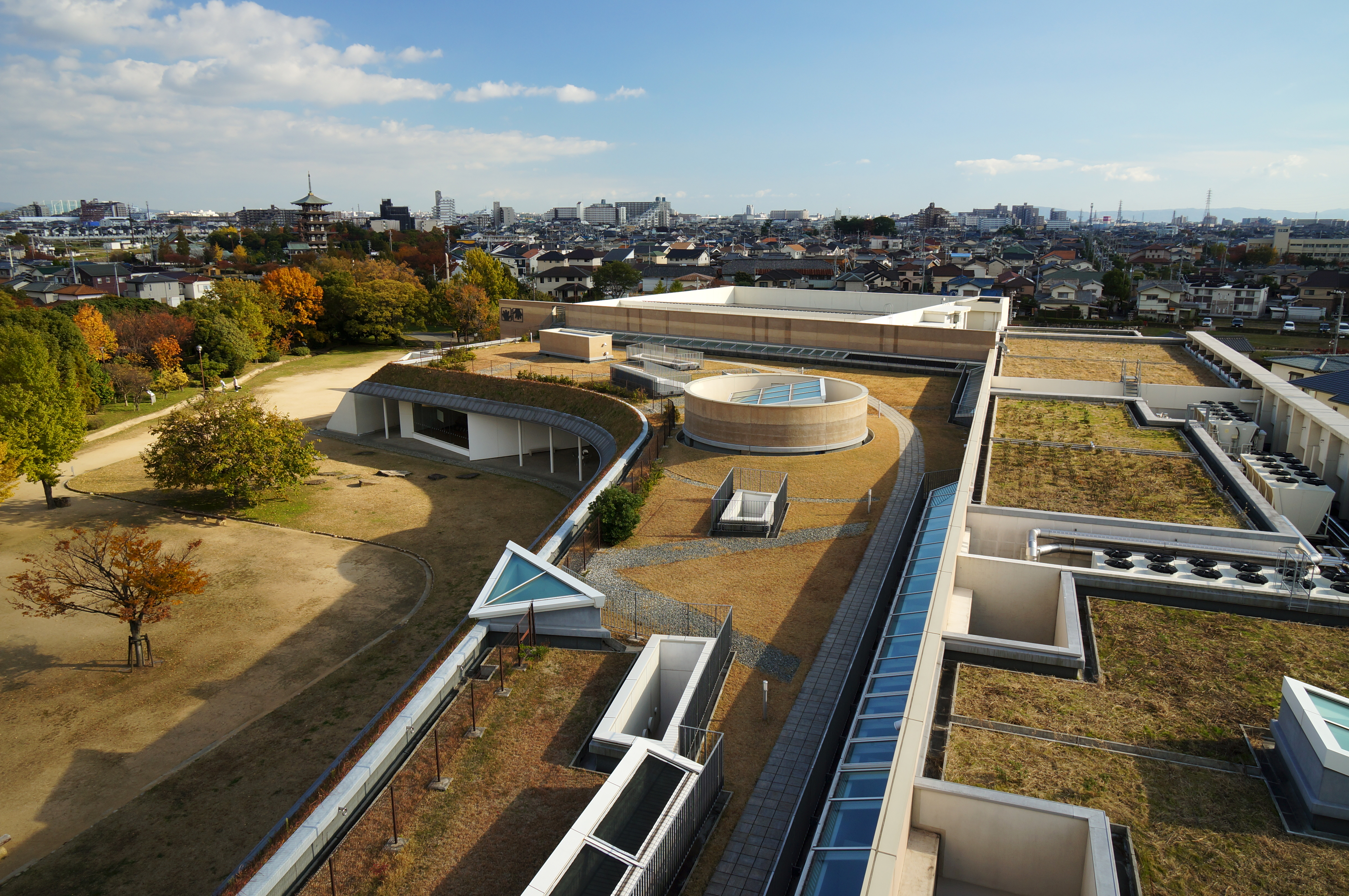
Hyogo Prefectural Museum of Archaeology

Harima (播磨町, Harima-chō) is a town located in Kako District, Hyōgo Prefecture, Japan. As of 1 May 2022, the town had an estimated population of 34,735 in 15410 households and a population density of 3800 persons per km^{2}. The total area of the town is 9.13 square kilometres (3.53 sq mi). The town is named after Harima Province, one of the old provinces of Japan. The town flower is the chrysanthemum.

== Geography ==
Harima is located in the southeastern part of the Harima district in Hyōgo prefecture, in the Kisegawa River basin south of the Innanno plateau. The south borders the Seto Inland Sea, and there are two man-made island, Niijima and Higashiniijima which form approximately 30% of the town area.

=== Neighbouring municipalities ===
Hyōgo Prefecture

- Akashi
- Kakogawa

=== Climate ===
Harima has a Humid subtropical climate (Köppen Cfa) characterized by warm summers and cool winters with light snowfall. The average annual temperature in Harima is 15.7 °C. The average annual rainfall is 1527 mm with September as the wettest month. The temperatures are highest on average in August, at around 26.86 °C, and lowest in January, at around 5.2 °C.

== Demographics ==
Per Japanese census data, the population of Harima expanded rapidly in the 1970s and has since leveled off.

Historical population
Year	Pop.	±%
1920	4,688	—
1930	5,159	+10.0%
1940	5,758	+11.6%
1950	8,062	+40.0%
1960	8,814	+9.3%
1970	13,116	+48.8%
1980	26,527	+102.2%
1990	30,813	+16.2%
2000	33,766	+9.6%
2010	33,192	−1.7%

== History ==
The area of the modern town of Harima was within ancient Harima Province. In the Edo Period, the area was part of the holdings of Himeji Domain. Following the Meiji restoration, the village of Ae (阿閇村) was created within Kako District, Hyōgo with the creation of the modern municipalities system on April 1, 1889. Due to conflicts arising in merger negotiations with Akashi and Kakogawa, the village has opted to remain independent, and was raised to town status on April 1, 1962.

== Government ==
Harima has a mayor-council form of government with a directly elected mayor and a unicameral town council of 14 members. Karima, together Inami, contributes one member to the Hyogo Prefectural Assembly. In terms of national politics, the town is part of Hyōgo 14th district of the lower house of the Diet of Japan.

=== Harima resident charter ===
Harima-chō is an ancient village full of history. Our town flourishes on natural gifts and ancestral efforts. We established this charter to make our town a more peaceful and worthwhile hometown.

We grow flowers and trees to make the town prosperous.
We respect one another and have opportunities to meet eye-to-eye.
We enjoy working and we create happy homes.
We are familiar with sports and we stay in shape.
We deepen our knowledge and develop a wealth of culture.

(Town charter, since March 27, 1982)

In addition a charter update was written for Harima on April 28, 1989.

The following is a translation of the text.

We are living in a time of admirable history and favorable natural resources and we hope to lead a good life with a happy heart. All of us take care of each other's lives and rights. We learn together, and get in touch as comrades, and therefore widen our sympathetic circles. Now, we will get back to the basics of human respect, and we declare, "Let's live together in Harima, a town of friendly people." We aim to make a bright town where everyone lives in a happy family and greets the 21st century with pride.

In Harima: We will raise consciousness about human rights and get rid of all discrimination.
We will make progress in learning and acquire the knowledge to live a just life.

We will deepen our understanding of each other and make warm human relationships.

== Economy ==
Heavy chemical industry factories operate on artificial islands (Niijima and Higashiniijima) that occupy 30% of the town area, forming a part of the Harima Seaside Industrial Zone. Urbanization is considerably more advanced than in other counties, and is comparable to the neighboring cities of Akashi and Kakogawa. The area of cultivated land has been steadily decreasing year by year due to development of residential land with an increasing number of residents commuting to either municipality.

== Education ==
Harima has four public elementary schools and two public middle schools operated by the town government and one public high school operated by the Hyōgo Prefectural Department of Education.

== Transportation ==
=== Railway ===
JR West – San'yō Main Line

- Tsuchiyama

Sanyo Electric Railway - Main Line

- Harimachō

=== Highway ===
- National Route 250

== Sister cities ==
- Lima, Ohio, United States, since March 16, 1999
- Heping, Tianjin, China, since March 25, 1993

=== Harima International Friendship Association ===
The Harima International Friendship Association (HIFA) maintains sister-city relationships with Lima, Ohio, in the United States and Heping, Tianjin, in China. Activities include yearly cultural exchanges between the people of Harima and their sister-city partners.

== Local attractions ==
=== Harima historical sites ===
- Onaka Ancient Village Remains (National Historical Site)
  In the Yayoi period, the location of the Kakogawa River running through the center area of the Harima region made the area prosperous. The remains found resemble the Old Stone Culture. The Onaka Village Remains were discovered by three members of the Harima Junior High School Archaeology Club in June 1962. The remains are located on the south edge of a Pleistocene epoch plateau 13 metres (43 feet) above sea level, on the east edge of the Kakogawa river.
  The remains, including a 44,000 m^{2} (473,612 sq ft) residential site, are characteristic of the mid-Yayoi Era to the mid-Kofun period (A.D. 200–400) The excavation of the site also revealed a broken mirror reaffirming early trade between China and Japan. This site provides important information on the early formation of Japanese society and community structures.

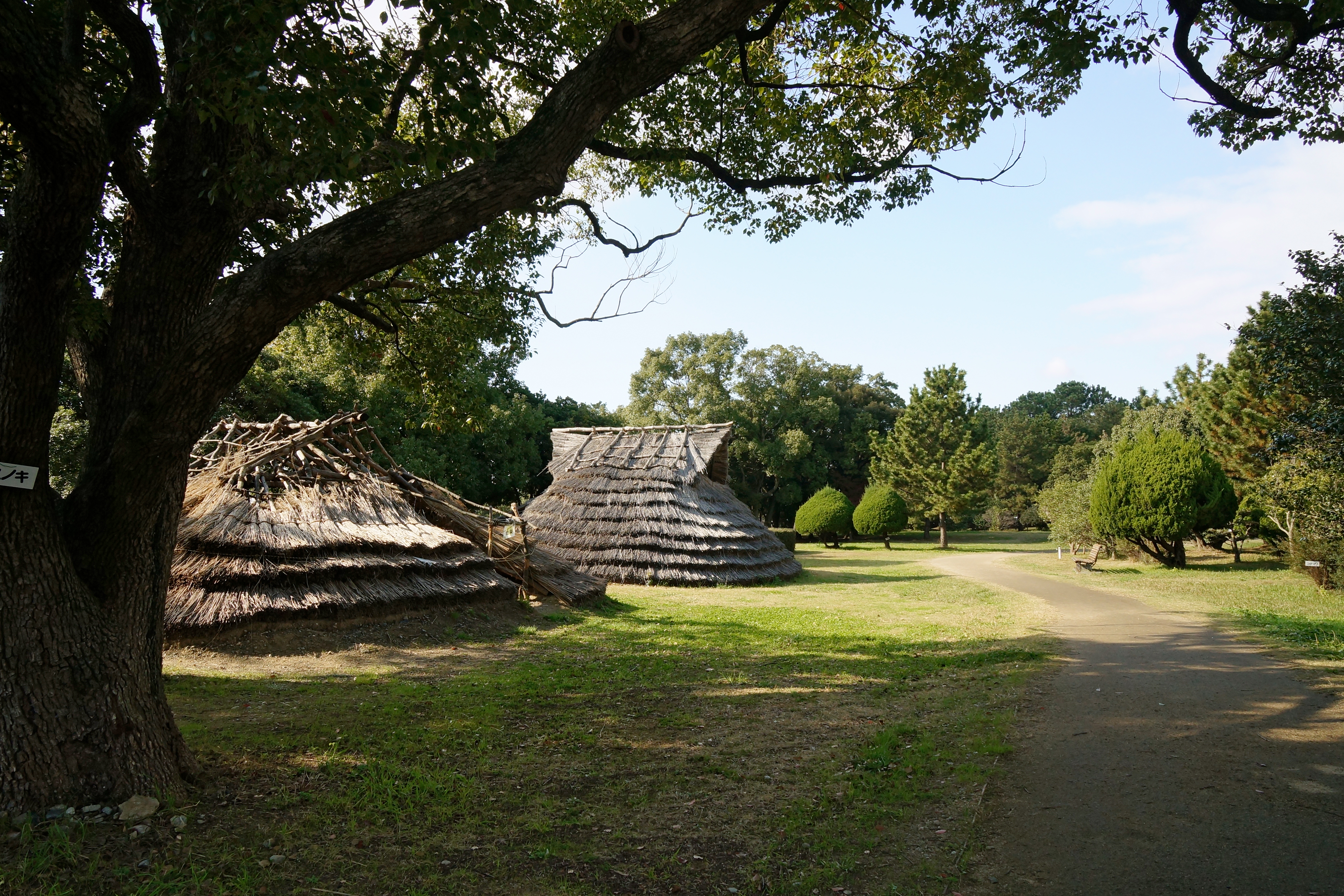
Onaka Ancient Village Site

- Naikōkamon Kyōhen (Mirror fragment) (Town Designated Cultural Asset)
  The mirror was excavated from the Onaka Ancient Village Remains residence site. The mirror is presumed to have been made in the late-Han Era in China. The mirror is 2.5 cm (1.0 in) in width, and would have a perfect shape of 21.2 cm (8.3 in) if fully restored. It was intentionally divided and burnished to create a flat face, with two bored holes for hanging. This is a highly valued archaeological specimen.
- The sitting statue of Yakushi-nyōrai (Town Designated Cultural Asset)
  This statue serves as one of the oldest and most precious statues of the Buddha. It is of a joined block construction 140 cm (55 in) in height, on a draping-robe style pedestal. The statue's robe is simple and the carvings are shallow to give it great elegance. Part of the statue's face, its right arm, and the medicine pot in its left hand show marks from past repairs. It is presumed to have been built at the end of the Heian period.
- Enman-ji Temple Shaka-juryoku-zenshizō (Town Designated Cultural Asset)
  Enman-ji Temple features an image of the Buddha between two Bodhisattvas in the center of sixteen guards (gods). It is painted on a silk screen with an oath and is dated to 1395. A restoration took place in 1465. There is also a restoration of an epiphany in 1680 on the back of the silk. It has the principal image of the Buddha from three old villages, Imazato, Iwamitsu, and Futago. It is valued for its ability to show how people believed in gods in the 14th century.

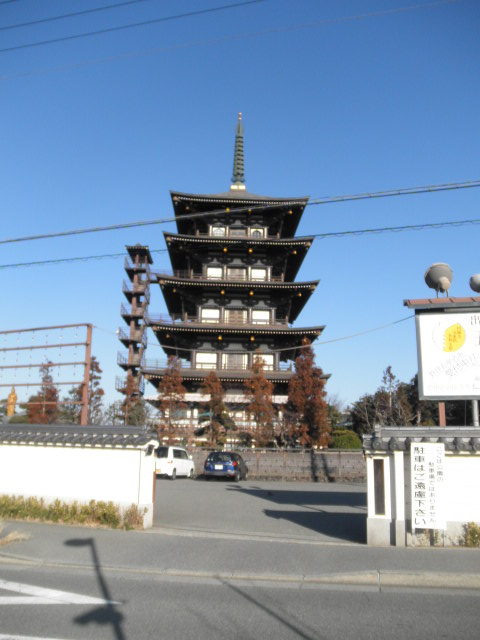
A five-story pagoda built in Enman Temple

- Renge-ji Temple "Raihan" (Town Designated Cultural Asset)
  The "Raihan" is a compact platform on which the chief priest of the Buddhist Temple sits to worship. An old record was left inside the platform written in Indian ink telling the history of the "Raihan." It also includes a description of Ikeda Terumasa's wife, Tokuhime's large procession to see her father, Ieyasu Tokugawa, the first shōgun of the Tokugawa Era. The record provides insight into the social life in the Tokugawa period.
- Moon-watching diaries: Records for moon watching in the Edo period (Town Designated Cultural Asset)
  These three journals handed down in the Kawabata community in the Nozoe village were kept yearly without interruption for about 150 years starting in 1720. They give general accounts of life in the community. These journals are authentic, and provide valuable historical records to study sociological aspects of the people of the time.
- Ae Shrine (Prefecture Designated Cultural Asset)
  The main shrine structure consists of two pillars at the front, running north and south, and a thatched roof. The front edges of the buildings are connected with corridor bridges. This style of architecture with for main shrine buildings linked together by bridges is rarely seen elsewhere. This unique feature lead to itself Prefectural Designated Cultural Asset status.
- Ae Shrine camphor tree in Futago (Town Designated Cultural Asset)
  This camphor tree is thought to have been planted when the Ae Futago shrine was established in 1688, and is worshiped as a holy tree to this day. This 300-year-old tree is the oldest in town. It is 16 m in height and 5 m in circumference.
- Harima Elementary School camphor tree (Town Designated Cultural Asset)
  This memorial tree was planted in 1900 as one of eight camphor trees to commemorate the move of Harima Elementary School, previously named Ae Elementary School, to its present location. In order to expand the school playground, the other trees were cut down. The only remaining, more than 100 years old, tree is 12 m in height and 2.9 m in circumference.
- Hokyoin Monument (Town Designated Cultural Asset)
  This monument is made of granite and is 157 centimeters in height from its stone foundation. The erosion of the monument by time and elements have made it impossible to read the inscriptions on the stone. However, based on carving techniques it is presumed to have been built at the beginning of the Muromachi Era. It is only one of a few stone work examples found in Harima.
- Atagozuka Burial Ground (Prefecture Designated Cultural Asset)
  The only round burial ground in Harima with a moat. It was built in the mid-Kofun period, and has been worshiped by people as "Atago-san" since ancient times. Its name comes from the shrine on top of the burial ground where Atago Bodhisattva is enshrined. The grounds are 22 by 23 metres (72 by 75 feet). The top is 15.3 m (50.2 ft) above sea level while the bottom is 13.1 m (43.0 ft) above sea level. It is 2.2 m (7 ft 2.6 in) high with a moat 4.5 m (14.8 ft) in width.
- Rishu Woodcut Sutra (Town Designated Cultural Asset)
  The Rishu Woodcut Sutra is a set of four double-sided Rishu woodcuts inscribed with the name of the year Benmei 19(1487) and the Buddhist history. The letters are engraved on each thick cherry plank. The unique, but esoteric, Buddhist text meant to lead to enlightenment is engraved in Rishu. A summary of the Muryojuin history from ancient times to 1487 was included in the history. These woodcuts are a valuable research tool in the study of Buddhist history in Japanese feudal times.
- The Shinyu Waterway—Built by Denbei Imazato
  In the years before the building of this waterway in Myōreki 1 (1655) the people suffered from an insufficient water supply. This was because only small ponds and wells provided the main source of water for rice field irrigation. There was no rain before the rice-planting season of Shōō 3 (1654). A long spell of dry weather in August resulted in no harvest or rice seed for a future crop. Denbei Imazato, then chief of the Komiya area, called the chiefs of the 23 villages together. After coming to an agreement, he helped plan the building of a flood control channel from Saijo Hiramatsu Gokanoi Sluice (now Kakogawa) to Okie Komiya. Denbei then presented the plan to the lord of the domain and received permission to begin construction. The project started in 1655 and was completed in March 1656. The total length of the waterway was 13 km (8 mi), and 164,000 workers were used in its construction. The improved irrigation system allowed water to reach some 6 square kilometres (2 square miles) of field area. It was developed using the Gokanoi Sluice, an ancient type of irrigation system, and it was subsequently named the Shinyu Waterway.

=== Folk culture ===
- The Shishimai of Komiya Lion Dance (Town Designated Intangible Folk Cultural Asset)
  The Lion dance is performed with two people. It is a ritual of devotion to the Komiya temple god Enoki Daimyojin from the Kan'ei era. It uses Taijin music. On September 23 of the lunar calendar ten dances are performed. Two typical examples are the 'Botan,' and 'Shiokumi' styles of dance.

=== Cultural facilities ===
- Harima Archaeological Materials Museum
  This museum exhibits archaeological materials excavated in the Onaka archaeological site. Special exhibitions, lectures, and classes are provided to visitors to experience ancient traditions and methods.

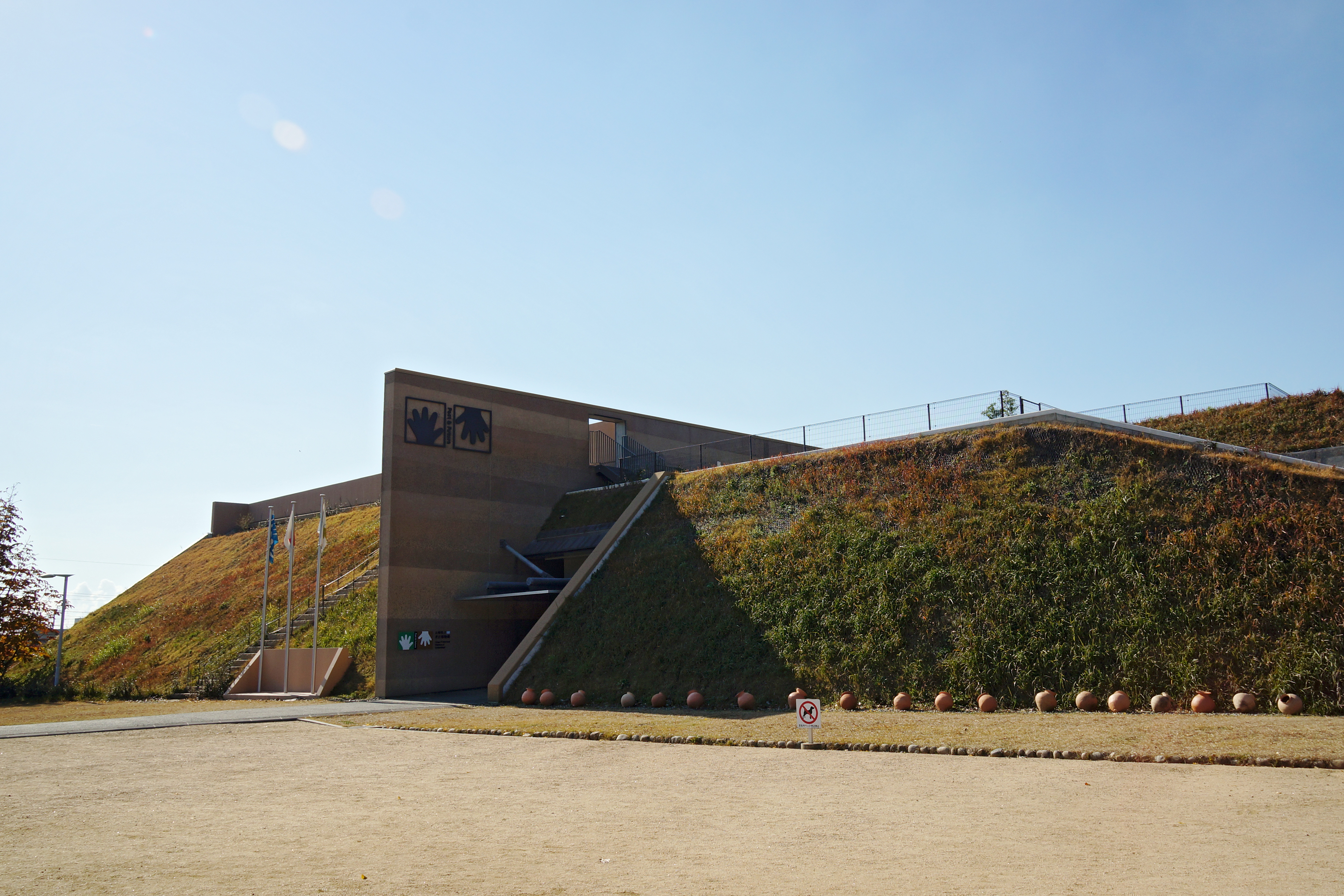
Hyogo Prefectural Museum of Archaeology in Harima

- Harima Library
  The library features a collection of about 120,000 books. The library also offers reference service, story telling gatherings, lectures on literature and handicraft classes.

== Noted people from Harima ==
- Joseph Hiko—Father of the Japanese newspaper
  Joseph "Hikotaro" Hiko (1837–1897), Joseph Heco, was born in Komiya, Harima. He was rescued at the age of 13, in 1850 from a shipwreck on Eiriki-maru. He was then taken to America by an American merchant. He was the first Japanese person to be naturalized as an American citizen in 1858. He was baptized as a Christian and chose the name "Joseph Hiko". He was instrumental as a translator in forming the "Treaty of Friendship" between Japan and the United States. He also helped send delegations from the Tokugawa shogunate to the United States.
  In addition, he published the first Japanese newspaper, Kaigai Shinbun, in 1864. It contained news of the world and a short overview of American history. Hiko's nickname "The Father of the Japanese Newspaper" is a result of this achievement.
  Hiko met U.S. President Lincoln in 1861, and came to know democracy at that time. He also met President Franklin Pierce. He had a long and successful career as a statesman, commercial agent, and translator. He visited Harima three times, and set up a tombstone for his parents. This tombstone is located at Rengeji Temple in Honjo. It is now commonly referred to as "The Tombstone with European letters".
  Hiko had a mixed relationship with his home country of Japan. Many Japanese people were not happy with the new outside foreign influences of the world coming into Japan. He was buried in Aoyama, Tokyo in the foreign section of the cemetery, as he was an American citizen. However, he has become quite a celebrated figure in Harima in recent years.
- Masaki Sumitani (H.G.) — Japanese Comedian, Actor, and Talent
  Masaki Sumitani was born December 18, 1975, in Harima. He was a student at Harima Junior High School, and later attended Kakogawa Higashi Senior High school. His stage name is Razor Ramon HG, but is more commonly known as H.G. (Hard Gay). He appears on a variety of Japanese television shows.
