= Kinki Health Welfare University =

Coordinates: 34°58′45″N 134°44′20″E

- 近畿医療福祉大学
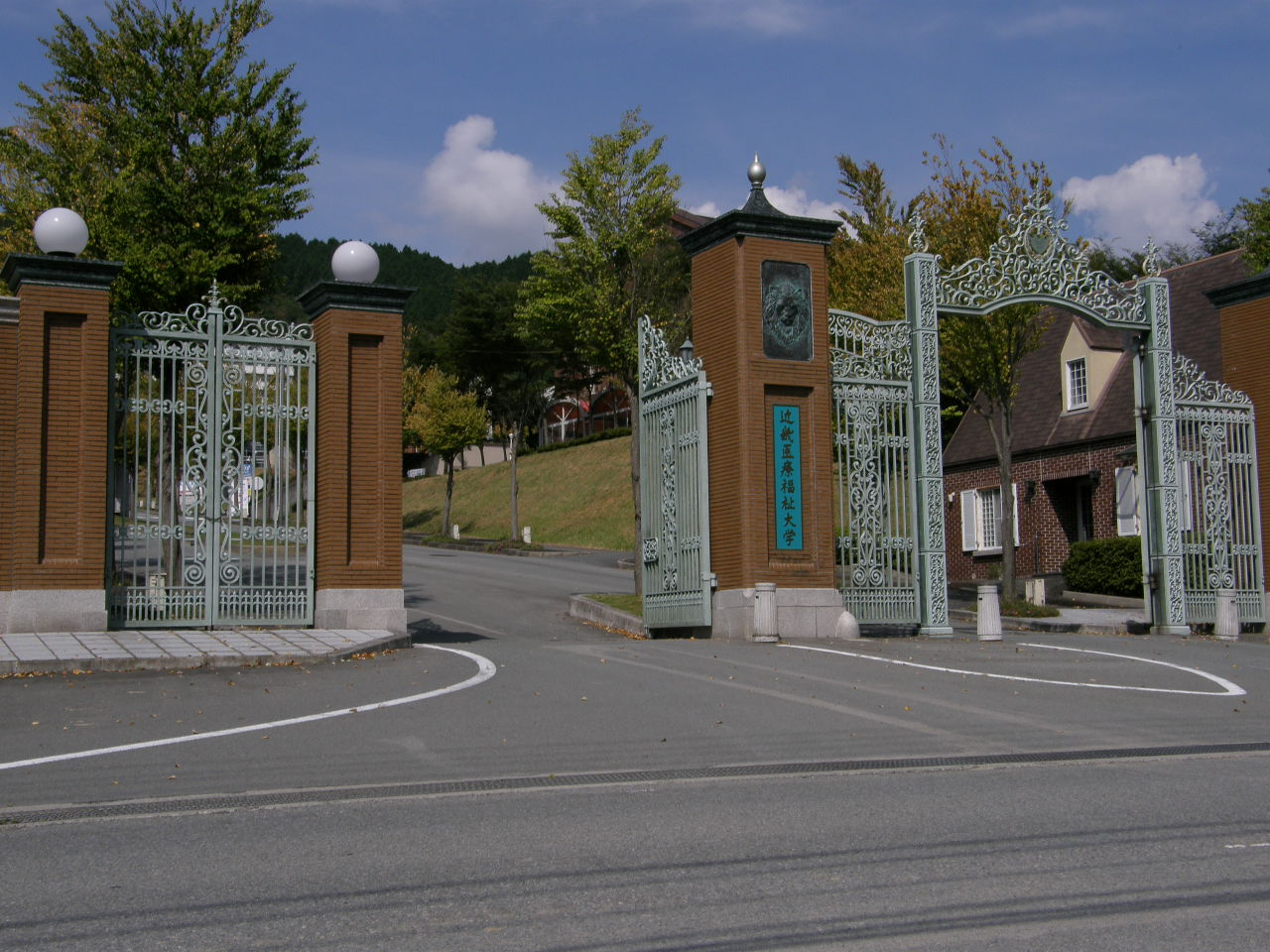
- Type: Private
- Location: Fukusaki, Hyōgo, Japan
- Website: www.kinwu.ac.jp

Kinki Health Welfare University (近畿医療福祉大学, Kinki iryō fukushi daigaku) is a private university in the town of Fukusaki in Hyōgo Prefecture, Japan. The school was first founded as a junior women's college in 1973. In 2000 it became a co-ed four-year college.
