= Mount Shirakami =

Mountain in Hyōgo Prefecture, Japan

- 白髪山
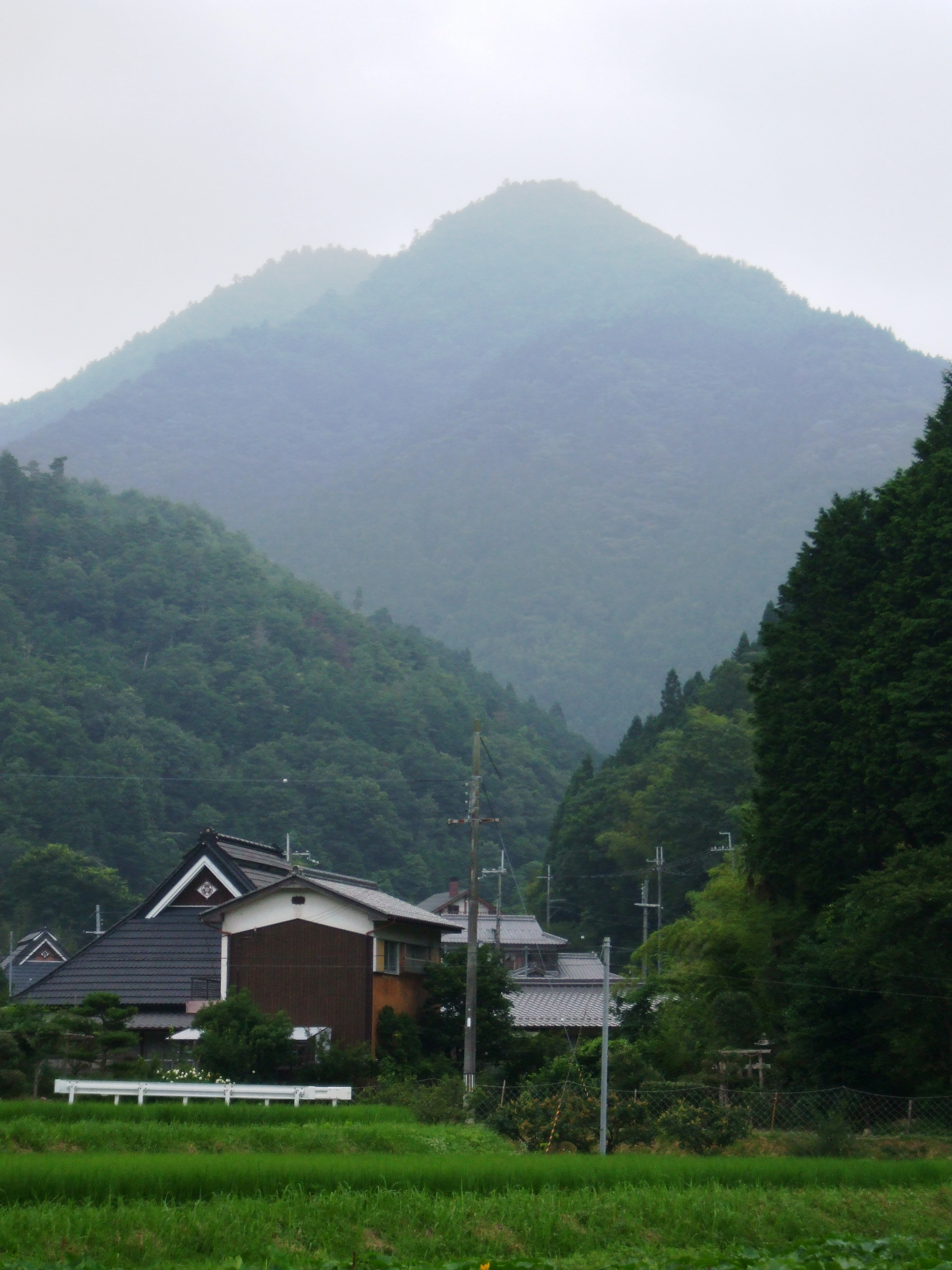
- A View of Mt. Shirakami from Sumiyama

Highest point
- Elevation: 721.8 m (2,368 ft)
- Coordinates: 35°2′N 135°8′E

Naming
- Language of name: Japanese
- Pronunciation: Japanese: [ɕiɾakamijama]

Geography
- Location: Himeji, Hyōgo in Japan
- Parent range: Tamba Highland

Geology
- Mountain type: Ruins

Mount Shirakami (白髪山, Shirakami-yama) is a 721.4 meter high mountain in Sasayama, Hyōgo, Japan. Another name is Tanba-Fuji, literally, "Mount Fuji in Tanba Province". This mountain is one of the Hyōgo 50 mountains, and Kinki 100 mountains.

== Outline ==
Mount Shirakami is one of the most famous mountains in Tamba Highland, well known for its good shape like the famous Mount Fuji. This mountain is an independent mountain in this area, and visitors can enjoy the almost 360-degree panorama view from the top. This mountain is the source of Mukogawa River.

== Religion and History ==
Mount Shirakami was an object of worship of the people in this area with Mount Matsuo. This mountain is located near an old route from Osaka to Tajima Province, or Kyoto to Harima Province, so the good-shape of the mountain has attracted many people in the history. After the Battle of Ichi-no-Tani in the 12th century, a legend said that one of a wife of the lost samurai of Heike, lived on the foot of the mountain and a found her husband.

== Access ==
- Furuichi Station of Fukuchiyama Line
- Sasayamaguchi Station of Fukuchiyama Line
