= Matsuo =

Matsuo may refer to:

== Places ==
- Matsuo, Chiba
- Matsuo, Iwate
- Mount Matsuo
- Matsuo Station (disambiguation)
- Siege of Matsuo
- Matsuo mine

== Other uses ==
- Matsuo (name)
