= Shimotaki Station =

Railway station in Tamba, Hyōgo Prefecture, Japan

Shimotaki Station 下滝駅
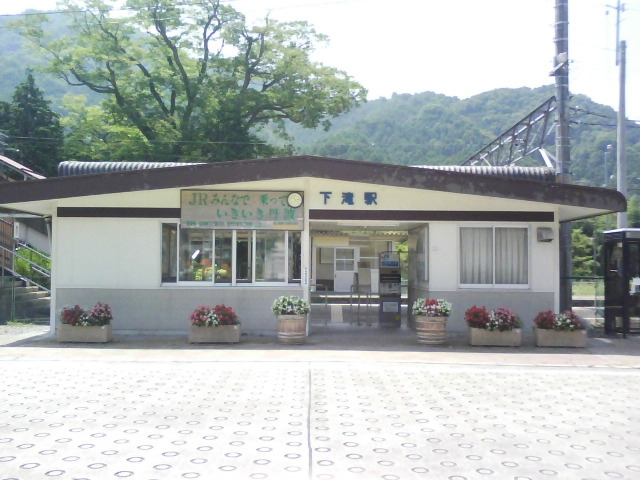
- Shimotaki Station in August 2009

General information
- Location: Sannocho Shimotaki, Tamba-shi, Hyōgo-ken 669-3102; Japan
- Coordinates: 35.0877°N 135.0944°E
- Owner: West Japan Railway Company
- Operator: West Japan Railway Company
- Line: Fukuchiyama Line
- Distance: 68.7 km (42.7 miles) from Amagasaki
- Platforms: 2 side platforms
- Connections: Bus stop

Other information
- Status: Unstaffed
- Website: Official website

History
- Opened: 25 May 1899

Passengers
- FY2016: 67 daily
Location
- Location within Hyōgo Prefecture Location within Japan

Shimotaki Station (下滝駅, Shimotaki-eki) is a passenger railway station located in the city of Tamba, Hyōgo Prefecture, Japan, operated by West Japan Railway Company (JR West).

== Lines ==
Shimotaki Station is served by the Fukuchiyama Line, and is located 68.7 kilometers from the terminus of the line at Amagasaki.

== Station layout ==
The station consists of two opposed ground-level side platforms connected to the station building by a footbridge. The station is unattended.

=== Platforms ===
1	■ Fukuchiyama Line	for Fukuchiyama
2	■ Fukuchiyama Line	for Sasayamaguchi and Sanda

== Adjacent stations ==
«	Service	»
Fukuchiyama Line
Tamba-Ōyama	Local	Tanikawa
Tamba-Ōyama	Tambaji Rapid Service	Tanikawa

== History ==
Shimotaki Station opened on May 25, 1899 . With the privatization of the Japan National Railways (JNR) on April 1, 1987, the station came under the aegis of the West Japan Railway Company.

== Passenger statistics ==
In fiscal 2016, the station was used by an average of 67 passengers daily

== Surrounding area ==
- Tamba City Kamikushita Elementary School

== See also ==
- List of railway stations in Japan
