= Kusano Station =

Kusano Station (草野駅) is the name of multiple train stations in Japan.

- Kusano Station (Fukushima) - in Fukushima Prefecture
- Kusano Station (Hyōgo) - in Hyōgo Prefecture
