= Minami-Yashiro Station =

Railway station in Tamba-Sasayama, Hyōgo Prefecture, Japan

Minami-Yashiro Station 南矢代駅
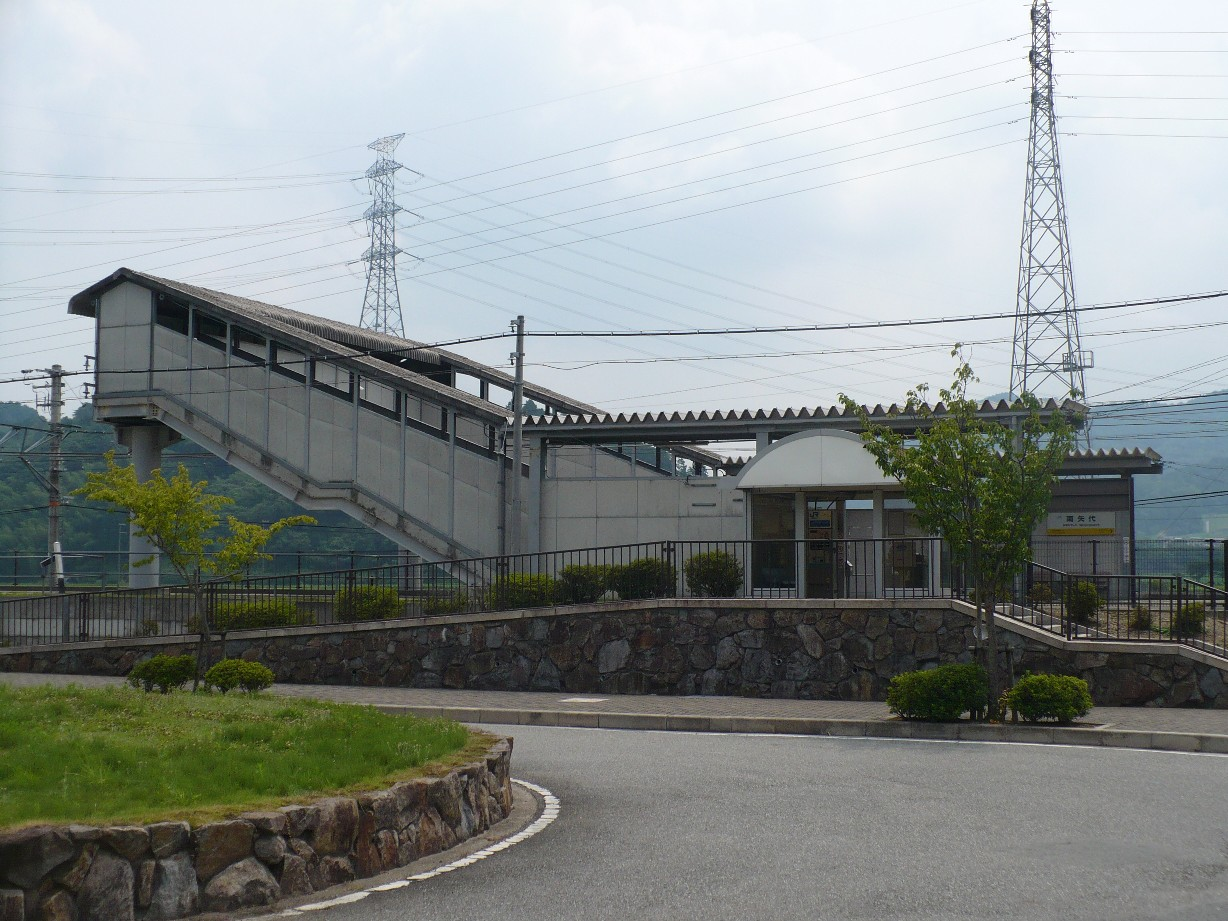
- Minami-Yashiro Station in August 2008

General information
- Location: Minamiyashiro, Tamba-Sasayama-shi, Hyōgo-ken 669-2102; Japan
- Coordinates: 35.0377°N 135.1749°E
- Owner: West Japan Railway Company
- Operator: West Japan Railway Company
- Lines: Fukuchiyama Line (JR Takarazuka Line)
- Distance: 56.1 km (34.9 miles) from Amagasaki
- Platforms: 2 side platforms
- Connections: Bus stop

Construction
- Structure type: Ground level
- Accessible: None

Other information
- Status: Unstaffed
- Station code: JR-G68
- Website: Official website

History
- Opened: 25 October 1955

Passengers
- FY2016: 148 daily
Location
- Location within Hyōgo Prefecture Location within Japan

Minami-Yashiro Station (南矢代駅, Minami-Yashiro-eki) is a passenger railway station located in the city of Tamba-Sasayama, Hyōgo Prefecture, Japan, operated by West Japan Railway Company (JR West).<

== Lines ==
Minami-Yashiro Station is served by the Fukuchiyama Line (JR Takarazuka Line), and is located 56.1 kilometers from the terminus of the line at Amagasaki and 63.8 kilometers from Osaka.

== Station layout ==
The station consists of two opposed ground-level side platforms connected to the station building by a footbridge. The station is unattended.

=== Platforms ===
1	■ Fukuchiyama Line (JR Takarazuka Line)	for Fukuchiyama
2	■ Fukuchiyama Line (JR Takarazuka Line)	for Sasayamaguchi and Sanda

== Adjacent stations ==
«	Service	»
Fukuchiyama Line (JR Takarazuka Line)
Furuichi	Local	Sasayamaguchi
Furuichi	Regional Rapid Service	Sasayamaguchi
Furuichi	Rapid Service	Sasayamaguchi
Furuichi	Tambaji Rapid Service	Sasayamaguchi

== History ==
Minami-Yashiro Station opened on 24 October 1955 . With the privatization of the Japan National Railways (JNR) on 1 April 1987, the station came under the aegis of the West Japan Railway Company.

Station numbering was introduced in March 2018 with Minami-Yashiro being assigned station number JR-G68.

== Passenger statistics ==
In fiscal 2016, the station was used by an average of 148 passengers daily

== Surrounding area ==
- Japan National Route 176
- Japan National Route 372

== See also ==
- List of railway stations in Japan
