= Furuichi Station (Hyōgo) =

Railway station in Tamba-Sasayama, Hyōgo Prefecture, Japan

Furuichi Station 古市駅
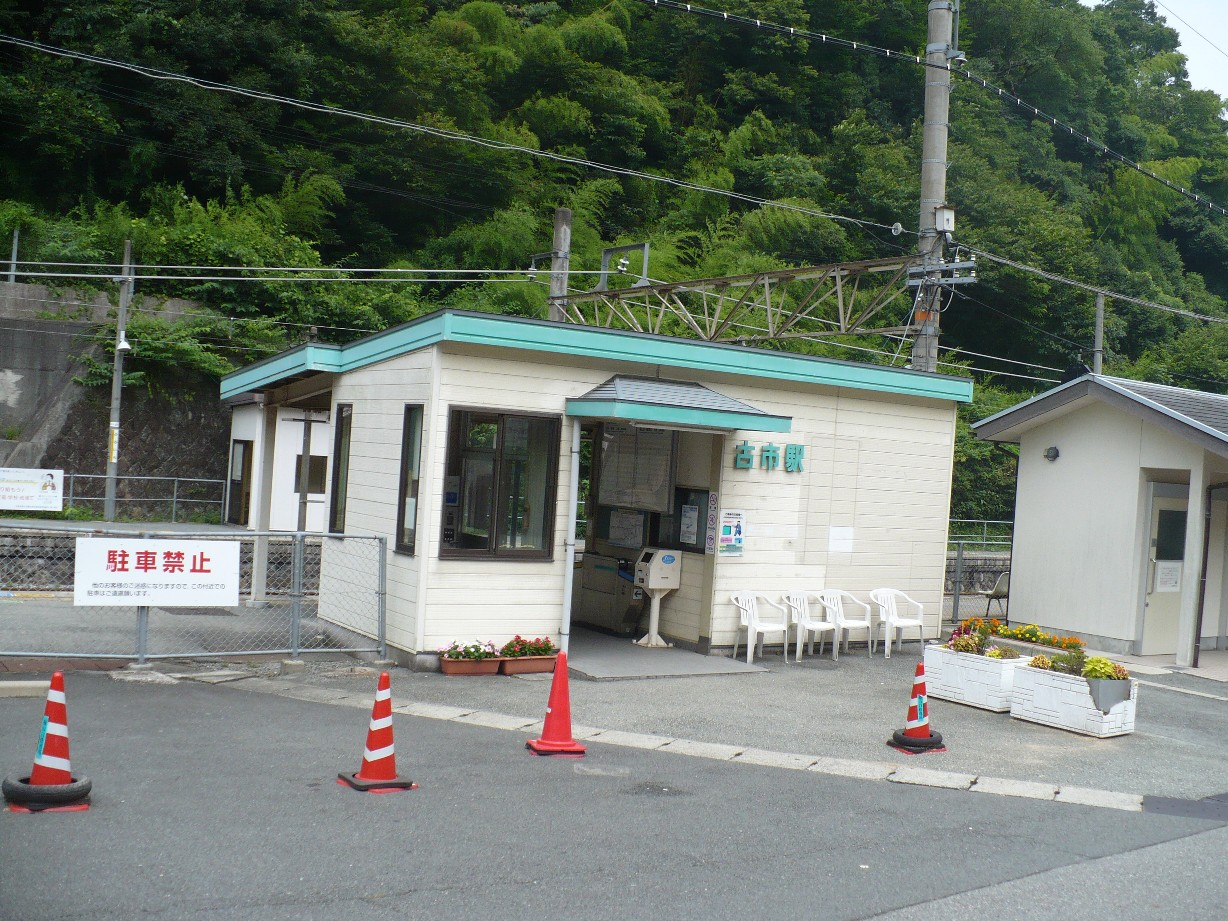
- Furuichi Station in August 2008

General information
- Location: 197-1Furuichi, Tamba-Sasayama-shi, Hyōgo-ken 669-2123; Japan
- Coordinates: 35°01′19″N 135°09′19″E
- Owner: West Japan Railway Company
- Operator: West Japan Railway Company
- Lines: Fukuchiyama Line (JR Takarazuka Line)
- Distance: 53.5 km (33.2 miles) from Amagasaki
- Platforms: 2 side platforms
- Connections: Bus stop

Construction
- Structure type: Ground level
- Accessible: None

Other information
- Status: Unstaffed
- Station code: JR-G67
- Website: Official website

History
- Opened: 25 March 1899

Passengers
- FY2016: 197 daily
Location
- Location within Hyōgo Prefecture Location within Japan

Furuichi Station (古市駅, Furuichi-eki) is a passenger railway station located in the city of Tamba-Sasayama, Hyōgo Prefecture, Japan, operated by West Japan Railway Company (JR West).

== Lines ==
Furuichi Station is served by the Fukuchiyama Line (JR Takarazuka Line), and is located 53.5 kilometers from the terminus of the line at Amagasaki and 62.1 kilometers from Osaka.

== Station layout ==
The station consists of two opposed ground-level side platforms connected to the station building by a footbridge. The station is unattended.

=== Platforms ===
1	■ Fukuchiyama Line (JR Takarazuka Line)	for Sanda and Takarazuka
2	■ Fukuchiyama Line (JR Takarazuka Line)	for Sasayamaguchi and Fukuchiyama

== Adjacent stations ==
«	Service	»
Fukuchiyama Line (JR Takarazuka Line)
Kusano	Local	Minami-Yashiro
Kusano	Regional Rapid Service	Minami-Yashiro
Kusano	Rapid Service	Minami-Yashiro
Kusano	Tambaji Rapid Service	Minami-Yashiro

== History ==
Furuichi Station opened on 25 March 1899. With the privatization of the Japan National Railways (JNR) on 1 April 1987, the station came under the aegis of the West Japan Railway Company.

Station numbering was introduced in March 2018 with Furuichi being assigned station number JR-G67.

== Passenger statistics ==
In fiscal 2016, the station was used by an average of 197 passengers daily

== Surrounding area ==
- Sasayama Municipal Furuichi Elementary School
- Mount Shirakami and Mount Matsuo.

== See also ==
- List of railway stations in Japan
