= Mount Mitake =

Mount Mitake may refer to:

- Mount Mitake (Tokyo)
- Mount Mitake (Hyōgo)
