= Kusano Station (Hyōgo) =

Railway station in Tamba-Sasayama, Hyōgo Prefecture, Japan

Kusano Station 草野駅
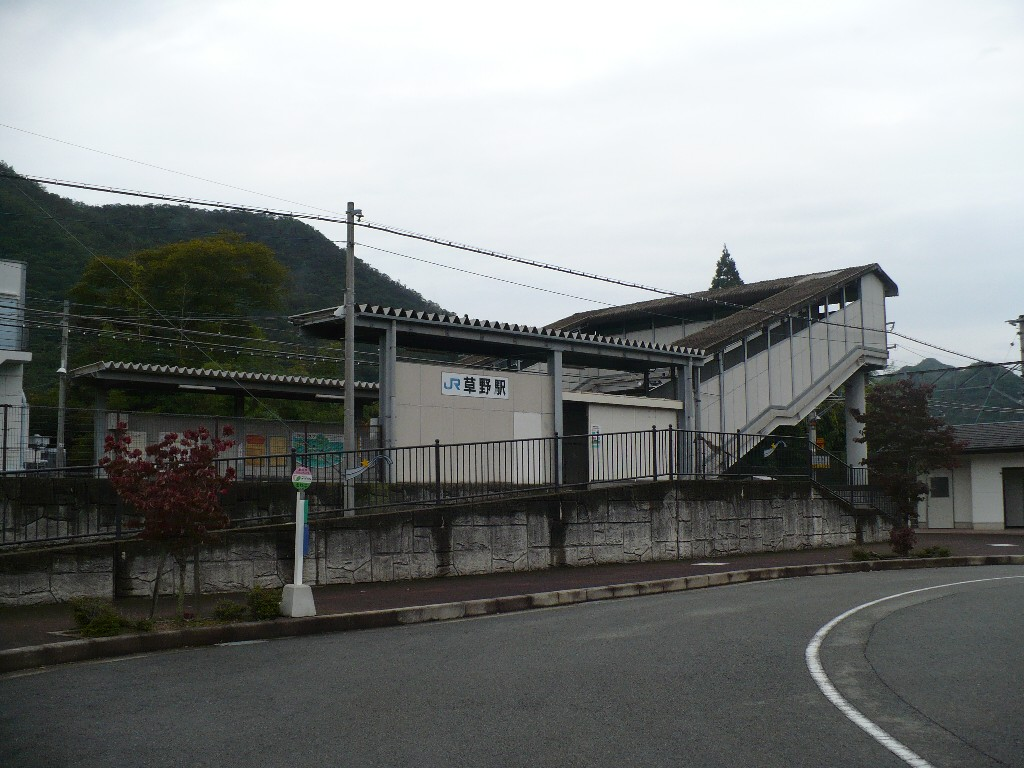
- Kusano Station in October 2008

General information
- Location: Kusano, Tamba-Sasayama-shi, Hyōgo-ken 669-2113; Japan
- Coordinates: 34°59′49″N 135°09′08″E
- Owner: West Japan Railway Company
- Operator: West Japan Railway Company
- Lines: Fukuchiyama Line (JR Takarazuka Line)
- Distance: 50.5 km (31.4 miles) from Amagasaki
- Platforms: 2 side platforms
- Connections: Bus stop

Construction
- Structure type: Ground level
- Accessible: None

Other information
- Status: Unstaffed
- Station code: JR-G66
- Website: Official website

History
- Opened: 27 March 1958

Passengers
- FY2016: 239 daily
Location
- Location within Hyōgo Prefecture Location within Japan

Kusano Station (草野駅, Kusano-eki) is a passenger railway station located in the city of Tamba-Sasayama, Hyōgo Prefecture, Japan, operated by West Japan Railway Company (JR West).

== Lines ==
Kusano Station is served by the Fukuchiyama Line (JR Takarazuka Line), and is located 50.5 kilometers from the terminus of the line at Amagasaki and 57.9 kilometers from Osaka.

== Station layout ==
The station consists of two opposed ground-level side platforms connected to the station building by a footbridge. The station is unattended.

=== Platforms ===
1	■ Fukuchiyama Line (JR Takarazuka Line)	for Sasayamaguchi and Fukuchiyama
2	■ Fukuchiyama Line (JR Takarazuka Line)	for Sanda and Takarazuka

== Adjacent stations ==
«	Service	»
Fukuchiyama Line (JR Takarazuka Line)
Aimoto	Local	Furuichi
Aimoto	Regional Rapid Service	Furuichi
Aimoto	Rapid Service	Furuichi
Aimoto	Tambaji Rapid Service	Furuichi

== History ==
Kusano Station opened on March 27 1958. With the privatization of the Japan National Railways (JNR) on 1 April 1987, the station came under the aegis of the West Japan Railway Company.

Station numbering was introduced in March 2018 with Kusano being assigned station number JR-G66.

== Passenger statistics ==
In fiscal 2016, the station was used by an average of 239 passengers daily

== Surrounding area ==
- Japan National Route 176

== See also ==
- List of railway stations in Japan
