= Mount Nishigatake =

Mountain in Hyōgo Prefecture, Japan

- 西ヶ嶽
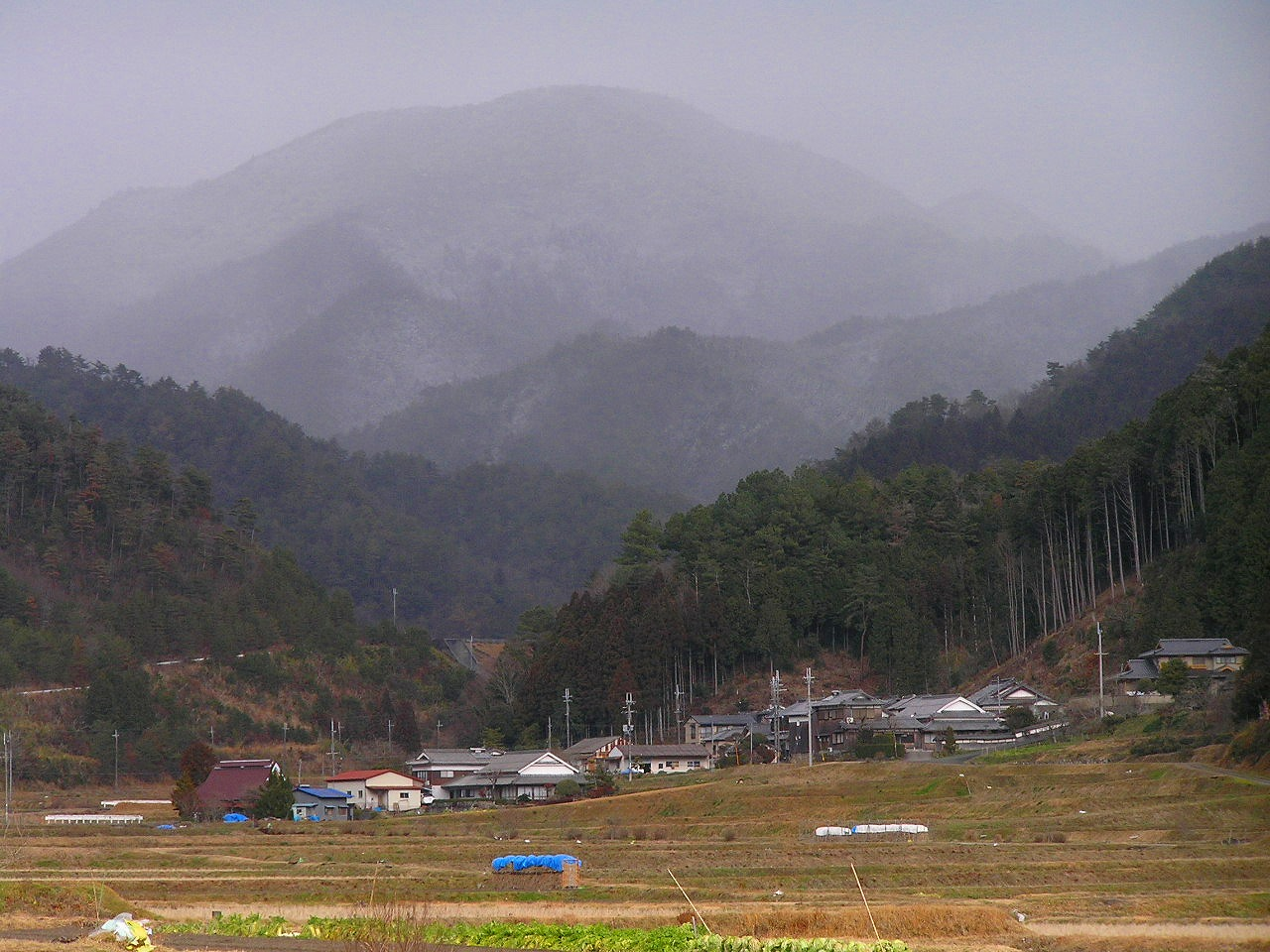
- A View of Mt. Nishigatake from Mt. Miyama

Highest point
- Elevation: 727 m (2,385 ft)
- Coordinates: 35°7.31′N 135°13.58′E

Naming
- Pronunciation: Japanese: [ɲiɕiɡaꜜtake]

Geography
- Location: Sasayama, Hyōgo, Japan
- Parent range: Taki Mountains

Mount Nishigatake (西ヶ嶽, Nishi-ga-take) is a 727-metre-high (2,385 ft) mountain in Sasayama, Hyōgo, Japan.

Mount Nishi-ga-take is the second highest mountain in the Taki Mountains after Mount Mitake.

== Access ==
- Kurikara Guchi Bus Stop of Shinki Bus
