= Mount Yajuro =

Mountain in Sasayama, Hyogō, Japan

- 弥十郎ヶ嶽
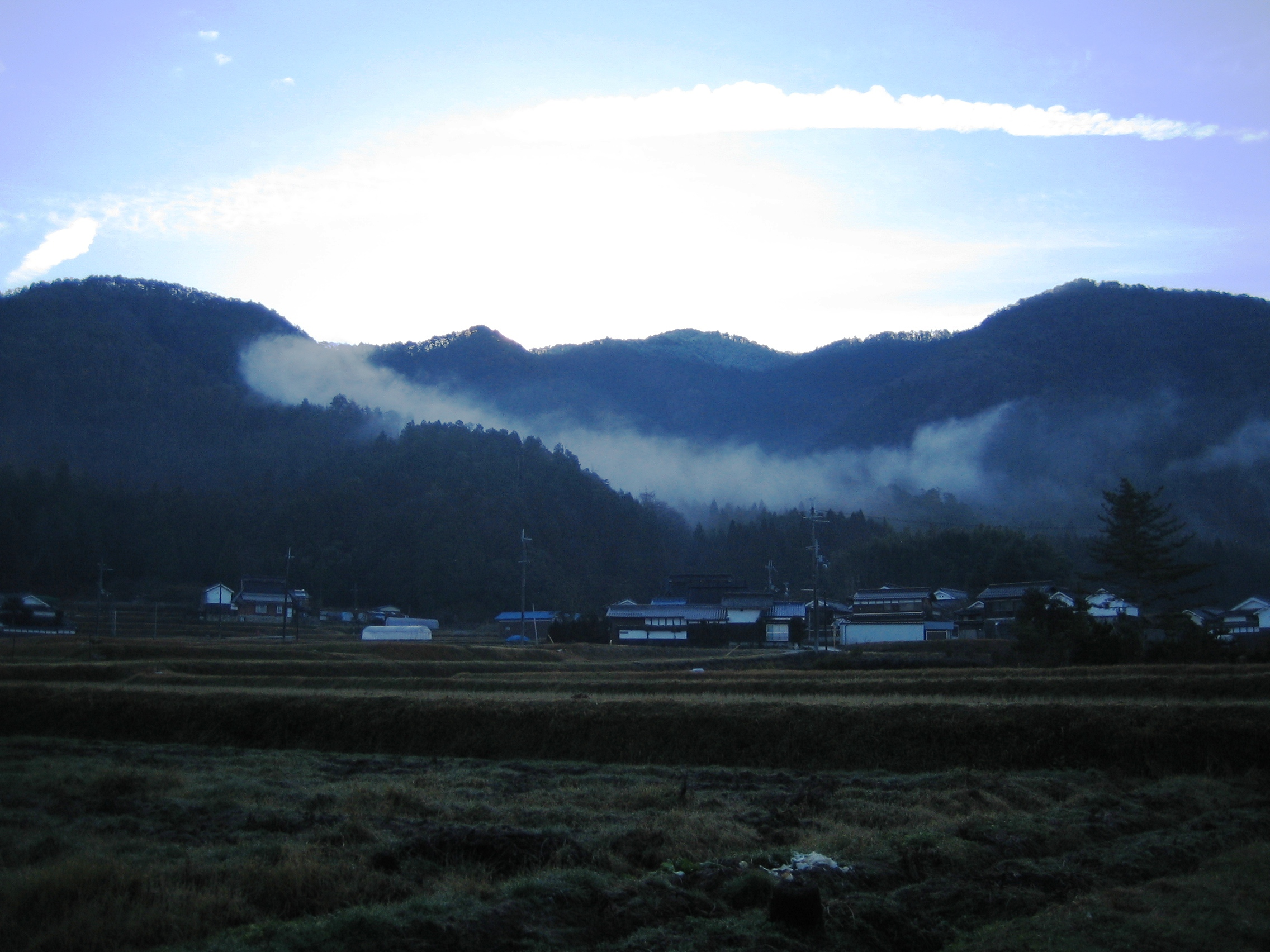
- Mount Yajuro seen from the NNW

Highest point
- Elevation: 715.1 m (2,346 ft)
- Listing: List of mountains and hills of Japan by height
- Coordinates: 35°3′N 135°18′E

Naming
- Language of name: Japanese
- Pronunciation: [jadʑɯːɾoːɡatake]

Geography
- Location: Tanbasasayama, Hyōgo, Japan
- Parent range: Tanba Highland

Geology
- Mountain type: fault-block

Mount Yajuro (弥十郎ヶ嶽, Yajūrō-ga-take) is a 715.1 m (2,346 ft) tall mountain of Tanba Highland, located in Sasayama, Hyōgo, Japan. This mountain is one of Hyōgo 50 mountains. This mountain is a part of Inagawa Natural Park.

== Outline ==
Mount Yajuro is one of the popular mountains of Tanba Highland. Mount Yajuro is a typical fault-block mountain in this area.

== Religion ==
Mount Yajuro has been an object of worship by the people around the mountain. On the south foot of the mountain, there was Saiko-ji temple which is said to be established in 731 by Gyōki. The temple moved to the north foot of the mountain, but burned in the war. On the north foot of the mountain there is Hahakabe shrine and today we can find a monument to show the shrine has their own area in the mountain.

== Route ==
There are several routes to the top of the mountain. The easiest route is from Hōkabemae Bus Stop of Shinki Bus via Yakushinogahara Camping place. It takes about two hours. Another route is from Ushiroguchi Bus Stop, it takes one and half hours. The other route is from Shimo-Kagonobo..

== Access ==
- Hōkabemae Bus Stop of Shinki Bus
- Ushiroguchi Bus Stop of Shinnki Bus
- Shimo-Kagonobo Bus Stop of Shinki Bus

== Gallery ==
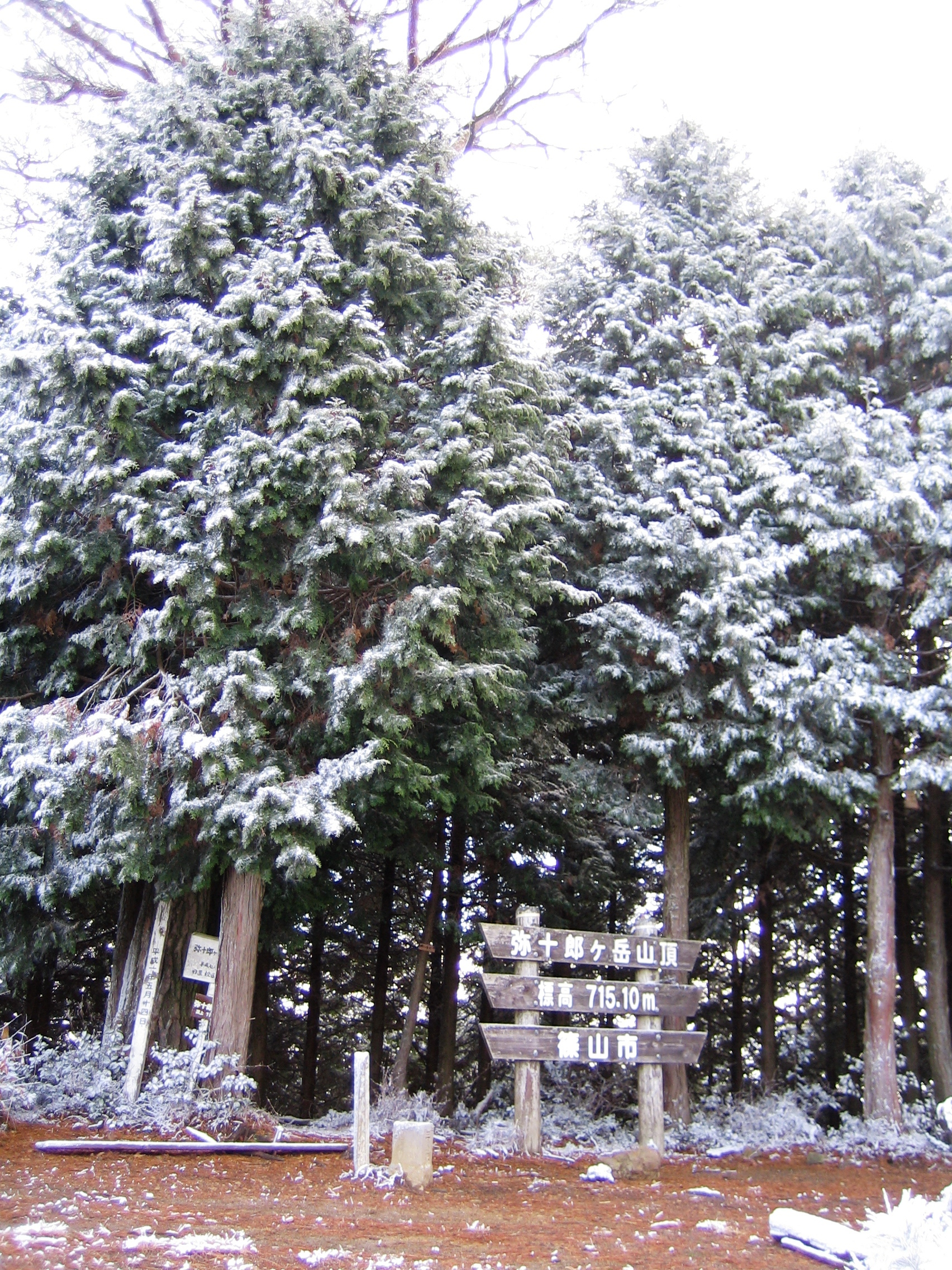
The top of Mount Yajuro with snow

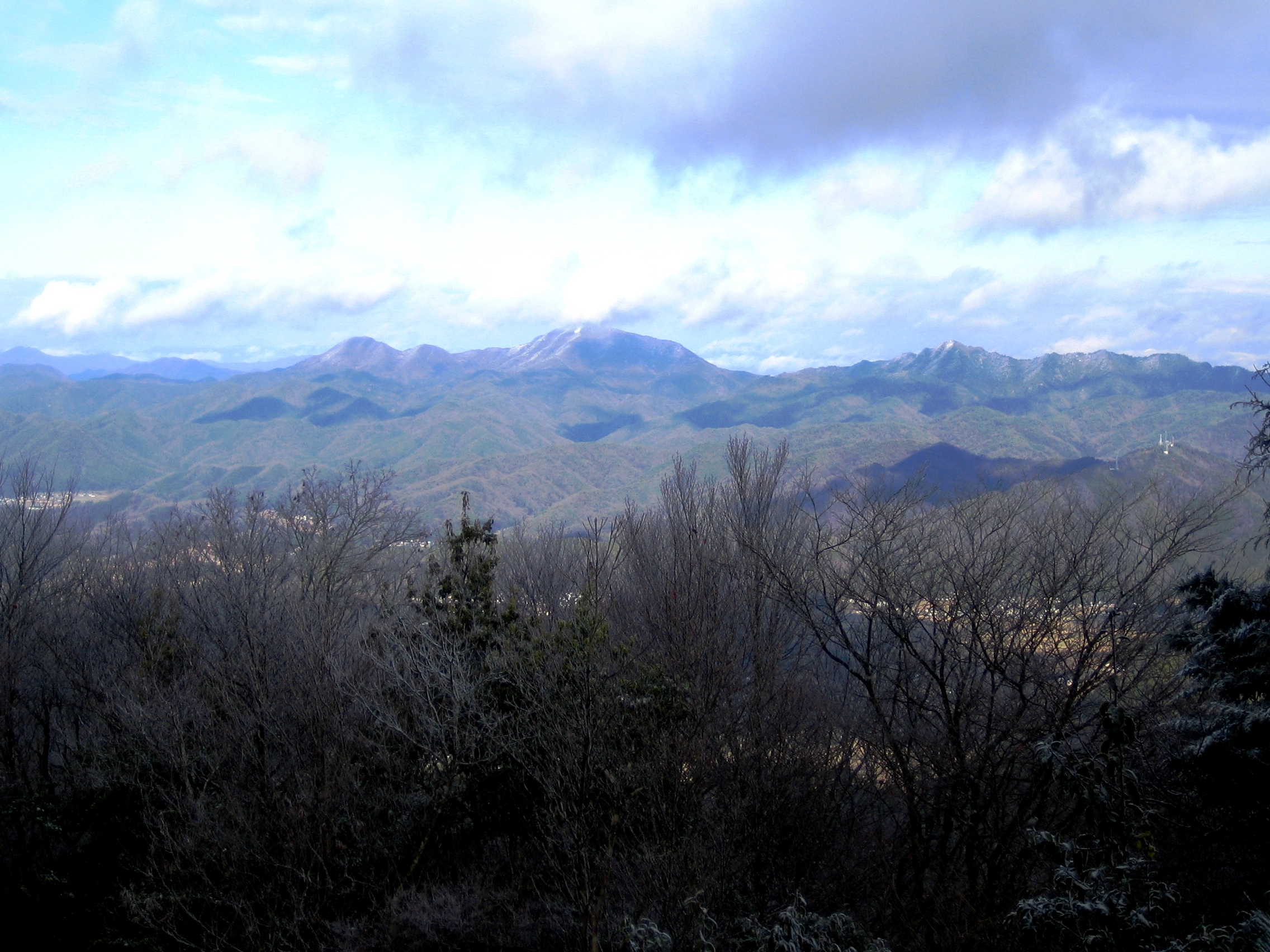
Taki Mountains from the top of Mount Yajuro

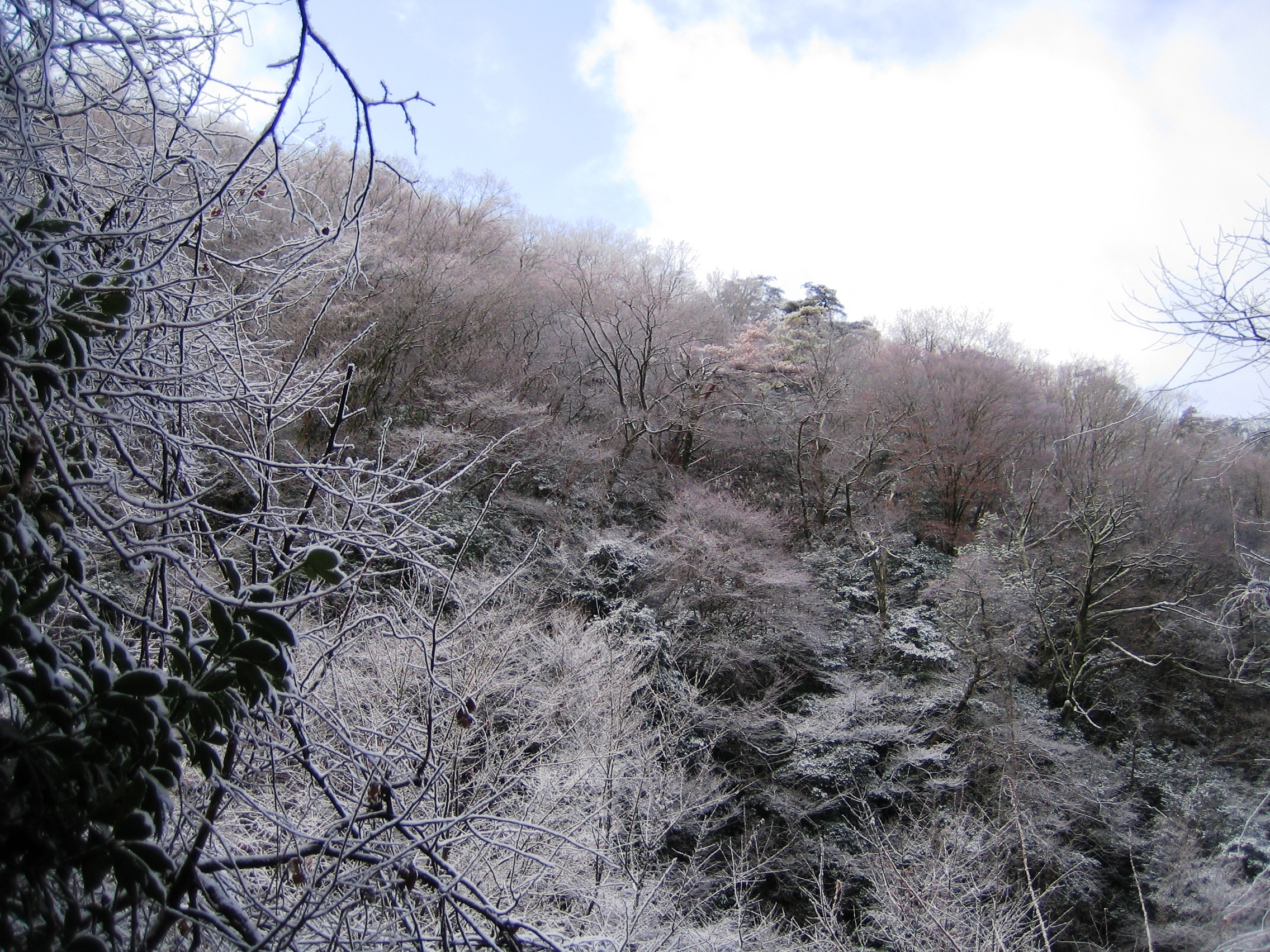
Frost on trees near the top of Mount Yajuro

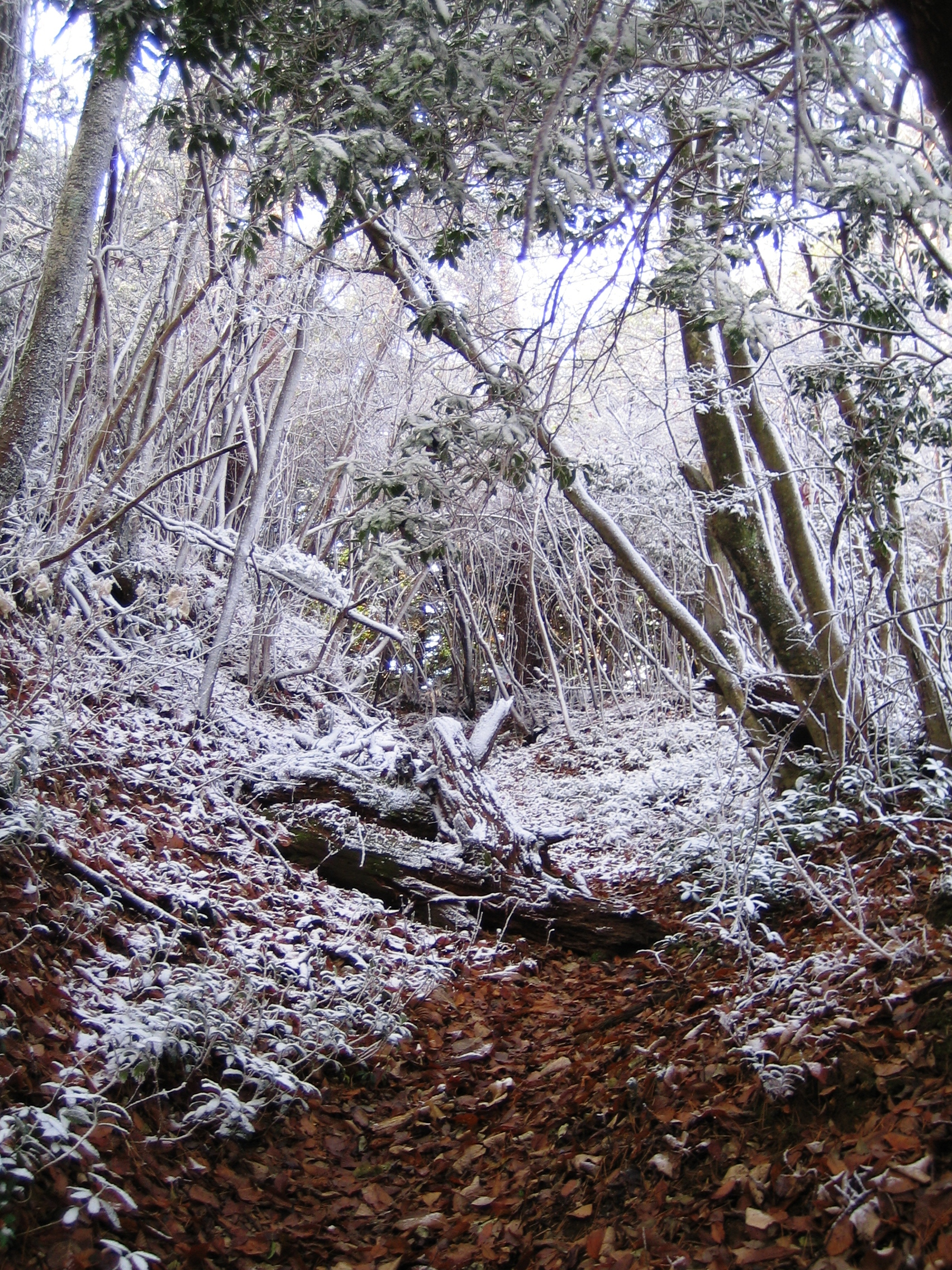
A climbing route to the top of Mount Yajuro covered snow

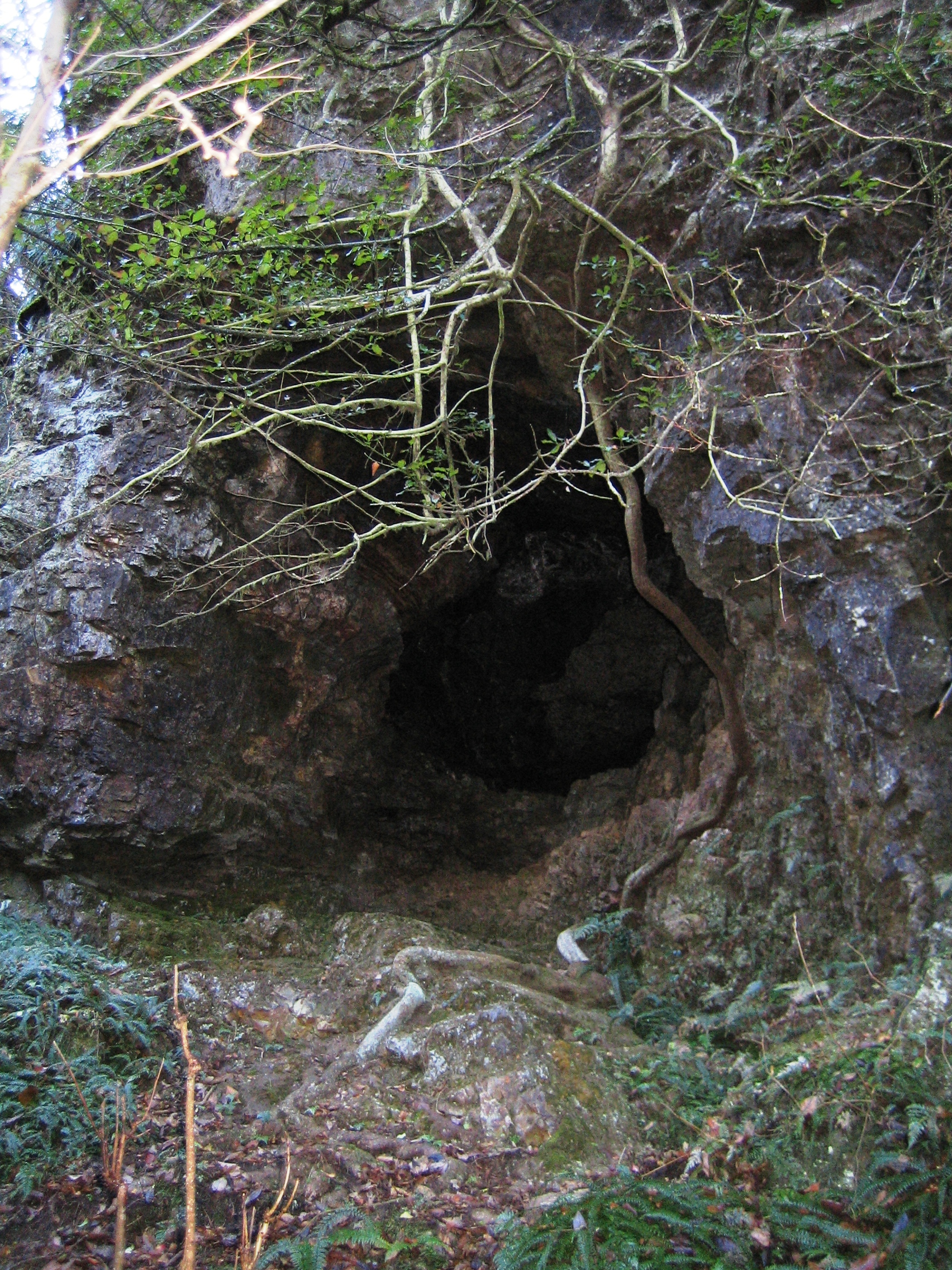
Yamakasa Yajuro Cave in the middle of Mount Yajuro

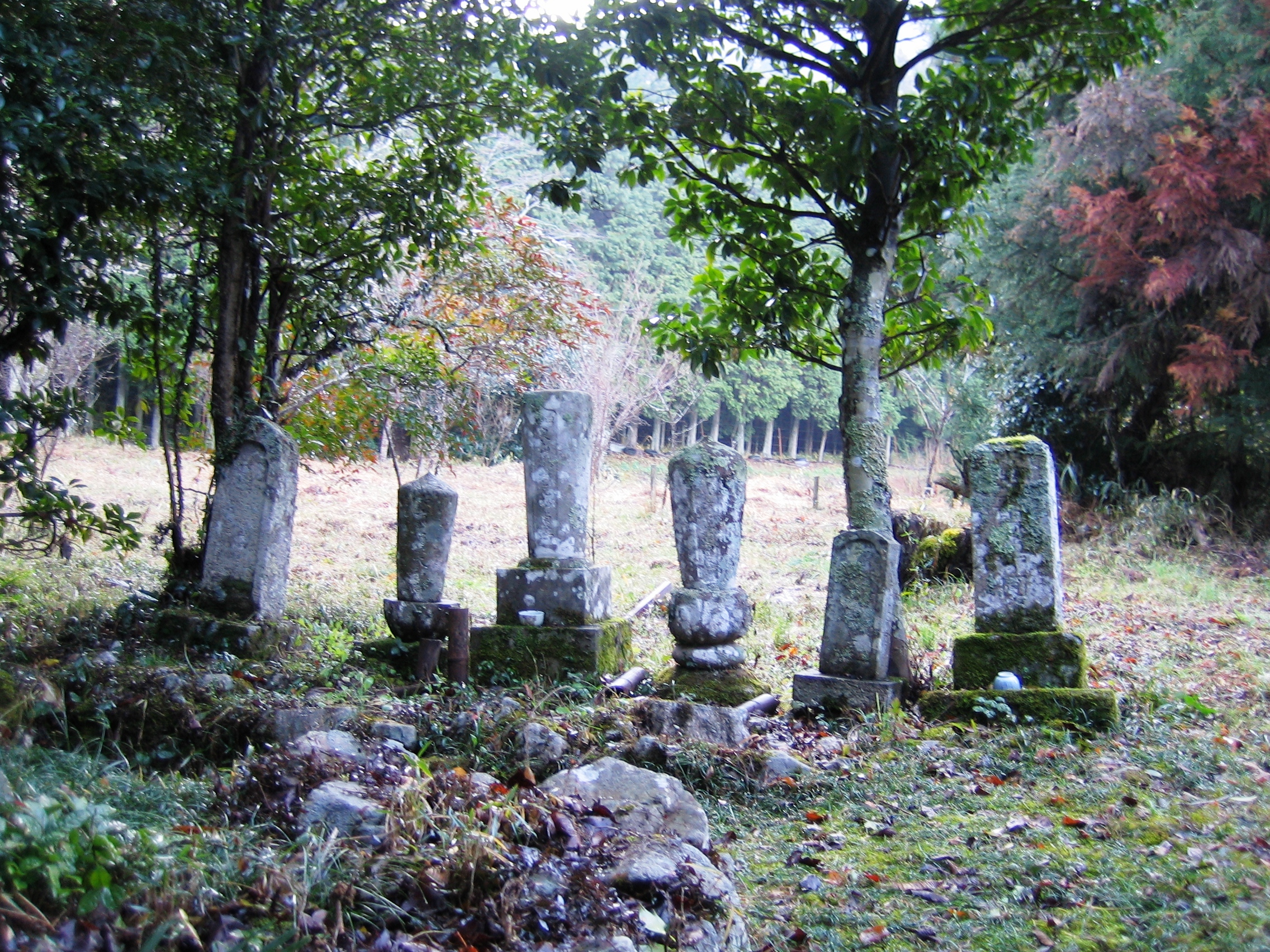
Ruins of Saiko-ji temple

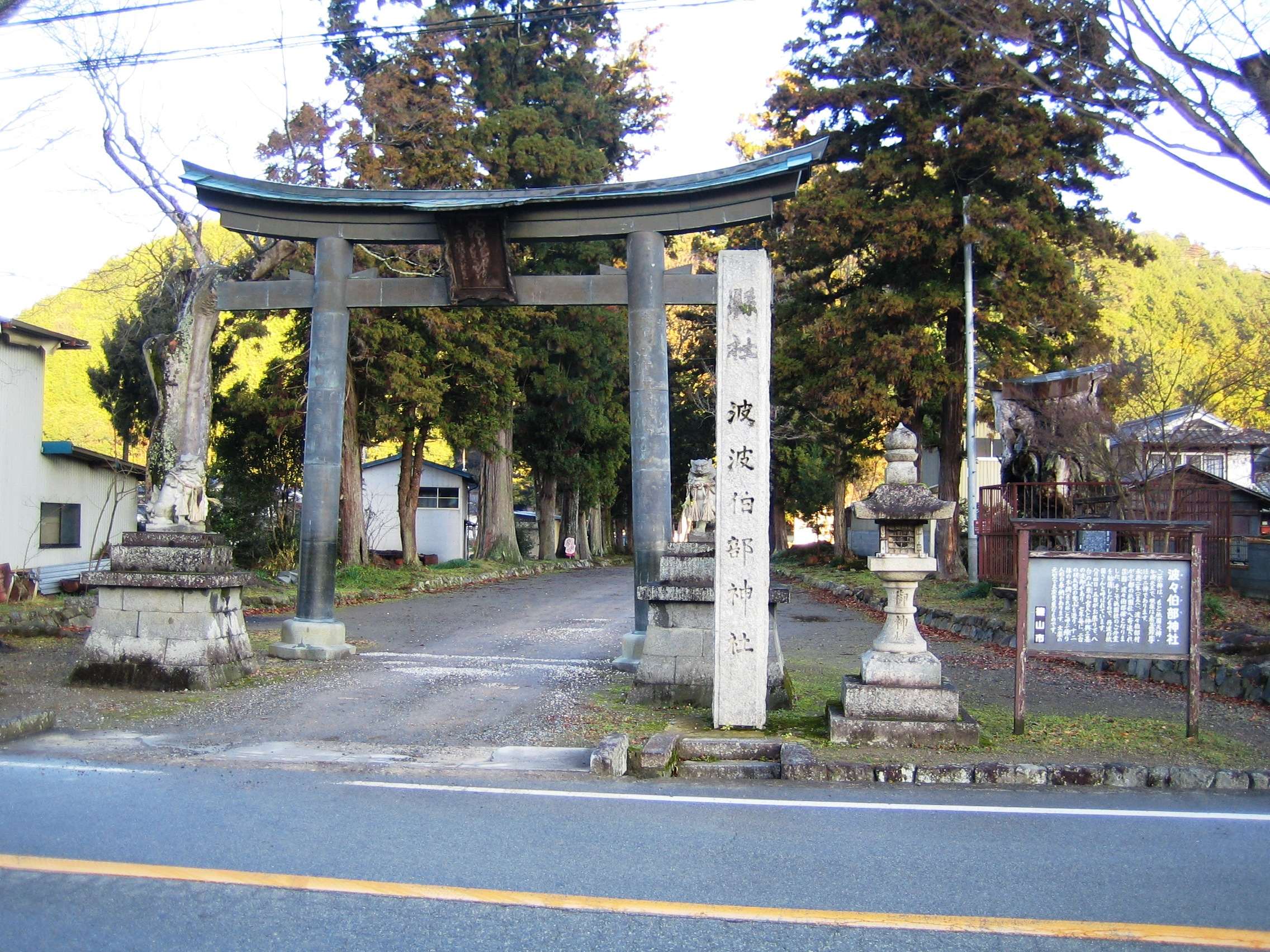
Hahakabe Shrine
