= Tamba-Ōyama Station =

Railway station in Tamba-Sasayama, Hyōgo Prefecture, Japan

Tamba-Ōyama Station 丹波大山駅
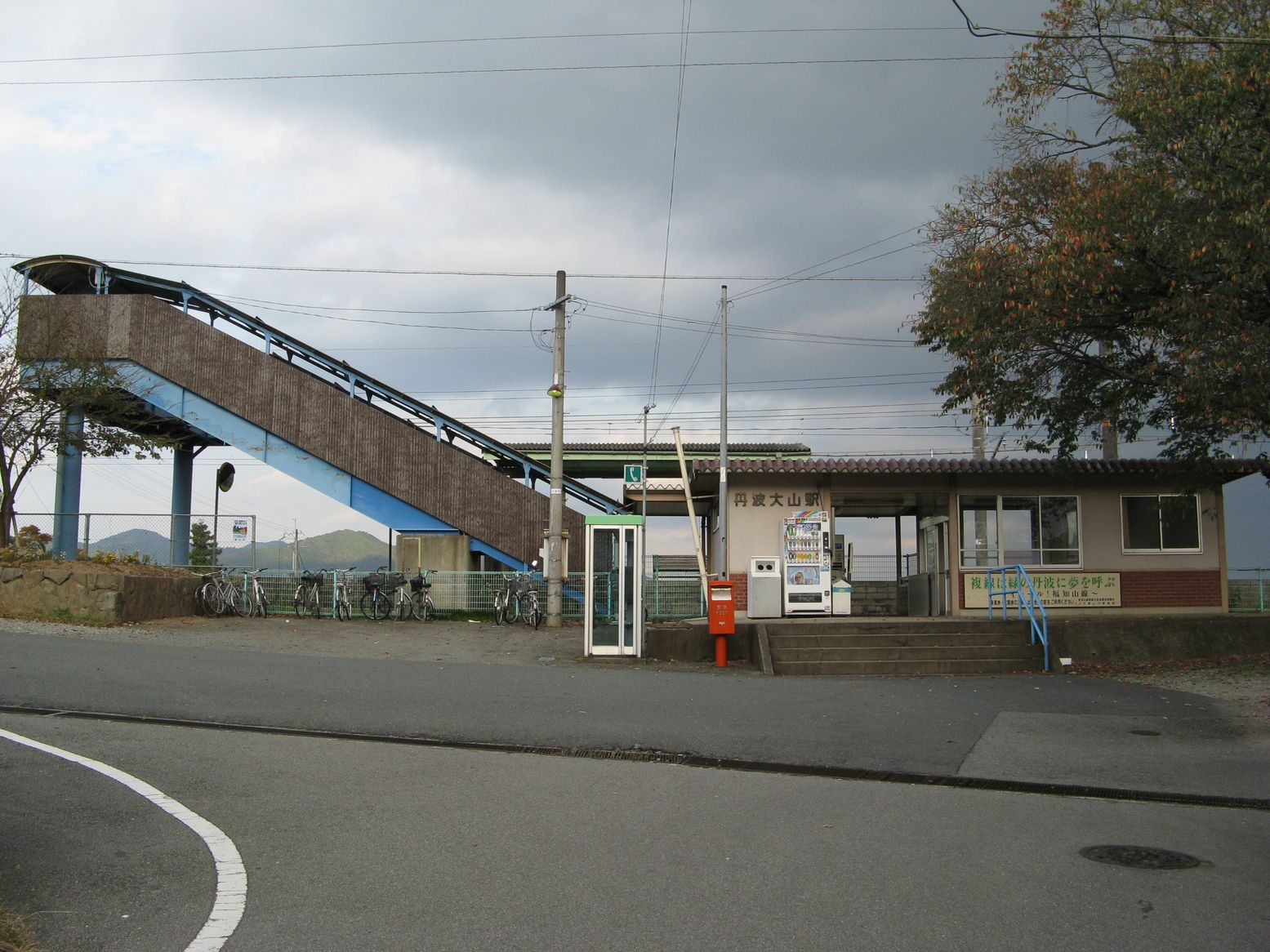
- Tamba-Ōyama Station in October 2008

General information
- Location: Nishikosa, Tamba-Sasayama-shi, Hyōgo-ken 669-2221; Japan
- Coordinates: 35.0723°N 135.1687°E
- Owner: West Japan Railway Company
- Operator: West Japan Railway Company
- Line: Fukuchiyama Line
- Distance: 60.7 km (37.7 miles) from Amagasaki
- Platforms: 1 island platform
- Connections: Bus stop

Other information
- Status: Unstaffed
- Website: Official website

History
- Opened: 25 May 1899
- Former names: Oyama Station (to 1917)

Passengers
- FY2016: 105 daily
Location
- Location within Hyōgo Prefecture Location within Japan

Tamba-Ōyama Station (丹波大山駅, Tamba-Ōyama-eki) is a passenger railway station located in the city of Tamba-Sasayama, Hyōgo Prefecture, Japan, operated by West Japan Railway Company (JR West).

== Lines ==
Tamba-Ōyama Station is served by the Fukuchiyama Line, and is located 60.7 kilometers from the terminus of the line at Amagasaki.

== Station layout ==
The station consists of one ground-level island platform connected to the station building by a footbridge. The station is unattended.

=== Platforms ===
1	■ Fukuchiyama Line	for Fukuchiyama
2	■ Fukuchiyama Line	for Sasayamaguchi and Sanda

== Adjacent stations ==
«	Service	»
Fukuchiyama Line
Sasayamaguchi	Local	Shimotaki
Sasayamaguchi	Tambaji Rapid Service	Shimotaki

== History ==
Tamba-Ōyama Station opened on May 25, 1899 as Ōyama Station (大山駅). It was renamed to its present name on May 1, 1917. With the privatization of the Japan National Railways (JNR) on April 1, 1987, the station came under the aegis of the West Japan Railway Company.

== Passenger statistics ==
In fiscal 2016, the station was used by an average of 105 passengers daily

== Surrounding area ==
- Nishikosa Public Hall
- Tamba Namikido Central Park
- Japan National Route 176

== See also ==
- List of railway stations in Japan
