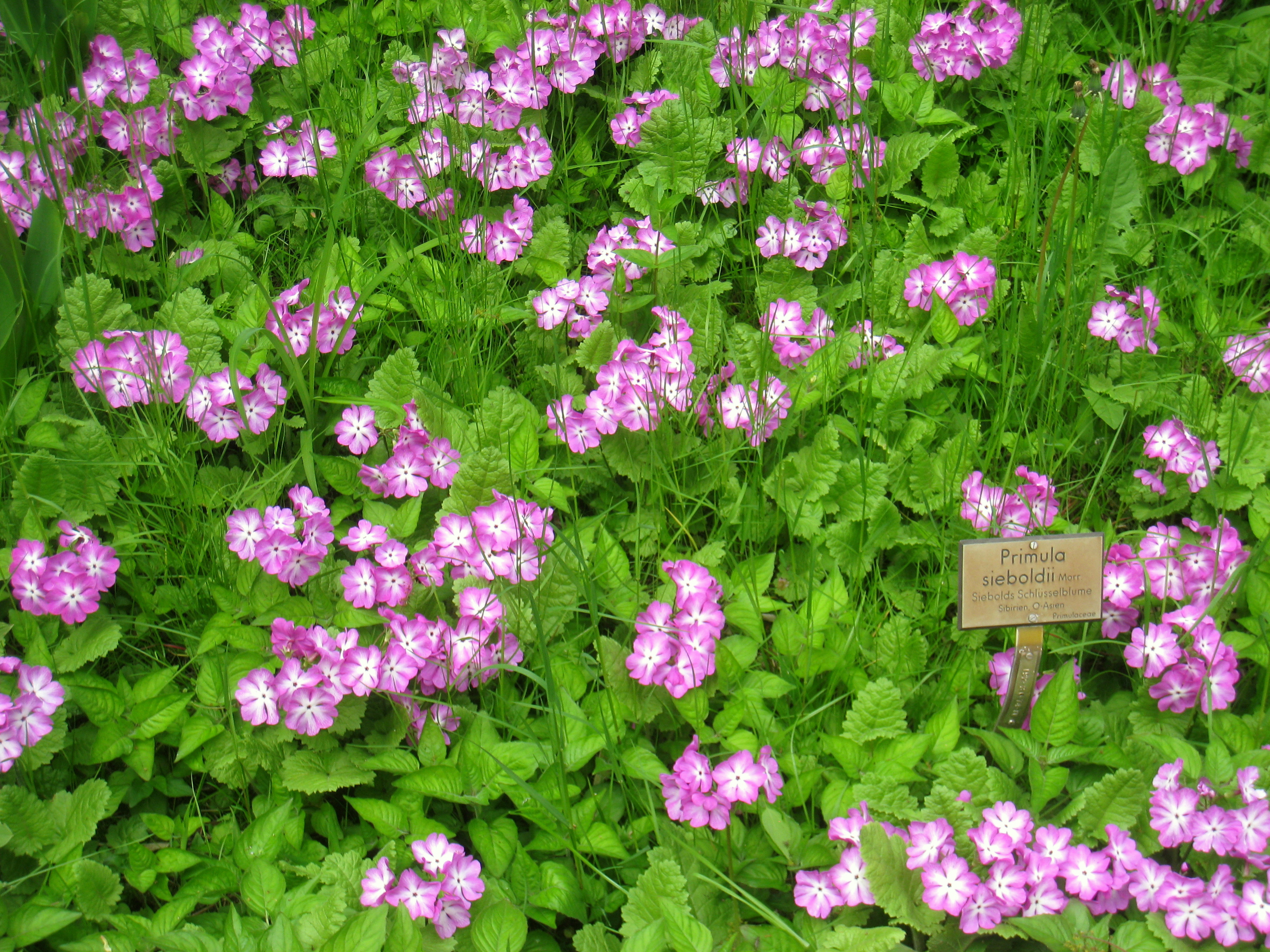

Scientific classification
- Kingdom: Plantae
- Clade: Tracheophytes
- Clade: Angiosperms
- Clade: Eudicots
- Clade: Asterids
- Order: Ericales
- Family: Primulaceae
- Genus: Primula
- Species: P. sieboldii

Binomial name
- Primula sieboldii E. Morren

Synonyms
- Primula patens Turcz.

= Primula sieboldii =

Species of flowering plant

Primula sieboldii, the Japanese primrose, is a species of primrose that is endemic to East Asia. The species goes by common names such as Siebold's primrose, cherry blossom primrose, Japanese woodland primrose Snowflake, Geisha girl, Madam butterfly and the Japanese primrose which also applies to the related species Primula japonica.

It is a recipient of the Royal Horticultural Society's Award of Garden Merit.

== Origin ==
The species was first described by Charles Jacques Édouard Morren and was named after Philipp Franz von Siebold, a German physician.

== Description ==
The plant is perennial with fibrous roots. Its leaves are arranged into a rosette while its petiole is hairy and is 3.5–12 centimetres (1.4–4.7 in) long. It has an ovate blade that is also hairy, cordate at the base, and both crenate and rounded at the apex. The species has 10–25 centimetres (3.9–9.8 in) tall scapes with an inflorescence which has an umbel of 5-15 flowers. The sepals form a bell-shaped calyx 0.7 centimetres (0.28 in) long, with spreading, lanceolate lobes. Depending on region and habitat, it flowers from April to June. Primula sieboldii is a heterostylous clonal herb and is pollinated by a variety of insects. Pollinators include butterflies, syrphids, and bumblebees such as Bombus diversus.

== Distribution ==
Primula sieboldii is an ornamental plant which grows in wet areas and forests in China, Japan, Korea, and Russia.

=== Status in Japan ===
The species was once common in moist habitats among the volcanic soils of Japan but has declined in recent years and was put on the Japanese national red list in 2000. In 2007 it was reclassified as near threatened thanks to success in conservation effects. However 19 prefectures in Japan consider Primula sieboldii as a threatened species; it has been extirpated in four prefectures as of 2017. Most populations of the species in Japan are now isolated as a consequence of habitat fragmentation, with different populations facing different conditions, genetic diversity, and risk of localized extinction.
