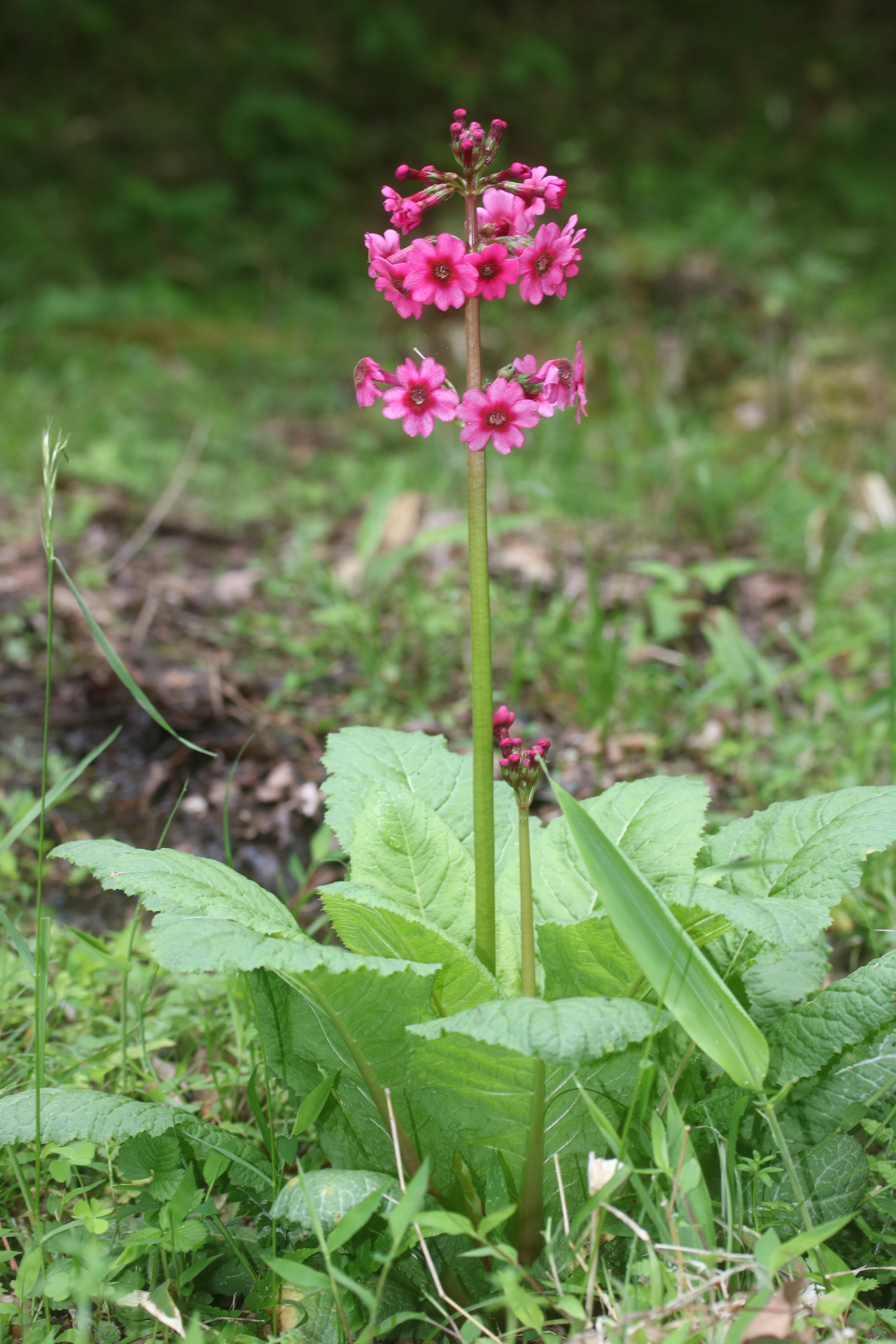

Scientific classification
- Kingdom: Plantae
- Clade: Embryophytes
- Clade: Tracheophytes
- Clade: Angiosperms
- Clade: Eudicots
- Clade: Asterids
- Order: Ericales
- Family: Primulaceae
- Genus: Primula
- Species: P. japonica

Binomial name
- Primula japonica A.Gray

Synonyms
- Aleuritia japonica (A.Gray) Soják

= Primula japonica =

Species of flowering plant

Primula japonica, the Japanese primrose, Japanese cowslip, Queen of primroses, or valley red, is a species of flowering plant in the family Primulaceae, native to Japan. The common name Japanese primrose also applies to the related species Primula sieboldii.

The plant prefers shady, damp, poorly drained conditions such as those found at the edge of streams and ponds. Numerous cultivars have been developed for garden use, of which 'Miller's Crimson' and 'Postford white' have won the Royal Horticultural Society's Award of Garden Merit.

== Description ==
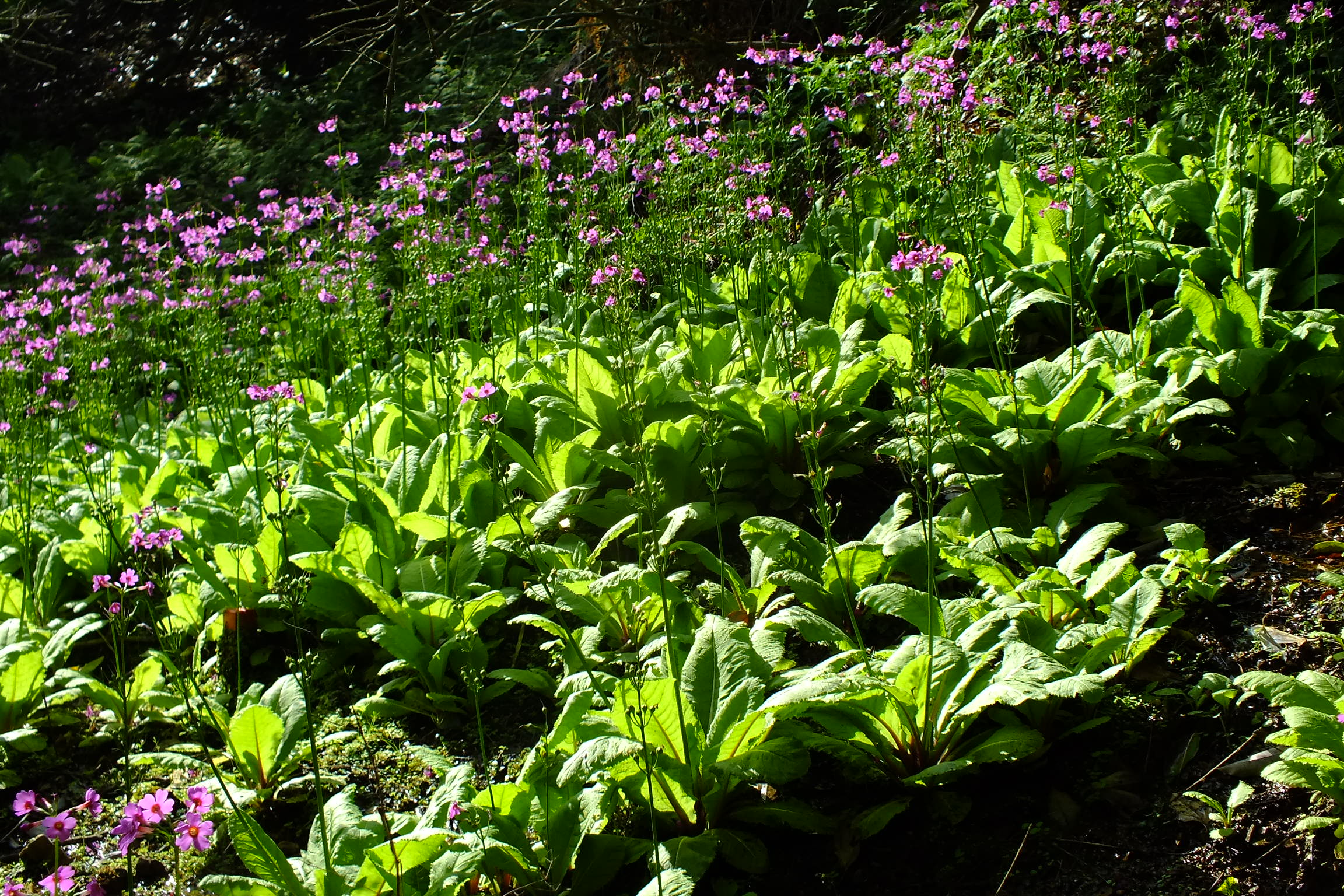
Mount Mitake (Hyōgo)

The species is a herbaceous perennial, growing to 45 centimetres (18 in) tall and broad, with clusters of purple flowers on erect stems, emerging from rosettes of leaves to 25 centimetres (9.8 in) long, in spring. The plant produces scapes which are 2 feet (0.61 m) high. The first photograph of this plant was printed in 1871 in the Gardeners' Chronicle.
