= Mount Matsuo =

Mountain in Hyogo prefecture, Japan

- 松尾山
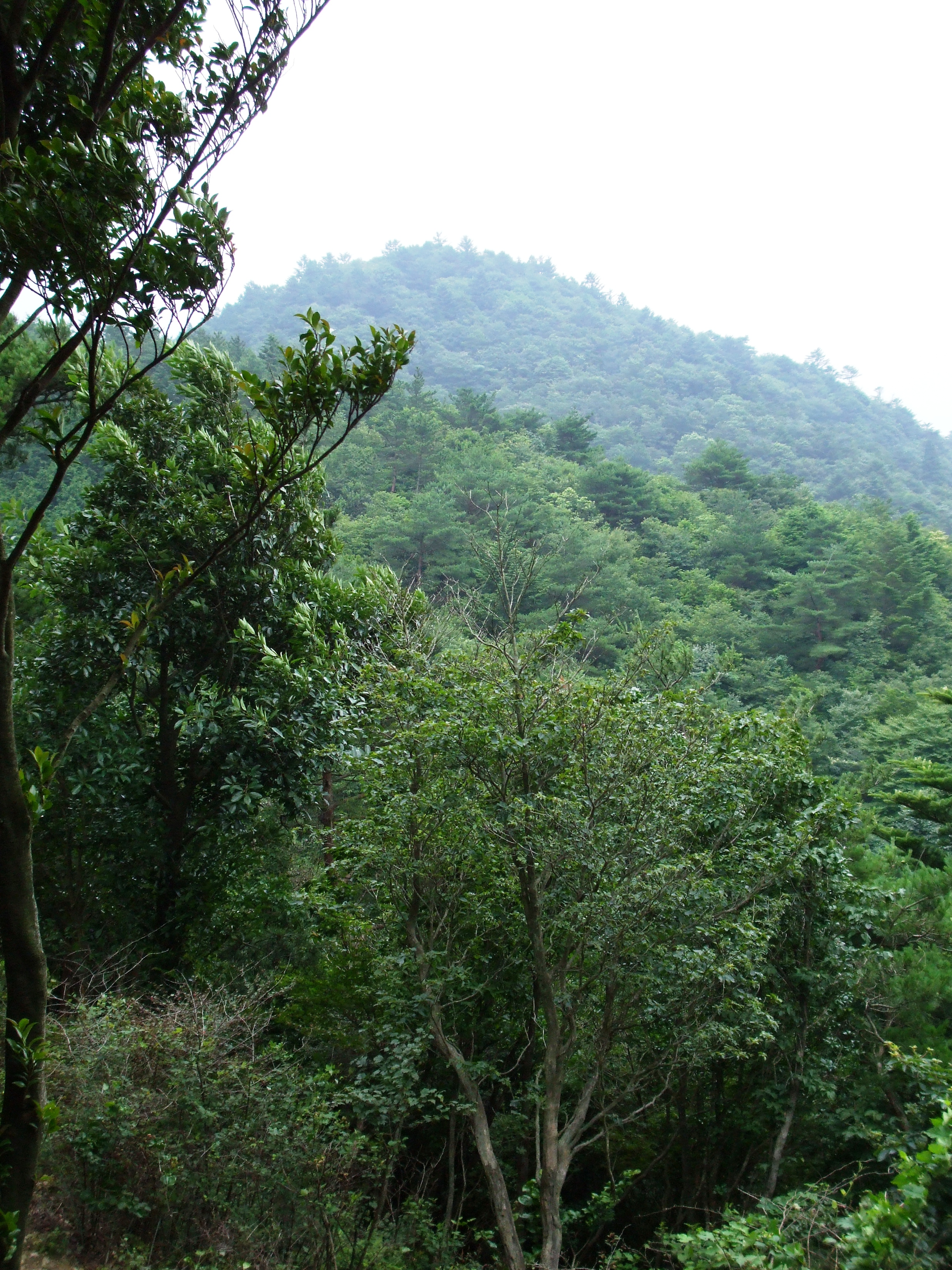
- A View of Mt. Matsuo from Mount Shirakami

Highest point
- Elevation: 687 m (2,254 ft)
- Coordinates: 35°2′N 135°8′E

Naming
- Language of name: Japanese
- Pronunciation: [matsɯ.o]

Geography
- Location: Sasayama, Hyōgo, Japan
- Parent range: Tamba Highland

Mount Matsuo (松尾山, Matsuo-yama) is a 687-metre-high (2,254 ft) mountain in Sasayama, Hyōgo Prefecture, Japan. Another name is Mount Kosen-ji, literally, "Mountain of Kosen-ji."

== Religion and History ==
Mount Matsuo is one of the major objects of worships for the people in this area. On this mountain, a Buddhist temple named ‘Kosen-ji’ was established in 645 by Hodo Sennin. This temple was re-established by Denkyo Taishi in the 9th century. The temple was burned by Akechi Mitsuhide in the 16th century, but re-established again by Toyotomi Hideyoshi. In the Edo period, it is said that there were 28 monk houses in the mountain. Kosen-ji was also destroyed as a result of the Shinbutsu bunri, literally, Shinto-Buddhism-separation.

Sakai Castle once stood on the top of this mountain; however, it was destroyed after the decline of the Sakai clan.

== Access ==
- Furuichi Station of Fukuchiyama Line
- Sasayamaguchi Station of Fukuchiyama Line

== Gallery ==
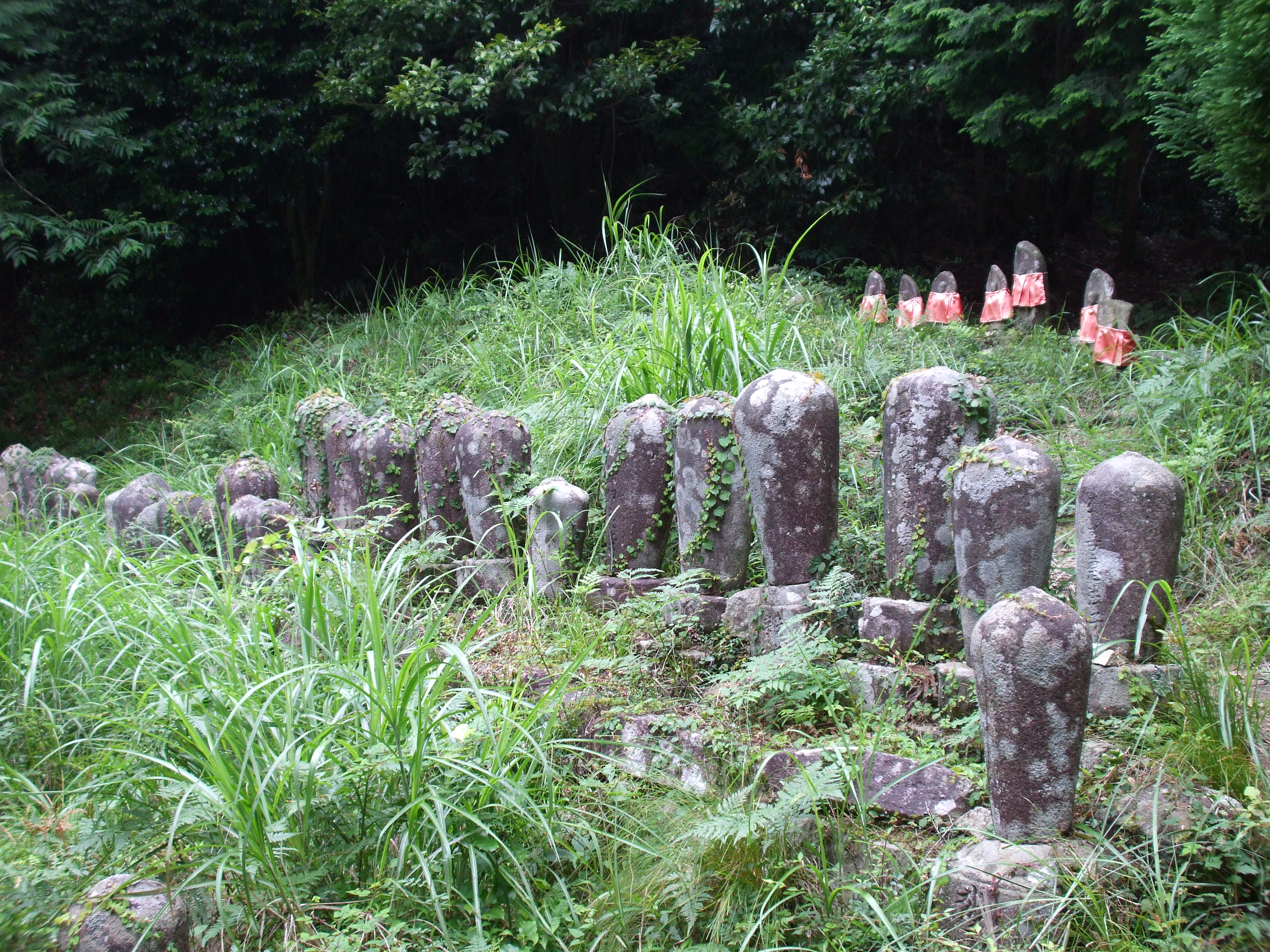
Jizō statues among the ruins of Kosen-ji

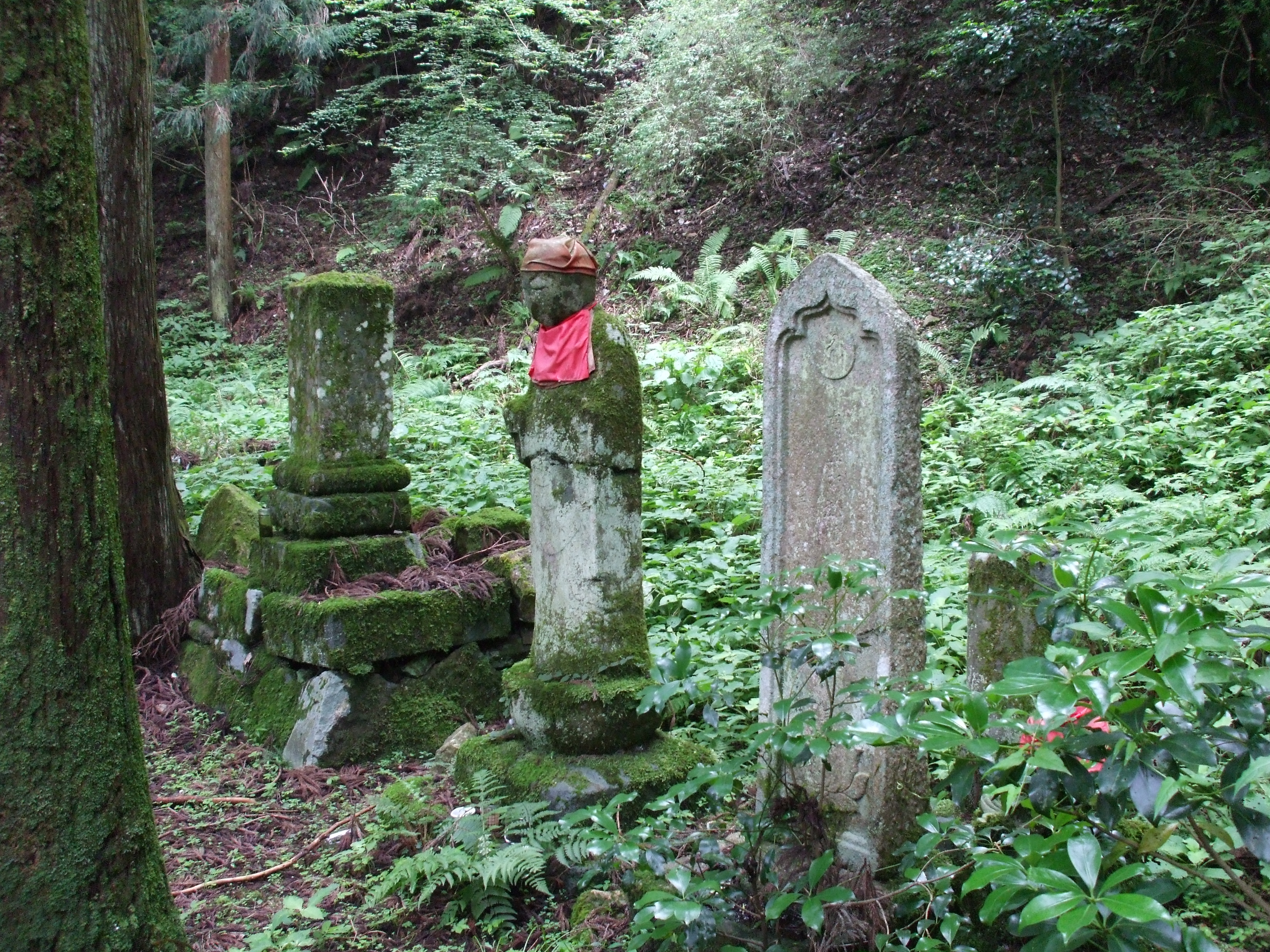
Other Jizō statues among the ruins of Kosen-ji

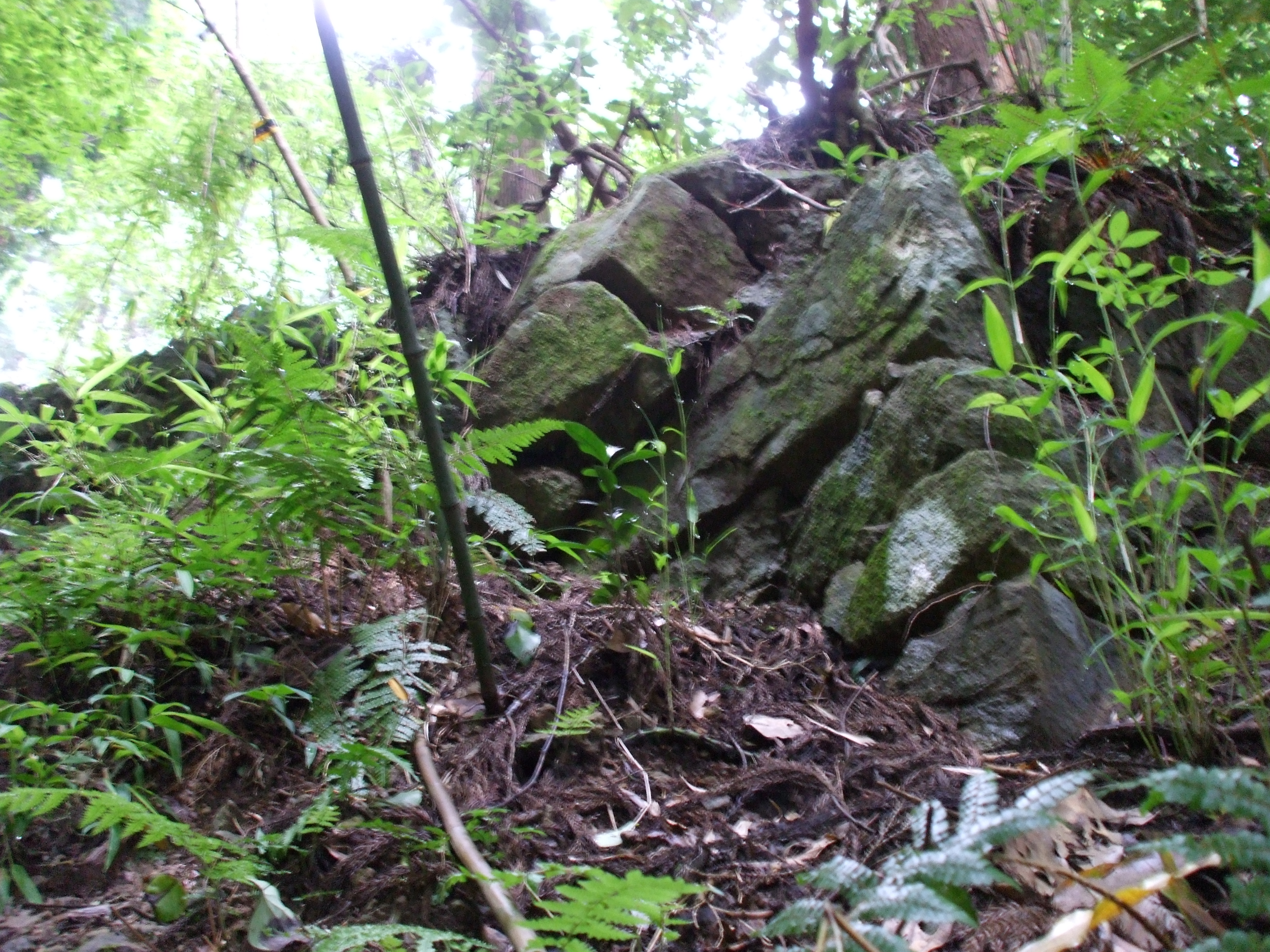
Ruins of Kosen-ji
