= Tamba-Sasayama =

Tamba-Sasayama 丹波篠山市
- City
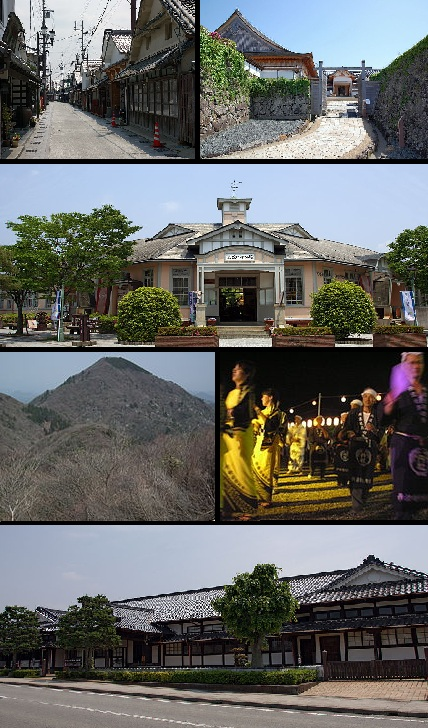
- Top left: Kawaramachi-Tsumairi traditional houses preservation area, right: Sasayama Castle Site Second row: Taisho Roman Hall, former Sasayama Town Hall; Third row left: Mount Mitake in Taki mountain range, right: Dekansho Bon Odori in August Bottom: Sasayama Historical Museum

- Flag Emblem

- Location of Tamba-Sasayama in Hyōgo Prefecture

- Location in Japan
- Coordinates: 35°04′21″N 135°13′19″E
- Country: Japan
- Region: Kansai
- Prefecture: Hyōgo

Government
  - Mayor: Takaaki Sakai (since February 2007)

Area
  - Total: 377.59 km^{2} (145.79 sq mi)

Population (March 31, 2022)
  - Total: 40,050
  - Density: 106.1/km^{2} (274.7/sq mi)
- Time zone: UTC+09:00 (JST)
- City hall address: 41 Kita-shinmachi, Tamba-Sasayama-shi, Hyogo-ken 669-2397
- Website: Official website
- Symbols
- Flower: Lilium
- Tree: Cherry blossom

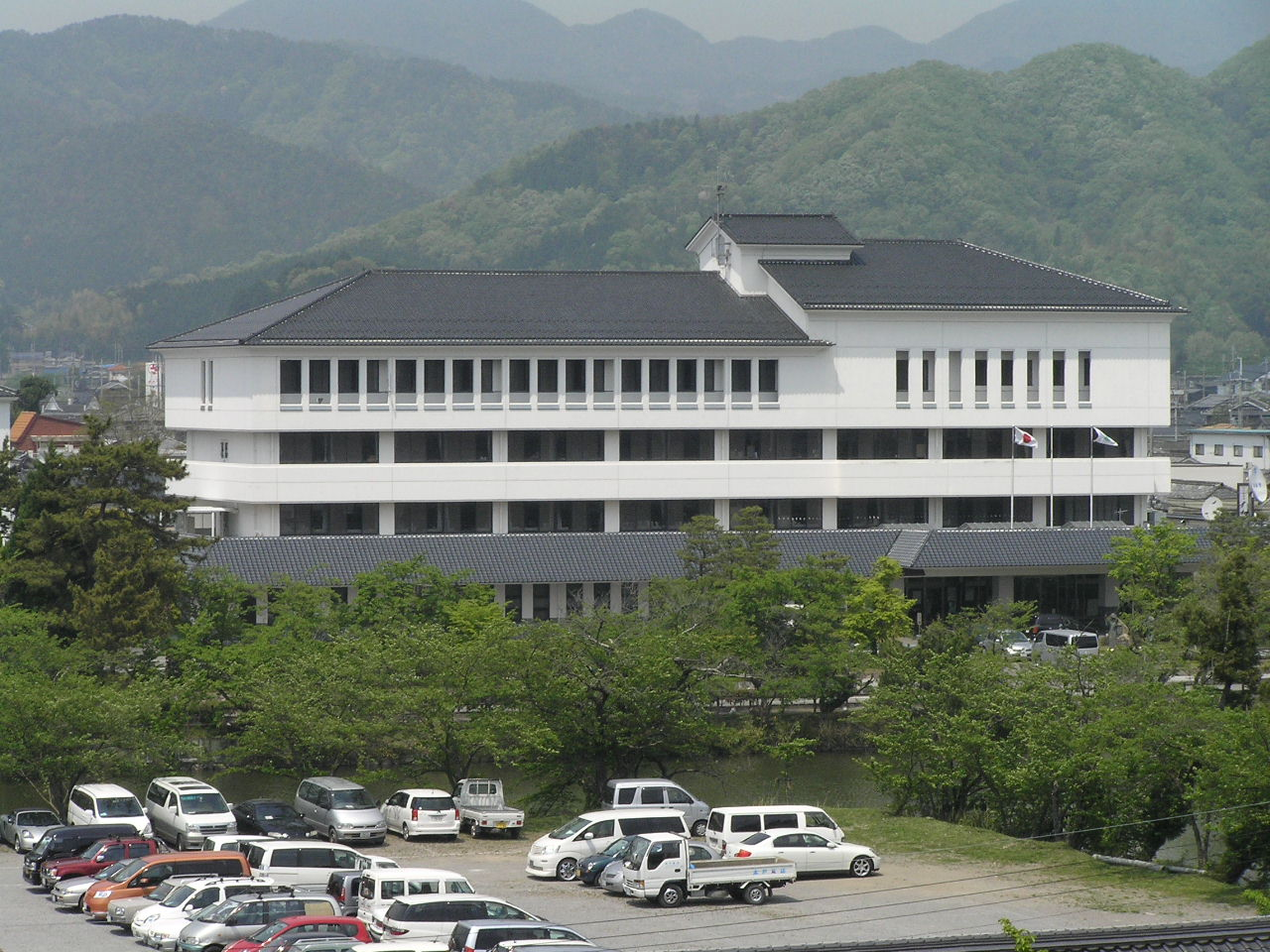
Tamba-Sayama City Hall

Tamba-Sasayama (丹波篠山市, Tanba-Sasayama-shi), formerly known as Sasayama (篠山市, Sasayama-shi), is a city in the central eastern part of Hyōgo Prefecture, Japan. As of 31 March 2022, the city had an estimated population of 40,050 in 17,523 households and a population density of 110 persons per km^{2}. The total area of the city is 377.59 square kilometres (145.79 sq mi).

== Geography ==
Tamba-Sasayama is located in an inland basin surrounded by mountains on all sides in the eastern part of the prefecture. It is located in the mountains between the Seto Inland Sea and the Sea of Japan. The city has a slightly rectangular area 30 kilometres (19 mi) east–west and 20 kilometres (12 mi) north–south.

=== Neighboring municipalities ===
Hyōgo Prefecture

- Inagawa
- Katō
- Nishiwaki
- Sanda
- Tamba

Kyoto Prefecture

- Fukuchiyama
- Kyōtamba
- Nantan

Osaka Prefecture

- Nose

=== Climate ===
Tamba-Sasayama has a Humid subtropical climate (Köppen Cfa) characterized by warm summers and cool winters with light to no snowfall. The average annual temperature in Tamba-Sasayama is 13.3 °C. The average annual rainfall is 1582 mm with September as the wettest month. The temperatures are highest on average in August, at around 25.2 °C, and lowest in January, at around 1.8 °C.

== Demographics ==
Per Japanese census data, the population of Tamba-Sasayama peaked around 1950 and has been relatively stable for the past 50 years.

Historical population
Year	Pop.	±%
1920	49,523	—
1930	49,969	+0.9%
1940	46,814	−6.3%
1950	57,083	+21.9%
1960	51,611	−9.6%
1970	43,428	−15.9%
1980	41,675	−4.0%
1990	41,802	+0.3%
2000	46,325	+10.8%
2010	43,268	−6.6%

== History ==
The area of Tamba-Sasayama was part of ancient Tanba Province, and corresponds almost exactly with ancient Taki District. Sasayama developed as a castle town around Sasayama Castle, which was constructed in the early Edo Period. The town of Sasayama was established on April 1, 1889, with the creation of the modern municipalities system, and expanded its borders through municipal mergers with neighboring villages in 1955 and 1975. It was raised to city status on April 1, 1999, from the merger of the former town of Sasayama, absorbing the towns of Konda, Nishiki and Tannan (all from Taki District).

On November 18, 2018, the city held a successful referendum on changing its name from Sasayama to Tamba-Sasayama in reference to the historical Tanba Province, which still has some influence on local branding and politics. The referendum about changing a municipality's name was the first of its kind in Japan, and the new name officially came into effect in May 2019.

== Government ==
Tamba-Sasayama has a mayor-council form of government with a directly elected mayor and a unicameral city council of 18 members. Tamba-Sasayama contributes one member to the Hyogo Prefectural Assembly. In terms of national politics, the city is part of Hyōgo fifth district of the lower house of the Diet of Japan.

== Economy ==
Tamba-Sasayama has mostly a rural economy based on agriculture and forestry. Tamba-Sasayama is well known in the Kansai region for its agriculture and food products, specifically kuromame or kuro daizu (black soybeans), mountain yam, Japanese chestnuts, azuki beans, matsutake, beef, wild boar and venison. Tourism, including agritourism, is playing an increasing role in the local economy.

== Education ==
Tamba-Sasayama has 14 public elementary schools and six public middle schools operated by the city government and three public high schools operated by the Hyōgo Prefectural Department of Education.

== Transportation ==
=== Railway ===
JR West – Fukuchiyama Line

- Kusano - Furuichi - Minami-Yashiro - Sasayamaguchi - Tamba-Ōyama

=== Highways ===
- Maizuru-Wakasa Expressway
- National Route 173
- National Route 176
- National Route 372

== Sister cities ==
- Walla Walla, Washington, United States, since August 15, 1972
- Epidaurus, Greece, since May 26, 1988

== Local attractions ==
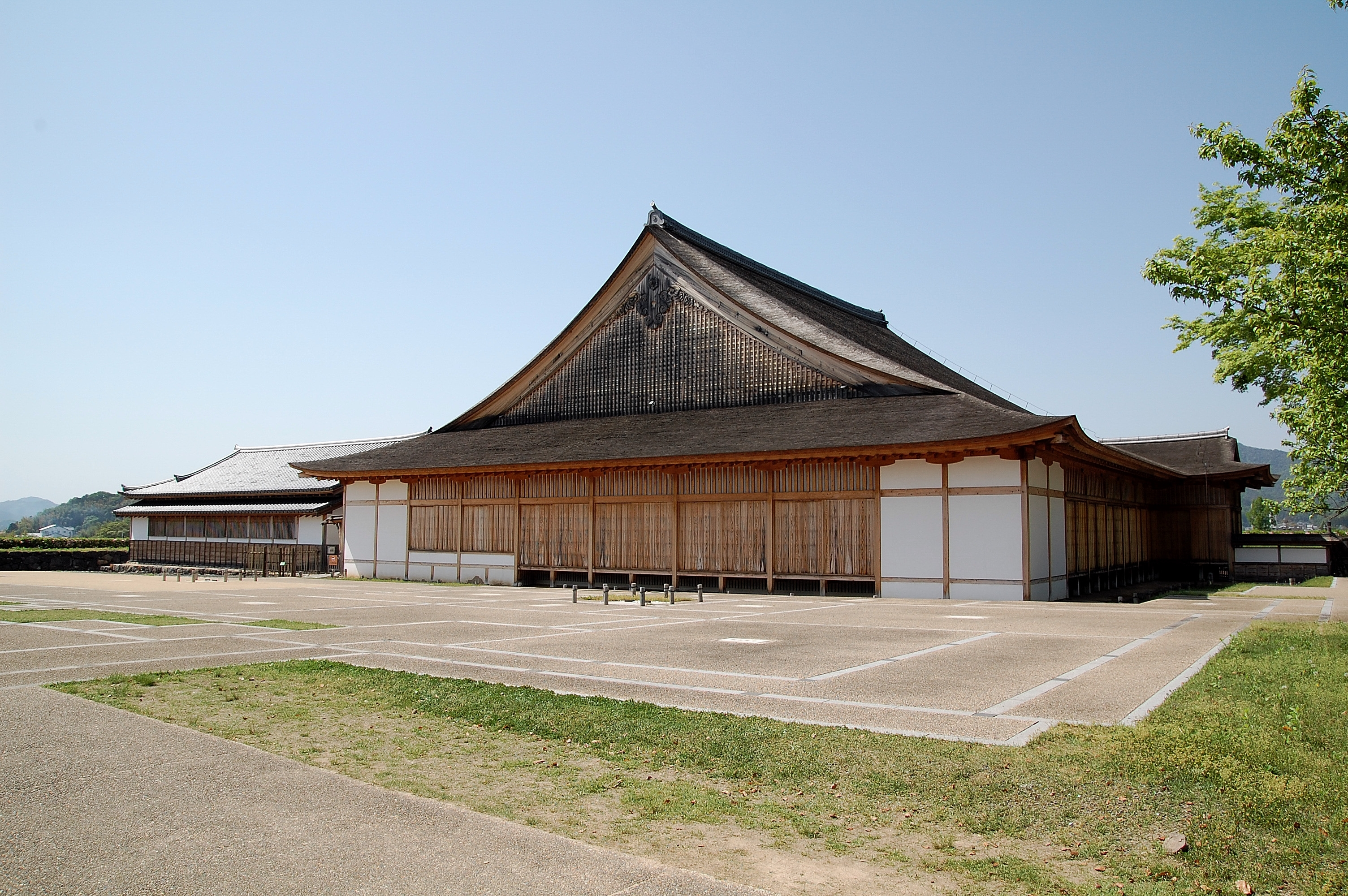
Main Hall, Sasayama Castle

- Fukuzumi Traditional Buildings Preservation Area
- Mount Mitake
- Mount Nishigatake
- Mount Yajuro
- Sasayama Castle ruins, National Historic Site
- Sasayama Traditional Buildings Preservation Area
- Yakami Castle ruins, National Historic Site

== Festivals ==
The Dekansho Festival, famous for "Bon" style dancing, is held annually, every August 15 through 16 since 1952.

== Local products ==
- Tamba ware, or Tachikui ware (丹波立杭焼, Tamba-Tachikui-yaki), is a traditional style of pottery that has been produced here since the 12th century.

Tamba Sasayama's pottery is one of the Six Ancient Kilns. Tamba Sasayama is also the home of the Kamanjyo, a climbing kiln deemed a cultural property from Japan heritage.
