= Matsuo Station =

Matsuo Station is the name of three train stations in Japan:

- Matsuo Station (Chiba)
- Matsuo Station (Mie)
- Matsuo Station (Nagasaki)

It may also refer to:

- Matsuo-taisha Station, formerly called Matsuo Station
