= Mount Mitake (Hyōgo) =

Mountain in Hyōgo Prefecture, Japan

- 御嶽
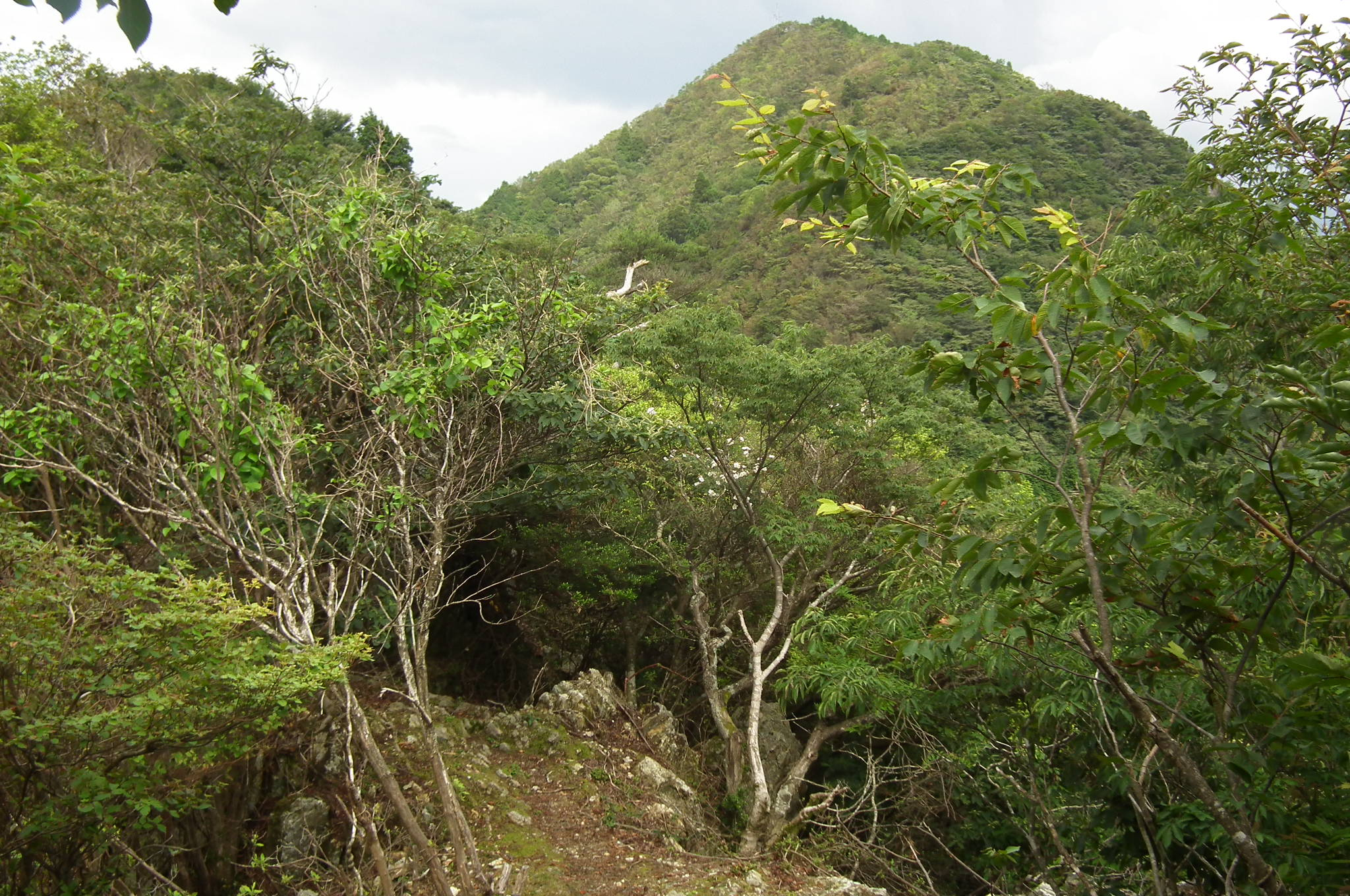

Highest point
- Elevation: 793.4 m (2,603 ft)
- Coordinates: 35°7.38′N 135°14.41′E

Naming
- Language of name: Japanese
- Pronunciation: [mitake]

Geography
- Location: Sasayama, Hyōgo, Japan
- Parent range: Taki Mountains

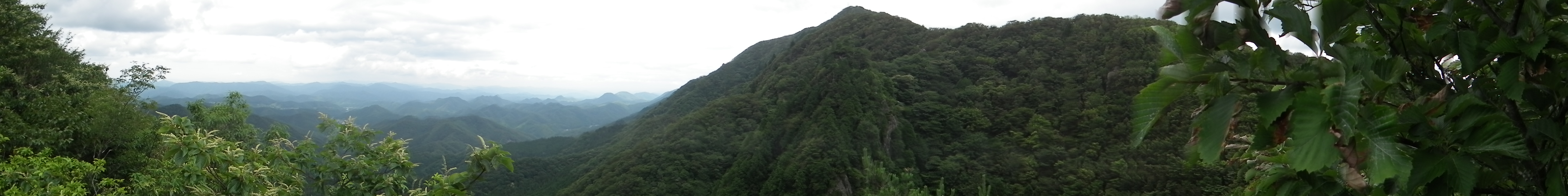
The mountains around Mitake

Mount Mitake (御嶽, Mitake) is a 793 m (2,602 ft) high Japanese mountain located around 50 km (31 mi) north of Kobe in Hyōgo Prefecture. It should not be confused with Mount Mitake, a mountain in Tokyo, or Mount Ontake in Nagano Prefecture written with the same characters. This mountain is one of the 50 famous mountains in Hyōgo Prefecture.

== History ==
Mount Mitake is the highest mountain in the Taki Mountains, including Mount Nishigatake and Mount Koganegadake. The Taki Mountains were one of the most holiest places for shugendō from Kamakura period to Muromachi period. However, Tanba Shugendō, a sect of Shugendo in Tanba Province, lost against Yamato Shugendō, another Shugendo sect of Yamato Province including Mount Ōmine, all of the temples in the Taki Mountains were burned in 1482.

== Gallery ==
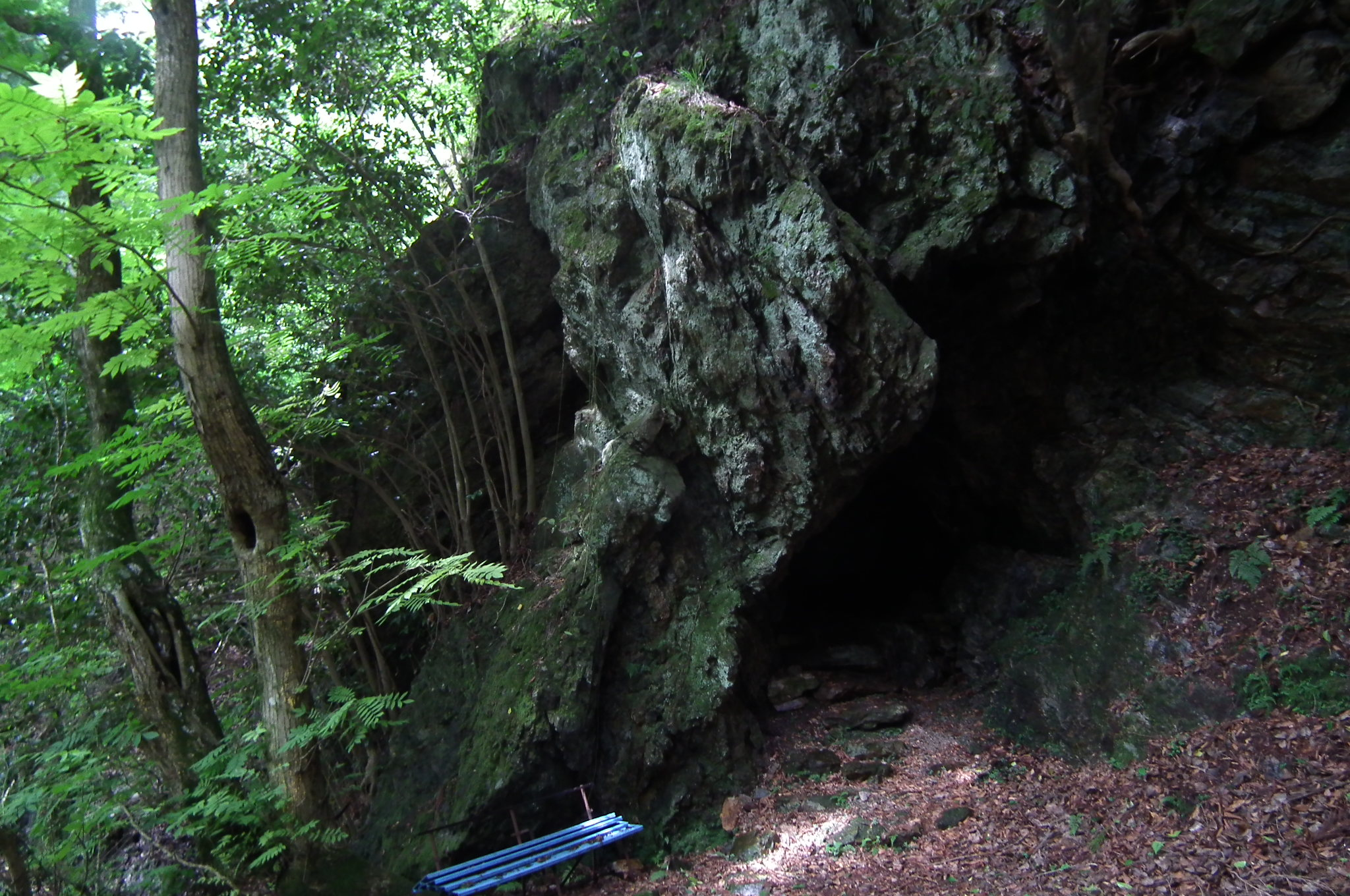
Aizen-kutsu

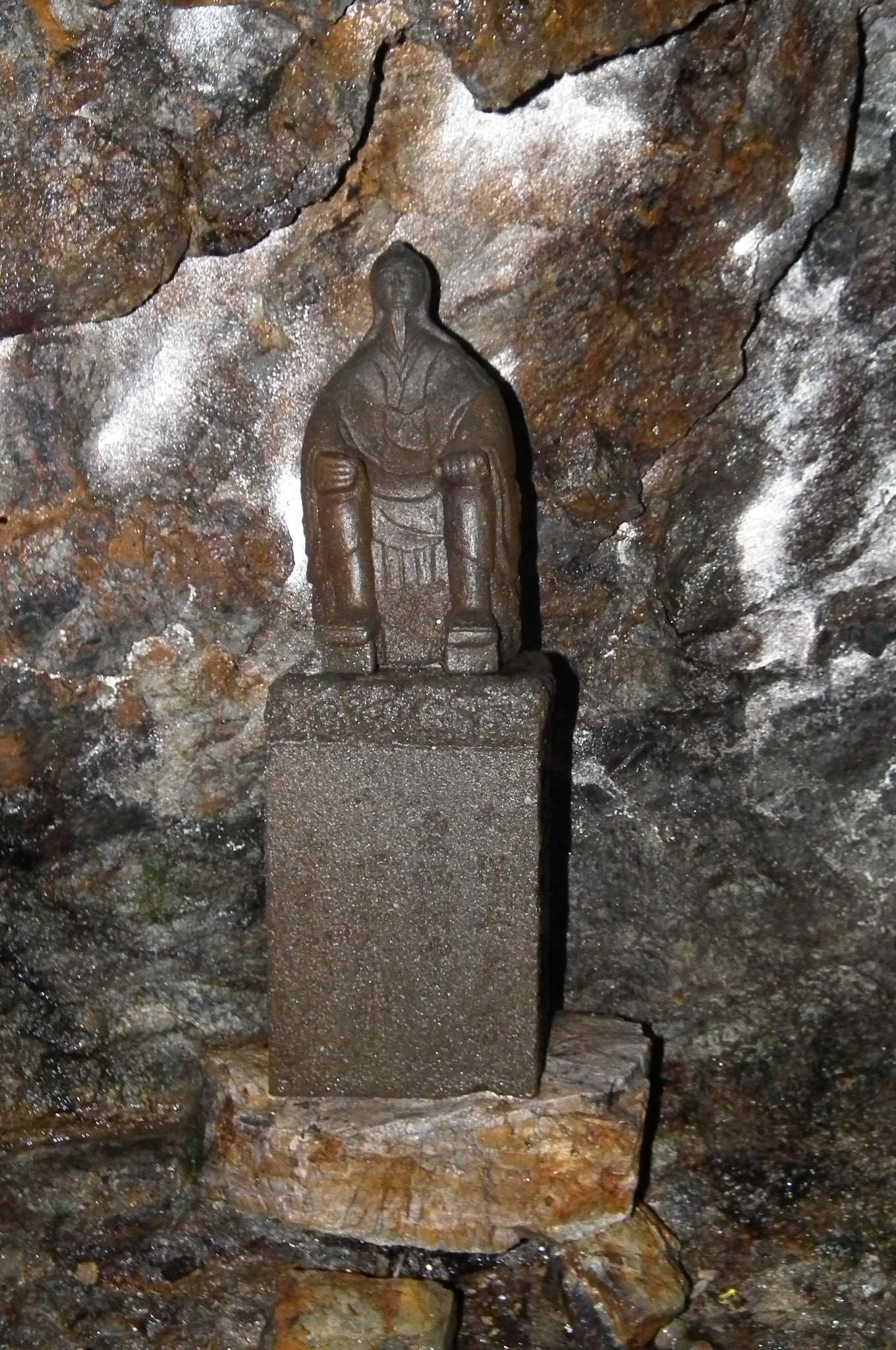
The God of Love in the cave(Rāgarāja).

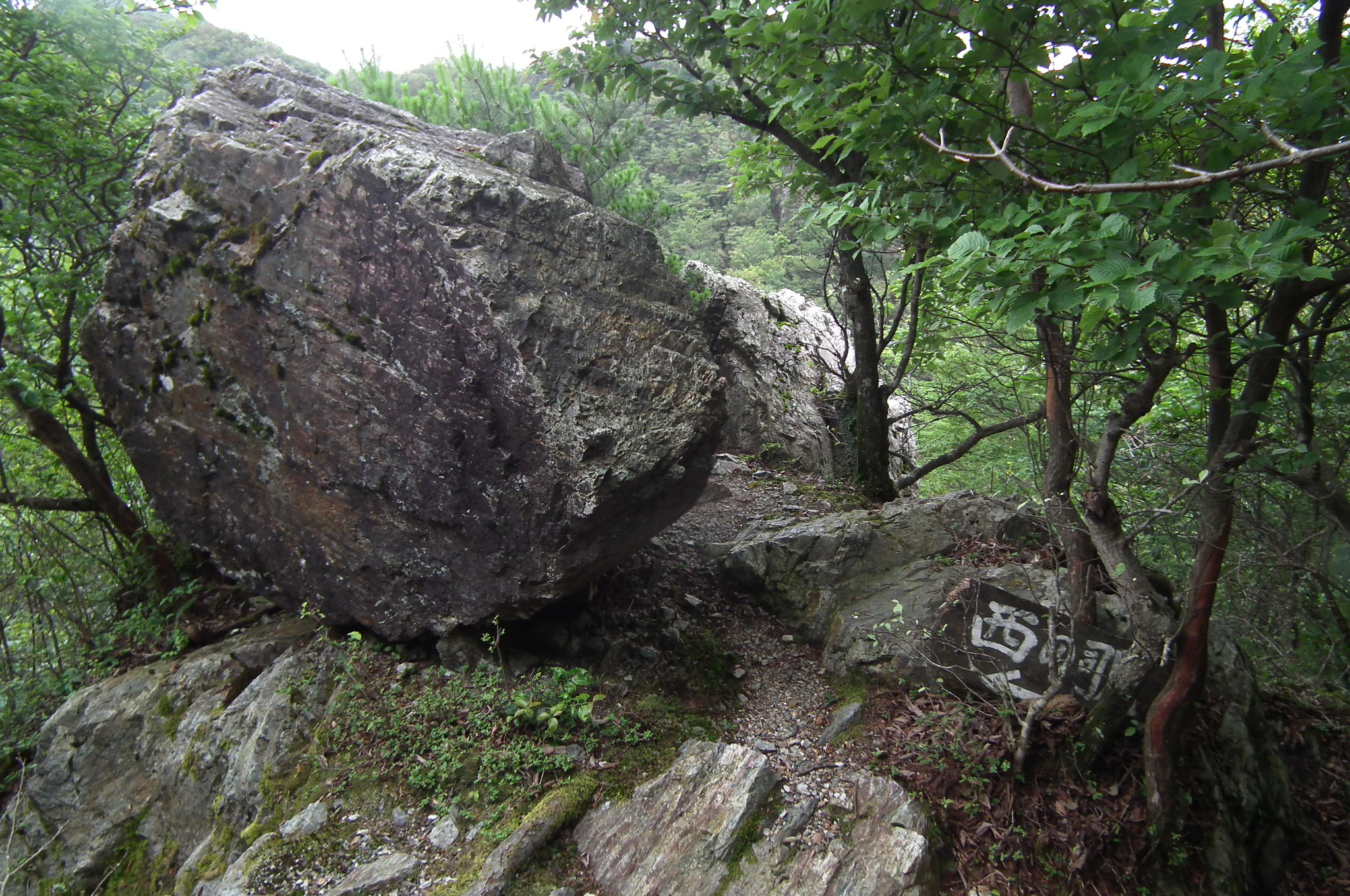
Nisshi-no-nozoki

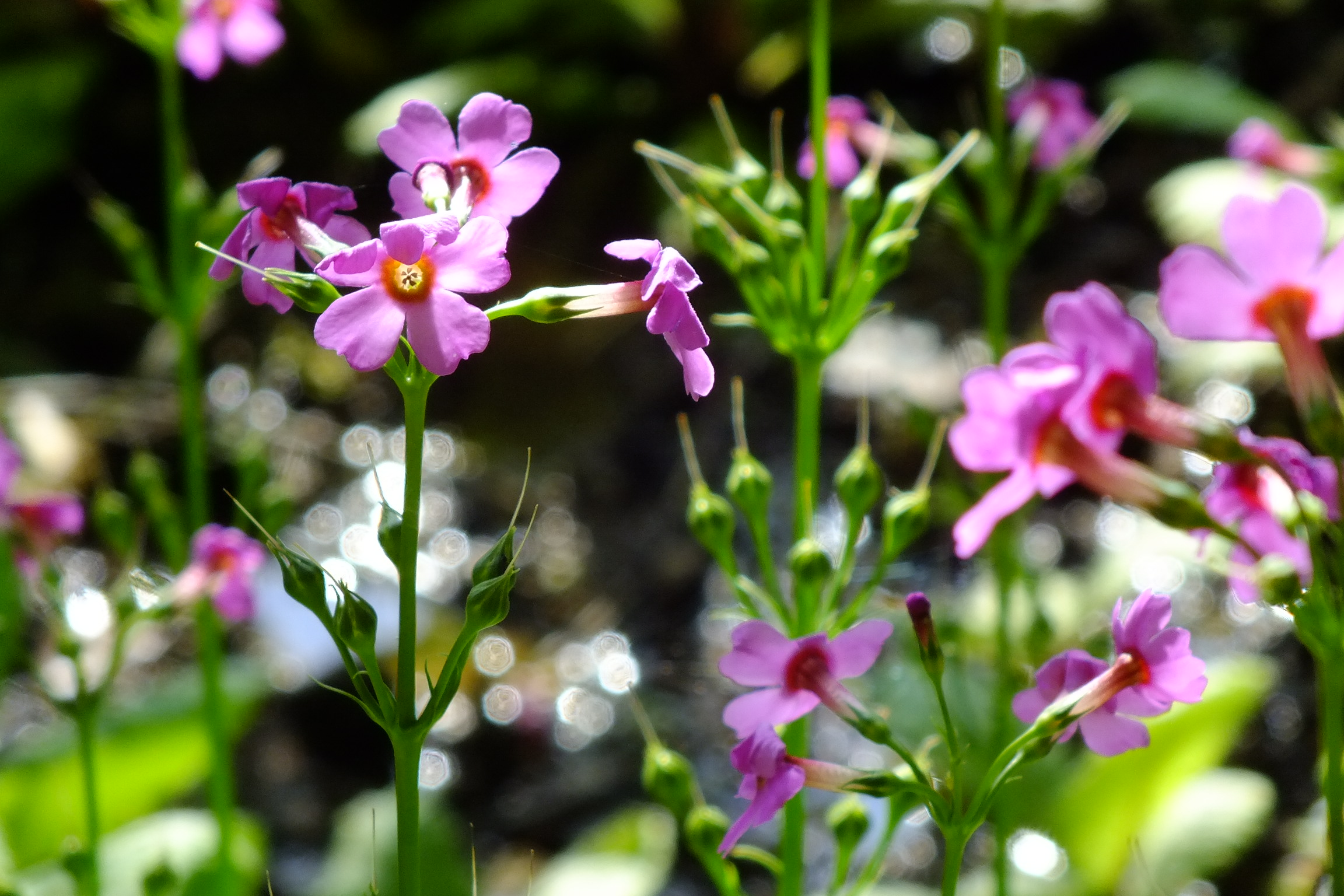
Primula japonica

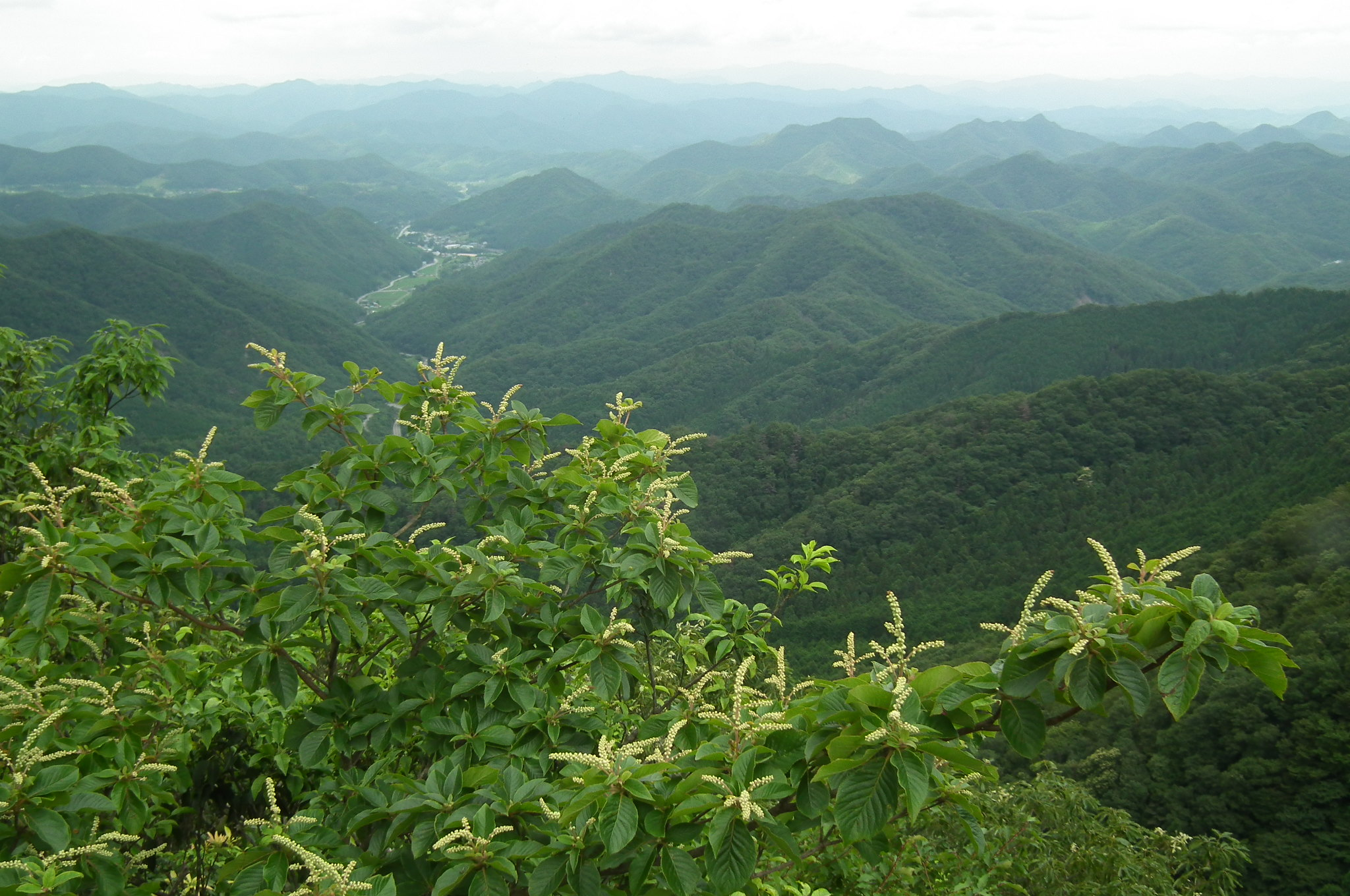
The mountains around Mitake

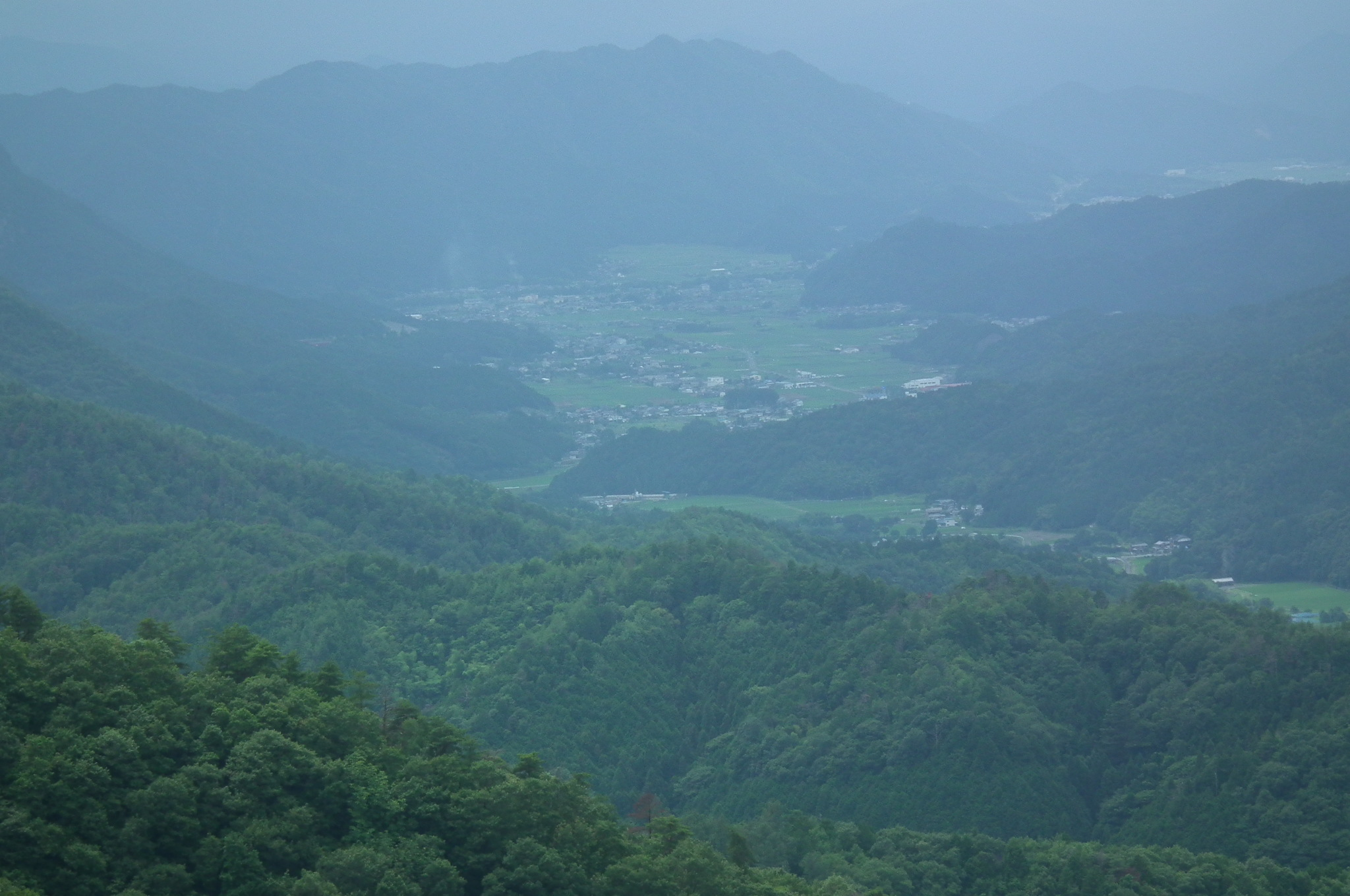
Sasayama city
