= Japan National Route 372 =

Road in Japan

National Route 372
- 国道372号
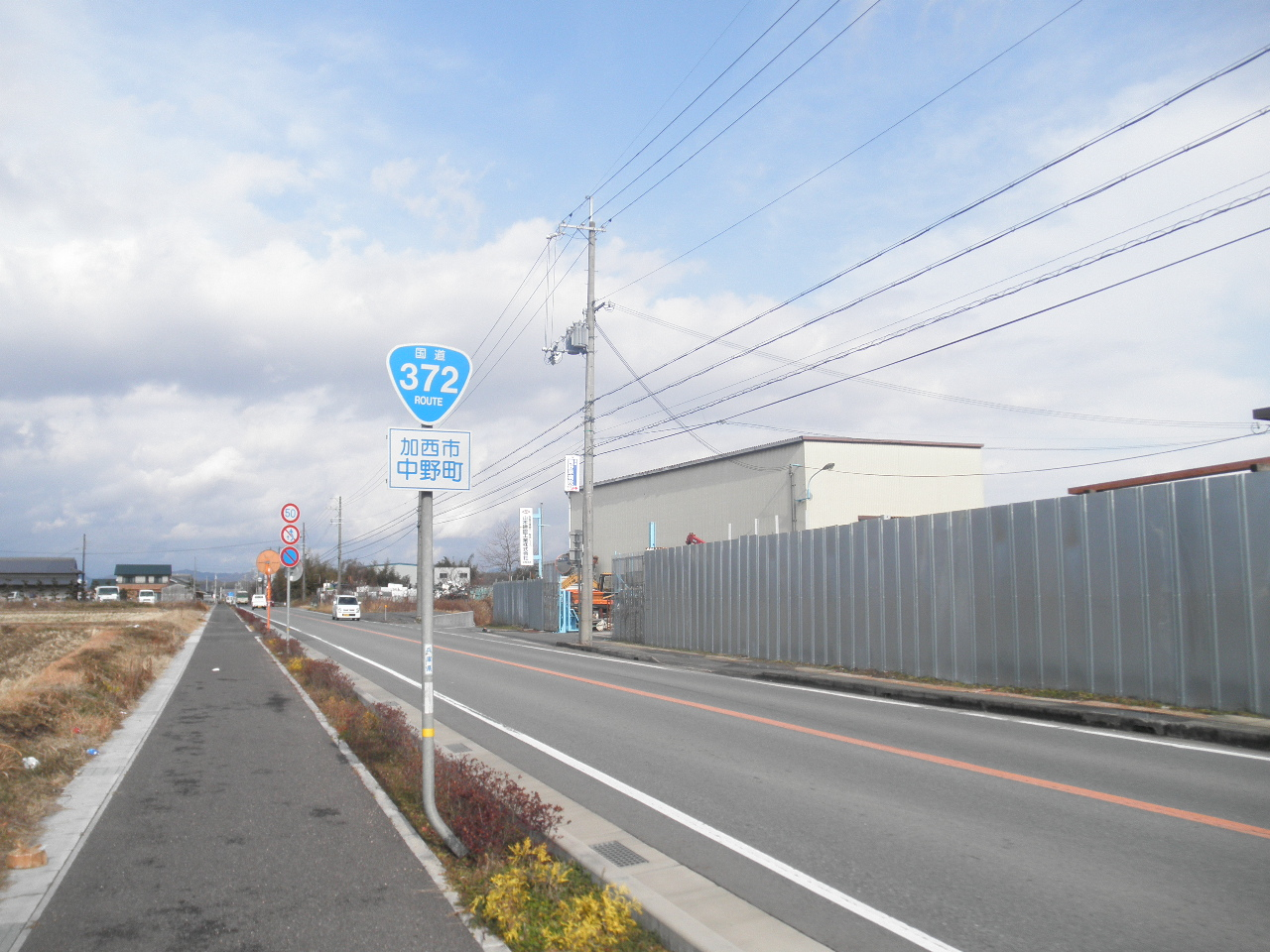

Route information
- Length: 102 km (63 mi)

Location
- Country: Japan

Highway system
- National highways of Japan; Expressways of Japan
← National Route 371	→ National Route 373

National Route 372 is a national highway of Japan connecting Kameoka, Kyoto and Himeji, Hyōgo in Japan, with a total length of 102 km (63.38 mi).
