= Sasayamaguchi Station =

Railway station in Tamba-Sasayama, Hyōgo Prefecture, Japan

Sasayamaguchi Station 篠山口駅
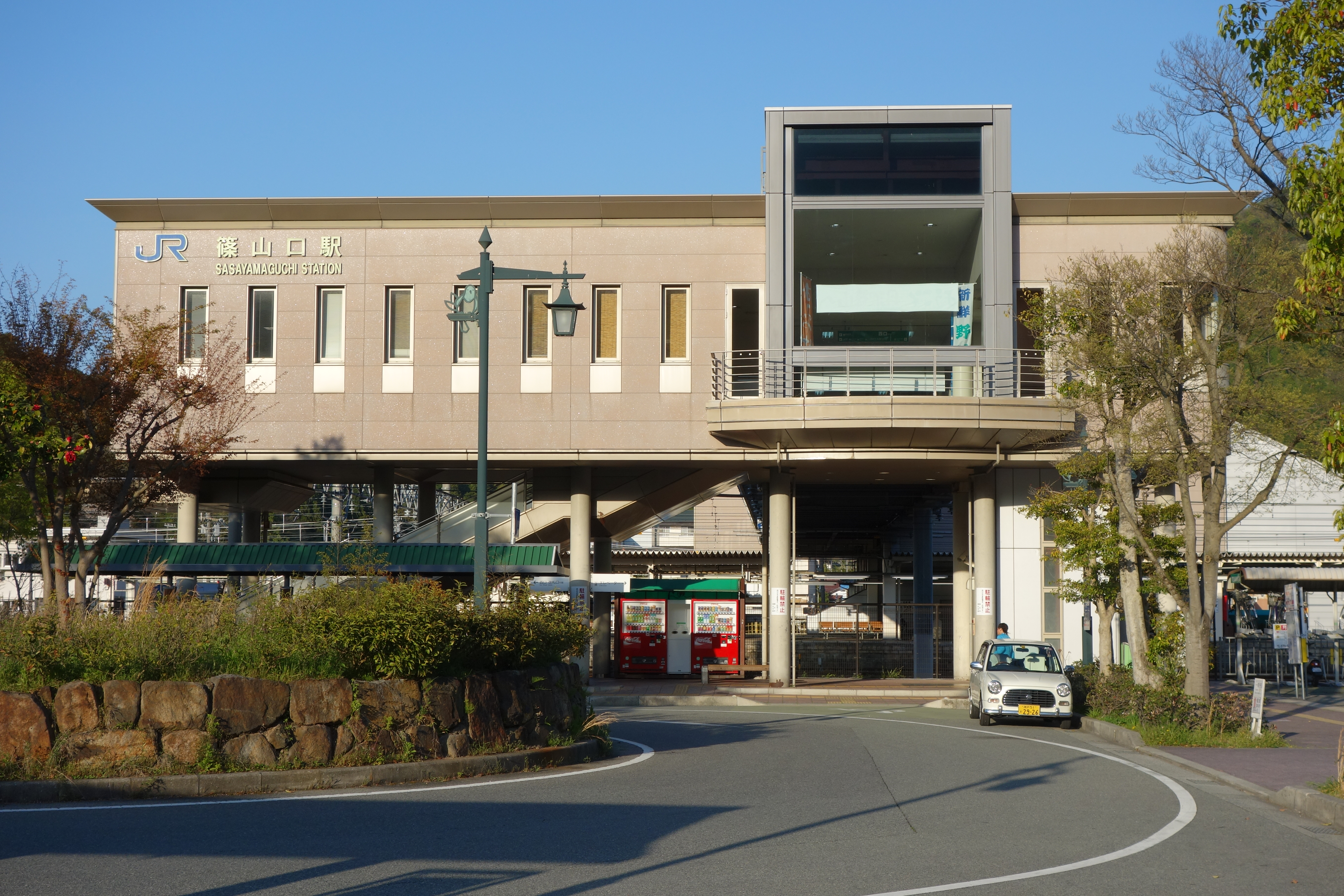
- Sasayamaguchi Station in April 2013

General information
- Location: Ozawa, Tamba-Sasayama-shi, Hyōgo-ken 669-2212; Japan
- Coordinates: 35°3′22.35″N 135°10′39.46″E
- Owner: West Japan Railway Company
- Operator: West Japan Railway Company
- Lines: Fukuchiyama Line (JR Takarazuka Line)
- Distance: 58.4 km (36.3 miles) from Amagasaki
- Platforms: 1 island + 1 side platform
- Connections: Bus stop

Construction
- Structure type: Ground level
- Accessible: None

Other information
- Status: Staffed
- Station code: JR-G69
- Website: Official website

History
- Opened: 25 March 1899
- Former names: Sasayama Station (to 1944)

Passengers
- FY2016: 3532 daily
Location
- Location within Hyōgo Prefecture Location within Japan

Sasayamaguchi Station (篠山口駅, Sasayamaguchi-eki) is a passenger railway station located in the city of Tamba-Sasayama, Hyōgo Prefecture, Japan, operated by West Japan Railway Company (JR West).

== Lines ==
Sasayamaguchi Station is served by the Fukuchiyama Line, and is located 58.4 kilometers from the terminus of the line at Amagasaki.

== Station layout ==
The station consists of one ground-level island platform and one ground-level side platform connected by an elevated station building. The station is staffed.

=== Platforms ===
1, 3, 4	■ JR Takarazuka Line	for Sanda, Takarazuka and Ōsaka
1, 3, 4	■ Fukuchiyama Line	for Fukuchiyama and Toyooka

- Track 1 is mainly used for the Limited express trains "Kounotori" for Osaka and Shin-Osaka (partly from Track 3). It is also used for the rapid services for Osaka.
- Track 3 is mainly used for the trains for Fukuchiyama. It is sometimes used for the trains for Osaka.
- Track 4 is mainly used for the regional rapid services for Osaka. It is sometimes used for the local trains for Fukuchiyama. Fukuchiyama-bound trains (except limited express trains) are uncoupled at Track 4 in the evening, uncoupled cars become bound for Osaka.

== Adjacent stations ==
«	Service	»
Fukuchiyama Line
Minami-Yashiro	Local trains	Tamba-Ōyama
Minami-Yashiro	Regional Rapid Service	Terminus
Minami-Yashiro	Rapid Service	Terminus
Minami-Yashiro	Tambaji Rapid Service	Tamba-Ōyama
Sanda	Limited Express "Konotori"	Kaibara
Japan National Railway (JNR) Sasayama Line (abandoned)
Terminus	-	Sasayama
Sasayama Railway Line (Sasayama Station when abandoned)
Terminus	-	Higashibuki

== History ==
Sasayamaguchi Station opened on 25 March 1899 as Sasayama Station (篠山駅). It was renamed to its present name on 1 March 1944. With the privatization of the Japan National Railways (JNR) on 1 April 1987, the station came under the aegis of the West Japan Railway Company.

Station numbering was introduced in March 2018 with Sasayamaguchi being assigned station number JR-G69.

== Passenger statistics ==
In fiscal 2016, the station was used by an average of 3532 passengers daily

== Surrounding area ==
- former Tannan Town
- Japan National Route 176

== See also ==
- List of railway stations in Japan
