= Kitakinki =

Japanese limited express train service

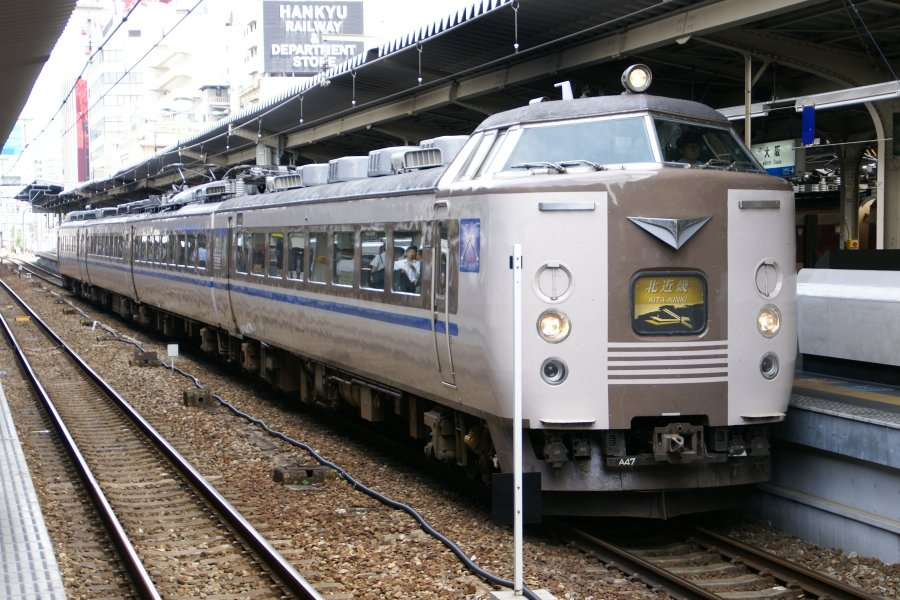
- 183 series EMU on a Kitakinki service, September 2007

Overview
- Service type: Limited express
- First service: 1986
- Last service: 2011
- Current operator: JR West

Route
- Lines used: Tokaido Main Line, Fukuchiyama Line, Sanin Main Line

Technical
- Rolling stock: 183 series EMU
- Operating speed: 120 km/h (75 mph) (max.)

The Kitakinki (北近畿) was a limited express train service operated by West Japan Railway Company (JR West) in Japan from 1986 until March 2011, which ran from Shin-Osaka to Kinosaki Onsen in Hyōgo Prefecture.

== Service pattern and station stops ==
As of January 2011, 11 down services (Kitakinki 1–21) from Shin-Osaka and 10 up services (Kitakinki 2–26) to Shin-Osaka ran daily, with the journey time from Shin-Osaka to Kinosaki Onsen taking approximately 2 hours 45 minutes.

Kitakinki services stopped at the following stations. (Stations in parentheses were not served by all trains.)

Shin-Osaka - Amagasaki - Takarazuka - Sanda - (Shin-Sanda) - (Aino) - Sasayamaguchi - (Tanikawa) - Kaibara - Isō - (Kuroi) - Fukuchiyama - (Wadayama) - (Yōka) - (Ebara) - (Toyooka) - (Kinosaki Onsen)

== History ==
The Kitakinki service was introduced on 1 November 1986. The new services used 4- and 6-car DC 183-800 series electric multiple units converted from former dual-voltage (AC/DC) 485 series EMUs. These received a thin crimson line below the window band to signify the improved passenger accommodation.

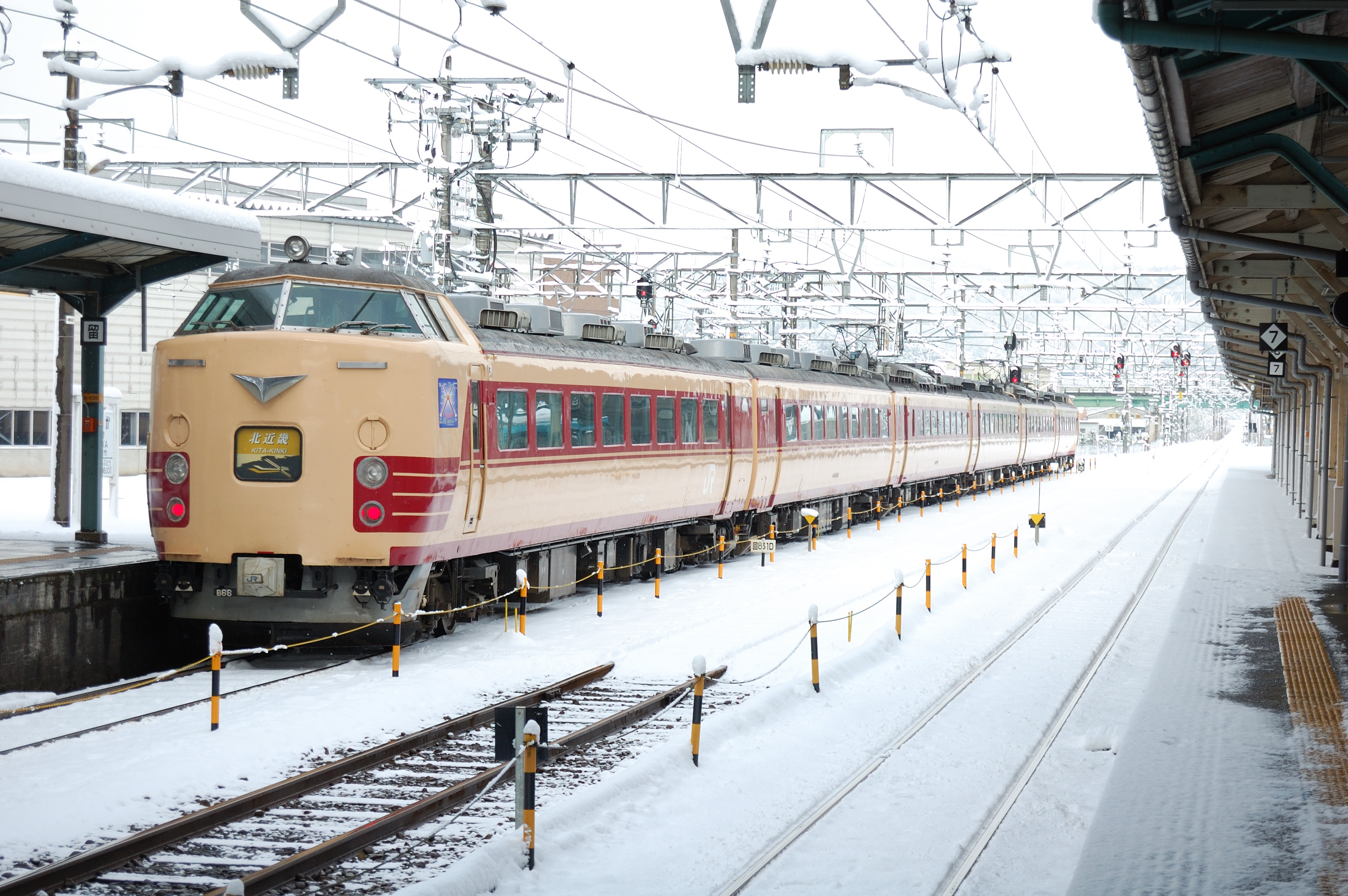
183 series on a Kitakinki service in revised JNR livery, January 2010

Services used 4- or 7-car 183 series formations.

From 18 March 2007, all cars were made non-smoking.

From 12 March 2011, Kitakinki services were rebranded as Kounotori, coinciding with the introduction of new 287 series EMUs.
