= Tango Explorer =

Japanese limited express train service (1990–2011)

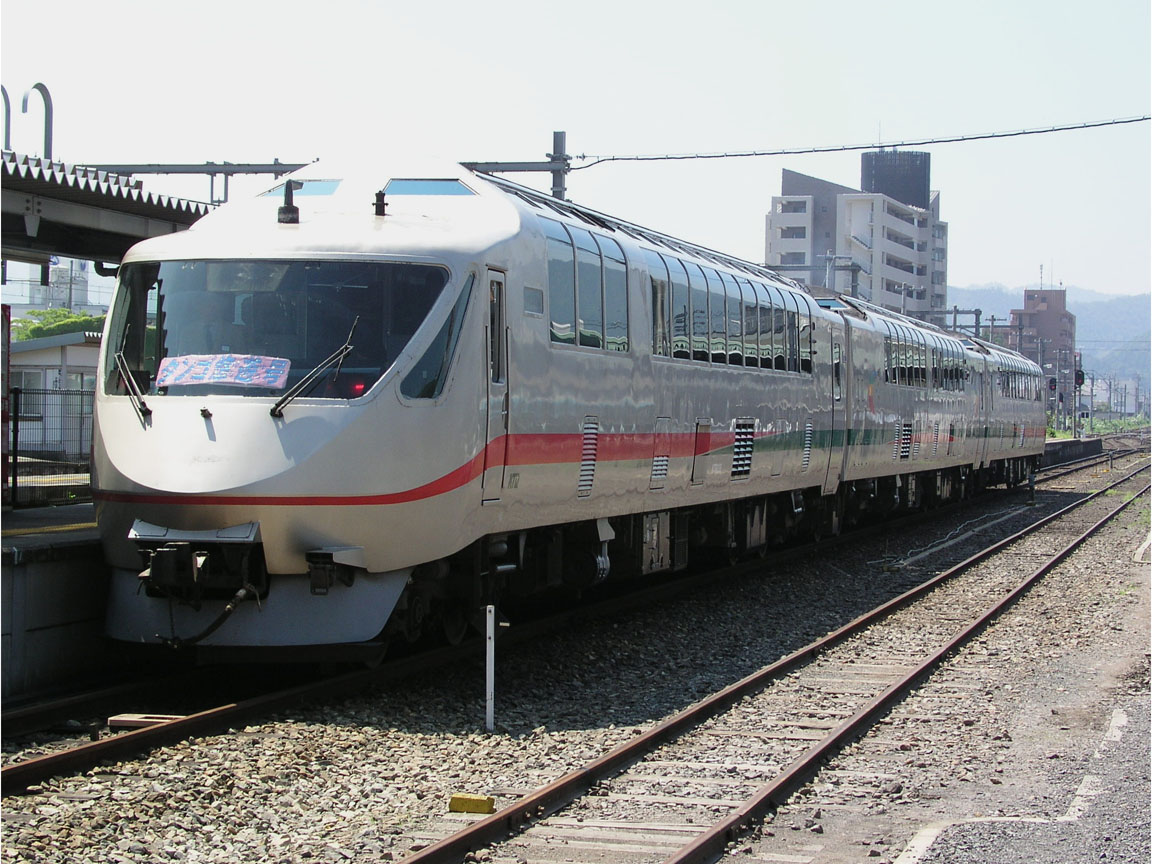
- Tango Explorer at Nishi-Maizuru Station

Overview
- Service type: Intercity rail, Limited express
- Status: Discontinued
- Locale: Ōsaka, Hyōgo, Kyōto Prefectures
- First service: 1990
- Last service: 2011
- Former operator(s): Kitakinki Tango Railway, JR West

Route
- Termini: Shin-Osaka; Miyazu, Toyooka
- Stops: 21
- Distance travelled: 207.3 km (128.8 mi)
- Average journey time: 3 hours 19 minutes
- Service frequency: Two round trips daily

On-board services
- Class(es): Unreserved, reserved, and Green class seating

Technical
- Rolling stock: Kitakinki Tango Railway KTR001 series DMU
- Track gauge: 1,067 mm (3 ft 6 in)
- Electrification: Diesel

Tango Explorer (タンゴエクスプローラー, Tango-ekusupurōrā) was a limited express service operated by Kitakinki Tango Railway and West Japan Railway Company (JR West) between Shin-Osaka and Miyazu and/or Toyooka stations. The term also referred to the KTR001 series (currently used for Tango Relay services between Fukuchiyama and Toyooka) rolling stock itself. "Tango" refers to the Tango (丹後) region of northern Kyoto Prefecture.

Prior to 1999, the Tango Explorer operated from Kyoto Station, but with the introduction of the Tango Discovery service, Tango Explorer services begi at Shin-Osaka.

The service operated from 1990 to 2011.

== Services ==
Tango Explorer services were generally run with three-car trains, though during peak holiday periods six-car trains (three paired sets) are used. When the Tango Explorer KTR001 series trainset was out of operation, KTR8000 series DMUs (used on the Tango Discovery service) or JNR 183 series EMUs were sometimes used.

Terminuses are in bold.

Shin-Osaka - Osaka - Amagasaki - Takarazuka - Sanda - (Shin-Sanda) - (Aino) - Sasayamaguchi - (Tanikawa) - Kaibara - (Kuroi) - Fukuchiyama - Ōe - Miyazu - Amanohashidate - Nodagawa - Tango-Ōmiya - Mineyama - Amino - Kumihama - Toyooka

- The Tango Explorer 2 stopped at Kuroi and Tanikawa.
- The Tango Explorer 3 stopped at Shin-Sanda, Aino, Tanikawa and Kuroi.
