= Takedao Station =

Railway station in Takarazuka, Hyōgo Prefecture, Japan

Takedao Station 武田尾駅
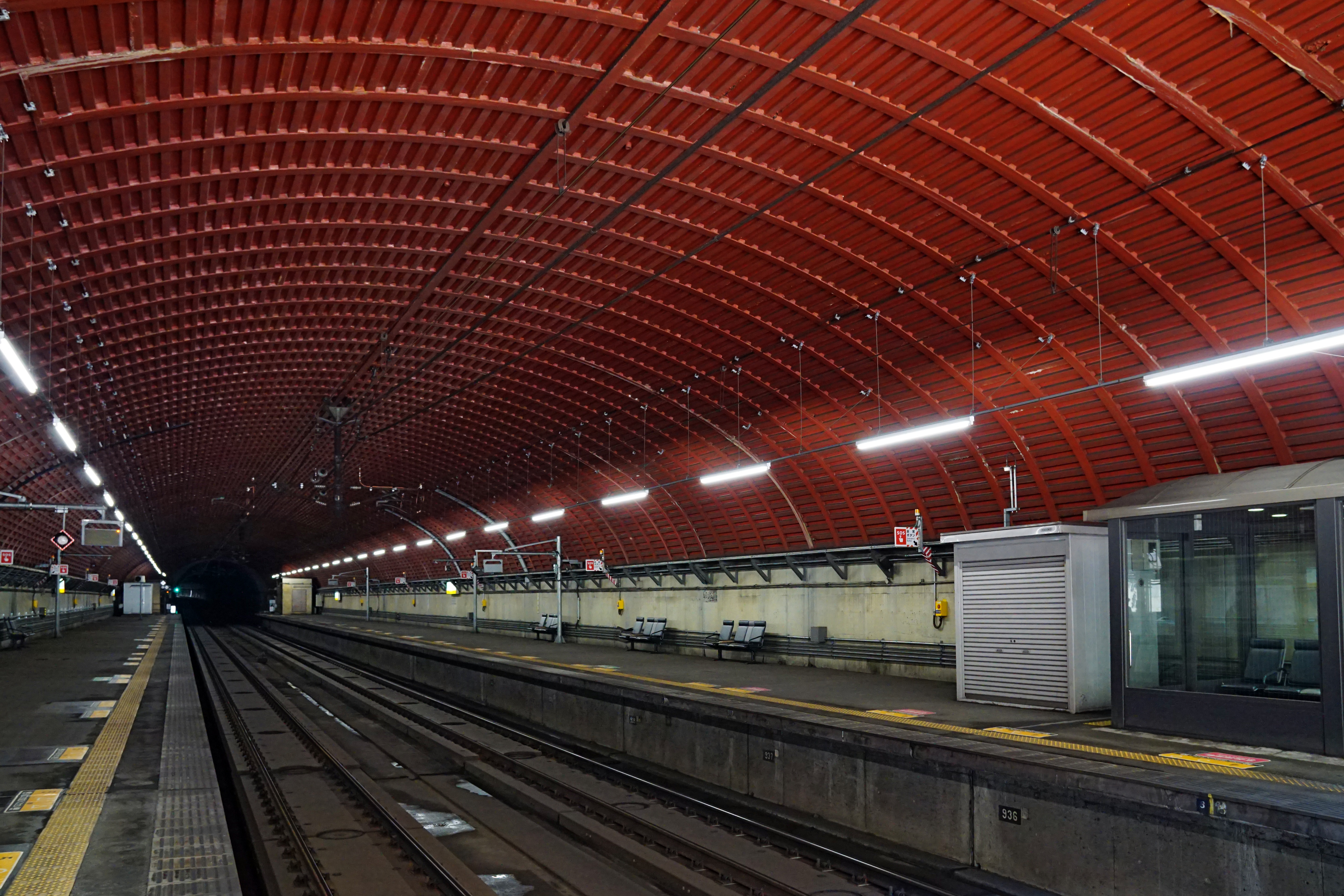
- Takedao Station in August 2015

General information
- Location: Izuriha Tamase, Takarazuka-shi, Hyōgo-ken 669-1231; Japan
- Coordinates: 34°51′18.23″N 135°18′21.82″E
- Owner: West Japan Railway Company
- Operator: West Japan Railway Company
- Lines: Fukuchiyama Line (JR Takarazuka Line)
- Distance: 25.1 km (15.6 miles) from Amagasaki
- Platforms: 2 side platforms
- Connections: Bus stop

Construction
- Structure type: Elevated
- Accessible: None

Other information
- Status: Unstaffed
- Station code: JR-G59
- Website: Official website

History
- Opened: 25 January 1899

Passengers
- FY2016: 567 daily
Location
- Location within Hyōgo Prefecture Location within Japan

Takedao Station (武田尾駅, Takedao-eki) is a passenger railway station located in the city of Takarazuka, Hyōgo Prefecture, Japan. It is operated by the West Japan Railway Company (JR West).

== Lines ==
Takedao Station is served by the Fukuchiyama Line (JR Takarazuka Line), and is located 25.1 kilometers from the terminus of the line at Amagasaki and 32.8 kilometers from Osaka.

== Station layout ==
The station consists of two opposed elevated side platforms. The mid half of the platform is on a bridge (2nd Mukogawa Bridge), and each end is in a different tunnel (1st Takedao Tunnel and the ? tunnel, respectively). Also, the Osaka side of the bridge is Nishinomiya, Hyōgo city. Although it is an elevated station, it has no elevators or escalators, so it is difficult for users such as wheelchairs. The station is unattended.

=== Platforms ===
| 1, 2 | ■ Fukuchiyama Line (JR Takarazuka Line) | for Sanda and Takarazuka |
| 3 | ■ Fukuchiyama Line (JR Takarazuka Line) | for Sasayamaguchi and Fukuchiyama |

== Adjacent stations ==
| « | Service | » |
Fukuchiyama Line (JR Takarazuka Line)
| Nishinomiyanajio | Local trains | Dōjō |
| Nishinomiyanajio | Regional Rapid Service | Dōjō |
Rapid Service: Does not stop at this station
Tambaji Rapid Service: Does not stop at this station

== History ==
Takedao Station opened on 25 January 1899, as a station of Hankaku Railway, which was nationalized in 1907. With the privatization of the Japan National Railways (JNR) on 1 April 1987, the station came under the aegis of the West Japan Railway Company.

Station numbering was introduced in March 2018 with Takedao being assigned station number JR-G59.

== Passenger statistics ==
In fiscal 2016, the station was used by an average of 567 passengers daily

== Surrounding area ==
- Takedao Onsen
- Satoyama Park

== See also ==
- List of railway stations in Japan
