= Nishinomiya-Najio Station =

Railway station in Nishinomiya, Hyōgo Prefecture, Japan

Nishinomiya-Najio Station 西宮名塩駅
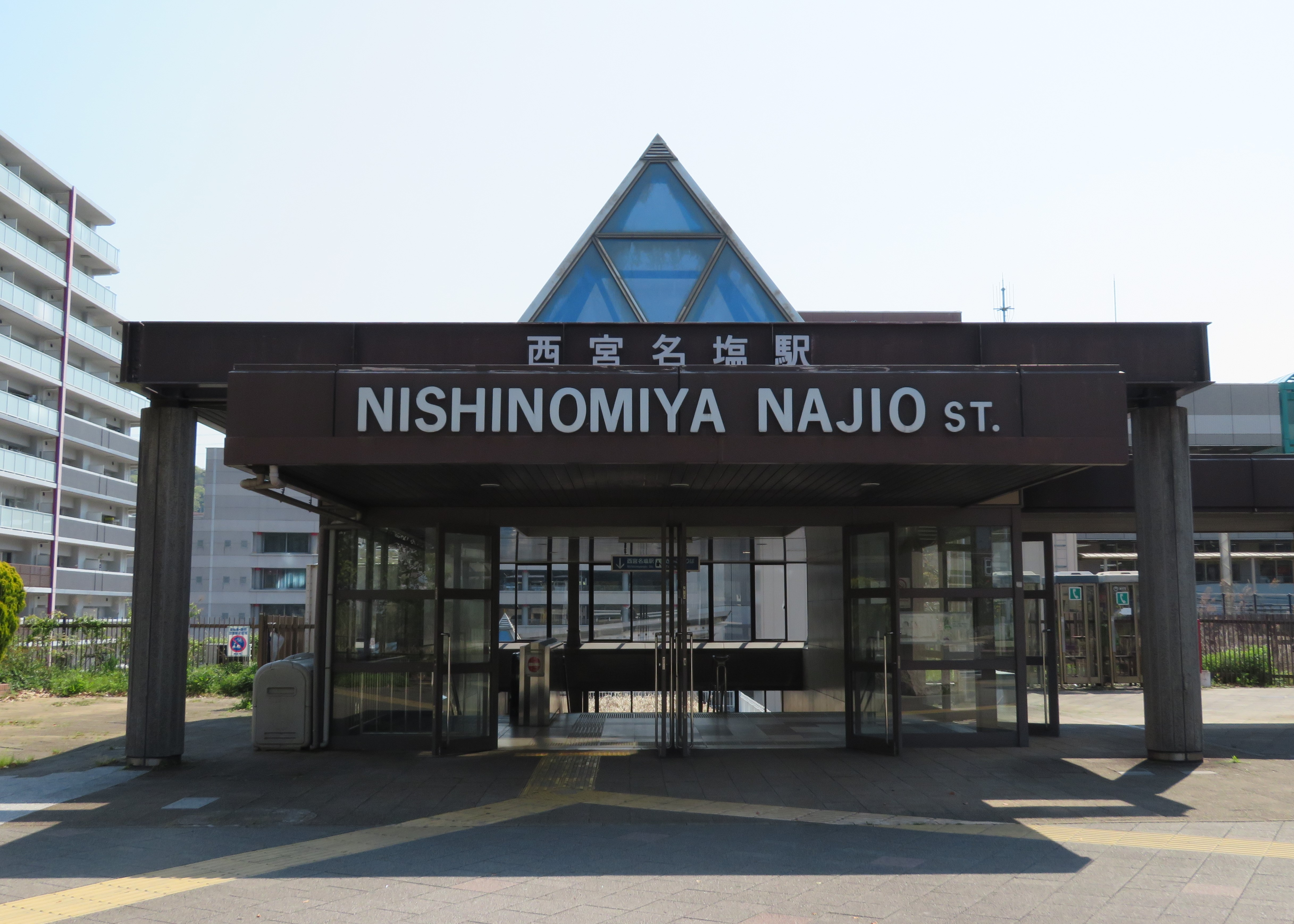
- Nishinomiya-Najio Station entrance in July 2008

General information
- Location: Najioshinmachi 5021-7, Nishinomiya-shi, Hyōgo-ken 669-1134; Japan
- Coordinates: 34°49′36.5″N 135°18′32″E
- Owner: West Japan Railway Company
- Operator: West Japan Railway Company
- Lines: Fukuchiyama Line (JR Takarazuka Line)
- Distance: 21.9 km (13.6 miles) from Amagasaki
- Platforms: 2 side platforms
- Connections: Bus stop

Construction
- Structure type: Ground level
- Accessible: Yes

Other information
- Status: Staffed (Midori no Madoguchi )
- Station code: JR-G58
- Website: Official website

History
- Opened: 1 November 1986

Passengers
- FY2016: 9188 daily
Location
- Location within Hyōgo Prefecture Location within Japan

Nishinomiya-Najio Station (西宮名塩駅, Nishinomiya-Najio-eki) is a passenger railway station located in the city of Nishinomiya, Hyōgo Prefecture, Japan. It is operated by the West Japan Railway Company (JR West).

== Lines ==
Nishinomiya-Najio Station Station is served by the Fukuchiyama Line (JR Takarazuka Line), and is located 21.9 kilometers from the terminus of the line at Amagasaki and 29.6 kilometers from Osaka.

== Station layout ==
The station consists of two opposed elevated side platforms with station building underneath. The station is sandwiched between tunnels on both sides. Furthermore, part of the platform is on a bridge over the Najio River. The station consists of three levels: the top level is the entrance, the middle level is the pedestrian entrance and ticket gates, and the bottom level is the platform. The station has a Midori no Madoguchi staffed ticket office.

=== Platforms ===
1	■ Fukuchiyama Line (JR Takarazuka Line)	for Sanda and Sasayamaguchi
2	■ Fukuchiyama Line (JR Takarazuka Line)	for Takarazuka, Osaka and Kitashinchi

== Adjacent stations ==
«	Service	»
Fukuchiyama Line (JR Takarazuka Line)
Namaze	Local trains	Takedao
Namaze	Regional Rapid Service	Takedao
Takarazuka	Rapid Service	Sanda
Takarazuka	Tambaji Rapid Service	Sanda

== History ==
Nishinomiya-Najio Station opened on 1 November 1986. With the privatization of the Japan National Railways (JNR) on 1 April 1987, the station came under the aegis of the West Japan Railway Company.

Station numbering was introduced in March 2018 with Nishinomiya-Naijo being assigned station number JR-G58.

== Passenger statistics ==
In fiscal 2016, the station was used by an average of 9188 passengers daily

== Surrounding area ==
- Nishinomiya Najio New Town
- Shiose Central Park
- Shiose Community Center

== See also ==
- List of railway stations in Japan
