= Tamba-Takeda Station =

Railway station in Tamba, Hyōgo Prefecture, Japan

Tamba-Takeda Station 丹波竹田駅
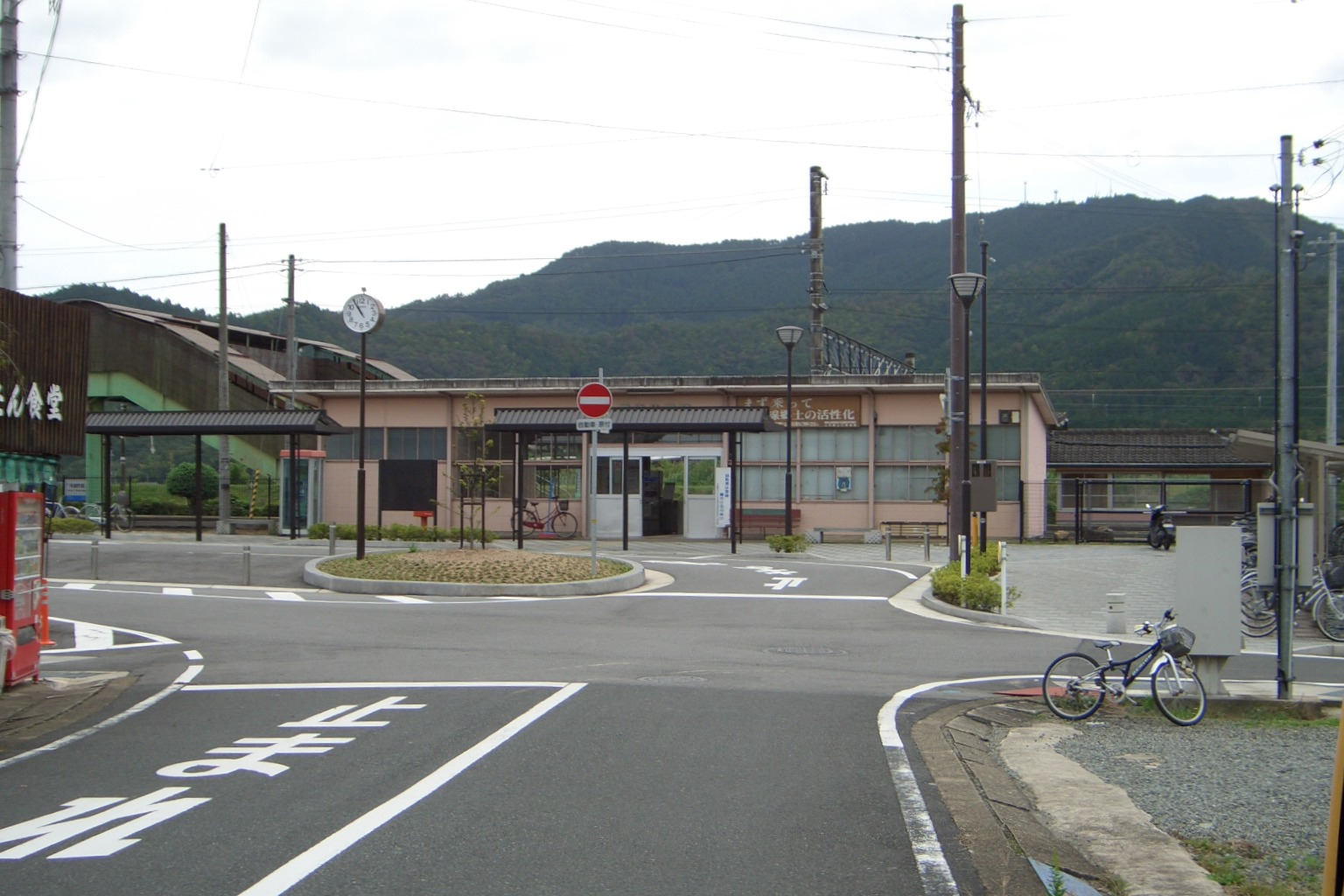
- Tamba-Takeda Station in August 2008

General information
- Location: Ichijimacho Nakatakeda, Tamba-shi, Hyōgo-ken 669-4302; Japan
- Coordinates: 35.2439°N 135.1337°E
- Owner: West Japan Railway Company
- Operator: West Japan Railway Company
- Line: Fukuchiyama Line
- Distance: 98.2 km (61.0 miles) from Amagasaki
- Platforms: 2 side platforms
- Connections: Bus stop

Other information
- Status: Unstaffed
- Website: Official website

History
- Opened: 15 July 1899
- Former names: Takeda (to 1911)

Passengers
- FY2016: 156 daily
Location
- Location within Hyōgo Prefecture Location within Japan

Tamba-Takeda Station (丹波竹田駅, Tamba-Takeda-eki) is a passenger railway station located in the city of Tamba, Hyōgo Prefecture, Japan, operated by West Japan Railway Company (JR West).

== Lines ==
Tamba-Takeda Station is served by the Fukuchiyama Line, and is located 98.2 kilometers from the terminus of the line at Amagasaki.

== Station layout ==
The station consists of two opposed ground-level side platforms connected to the station building by a footbridge. The station is unattended. The station building is located along the platform serving Track 1.

=== Platforms ===
1	■ Fukuchiyama Line	for Fukuchiyama
2	■ Fukuchiyama Line	for Sasayamaguchi and Sanda

== Adjacent stations ==
«	Service	»
Fukuchiyama Line
Ichijima	Local	Fukuchiyama
Ichijima	Tambaji Rapid Service	Fukuchiyama

== History ==
Tamba-Takeda Station opened on July 15, 1899 as Takeda Station (竹田駅). It was renamed to its present name on November 1, 1911. With the privatization of the Japan National Railways (JNR) on April 1, 1987, the station came under the aegis of the West Japan Railway Company.

== Passenger statistics ==
In fiscal 2016, the station was used by an average of 156 passengers daily

== Surrounding area ==
- Nishiyama Brewery
- Tamba Municipal Takeda Elementary School
- Tamba Municipal Sports Pier Ichijima

== See also ==
- List of railway stations in Japan
