= Ichijima Station =

Railway station in Tamba, Hyōgo Prefecture, Japan

Ichijima Station 市島駅
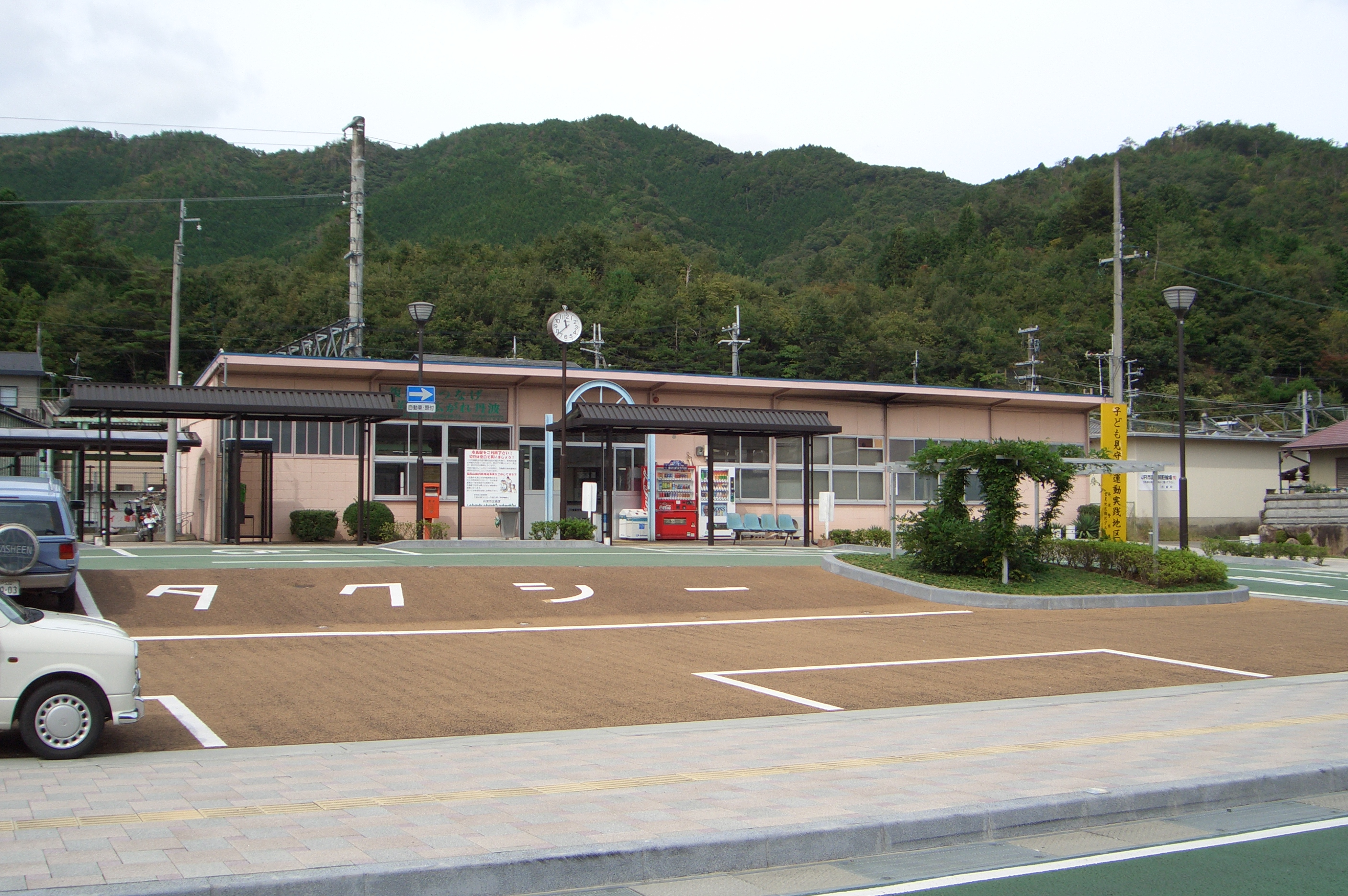
- Ichijima Station in October 2008

General information
- Location: Ichijimacho Ichijima, Tamba-shi, Hyōgo-ken 669-4324; Japan
- Coordinates: 35.2079°N 135.1305°E
- Owner: West Japan Railway Company
- Operator: West Japan Railway Company
- Line: Fukuchiyama Line
- Distance: 94.0 km (58.4 miles) from Amagasaki
- Platforms: 2 side platforms
- Connections: Bus stop

Other information
- Status: Unstaffed
- Website: Official website

History
- Opened: 15 July 1899

Passengers
- FY2016: 239 daily
Location
- Location within Hyōgo Prefecture Location within Japan

Ichijima Station (市島駅, Ichijima-eki) is a passenger railway station located in the city of Tamba, Hyōgo Prefecture, Japan, operated by West Japan Railway Company (JR West).

== Lines ==
Ichijima Station is served by the Fukuchiyama Line, and is located 94.0 kilometers from the terminus of the line at Amagasaki.

== Station layout ==
The station consists of two opposed ground-level side platforms connected to the station building by a footbridge. The station is unattended. The station building is located along the platform serving Track 1.

=== Platforms ===
1	■ Fukuchiyama Line	for Sasayamaguchi and Sanda for Fukuchiyama
2	■ Fukuchiyama Line	for Fukuchiyama (mainly for passing by limited express trains)

== Adjacent stations ==
«	Service	»
Fukuchiyama Line
Kuroi	Local	Tamba-Takeda
Kuroi	Tambaji Rapid Service	Tamba-Takeda

== History ==
Ichijima Station opened on July 15, 1899. With the privatization of the Japan National Railways (JNR) on April 1, 1987, the station came under the aegis of the West Japan Railway Company.

== Passenger statistics ==
In fiscal 2016, the station was used by an average of 239 passengers daily.

== Surrounding area ==
- Former Ichishima Town Hall
- Tamba City Ichishima Library
- Tamba Municipal Yoshimi Elementary School
- Mitsuzuka Historic Site Park

== See also ==
- List of railway stations in Japan
