= Fukuchiyama Line =

Railway line in Japan

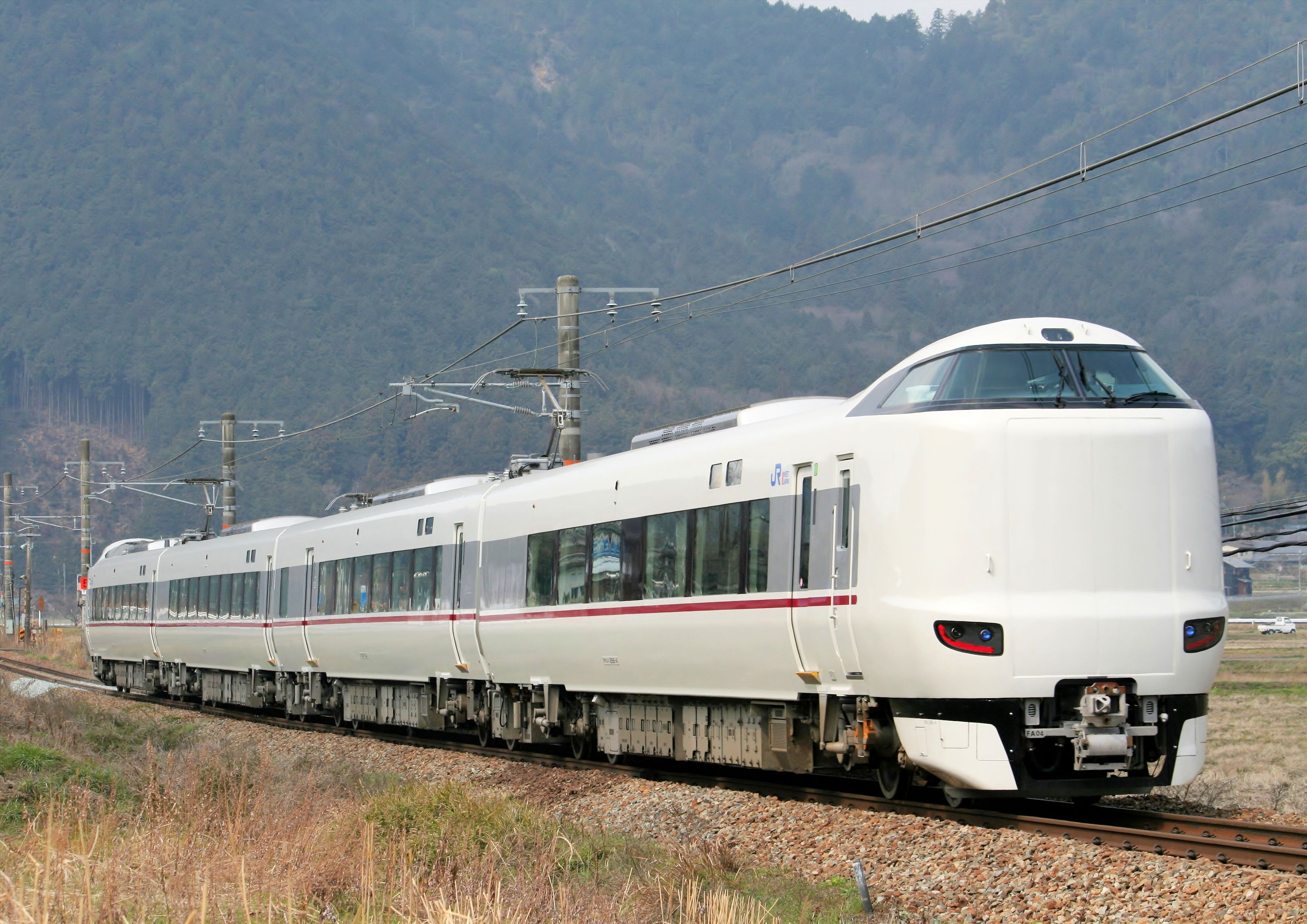
- Limited express Kounotori running on the Fukuchiyama Line

Overview
- Other name: JR Takarazuka Line (Amagasaki – Sasayamaguchi)
- Owner: JR West
- Locale: Osaka Prefecture, Hyogo Prefecture, and Kyoto Prefecture
- Termini: Amagasaki; Fukuchiyama
- Stations: 32 (23 on the JR Takarazuka Line and 2 on the Tōkaidō Main Line)

Service
- Type: Heavy rail
- System: Urban Network (Amagasaki – Sasayamaguchi)
- Rolling stock: 207 series EMU; 321 series EMU; 223-6000 series EMU; 223-5500 series EMU; 225-6000 series EMU; 287 series EMU; 289 series EMU

History
- Opened: 1891; 135 years ago

Technical
- Line length: 106.5 km (66.2 mi)
- Track gauge: 1,067 mm (3 ft 6 in)
- Electrification: 1,500 V DC, overhead line
- Operating speed: 120 km/h (75 mph)

The Fukuchiyama Line (福知山線, Fukuchiyama-sen) is a railway line operated by West Japan Railway Company (JR West) connecting Osaka and Fukuchiyama, Japan. Within JR West's "Urban Network" covering the Osaka–Kobe–Kyoto metropolitan region, the line from Osaka to Sasayamaguchi is also called the JR Takarazuka Line (JR宝塚線). The line traverses the cities of Kawanishi and Takarazuka in the northwestern corner of the Osaka metropolitan area.

Although Amagasaki is the line's official southeastern terminus, all trains continue east to Osaka and beyond on the JR Kōbe Line, or to the Gakkentoshi Line via the JR Tōzai Line.

== Basic data ==
- Operators, distances: 106.5 km / 66.2 mi.
  - West Japan Railway Company (Category-1, Services and tracks)
- Track:
  - Double-track line:
    - From Amagasaki to Sasayamaguchi
  - Single-track line:
    - From Sasayamaguchi to Fukuchiyama
- Railway signalling: Automatic
- Maximum speed:
  - From Amagasaki to Shin-Sanda: 120 km/h
  - From Shinsanda to Fukuchiyama: 105 km/h
- CTC centers:
  - From Amagasaki to Shin-Sanda: Ōsaka Operation Control Center
  - From Shinsanda to Fukuchiyama: Fukuchiyama Transportation Control Room
- CTC system:
  - From Amagasaki to Shin-Sanda: JR Takarazuka-JR Tozai-Gakkentoshisen traffic control system

== Services and stations ==
- ● : All trains stop
- ▲ : Only local through trains to and from the JR Kyoto Line stop at Tsukamoto Station.
- △ : Only rapid and regional rapid through trains to and from the JR Tozai Line return at Tsukaguchi Station in the non-rush hour.
- | : All trains pass

Local (普通): Stops at all stations, a majority of them operate through services to the JR Kyoto Line, but only these trains stop at Tsukamoto Station. The remaining services operate solely within this line.

Rapid (快速): Mainly operates between Osaka and Sasayamaguchi. Some trains operate through services to/from the JR Tozai Line via Amagasaki Station. Among these through trains, some return at Tsukaguchi Station in the non-rush hour.

Tambaji Rapid (丹波路快速): Operates between Osaka and Fukuchiyama.

Regional Rapid (区間快速): Operates between Osaka and Sasayamaguchi or between Osaka and Shin-Sanda. Also through services to/from the JR Tozai Line and the Gakkentoshi Line.

Line name		No.	Station		Distance from Amagasaki Station (km)	Local	Regional Rapid	Rapid	Tambaji Rapid	Transfers	Location	
Common	Official	No.	English	Japanese	Distance from Amagasaki Station (km)	Local	Regional Rapid	Rapid	Tambaji Rapid	Transfers	Location	
Local: Through service to JR Kyoto Line Regional Rapid, Rapid: Through service to JR Tozai Line and Gakkentoshi Line
JR Takarazuka Line	Tōkaidō Main Line	JR-G47	Osaka	大阪	7.7	●	●	●	●	Tōkaidō Main Line (JR Kyoto Line) (JR-A47), Osaka Loop Line (JR-O11), Osaka Higashi Line (JR-F01); JR Tozai Line (JR-H44: Kitashinchi Station); Hanshin Main Line (HS 01: Osaka-Umeda Station); Hankyu Kyoto Line, Takarazuka Line, Kobe Line (HK-01: Osaka-umeda Station); Osaka Metro Midosuji Line (M16: Umeda Station); Osaka Metro Tanimachi Line (T20: Higashi-Umeda Station); Osaka Metro Yotsubashi Line (Y11: Nishi-Umeda Station)	Kita-ku, Osaka	Osaka Prefecture
JR Takarazuka Line	Tōkaidō Main Line	JR-G48	Tsukamoto	塚本	4.3	▲	|	|	|		Yodogawa-ku, Osaka	Osaka Prefecture
JR Takarazuka Line	Tōkaidō Main Line	JR-G49	Amagasaki	尼崎	0.0	●	●	●	●	Tōkaidō Main Line (JR Kobe Line for Kobe) (JR-A49), JR Tōzai Line (JR-H49)	Amagasaki	Hyōgo Prefecture
JR Takarazuka Line	Fukuchiyama Line	JR-G49	Amagasaki	尼崎	0.0	●	●	●	●	Tōkaidō Main Line (JR Kobe Line for Kobe) (JR-A49), JR Tōzai Line (JR-H49)	Amagasaki	Hyōgo Prefecture
JR Takarazuka Line	Fukuchiyama Line	JR-G50	Tsukaguchi	塚口	2.5	●	△	△	|		Amagasaki	Hyōgo Prefecture
JR Takarazuka Line	Fukuchiyama Line	JR-G51	Inadera	猪名寺	3.9	●	|	|	|		Amagasaki	Hyōgo Prefecture
JR Takarazuka Line	Fukuchiyama Line	JR-G52	Itami	伊丹	5.8	●	●	●	●		Itami	Hyōgo Prefecture
JR Takarazuka Line	Fukuchiyama Line	JR-G53	Kita-Itami	北伊丹	7.9	●	|	|	|		Itami	Hyōgo Prefecture
JR Takarazuka Line	Fukuchiyama Line	JR-G54	Kawanishi-Ikeda	川西池田	11.0	●	●	●	●	Hankyu Takarazuka Line (HK-50: Kawanishi-Noseguchi Station); Nose Railway Myoken Line (NS01: Kawanishi-Noseguchi Station)	Kawanishi	Hyōgo Prefecture
JR Takarazuka Line	Fukuchiyama Line	JR-G55	Nakayamadera	中山寺	14.5	●	●	●	●		Takarazuka	Hyōgo Prefecture
JR Takarazuka Line	Fukuchiyama Line	JR-G56	Takarazuka	宝塚	17.8	●	●	●	●	Hankyu Takarazuka Line, Hankyu Imazu Line (HK-56)	Takarazuka	Hyōgo Prefecture
JR Takarazuka Line	Fukuchiyama Line	JR-G57	Namaze	生瀬	19.7	●	●	|	|		Nishinomiya	Hyōgo Prefecture
JR Takarazuka Line	Fukuchiyama Line	JR-G58	Nishinomiyanajio	西宮名塩	21.9	●	●	●	●		Nishinomiya	Hyōgo Prefecture
JR Takarazuka Line	Fukuchiyama Line	JR-G59	Takedao	武田尾	25.1	●	●	|	|		Takarazuka	Hyōgo Prefecture
JR Takarazuka Line	Fukuchiyama Line	JR-G60	Dōjō	道場	30.1	●	●	|	|		Kita-ku, Kobe	Hyōgo Prefecture
JR Takarazuka Line	Fukuchiyama Line	JR-G61	Sanda	三田	33.7	●	●	●	●	Shintetsu Sanda Line (KB29)	Sanda	Hyōgo Prefecture
JR Takarazuka Line	Fukuchiyama Line	JR-G62	Shin-Sanda	新三田	36.9	●	●	●	●		Sanda	Hyōgo Prefecture
JR Takarazuka Line	Fukuchiyama Line	JR-G63	Hirono	広野	39.7	●	●	●	●		Sanda	Hyōgo Prefecture
JR Takarazuka Line	Fukuchiyama Line	JR-G64	Aino	相野	44.0	●	●	●	●		Sanda	Hyōgo Prefecture
JR Takarazuka Line	Fukuchiyama Line	JR-G65	Aimoto	藍本	48.2	●	●	●	●		Sanda	Hyōgo Prefecture
JR Takarazuka Line	Fukuchiyama Line	JR-G66	Kusano	草野	50.2	●	●	●	●		Tamba-Sasayama	Hyōgo Prefecture
JR Takarazuka Line	Fukuchiyama Line	JR-G67	Furuichi	古市	53.5	●	●	●	●		Tamba-Sasayama	Hyōgo Prefecture
JR Takarazuka Line	Fukuchiyama Line	JR-G68	Minami-Yashiro	南矢代	56.1	●	●	●	●		Tamba-Sasayama	Hyōgo Prefecture
JR Takarazuka Line	Fukuchiyama Line	JR-G69	Sasayamaguchi	篠山口	58.4	●	●	●	●		Tamba-Sasayama	Hyōgo Prefecture
	Fukuchiyama Line		Tamba-Ōyama	丹波大山	60.7	●			●		Tamba-Sasayama	Hyōgo Prefecture
	Fukuchiyama Line		Shimotaki	下滝	68.7	●			●		Tamba	Hyōgo Prefecture
	Fukuchiyama Line		Tanikawa	谷川	73.0	●			●	Kakogawa Line	Tamba	Hyōgo Prefecture
	Fukuchiyama Line		Kaibara	柏原	80.0	●			●		Tamba	Hyōgo Prefecture
	Fukuchiyama Line		Iso	石生	83.2	●			●		Tamba	Hyōgo Prefecture
	Fukuchiyama Line		Kuroi	黒井	87.5	●			●		Tamba	Hyōgo Prefecture
	Fukuchiyama Line		Ichijima	市島	94.0	●			●		Tamba	Hyōgo Prefecture
	Fukuchiyama Line		Tamba-Takeda	丹波竹田	98.2	●			●		Tamba	Hyōgo Prefecture
	Fukuchiyama Line		Fukuchiyama	福知山	106.5	●			●	Sanin Main Line; ■F Kyoto Tango Railway Miyafuku Line (F1)	Fukuchiyama, Kyoto	

== Rolling stock ==
=== Current ===
- 207 series (Rapid and Local services, through service with Tōkaidō Main Line and Katamachi Line via JR Tōzai Line)
- 223-5500 series (Local and wanman services)
- 223-6000 series (Tanbaji and Rapid services)
- 225-6000 series (Tanbaji and Rapid services)
- 321 series (Rapid and Local services, through service with Tōkaidō Main Line and Katamachi Line via JR Tōzai Line)
- 287 series (Kounotori limited express)
- 289 series (Kounotori limited express, from 31 October 2015)

=== Former ===
- 103 series (until November 2005)
- 113 series (until March 2012)
- 115 series (until 2004)
- 117 series (until April 2005)
- 201 series (until March 2007)
- 205 series (until February 2006)
- 221 series (until March 2012)
- 415 series (Temporary)
- 183 series (Kounotori limited express, until 15 March 2013)
- 381 series (Kounotori limited express, until May 2011, from June 2012, until 30 October 2015)
- KiHa 58 series
- KiHa 65 series
- KiHa 47 series
- KiHa 80 series (Matsukaze limited express)
- KiHa 181 series (Matsukaze limited express)
- Kitakinki Tango Railway KTR 001 series (Tango Explorer limited express, until March 2011)
- Kitakinki Tango Railway KTR 8000 series (Tango Explorer limited express, until March 2007)

== History ==
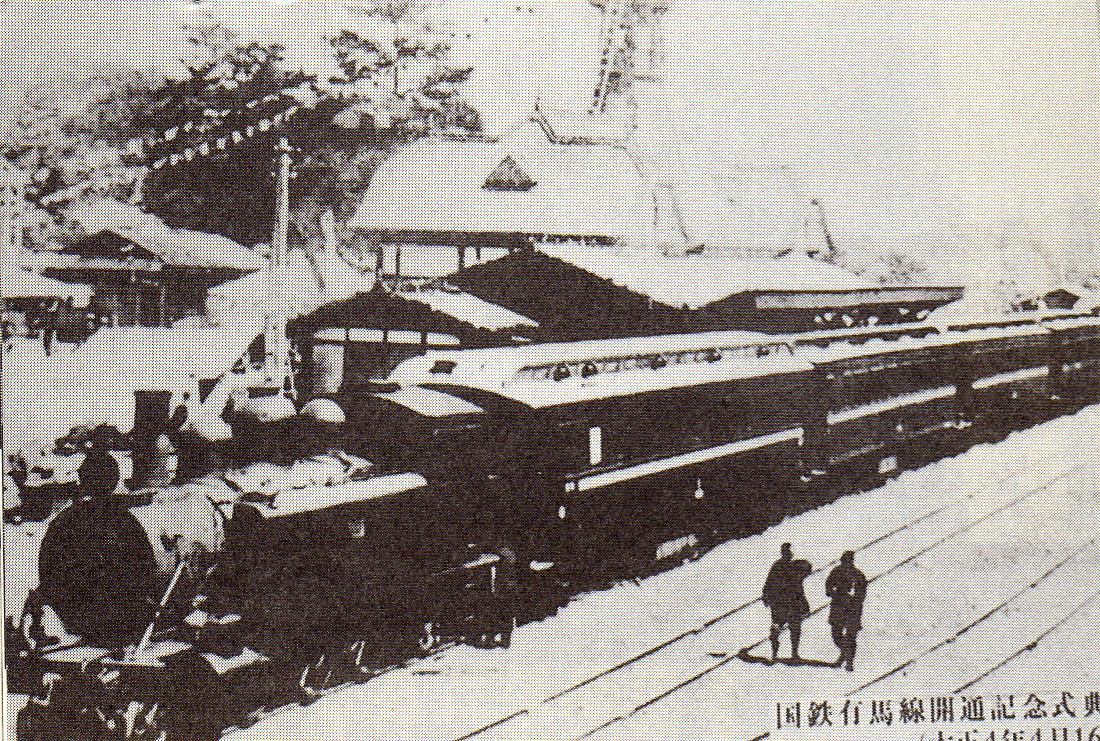
Train at Arima station

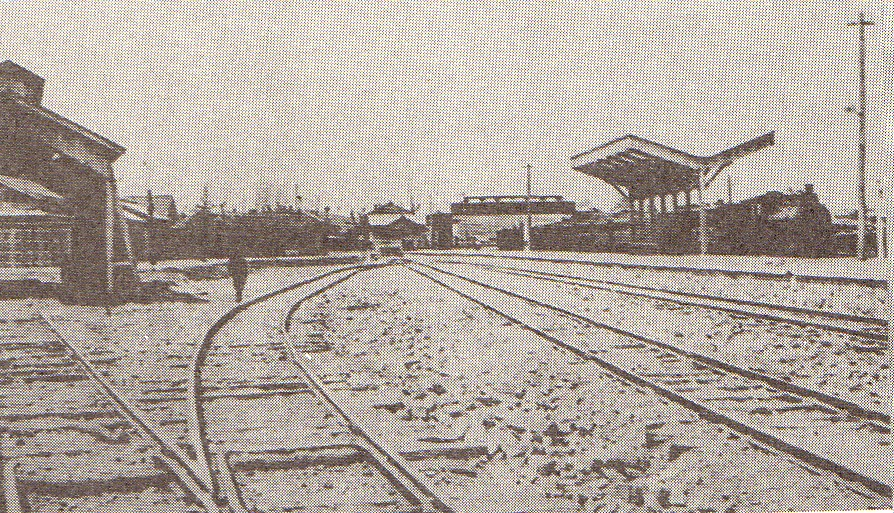
Sanda station with Arima branch on left

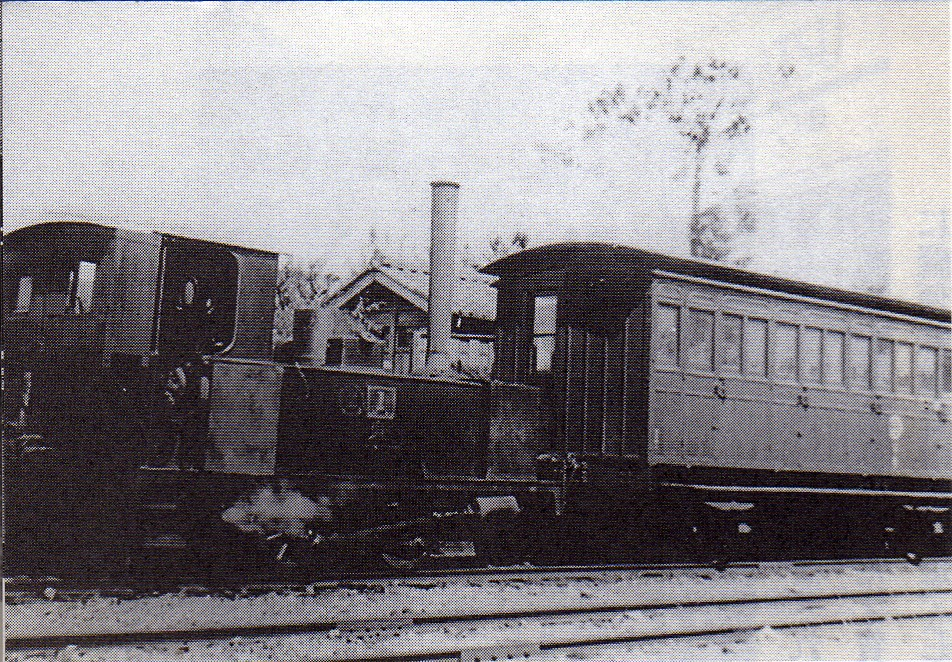
Train at Sasayama-Cho station

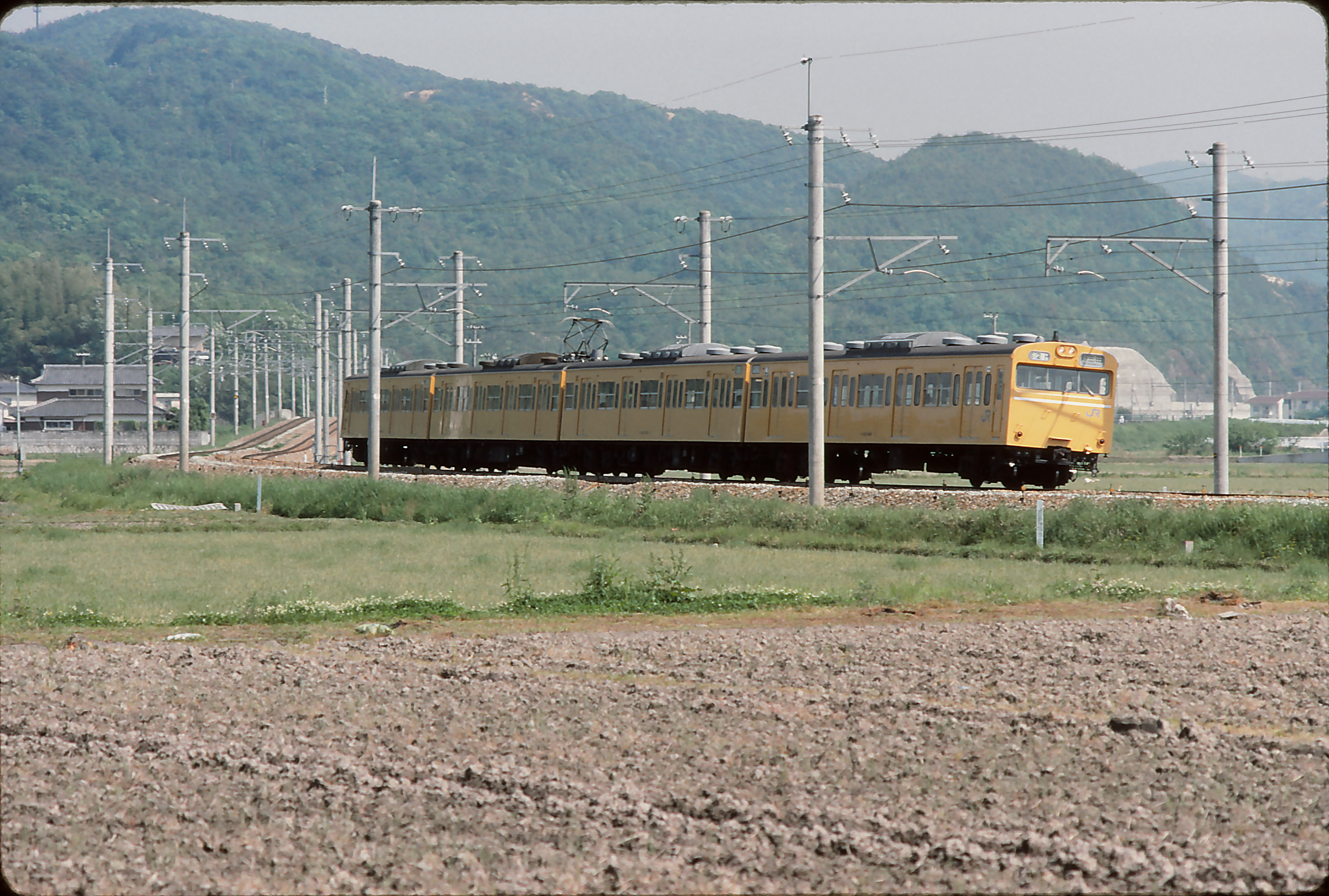
JR West (ex-JNR) 103 series train on the Fukuchiyama Line in 1991

The Japanese Government Railways (JGR) opened the Osaka – Kobe section of what is now the Tokaido Main Line in 1874 as a dual track line.

The Kawabe Horsecar Railway (川辺馬車鉄道, Kawabe Bashatetsudō) opened a 762mm gauge line between Amagasaki and Itami (about 8 km (5.0 mi)) in 1891. In 1893, the horsecar railway was reorganized as Settsu Railway (摂津鉄道, Settsu Tetsudō), which introduced steam power to the railway and extended the line to Ikeda.

The Settsu Railway was merged by Hankaku Railway (阪鶴鉄道, Hankaku Tetsudō), which had a plan to build a railway between Osaka and Maizuru. The Hankaku Railway converted the line to 1067mm gauge and extended it to Takarazuka in 1897 and to Fukuchiyama in 1899. The company also connected the line to the Kanzaki Station (present-day Amagasaki Station) of the JGR line in 1898 making the line to the original Amagasaki terminal a branch. Hankaku Railway was nationalized on August 1, 1907.

The Amagasaki – Tsukaguchi section was duplicated in 1934, and extended to Takarazuka in 1979/80. The Takarazuka – Shin-Sanda section was duplicated in 1986 in conjunction with the opening of the 2,970 m (9,744 ft) Najio tunnel and associated deviation, which shortened the route by 1.8 km (1.1 mi). Duplication to Sasayamaguchi was completed in 1996.

The Amagasaki – Tsukaguchi section was electrified in 1956, and extended to Takarazuka in 1981. The remainder of the line was electrified in 1986.

CTC signalling was commissioned between Fukuchiyama and Sasayamaguchi in 1982, extended to Hirono in 1984 and to Amagasaki in 1986.

The branchline between Amagasakikō Station (former Amagasaki terminal of the horsecar railway) and Tsukaguchi Station ceased passenger operation in 1981 and freight operation in 1984.

=== Former connecting lines ===
- Sanda station – The Arima Line, a 12 km line to Arima operated from 1915 to 1943.
- Sasayama-guchi station – The Sasayama Railway, a 5 km (3.1 mi) line to Sasayama-Chō opened in 1915. The private railway was discontinued in 1944 when the Sasayama Line of the Japanese Government Railways opened. The Sasayama Line closed in 1972.
- Fukuchiyama station – The Hokutan Railway Co. operated a 12 km line to Koumori between 1923 and 1971.

=== Accidents ===
On April 25, 2005, a seven-car 207 series train on a Rapid service derailed and crashed into a building between Tsukaguchi and Amagasaki on its way for Doshisha-mae via the JR Tōzai Line and the Katamachi Line. 107 passengers were killed in the accident. Operations on the affected part of the line remained suspended until trial runs began on June 7, 2005. Passenger service resumed on June 19, 2005.

The train involved was train number 5418M, a limited-stop "Rapid" commuter service from Takarazuka to Dōshisha-mae. It was a seven-car 207 series electric multiple unit (EMU) formation consisting of a 4-car set and a 3-car set coupled together. The train was carrying approximately 580 passengers at the time of the accident.
