= Kounotori =

Kounotori may refer to:

- The Japanese name for the Oriental stork
- Kounotori (spacecraft), an uncrewed cargo spacecraft, including a list of vehicles that share the name
- Kounotori (train), a train service in Japan
