= Namaze Station =

Railway station in Nishinomiya, Hyōgo Prefecture, Japan

Namaze Station 生瀬駅
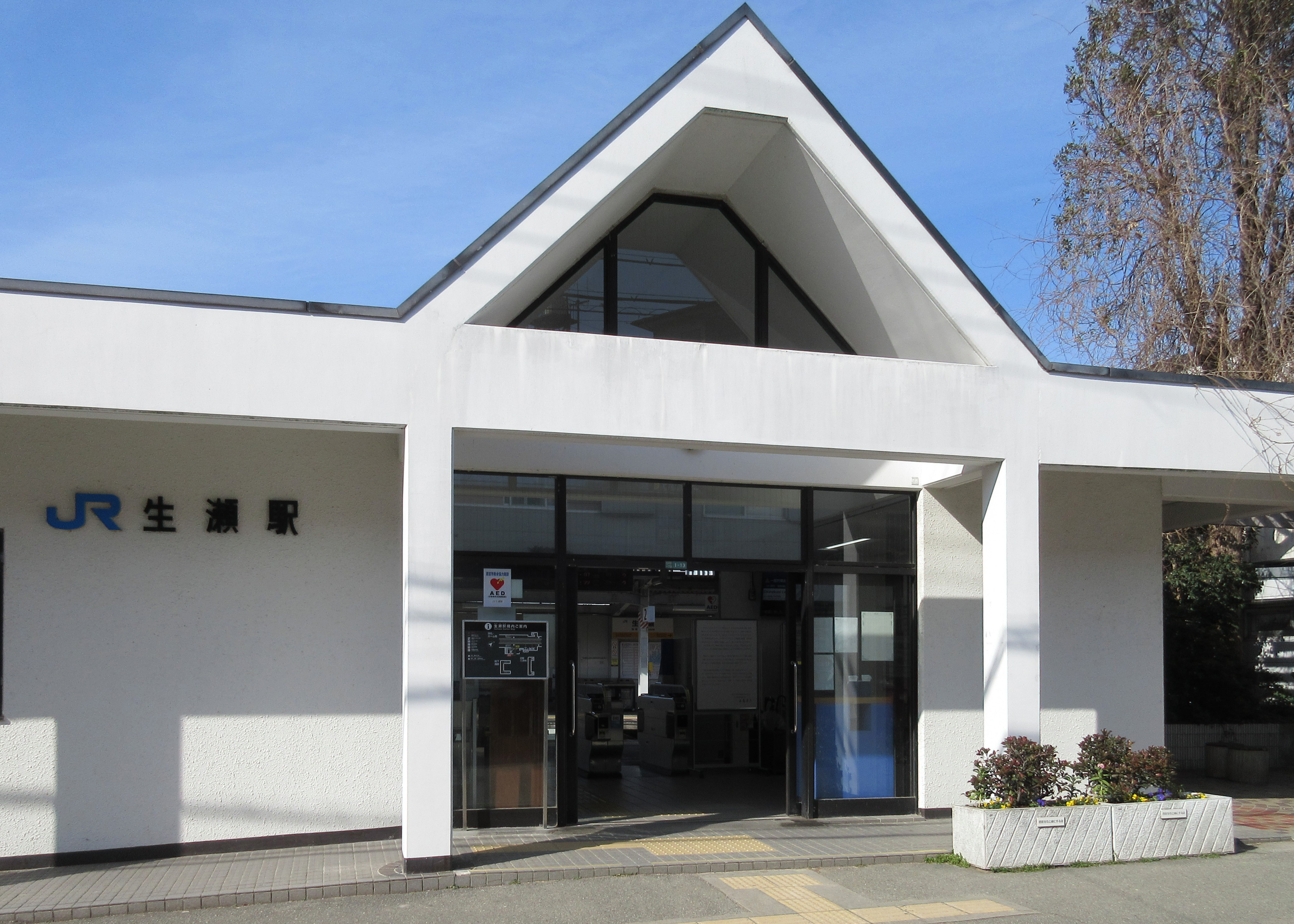
- Namaze Station in February 2018

General information
- Location: 1-1-13 Namaze-cho, Nishinomiya-shi, Hyogo-ken 669-1102; Japan
- Coordinates: 34.8194°N 135.3251°E
- Operator: JR West
- Line: G Fukuchiyama Line
- Distance: 19.7 km from Amagasaki
- Platforms: 2 side platforms
- Tracks: 2

Construction
- Structure type: Ground level
- Accessible: Yes

Other information
- Station code: JR-G57
- Website: Official website

History
- Opened: 8 June 1898
- Former names: Arimaguchi (until March 1899)

Passengers
- FY2016: 1867 daily
Location
- Location within Hyōgo Prefecture Location within Japan

Namaze Station (生瀬駅, Namaze-eki) is a passenger railway station located in the city of Nishinomiya, Hyōgo Prefecture, Japan. It is operated by the West Japan Railway Company (JR West).

== Lines ==
Namaze Station is served by the Fukuchiyama Line (part of the JR Takarazuka Line), and is located 19.7 km from the starting point of the line at Amagasaki and 27.4 kilometers from Ōsaka Station.

== Station layout ==
The station has two side platforms serving two tracks, connected to the one-story concrete station building by an underground passage. The station has a "Midori no Madoguchi" staffed ticket office.

=== Platforms ===
1	■ Fukuchiyama Line	for Fukuchiyama
2	■ Fukuchiyama Line	for Amagasaki and Osaka

== Adjacent stations ==
«	Service	»
Fukuchiyama Line (JR Takarazuka Line)
Takarazuka	Local	Nishinomiyanajio
Takarazuka	Regional Rapid Service	Nishinomiyanajio
Rapid Service: Does not stop at this station
Tambaji Rapid Service: Does not stop at this station

== History ==
The station opened on 8 June 1898, originally named Arimaguchi Station (有馬口駅). It was renamed Namaze Station on 25 March 1899. With the privatization of Japanese National Railways (JNR) on 1 April 1987, the station came under the control of JR West.

Station numbering was introduced in March 2018 with Namaze being assigned station number JR-G57.

== Passenger statistics ==
In fiscal 2016, the station was used by an average of 1867 passengers daily.

== Surrounding area ==
- National Route 176
- Hokusetsu Central Hospital

== See also ==
- List of railway stations in Japan
