= Dōjō Station =

Railway station in Sanda, Hyōgo Prefecture, Japan

Dōjō Station 道場駅
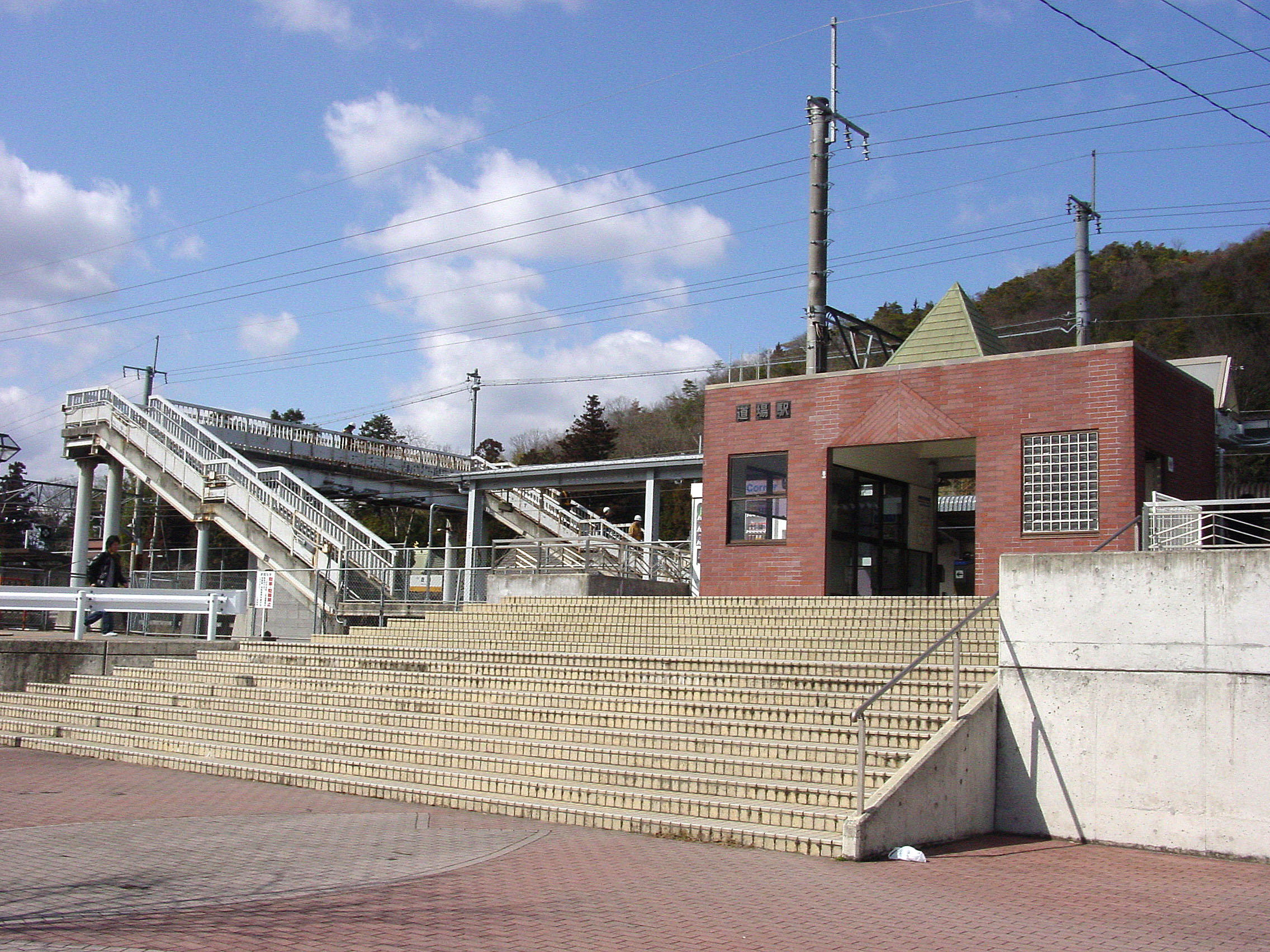
- Dōjō Station in February 2008

General information
- Location: 70 Ikuno Dōjō, Sanda-shi, Hyōgo-ken 651-1503; Japan
- Coordinates: 34°52′2.02″N 135°15′20.26″E
- Owner: West Japan Railway Company
- Operator: West Japan Railway Company
- Lines: Fukuchiyama Line (JR Takarazuka Line)
- Distance: 30.1 km (18.7 miles) from Amagasaki
- Platforms: 2 side platforms
- Connections: Bus stop

Construction
- Structure type: Ground level
- Accessible: None

Other information
- Status: Unstaffed
- Station code: JR-G60
- Website: Official website

History
- Opened: 25 January 1899

Passengers
- FY2016: 998 daily
Location
- Location within Hyōgo Prefecture Location within Japan

Dōjō Station (道場駅, Dōjō-eki) is a passenger railway station located in the city of Kobe, Hyōgo Prefecture, Japan. It is operated by the West Japan Railway Company (JR West).

== Lines ==
Dōjō Station is served by the Fukuchiyama Line (JR Takarazuka Line), and is located 30.1 kilometers from the terminus of the line at Amagasaki and 37.8 kilometers from Osaka.

== Station layout ==
The station consists of two opposed ground-level side platforms. The station building is located on the south side of Platform 1, and is connected to Platform 2 on the opposite side by a footbridge without a roof. There are no elevators or other equipment installed on the overpass, making it difficult for wheelchair users to reach Platform 2. The station is unattended

=== Platforms ===
1	■ Fukuchiyama Line (JR Takarazuka Line)	for Sanda and Sasayamaguchi
2	■ Fukuchiyama Line (JR Takarazuka Line)	for Takarazuka and Fukuchiyama

== Adjacent stations ==
«	Service	»
Fukuchiyama Line (JR Takarazuka Line)
Takedao	Local	Sanda
Takedao	Regional Rapid Service	Sanda
Rapid Service: Does not stop at this station
Tambaji Rapid Service: Does not stop at this station

== History ==
Dōjō Station opened on 25 January 1899, as a station of Hankaku Railway, which was nationalized in 1907. With the privatization of the Japan National Railways (JNR) on 1 April 1987, the station came under the aegis of the West Japan Railway Company.

Station numbering was introduced in March 2018 with Dojo being assigned station number JR-G60.

== Passenger statistics ==
In fiscal 2016, the station was used by an average of 998 passengers daily

== Surrounding area ==
- Fuji Titanium Industry Kobe Factory
- Senkari Dam

== See also ==
- List of railway stations in Japan
