= Kounotori (train) =

Japanese limited express train service

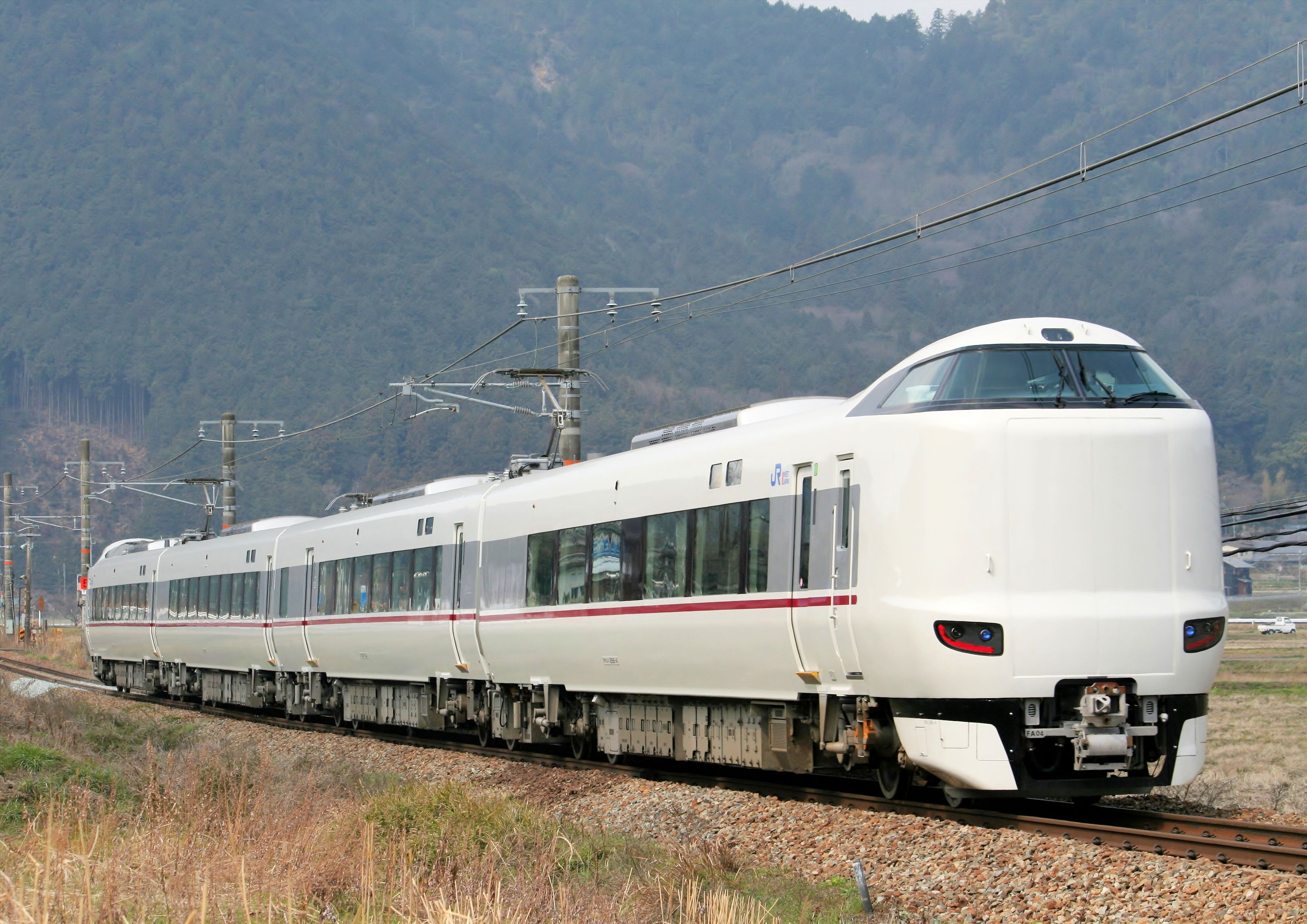
- 287 series on a Kounotori service, March 2011

Overview
- Service type: Limited express
- Locale: Tokaido Main Line, Fukuchiyama Line, Sanin Main Line
- First service: 12 March 2011
- Current operator(s): JR West

Route
- Termini: Shin-Ōsaka; Kinosaki Onsen

Technical
- Rolling stock: 287 series/289 series EMUs
- Track gauge: 1,067 mm (3 ft 6 in)
- Electrification: 1,500 V DC overhead

The Kounotori (こうのとり, Kōnotori) is a limited express train service operated by the West Japan Railway Company (JR West) between Shin-Ōsaka and Kinosaki Onsen in Japan since 12 March 2011. It replaced the previous Kitakinki services.

The name means "stork", and was chosen because the stork is the prefectural bird of Hyōgo, and the city of Toyooka in particular has close involvement with stork breeding programmes.

== Service pattern and station stops ==
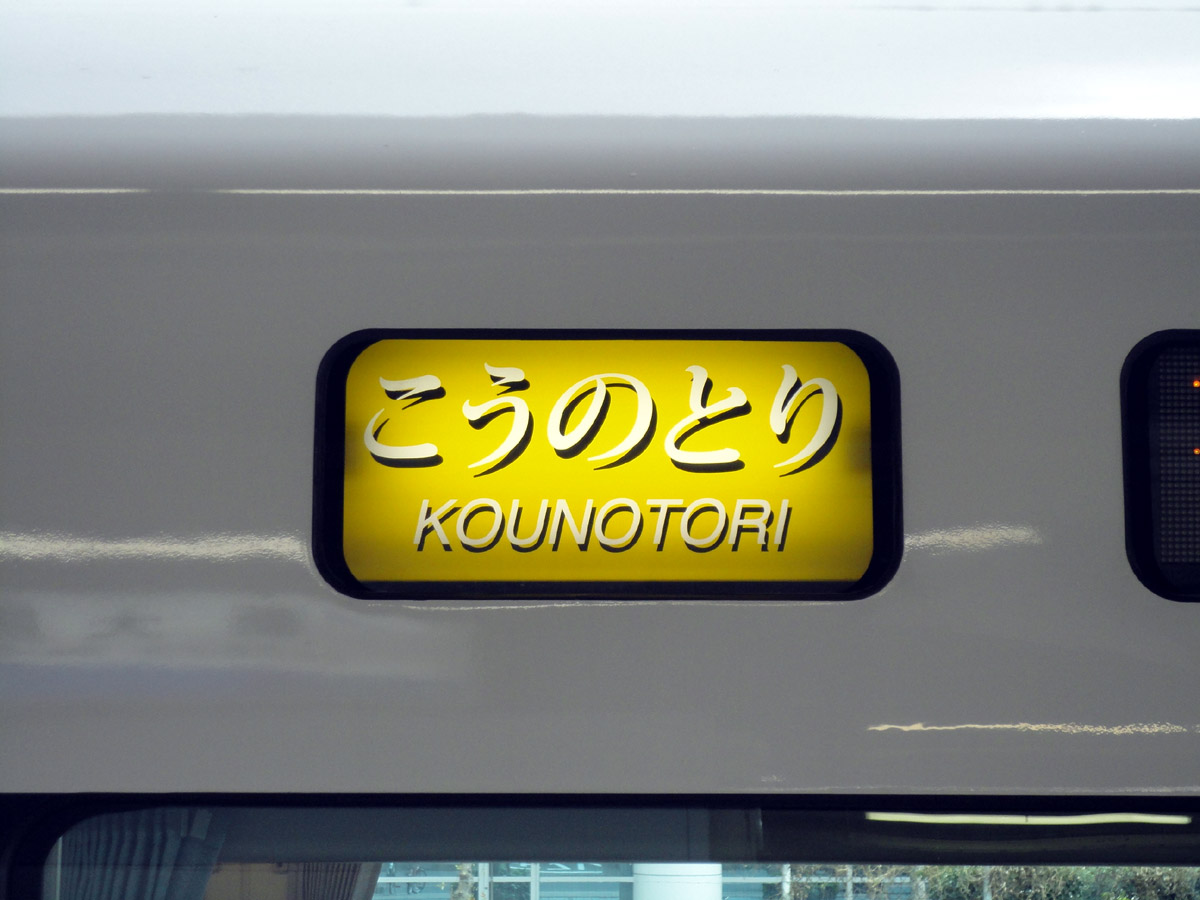
Train name indicator on the side of a 287 series EMU

14 down services (Kounotori 1–27) from Shin-Osaka and 13 up services (Kounotori 2–26) to Shin-Osaka run daily, with the journey time from Shin-Osaka to Kinosaki Onsen taking approximately 2 hours 45 minutes.

Kounotori services stop at the following stations. (Stations in parentheses are not served by all trains.)

Shin-Ōsaka - Ōsaka - Amagasaki - Takarazuka - Sanda - (Shin-Sanda) - (Aino) - Sasayamaguchi - (Tanikawa) - Kaibara - (Kuroi) - Fukuchiyama - (Wadayama) - (Yōka) - (Ebara) - (Toyooka) - (Kinosaki Onsen)

Kounotori, Kinosaki, Hashidate, Maizuru, and Hamakaze constitute the Kitakinki Big X Network of limited express services connecting the northern Kinki/Kansai (Kitakinki) region with the Keihanshin metropolitan area.

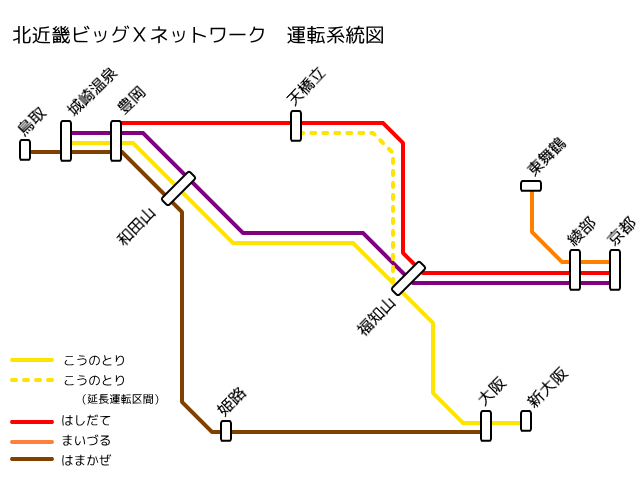
Kounotori (yellow), Kinosaki (purple), Hashidate (red), Maizuru (orange), and Hamakaze (brown) constitute the "Kitakinki Big-X Network" since 12 March 2011

== Rolling stock ==
The following rolling stock is used on Kounotori services.

- 287 series EMUs (since 12 March 2011)
- 289 series EMUs (from 31 October 2015)

289 series EMUs converted from former dual-voltage 683 series trainsets were introduced on Kounotori services from 31 October 2015, replacing the remaining JNR-era 381 series trains.

=== Former rolling stock ===
- 183 series 4/6-car EMUs (12 March 2011 – 15 March 2013)
- 381 series 4/6-car EMUs (from 12 March 2011 to 31 May 2011, and from 1 June 2012 to 30 October 2015)
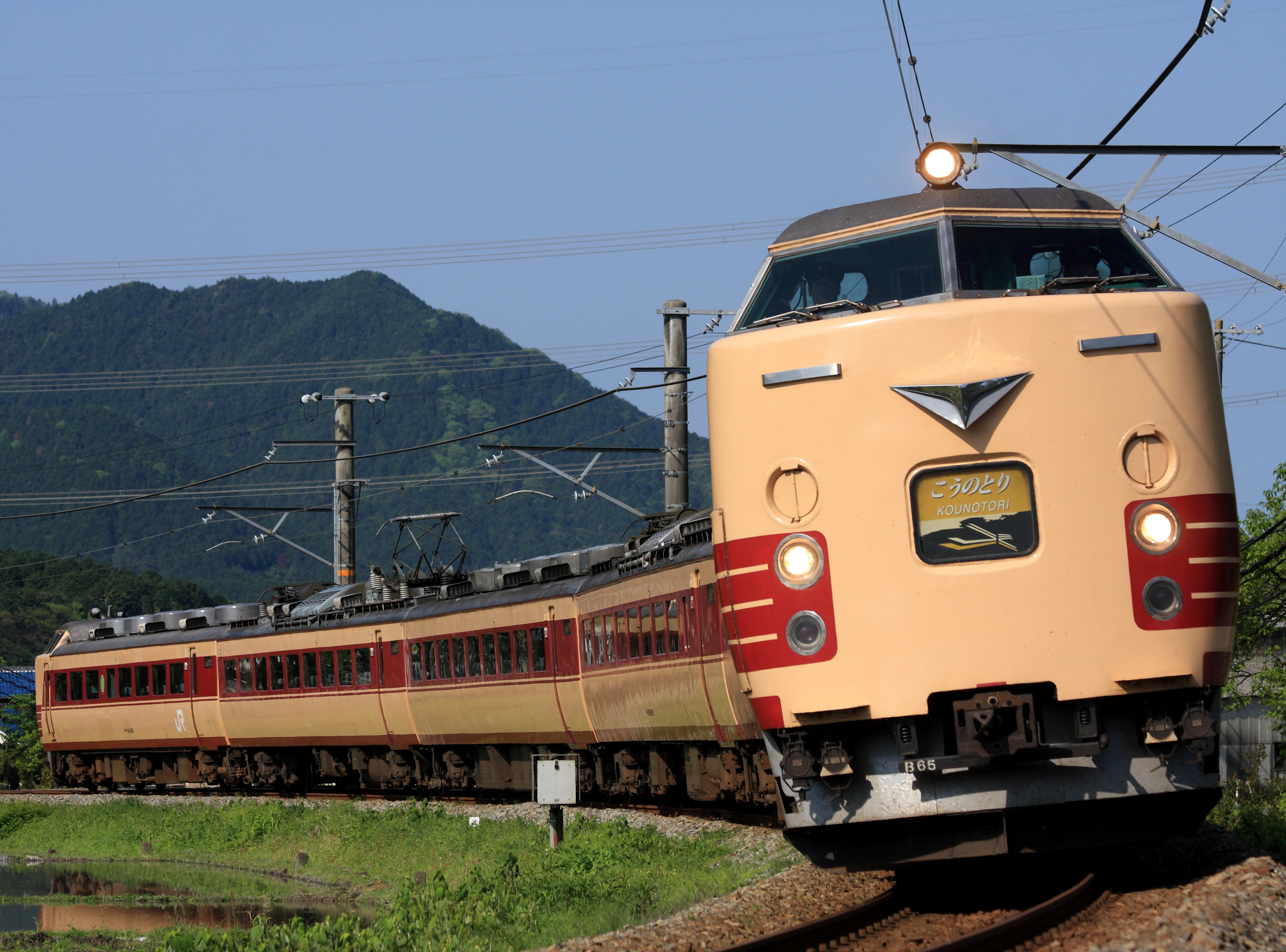
183 series 6-car set, April 2012

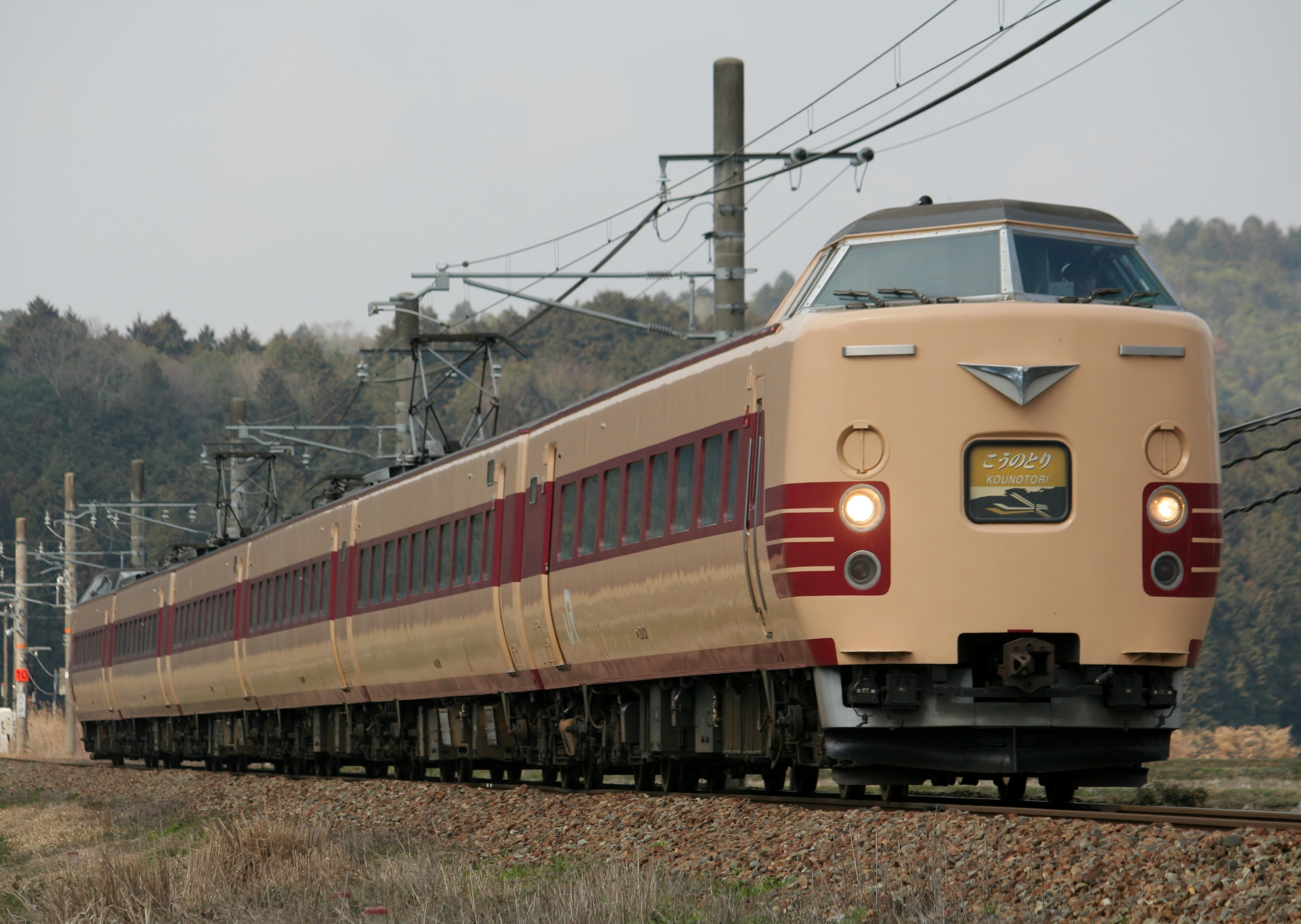
381 series 6-car set, March 2011

== See also ==
- List of named passenger trains of Japan
