= Rakuraku Harima =

Japanese commuter limited express service

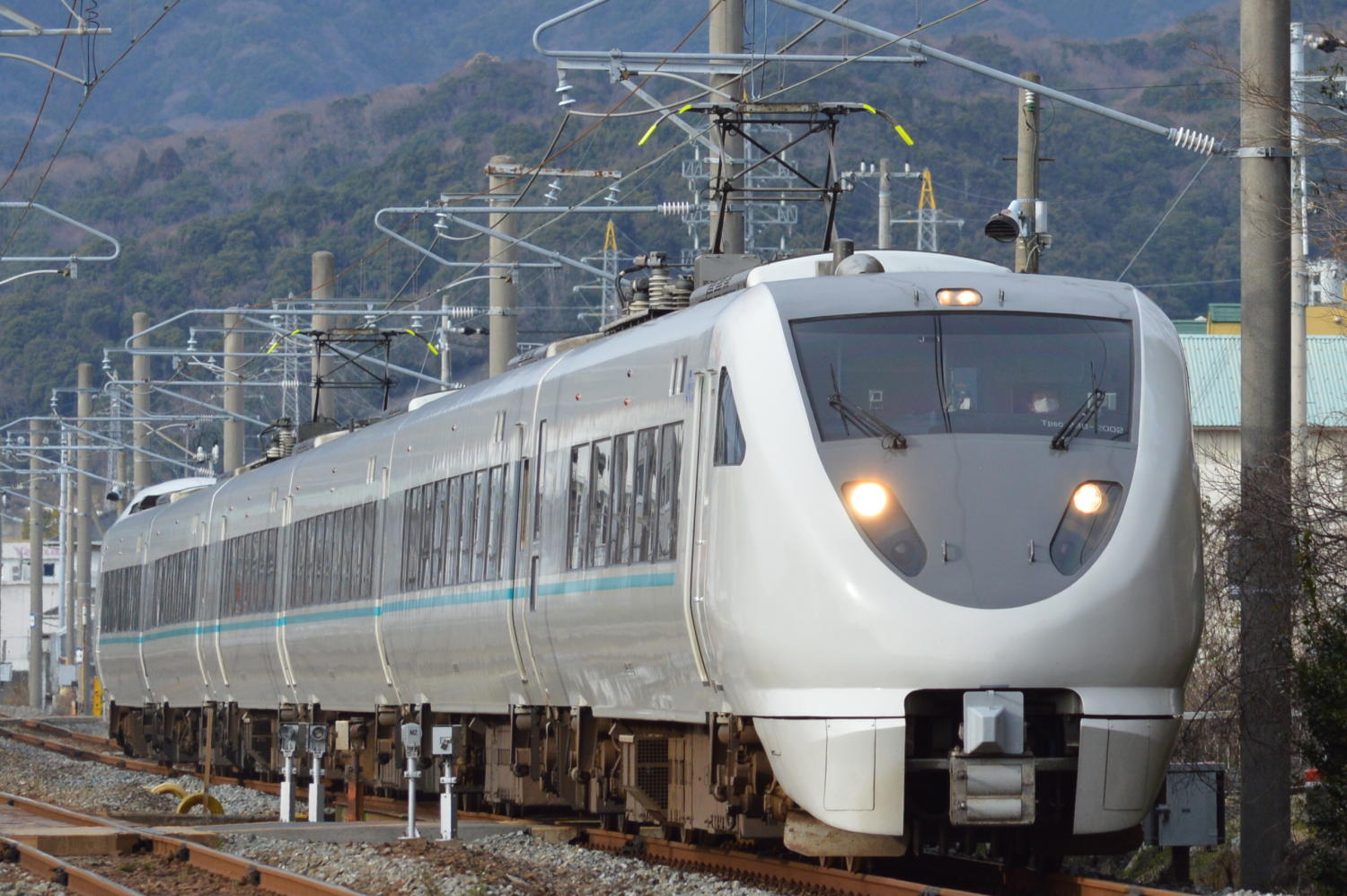
- Rakuraku Harima's rolling stock, the 289 series

Overview
- Service type: Commuter Limited Express
- Status: In service
- Locale: Kyoto , Osaka and Hyogo, Japan
- First service: 18 March 2019
- Current operator: JR West

Route
- Termini: Kyoto; Aboshi
- Distance travelled: 141.0 km (87.6 mi)
- Lines used: JR Kyoto Line, JR Kobe Line (Tōkaidō Main Line, San'yō Main Line)

On-board services
- Classes: Standard class, Green Car
- Seating arrangements: Transverse
- Other facilities: Sockets available for certain seats

Technical
- Rolling stock: 289 series EMUs
- Track gauge: 1,067 mm (3 ft 6 in)
- Electrification: 1,500 V DC overhead

The Rakuraku Harima (らくラクはりま) is a Commuter Limited Express train operated by West Japan Railway Company (JR West) between Kyoto Station and Aboshi Station, on the JR Kyoto Line, JR Kobe Line (Tōkaidō Main Line, San'yō Main Line).

== Summary ==
This Commuter Limited Express train operates during weekday mornings and evenings. With the introduction of this train, Limited Express trains between 6pm and 8pm from Osaka to Himeji now operate at 1 hour intervals. The total travel time of the Rakuraku Harima is about an hour, which is 5 to 10 minutes faster than a Special Rapid train. J-WEST Card holders can enjoy a discount on the Limited Express charge with the "J-WEST Ticketless" service.

As a Limited Express train, it is similar to the Rakuraku Biwako and the Haruka, that they all operate within JR West's "Urban Network" metropolitan area. It is also the first Limited Express train to be introduced to the Kinki Region in 16 years, ever since the debut of the Biwako Express in 2003.

== Service pattern ==
The train operates only on weekdays. One eastbound train from Aboshi to Kyoto is operated in the morning rush hours, and one westbound train from Kyoto to Aboshi is operated in the evening rush hours.

=== Stations served ===
Kyoto ー Shin-Osaka ー Osaka ー Sannomiya ー Kōbe ー Akashi ー Nishi-Akashi ー Ōkubo ー Kakogawa ー Himeji ー Agaho ー Harima-Katsuhara ー Aboshi

- The Hamakaze No. 5 and the Super Hakuto No. 13,15, which run ahead and behind the evening Rakuraku Harima respectively, now adapt the same stopping pattern as the Rakuraku Harima.

== Rolling stock ==
- 289 series 6-car sets (based in the Suita Depot).
- Car 1 is at the Aboshi-end, while Car 6 is at the Kyoto-end.
- Sockets are located at the front and rear end of each car, and all seats in the green car.

・No. 3, 2

Car No.	1		2	3	4	5	6
Accommodation	Green	Reserved	Reserved	Reserved	Reserved	Reserved	Reserved
Note					Barrier-Free	Women only	

・No. 1, 4

Car No.	1	2	3	4	5	6
Accommodation	Reserved	Reserved	Reserved	Reserved	Reserved	Reserved
Note					Barrier-Free, Women only	

== History ==
- 30 November 2018: Officially announces that services will begin in Spring 2019, along with daily operation frequency, stations served, rolling stock and limited express charge
- 14 December 2018: Officially announces date of first service and its timetables
- 18 March 2019: Operation commences
