= Tsukamoto Station =

Railway station in Osaka, Japan

Coordinates: 34°42′45.29″N 135°28′7.96″E

Tsukamoto 塚本
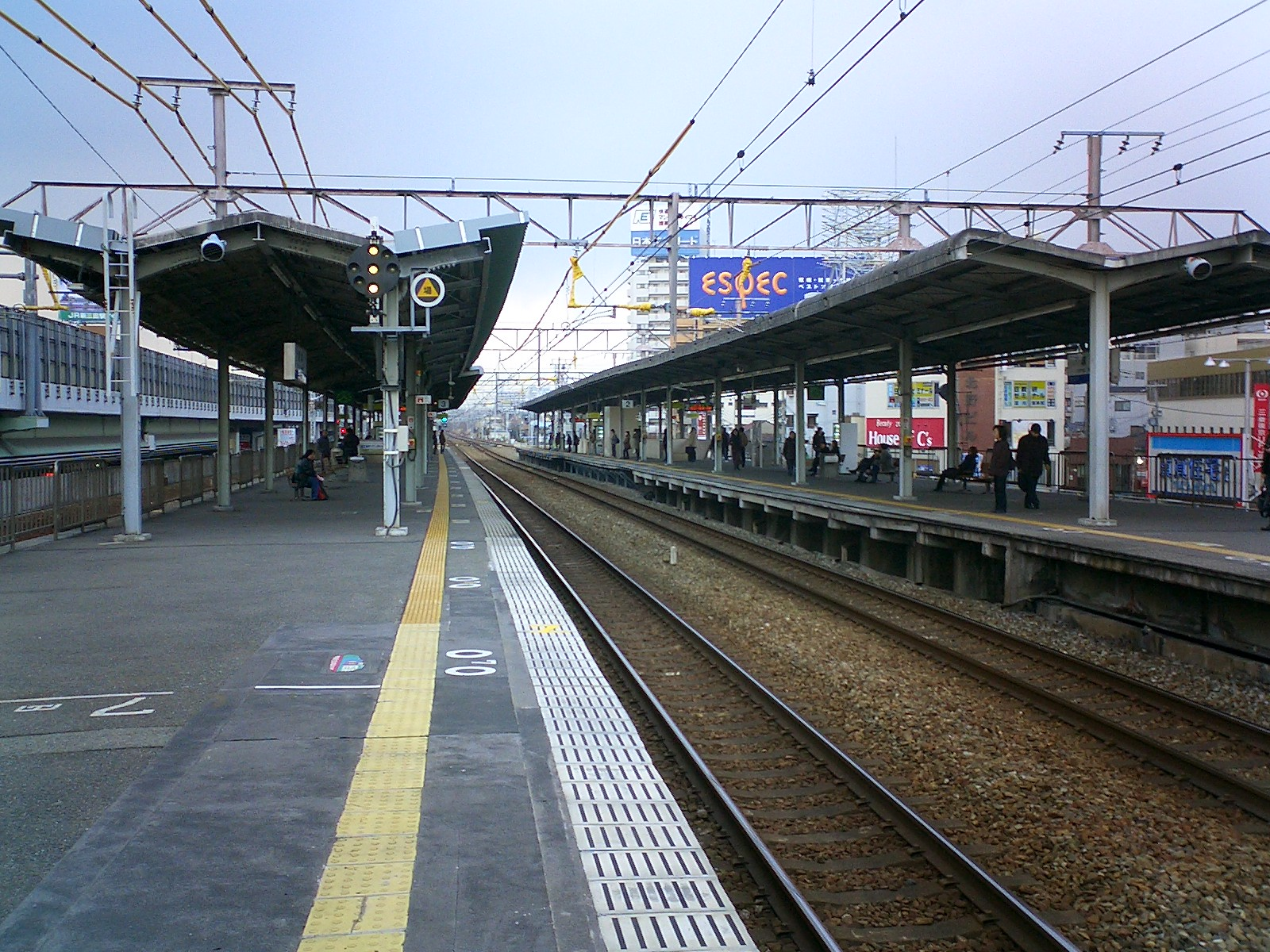
- Platforms

General information
- Lines: JR Kobe Line; JR Fukuchiyama Line
- Platforms: 2 Side platforms
- Tracks: 4

Construction
- Structure type: Elevated
- Accessible: Yes

Other information
- Station code: JR-A48 (Kobe Line); JR-G48 (Fukuchiyama Line)

Passengers
- FY 2023: 37,448 daily
Location

Tsukamoto Station (塚本駅, Tsukamoto-eki) is a train station on the Tōkaidō Line in Tsukamoto Nichome, Yodogawa-ku, Osaka, Osaka Prefecture, Japan.

== Line ==
- West Japan Railway Company (JR West)
  - Tōkaidō Line (JR Kobe Line, JR Takarazuka Line)

== Facilities ==
This station has two elevated island platforms with four tracks. Tracks 1 and 4 are fenced as all trains running on the outer tracks pass through this station without stopping.

| 1 | ■ Passing trains only | |
| 2 | ■ JR Kyōto Line | for Osaka, Shin-Ōsaka, Takatsuki and Kyōto |
| 3 | ■ JR Kōbe Line | for Sannomiya and Himeji / (JR Takarazuka Line) for Takarazuka |
| 4 | ■ Passing trains only | |

- This station is an intermediate station on the "JR Kobe Line". However, the only direction for Sannomiya and Takarazuka is informed as the "JR Kobe Line" and the opposite direction (for Osaka and Kyoto) as the "JR Kyoto Line".
- Rapid services and some Fukuchiyama Line local trains originating and terminating at Osaka pass the following tracks of this station.
  - Outer tracks - special rapid services, JR Takarazuka Line rapid services, JR Kobe Line rapid services (in the morning), Fukuchiyama Line local trains originating and terminating at Osaka
  - Inner tracks - JR Kobe Line rapid services (except above)

=== Wye ===
A wye is located in the north of Tsukamoto Station, connecting to Miyahara Depot on the Hoppo Freight Line. The wye is treated as a part of the facilities of this station.

On the eastbound tracks, the first entering signal is located at the branch of the Hoppo Freight Line, the second is in the wye, the third is at the junction of the track from Miyahara, then the fourth is in the north of the platform for Osaka and Shin-Osaka. The departure signal is located in the south of the platform.

On the westbound tracks, the signal in the south of the platform for Amagasaki is not the entering signal but block signal 0. The entering signal is located in the north of the platform and the track branches off to Miyahara, then after passing several block signals in the wye, the departure signal is at the junction of the Hoppo Freight Line.

== Adjacent stations ==
| « | Service | » |
West Japan Railway Company (JR West)
Tōkaidō Line (JR Kobe Line)
| Osaka (JR-A47) | Local trains | Amagasaki (JR-A49) |
Rapid Service: Does not stop at this station
Special Rapid Service: Does not stop at this station
through to and from the Fukuchiyama Line (JR Takarazuka Line)
| Osaka (JR-A47) | Local trains (through to and from the JR Kyoto Line) | Amagasaki (JR-G49) |
Local trains (originating from and terminating at Osaka): Does not stop at this station
Regional Rapid Service: Does not stop at this station
Rapid Service: Does not stop at this station
Tambaji Rapid Service: Does not stop at this station

== History ==
Station numbering was introduced in March 2018 with Tsukamoto being assigned station number JR-A48 for the JR Kobe Line and JR-G48 for the Fukuchiyama Line.
