= Isō Station =

Railway station in Tamba, Hyōgo Prefecture, Japan

Isō Station 石生駅
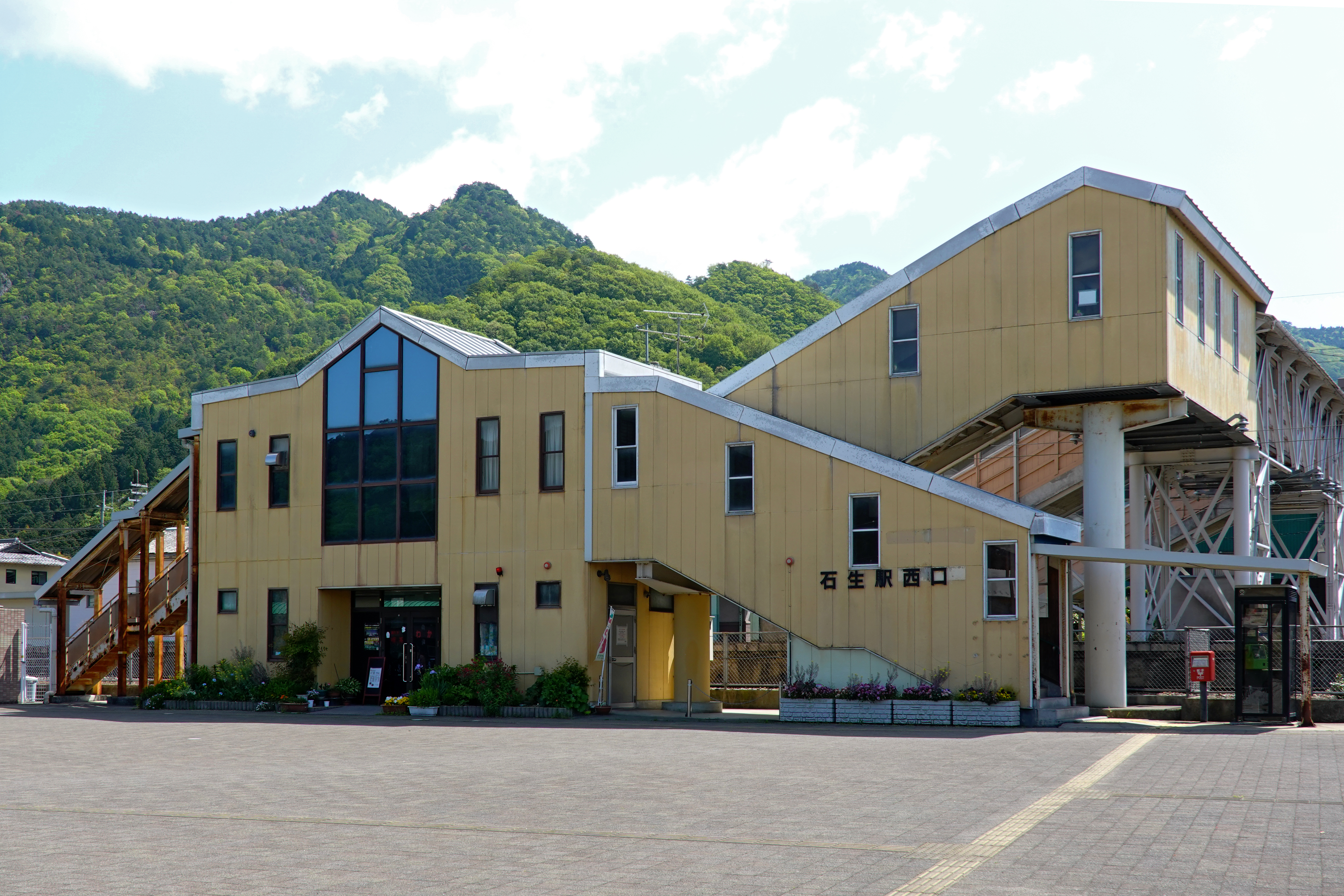
- Isō Station in May 2023

General information
- Location: Hikamicho Isō, Tamba-shi, Hyōgo-ken 669-3464; Japan
- Coordinates: 35.1527°N 135.0637°E
- Owner: West Japan Railway Company
- Operator: West Japan Railway Company
- Line: Fukuchiyama Line
- Distance: 83.2 km (51.7 miles) from Amagasaki
- Platforms: 1 side + 1 island platforms
- Connections: Bus stop

Other information
- Status: Unstaffed
- Website: Official website

History
- Opened: 15 July 1899

Passengers
- FY2016: 355 daily
Location
- Location within Hyōgo Prefecture Location within Japan

Isō Station (石生駅, Isō-eki) is a passenger railway station located in the city of Tamba, Hyōgo Prefecture, Japan, operated by West Japan Railway Company (JR West).

== Lines ==
Isō Station is served by the Fukuchiyama Line, and is located 83.2 kilometers from the terminus of the line at Amagasaki.

== Station layout ==
The station consists of one ground-level side platform and one ground-level island platform connected to the station building by a footbridge. The station is unattended.

=== Platforms ===
1	■ Fukuchiyama Line	for Sasayamaguchi and Sanda
2, 3	■ Fukuchiyama Line	for Fukuchiyama

== Adjacent stations ==
«	Service	»
Fukuchiyama Line
Kaibara	Local	Kuroi
Kaibara	Tambaji Rapid Service	Kuroi

== History ==
Isō Station opened on July 15, 1899. With the privatization of the Japan National Railways (JNR) on April 1, 1987, the station came under the aegis of the West Japan Railway Company.

== Passenger statistics ==
In fiscal 2016, the station was used by an average of 355 passengers daily

== Surrounding area ==
- Tanba Municipal East Elementary School
- Miwakare Park-The lowest watershed in Japan
- Tamba City Hikamikairomiwaka Moisture Field Museum

== See also ==
- List of railway stations in Japan
