= Kaibara Station =

Railway station in Tamba, Hyōgo Prefecture, Japan

Kaibara Station 柏原駅
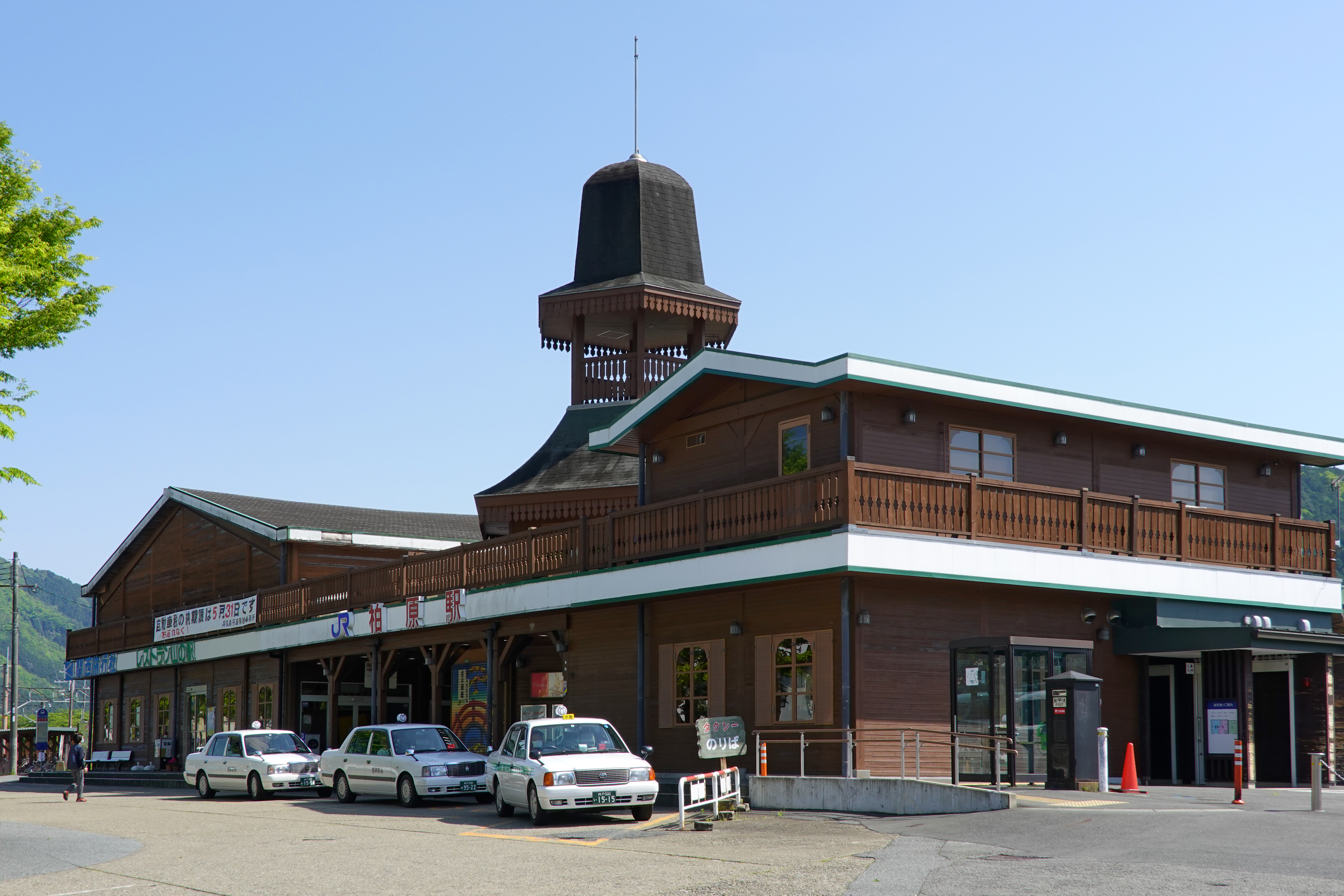
- Kaibara Station building, May 2023

General information
- Location: Kaibaracho Kaibara, Tamba-shi, Hyōgo-ken 669-3309; Japan
- Coordinates: 35°07′38″N 135°04′38″E
- Owner: West Japan Railway Company
- Operator: West Japan Railway Company
- Line: Fukuchiyama Line
- Distance: 80.0 km (49.7 miles) from Amagasaki
- Platforms: 2 side platforms
- Connections: Bus stop

Other information
- Status: Unstaffed
- Website: Official website

History
- Opened: 25 May 1899

Passengers
- FY2016: 816 daily
Location
- Location within Hyōgo Prefecture Location within Japan

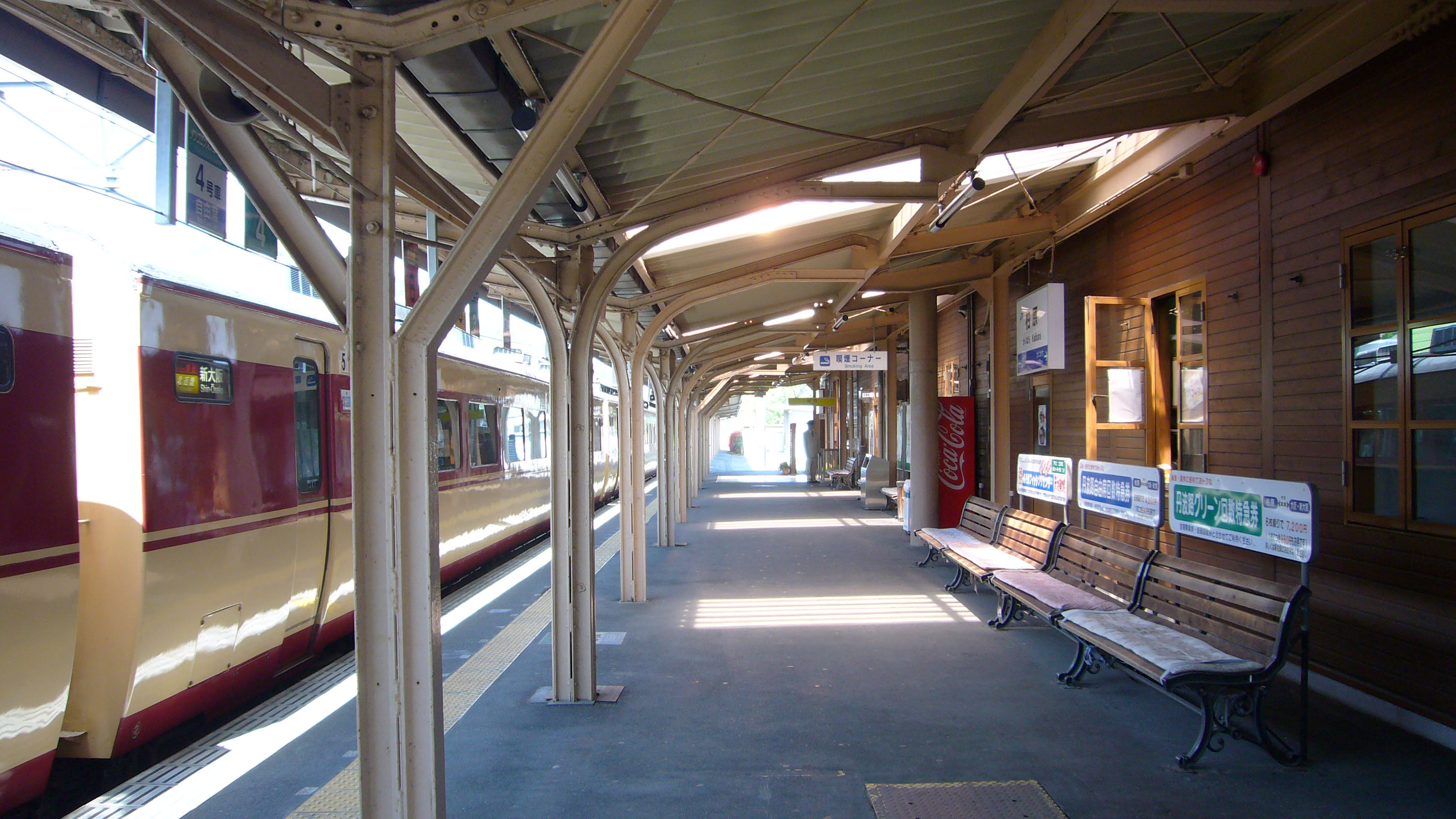
Kaibara Station platform

Kaibara Station (柏原駅, Kaibara-eki) is a passenger railway station located in the city of Tamba, Hyōgo Prefecture, Japan, operated by West Japan Railway Company (JR West).

== Lines ==
Kaibara Station is served by the Fukuchiyama Line, and is located 80.0 kilometers from the terminus of the line at Amagasaki.

== Station layout ==
The station consists of two opposed ground-level side platforms connected to the station building by a footbridge. The station is unattended.

=== Platforms ===
1	■ Fukuchiyama Line	for Sasayamaguchi and Sanda for Fukuchiyama
2	■ Fukuchiyama Line	for Fukuchiyama (used mainly for passing express trains

== Adjacent stations ==
«	Service	»
Fukuchiyama Line
Tanikawa	Local	Iso
Tanikawa	Tambaji Rapid Service	Iso
Sasayamaguchi	Limited Express "Konotori"	Fukuchiyama

== History ==
Kaibara Station opened on May 25, 1899. With the privatization of the Japan National Railways (JNR) on April 1, 1987, the station came under the aegis of the West Japan Railway Company.

== Passenger statistics ==
In fiscal 2016, the station was used by an average of 816 passengers daily

== Surrounding area ==
- Tamba City Hall Kashiwabara Branch
- Hyogo Prefectural Kashiwabara High School
- Former Hikami-gun Towns and Villages Association High School
- Kashiwabara Jin'ya Ruins, National Historic Site

== See also ==
- List of railway stations in Japan
