= 289 series =

Japanese DC electric multiple unit train type

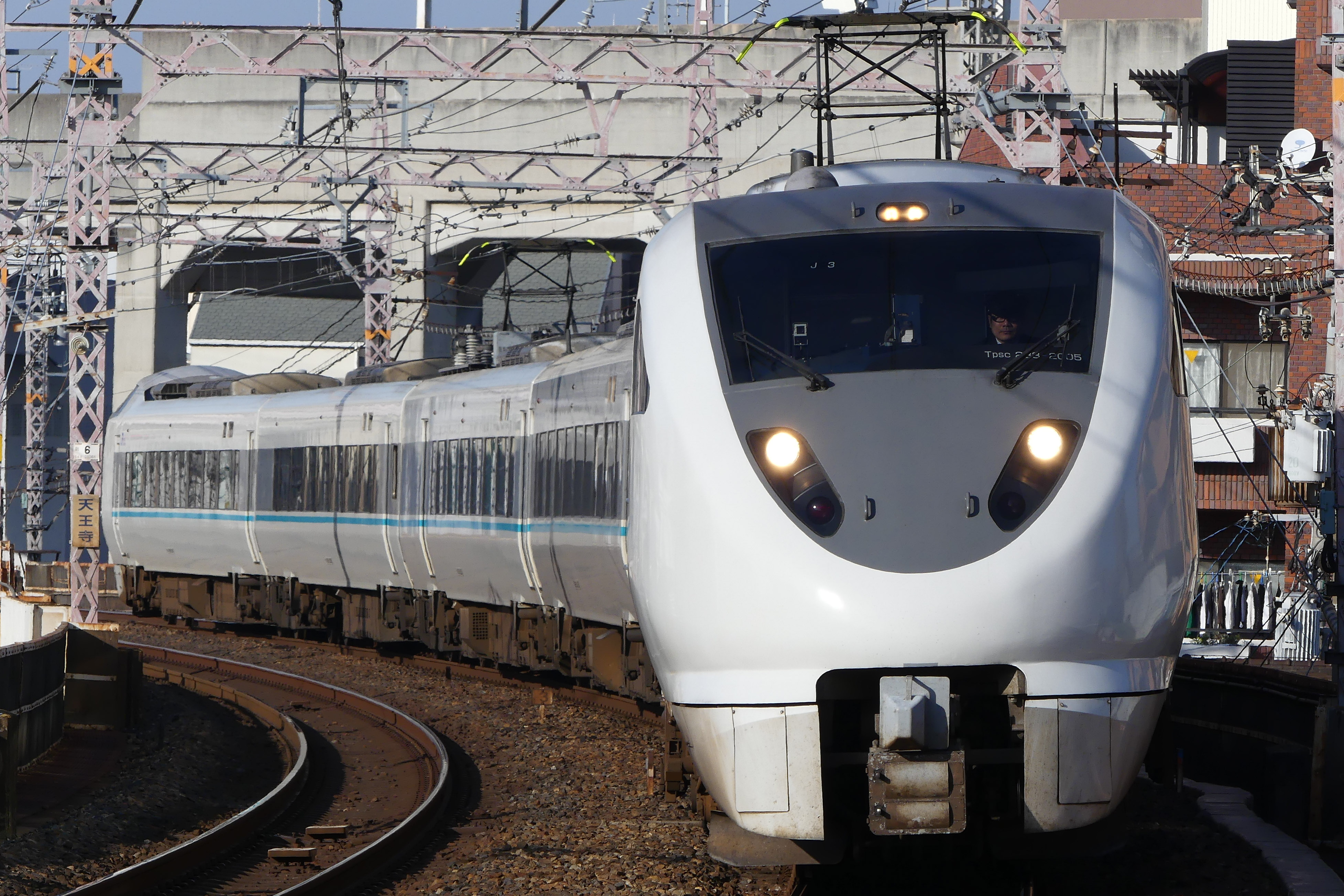
- A 6-car 289 series EMU in December 2016
- Family name: Hitachi A-train, as for 683 series
- Replaced: 381 series
- Constructed: 2002–2005 (as 683 series)
- Entered service: 31 October 2015
- Refurbished: 2015 (converted from 683 series)
- Number built: 85 vehicles (21 sets) (as of 1 May 2019)
- Number in service: 79 vehicles (19 sets) (as of 20 June 2019)
- Formation: 3/4/6 cars per trainset
- Fleet numbers: FH301 – FH306, J01 – J05, I01 – I03, FG401, FG403, FG406, FG408 – FG411
- Operator: JR West
- Depots: Fukuchiyama, Kyoto

Specifications
- Car body construction: Aluminium, double-skin
- Electric system: 1,500 V DC overhead catenary
- Track gauge: 1,067 mm (3 ft 6 in)

The 289 series (289系, 289-kei) is a DC electric multiple unit (EMU) train type operated by West Japan Railway Company (JR-West) in Japan on limited express services in the Kyoto and Osaka area since October 2015. The trains were converted from former dual-voltage (1,500 V DC and 20 kV AC) 683-2000 series EMUs formerly used on Shirasagi services and made surplus following the 14 March 2015 timetable revision.

== Operations ==
- ■ Kounotori, formed as 4- or 4+3-car sets
- ■ Kuroshio, formed as 6- or 6+3-car sets
- ■ Rakuraku Harima, formed as 6-car sets

The 289 series trains were initially introduced on 31 October 2015 on Hashidate, Kinosaki, Kounotori (formed as 4- or 4+3-car sets) and on Kuroshio services formed as 6- or 6+3-car sets services, displacing the remaining JNR-era 381 series EMUs. Since the timetable revision on 26 March 2016, the 4- or 4+3-cars sets are used only on Kounotori services.

While the trains are similar in appearance and performance characteristics to the 287 series trains, they cannot operate in multiple.

== Formations ==
As of 1 April 2016, the fleet consists of five six-car sets and three three-car sets (39 vehicles in total) based at Kyoto Depot for use on Kuroshio services, and seven four-car sets and six three-car sets (46 vehicles in total) based at Fukuchiyama Depot for use on Kounotori services.

=== 6-car Kuroshio sets ===
The six-car Kuroshio sets, numbered J01 to J05, are formed as follows.

Car No.	1	2	3	4	5	6
Designation	Tsc	T	M	T		Mc
Numbering	KuRo 288-20xx	SaHa 289-25xx	MoHa 289-34xx	SaHa 288-22xx	SaHa 289-25xx	KuMoHa 289-35xx

Cars 1 and 4 each have one scissors-type pantograph.

=== 3-car Kuroshio sets ===
The three-car Kuroshio sets, numbered I01 to I03, are formed as follows.

Car No.	7	8	9
Designation	Tc	T	Mc
Numbering	KuHa 288-27xx	SaHa 289-24xx	KuMoHa 289-35xx

Car 7 has one scissors-type pantograph.

=== 4-car Kounotori sets ===
The seven four-car Kounotori sets, numbered FG401, FG403, FG406, FG408 to FG411 and based at Fukuchiyama Depot, are formed as follows.

Car No.	1	2	3	4
Designation	Tsc	M	T	Mc
Numbering	KuRo 288-20xx	MoHa 289-34xx	SaHa 288-22xx	KuMoHa 289-35xx

Cars 1 and 3 each have one scissors-type pantograph.

From 2016, the KuRo 288-2000 cars were modified with only half of the car assigned as "Green car" (first class) seating, and reclassified KuRoHa 288-2000.

=== 3-car Kounotori sets ===
The six three-car Kounotori sets, numbered FH302 to FH305, are formed as follows.

Car No.	5	6	7
Designation	Tc	T	Mc
Numbering	KuHa 288-27xx	SaHa 289-24xx	KuMoHa 289-35xx

Car 5 has one scissors-type pantograph.

== Exterior ==
The sets based at Fukuchiyama Depot for use on Kounotori services are finished in the same livery as the Fukuchiyama-based 287 series EMUs also used on these services, with a thin maroon line below the windows. The sets based at Kyoto Depot for use on Kuroshio services have an "ocean green" turquoise line below the windows.

== Interior ==
The 289 series trains feature western-style toilets, universal access toilets, and AC outlets for passenger use are provided on the end walls of the passenger saloons.

== History ==
JR-West announced the first details of its plans to introduce the new 289 series trains on 28 April 2015. The first four-car set converted was test-run in May 2015.

The trains entered revenue service from 31 October 2015, replacing older 381 series trains.

Set FH301 was returned to the 683 series from April 2019. Set FH306 followed the suit in June 2019.
