= Kuroi Station (Hyōgo) =

Railway station in Tamba, Hyōgo Prefecture, Japan

Kuroi Station 黒井駅
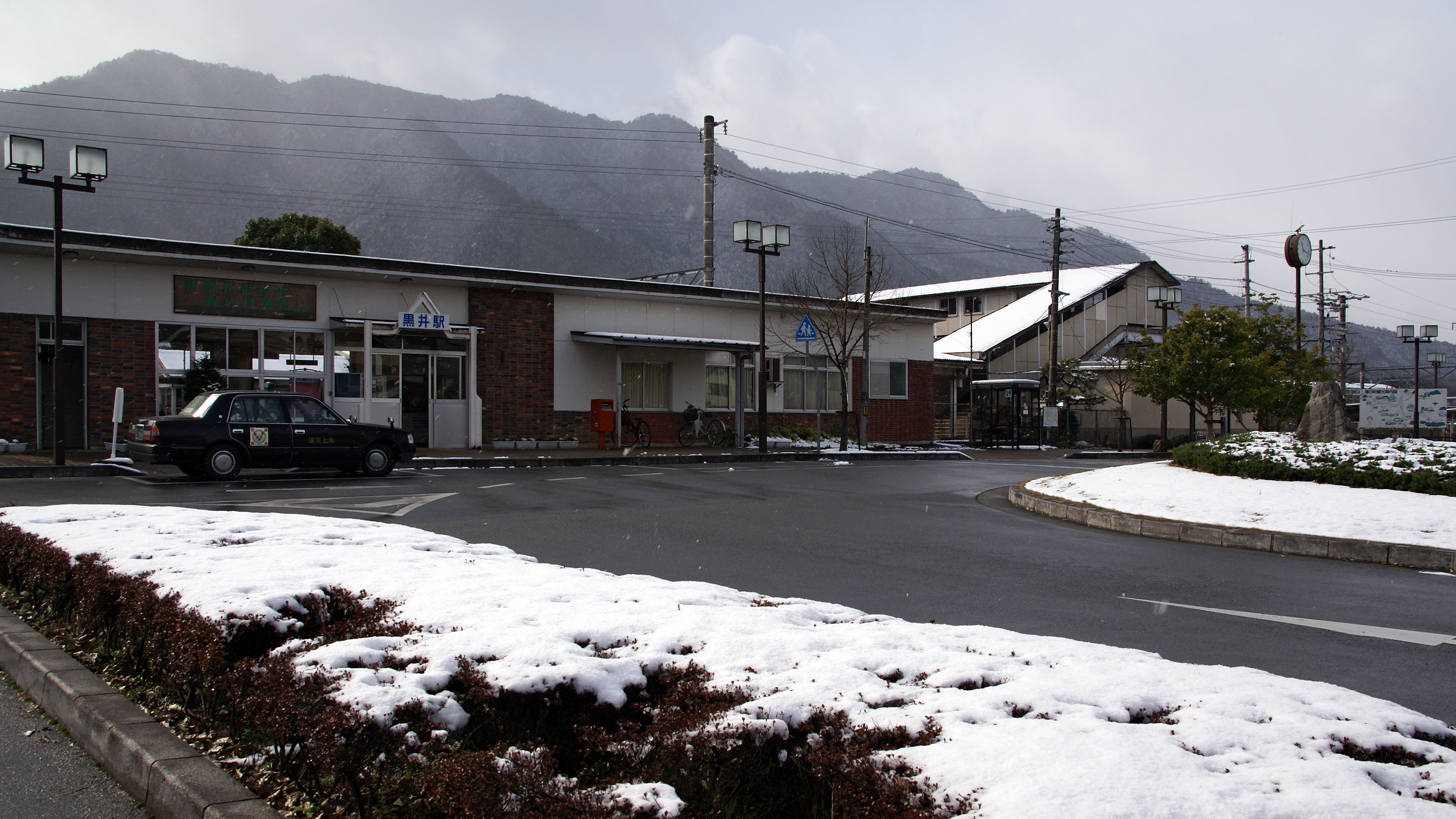
- Kuroi Station in December 2006

General information
- Location: Kasugacho Kuroi, Tamba-shi, Hyōgo-ken 669-4141; Japan
- Coordinates: 35.168678°N 135.097233°E
- Owner: West Japan Railway Company
- Operator: West Japan Railway Company
- Line: Fukuchiyama Line
- Distance: 87.5 km (54.4 miles) from Amagasaki
- Platforms: 2 side platforms
- Connections: Bus stop

Other information
- Status: Unstaffed
- Website: Official website

History
- Opened: 15 July 1899

Passengers
- FY2016: 486 daily
Location
- Location within Hyōgo Prefecture Location within Japan

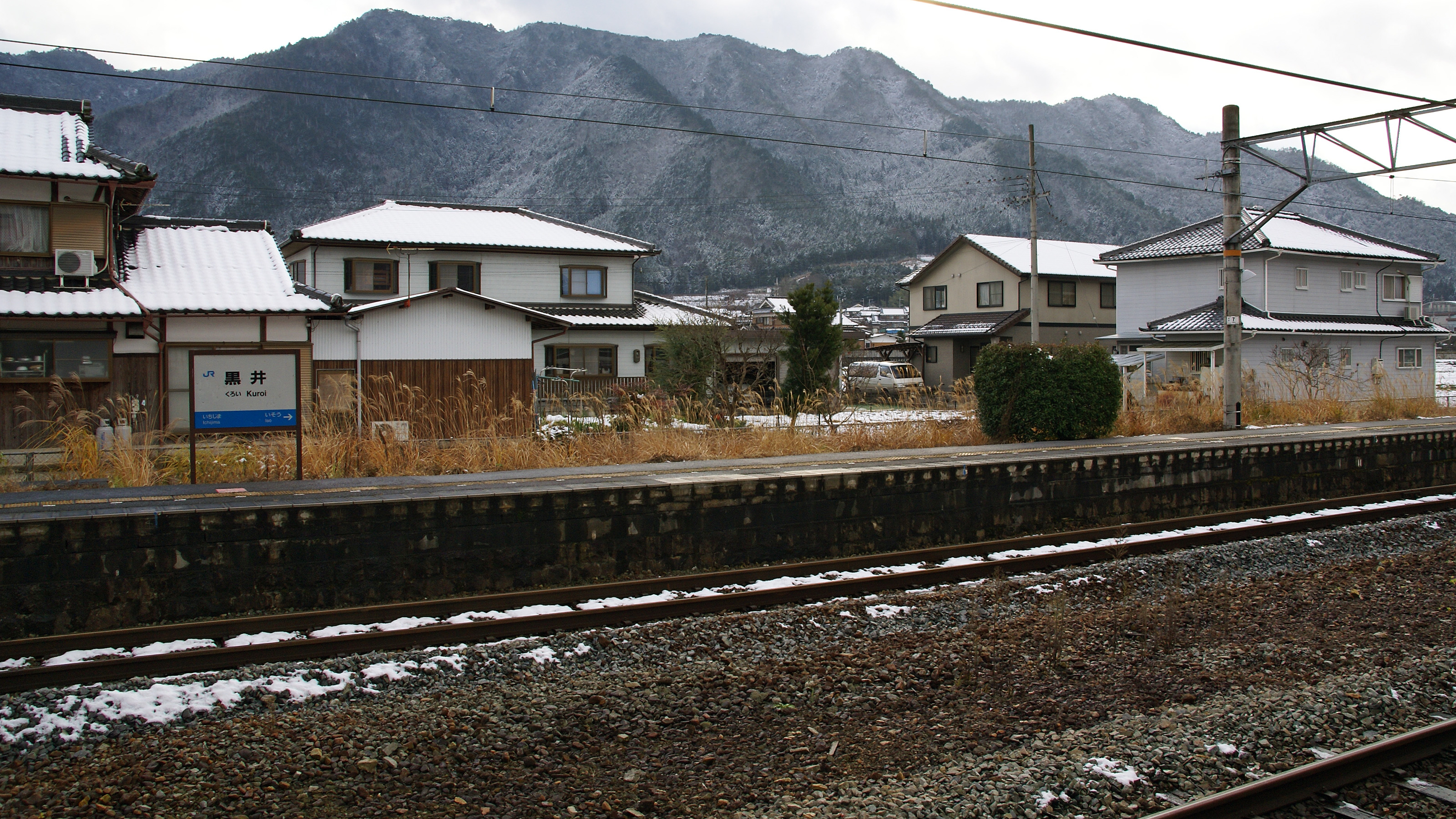
Kuroi Station platform, December 2006

Kuroi Station (黒井駅, Kuroi-eki) is a passenger railway station located in the city of Tamba, Hyōgo Prefecture, Japan, operated by West Japan Railway Company (JR West).

== Lines ==
Kuroi Station is served by the Fukuchiyama Line, and is located 87.5 kilometers from the terminus of the line at Amagasaki.

== Station layout ==
The station consists of two opposed ground-level side platforms connected to the station building by a footbridge. The station is unattended. The station building is located along the platform serving Track 1.

=== Platforms ===
1	■ Fukuchiyama Line	for Sasayamaguchi and Sanda
2	■ Fukuchiyama Line	for Fukuchiyama

== Adjacent stations ==
«	Service	»
Fukuchiyama Line
Isō	Local	Ichijima
Isō	Tambaji Rapid Service	Ichijima

== History ==
Kuroi Station opened on July 15, 1899, as a station of Hankaku Railway, which was nationalized in 1907. With the privatization of the Japan National Railways (JNR) on April 1, 1987, the station came under the aegis of the West Japan Railway Company.

== Passenger statistics ==
In fiscal 2016, the station was used by an average of 486 passengers daily

== Surrounding area ==
- former Kasuga Town Hall)
- Tamba City Kasuga Library
- Kasuga Culture Hall
- Kasuga Museum of History and Folklore
- Kuroi Castle (nationally designated historic site)

== See also ==
- List of railway stations in Japan
