= Amagasaki Station (JR West) =

Railway station in Amagasaki, Hyōgo Prefecture, Japan

Amagasaki Station 尼崎駅
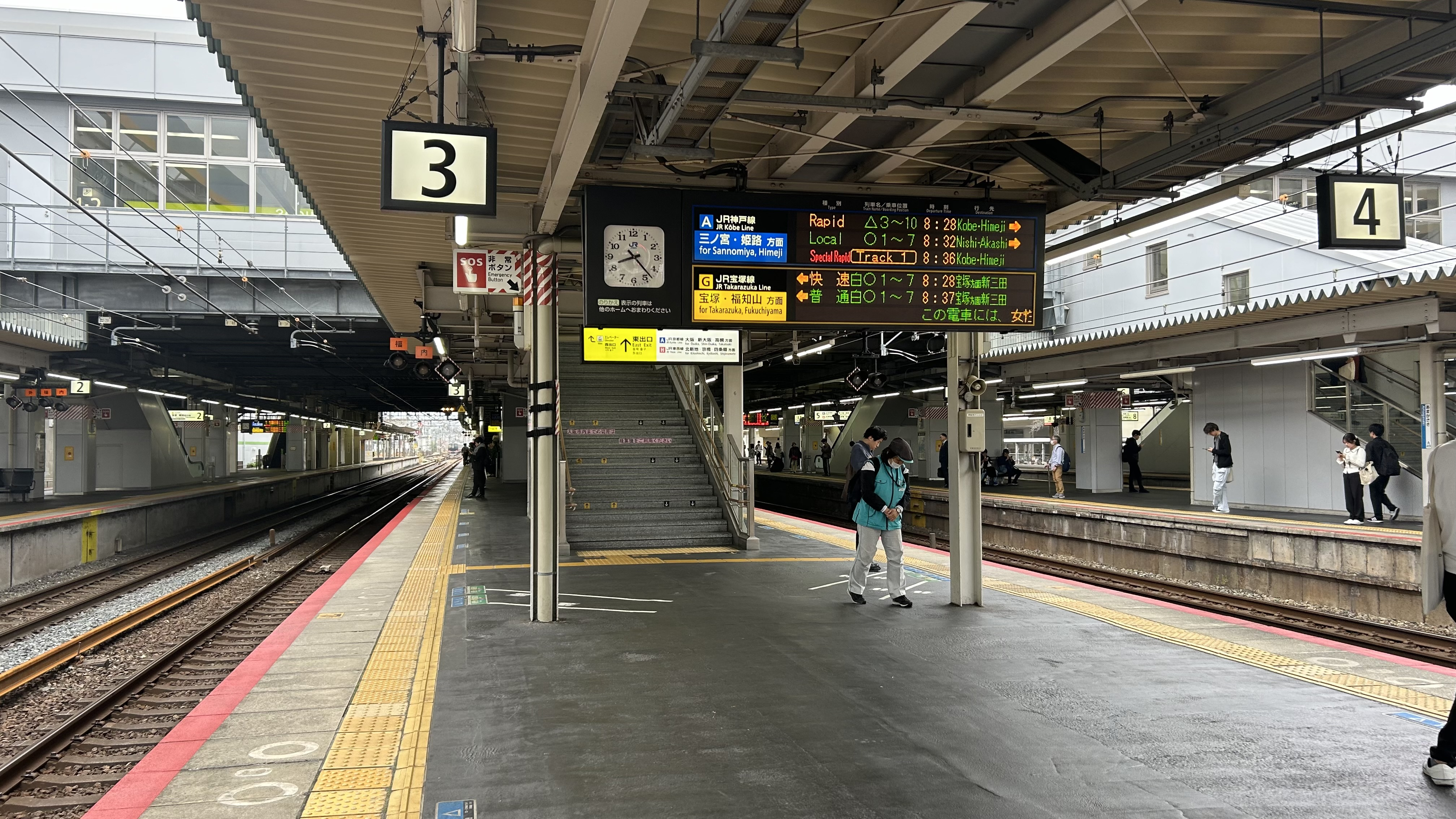
- Amagasaki Station in November 2024

General information
- Location: 1-1 Shioe Itchome, Amagasaki City, Hyōgo Prefecture; Japan
- Coordinates: 34°43′54″N 135°25′54″E
- Operator: JR West
- Lines: A JR Kōbe Line (Tōkaidō Main Line); G JR Takarazuka Line; H JR Tōzai Line
- Platforms: 4 island platforms
- Tracks: 8

Construction
- Structure type: At grade

Other information
- Station code: JR-A49 (Kobe Line); JR-G49 (Fukuchiyama Line); JR-H49 (Tozai Line)

History
- Opened: 1 June 1874; 152 years ago
- Former names: Kanzaki (until 1949)

Passengers
- FY 2023: 87,012 daily
Location
- Location within Hyōgo Prefecture Location within Kansai region Location within Japan

Amagasaki Station (尼崎駅, Amagasaki-eki) is a railway station on the Tōkaidō Main Line (JR Kōbe Line), Fukuchiyama Line (JR Takarazuka Line) and JR Tōzai Line of West Japan Railway Company (JR West), located in Amagasaki, Hyōgo, Japan. Until 1997, Amagasaki was only a local stop, but it has since become a major junction with the opening of the JR Tōzai Line. Today, all commuter trains and limited express trains bound for the Fukuchiyama Line stop here.

Though Amagasaki is the official terminal of the Fukuchiyama Line and the JR Tōzai Line, all Fukuchiyama Line train services continue east to Osaka and beyond on the Tōkaidō Line or connect with the Gakkentoshi Line through the JR Tōzai Line. Tōzai Line trains continue west to Nishi-Akashi and beyond on the Tōkaidō Line, and Takarazuka and beyond on the Fukuchiyama Line.

The station is referred to as "JR Amagasaki" to distinguish between the station and Amagasaki Station operated by Hanshin Electric Railway. While these two stations are situated relatively close to each other, passengers transferring between these two stations must take buses to transfer between trains.

== Lines ==
- Tōkaidō Line (JR Kobe Line)
- Fukuchiyama Line (JR Takarazuka Line)
- JR Tōzai Line

== Station layout ==
The station has four ground-level island platforms serving eight tracks.

1	■ JR Kōbe Line	special rapid services for Sannomiya and Himeji part of rapid services for Sannomiya and Himeji (passing Suma, Tarumi and Maiko in the evening)
2	■ JR Takarazuka Line	for Takarazuka and Fukuchiyama (mainly trains starting Osaka and Fukuchiyama Line limited express trains "Kounotori")
3	■ JR Takarazuka Line	from the JR Kyōto Line and the JR Tōzai Line for Takarazuka
3	■ JR Kōbe Line	part of local trains for Sannomiya and Nishi-Akashi
4	■ JR Kōbe Line	local trains and rapid services for Sannomiya and Himeji
5, 6	■ JR Kyōto Line	local trains and rapid services for Osaka, Shin-Osaka and Takatsuki
5, 6	■ JR Tōzai Line	for Kitashinchi and Kyobashi and Shijonawate
7	■ JR Takarazuka Line	for Osaka and Shin-Osaka (including Fukuchiyama Line limited express trains "Konotori", passing Tsukamoto)
7	■ JR Tōzai Line	part of trains for Kitashinchi, Kyobashi and Shijonawate in the rush hour direct rapid service for Oji and Nara via the Osaka Higashi Line
8	■ JR Kyōto Line	special rapid services for Osaka, Shin-Osaka and Takatsuki part of rapid services for Osaka, Shin-Osaka and Takatsuki
8	■ JR Takarazuka Line	to Osaka (partly in the morning, passing Tsukamoto)

- This station is an intermediate station on the "JR Kōbe Line". However, the Tōkaidō Line only for Sannomiya is informed as the "JR Kōbe Line" and the line for Osaka and Kyoto as the "JR Kyōto Line", because the Tōkaidō Line between this station and Osaka is parts of the sections of the "JR Kōbe Line" and the "JR Takarazuka Line". The trains from the JR Takarazuka Line which terminate at Osaka and Shin-Osaka are informed as the "JR Takarazuka Line" for passing Tsukamoto Station.

Limited express trains
- Kounotori (Shin-Osaka - Fukuchiyama, Toyooka, Kinosaki Onsen)

== Adjacent stations ==
«	Service	»
Tōkaidō Line (JR Kōbe Line)
Tsukamoto (JR-A48)	Local	Tachibana (JR-A50)
Osaka (JR-A47)	Rapid Service	Nishinomiya (JR-A52)
Osaka (JR-A47)	Special Rapid Service	Ashiya (JR-A54)
Fukuchiyama Line (JR Takarazuka Line)
Tsukamoto (through the JR Kyoto Line); Osaka (originating and terminating at Osaka)	Local	Tsukaguchi (JR-G50)
Osaka (JR-G47)	Regional Rapid Service	Itami (JR-G52)
Osaka (JR-G47)	Rapid Service; Tambaji Rapid Service	Itami (JR-G52)
Kashima (JR-H48)	Regional Rapid Service (returning at Tsukaguchi)	Tsukaguchi (JR-G50)
Kashima (JR-H48)	Rapid Service (returning at Tsukaguchi)	Tsukaguchi (JR-G50)
Osaka (JR-G47)	Limited Express "Konotori"	Takarazuka (JR-G56)
JR Tōzai Line
Kashima (JR-H48)	Local	Tachibana (JR-A50)
Kashima (JR-H48)	Regional Rapid Service	Tachibana (JR-A50); Tsukaguchi (JR-G50)
Kashima (JR-H48)	Rapid Service	Tsukaguchi (JR-G50); Itami (JR-G52)

== History ==
Amagasaki Station opened on 1 June 1874.

Station numbering was introduced in March 2018 with Amagasaki being assigned station number JR-A49 for the Kobe Line, JR-G49 for the Fukuchiyama Line, and JR-H49 for the Tozai Line.

== See also ==
- Amagasaki Station (Hanshin)
- Amagasaki rail crash
