= Shūson Katō =

- 加藤楸邨
- Born: May 26, 1905; Tokyo
- Died: July 3, 1993; Tokyo
- Occupation: Poet
- Employer: Aoyama Gakuin Women's Junior College
- Awards: Dakotsu Prize (1968); Japan Art Academy Prize; Asahi Prize (1991)

Shūson Katō (Japanese: 加藤楸邨; May 26, 1905 – July 3, 1993) was a Japanese haiku poet and literature scholar.

Shūson Katō was born Takeo Kato on May 26, 1905 in Tokyo. His father, a railway station master, and mother were Christians and Shūson was baptized as a Christian as well. His education ended at middle school because after his father's death, as eldest son he was responsible for the care of his mother and family. Shūson started working as an assistant teacher at Kasukabe Chu-gakko (Kasukabe Junior High School). Initially, Shūson favored writing tanka over haiku, but embraced the latter when he became a disciple of Shūōshi Mizuhara.

His work embraced somber themes. He said

As soon as we begin searching for truth and shake up our daily routine for that purpose, we discover an abysmal chasm lying under the surface at an unexpected spot. I wanted to bring back my personal discoveries from those chasms. I wanted to uncover my true self, the self that had been stirring silently beneath the peace and conventionalities of my daily life. And I wanted to fill my poetry with that experience, as if with a melancholy breath of air.

In his 30s, Shūson studied Japanese literature at Tokyo Bunrika Daigaku and graduated in 1937. In 1939 he published his first collection of haiku, Kanrai (Thunder in Midwinter) and founded a magazine of the same name the next year, which published the early work of poets like Tōta Kaneko and Tsugio Ando. He also became a respected scholar of the work of haiku master Matsuo Bashō.

In 1945, his family's home was destroyed in a World War II air raid, which he later famously contrasted with the crumbling of a peony in a celebrated haiku. Over the decade and a half after the war, he suffered significant health problems involving his lungs. During this time, in 1954, he became a professor at Aoyama Gakuin Junior College in Tokyo. He continued to write haiku, saying "Without my haiku I am nothing. It is only haiku I live for, and only haiku that keep me alive."

From 1970 until the end of his life, he selected poems from thousands of submissions for the weekly haiku page of the newspaper Asahi Shimbun. His collected works were published by Kodnsha in 1957 and again in 1980-82.

Shūson Katō died on 3 July 1993 in Tokyo.

== Awards and honors ==
Shūson Katō was awarded the Asahi Prize by the newspaper Asahi Shimbun in 1991. He was a co-winner of the 1968 Dakotsu Prize for his collection Visionary Deer.

== Personal life ==
Shūson married in 1929 and had three children.

== Bibliography ==
- Kanrai (Thunder in Midwinter, 1939)
- Sky after the Snow (1943)
- Memory of the Flames (1948)
- Mountain Range (1955)
- Collected Works. Kodansha (1957)
- Visionary Deer. Shichosha (1968)
- Complete Collected Works. Kodansha (1980-82)
