= Sumio =

- Gender: Male

Origin
- Origin: Japanese
- Meaning: Different meanings depending on the kanji used

Sumio (written: 澄男, 澄夫, 澄雄, 純男, 純生 or 寿美雄) is a masculine Japanese given name. Notable people with the name include:

- Sumio Endo (遠藤 純男; born 1950), Japanese judoka
- Sumio Harada (born 1960), Japanese wildlife photographer, author, public speaker, and conservationist
- Sumio Hirota (弘田 澄男; born 1949), Japanese former professional baseball outfielder
- Sumio Iijima (飯島 澄男; born 1939), Japanese physicist
- Sumio Kobayashi (小林 純生; born 1982), Japanese classical composer
- Sumio Mabuchi (馬淵 澄夫; born 1960), Japanese politician
- Sumio Miwa (三輪 寿美雄; born 1932), Japanese racewalker
- Sumio Mori (森 澄雄; 1919–2010), Japanese poet
- Sumio Shiratori (白鳥 澄夫; born 1948), Japanese composer and music producer
- Sumio Watanabe (渡辺 澄夫; born 1959), Japanese mathematician and engineer
