= Ayako Hosomi =

Japanese poet (1907–1997)

- Born: March 31, 1907; Aogaki, Japan
- Died: September 6, 1997 (aged 90)
- Education: Japan Women's University
- Occupation: Poet
- Spouse: Kin'ichi Sawaki

Ayako Hosomi (Japanese: 細見綾子; March 31, 1907 – September 6, 1997) was a Japanese haiku poet and publisher. Her haiku collections during her lifetime amounted to ten volumes.

Hosomi was born in Aogaki, Hyōgo. Her father was mayor of the town. In 1923, she enrolled in the Department of Japanese Literature at Japan Women's University.

Hosomi married the poet Kin'ichi Sawaki in 1947. She gave birth to her first child in 1951 at the age of 44.

Hosomi was a member of the Modern Haiku Association. She was awarded the Dakotsu Prize in 1979 and the Order of the Sacred Treasure, 4th class, in 1981.
