= Harada =

Harada (written: 原田) is the 52nd most common Japanese surname. Notable personalities with this surname include:

- Atsushi Harada (原田 篤; born 1978), Japanese actor
- Daisuke Harada (原田 大輔; born 1986), Japanese professional wrestler
- Harada Daiun Sogaku (原田 大雲祖岳; 1871–1961), Japanese Zen Buddhist monk
- Hiroyo Harada (原田 裕代; born 1970), Japanese swimmer
- Kai Harada (原田 海; born 1999), Japanese rock climber
- Kaz Harada (カズハラダ, died 1998), Japanese anime producer
- Kaname Harada (原田 要; 1916–2016), Japanese World War II flying ace
- Katsuhiro Harada (原田 勝弘; born 1970), Japanese game producer
- Kiichi Harada (原田 喜市; born 1972), Japanese equestrian
- Koichiro Harada (原田 耕一郎; born 1941), Japanese mathematician
- Maha Harada (原田 マハ; born 1962), Japanese novelist
- Masahiko Harada (原田 雅彦; born 1943), Japanese boxing champion
- Masahiko Harada (原田 雅彦; born 1968), Japanese ski jumper
- Shintaro Harada (原田 慎太郎; born 1980), Japanese footballer
- Sumio Harada (原田 慎太郎; born 1960), Japanese American photographer
- Taizo Harada (原田 泰造; born 1970), Japanese comedian and actor
- Takashi Harada, associated with the Harada Method of management development
- Takeichi Harada (原田 武一; 1899–1978), Japanese tennis player
- Tasuku Harada (原田 助; 1863–1940), Japanese pastor, former president of Doshisha University
- Tetsuya Harada (原田 哲也; born 1970), Japanese motorcyclist
- Yasuko Harada (原田 康子; 1928–2009), Japanese novelist
- Yoshitsugu Harada (原田 令嗣; born 1952), Japanese politician of the Liberal Democratic Party

== See also ==
- Toyo Harada, a comic book superhero in Valiant Comics
- 6399 Harada, a minor planet
