= Kaibara =

Kaibara may refer to:

- Kaibara Ekken (1630–1714), a Japanese neo-Confucian philosopher and botanist
- Kaibara, Hyōgo, a former town, now part of Tamba city, in Japan
  - Kaibara Station
  - Kaibara Domain, a feudal domain in Edo period Japan
