= Modern Haiku Association =

Japanese poetry organization

- Formation: September 1, 1947
- Type: Poetry society
- Location: Japan
- Members: Haiku poets
- Official language: Japanese
- Website: gendaihaiku.gr.jp

The Modern Haiku Association (Japanese: 現代俳句協会) is a Japanese professional association of haiku poets and enthusiasts. It was founded in 1947 by Hakyō Ishida, Hideo Kanda, and Saitō Sanki. The organization publishes the journal Modern Haiku and has a database of kigo, or season words, that can be used in haiku.

== See also ==
- Association of Haiku Poets
