= Elegy of the North =

1957 Japanese film

- 挽歌
- Directed by: Heinosuke Gosho
- Written by: Shigeko Yuki; Toshio Yasumi; Yasuko Harada (novel)
- Produced by: Jiro Kaga; Yoshishige Uchiyama
- Starring: Yoshiko Kuga; Masayuki Mori; Mieko Takamine; Fumio Watanabe
- Cinematography: Junichi Segawa
- Music by: Yasushi Akutagawa
- Production company: Kabuki-za
- Distributed by: Shochiku
- Release date: 1 September 1957 (Japan)
- Running time: 117 minutes
- Country: Japan
- Language: Japanese

Elegy of the North (挽歌, Banka), also titled Northern Elegy or Dirge, is a 1957 Japanese drama film directed by Heinosuke Gosho. It is based on the novel Banka by Yasuko Harada.

== Plot ==
Reiko, a young, disabled woman (she suffers from a limp left arm after a joint inflammation in her childhood), and member of an amateur theatre troupe, lives with her widowed father and her grandmother in a town on Hokkaido. She starts a passionate affair with the much older and married architect Katsuragi. Katsuragi's wife herself has been in an ongoing affair with medical student Tatsumi, who is obsessed with her and refuses her request to break off the relationship. Fascinated by Mrs. Katsuragi, Reiko manages to make personal contact with her. The women get acquainted with each other, but Reiko soon develops a deeper affection for Mrs. Katsuragi, which might be the love for a surrogate mother, or even physical attraction. Reiko, feeling incomplete due to her disability and torn between her feelings for Katsuragi and his wife, accuses him of not loving but only pitying her. When she finally tells Mrs. Katsuragi of the affair with her husband, the older woman refuses to scold her despite her pleas. After Mrs. Katsuragi has committed suicide as a result, Reiko returns once more to the couple's house, but avoids meeting with her lover. She joins the theatre troupe which is on the way to an out of town stage show, expressing her relief about leaving her recent past behind.

== Cast ==
- Yoshiko Kuga as Reiko Hyodo
- Masayuki Mori as Setsuo Katsuragi
- Mieko Takamine as Akiko Katsuragi
- Fumio Watanabe as Tatsumi Furuse
- Akira Ishihama as Mikio Fusada
- Tatsuo Saitō as Reiko's father
- Kumeko Urabe as Reiko's grandmother
- Chikako Kaga as Setsuo's niece
- Sanae Takasugi as Mrs. Tanioka

== Legacy ==
In his 2008 Critical Handbook of Japanese Film Directors, film historian Alexander Jacoby termed Elegy of the North a "study in angst set atmosperically against the bleak backdrop of a Hokkaido port town".

In 2022, the film was screened at the Museum of Modern Art, New York, as part of its Beyond Ozu: Hidden Gems of Shochiku Studios retrospective.
