= Association of Haiku Poets =

Japanese poetry organization

- Formation: November 16, 1961
- Type: Poetry society
- Location: Japan
- Members: Haiku poets
- Official language: Japanese
- Website: www.haijinkyokai.jp

The Association of Haiku Poets (Japanese: 俳人協会) is a Japanese professional association of haiku poets and enthusiasts. It was founded in 1961 by a group of haiku poets that separated from the Modern Haiku Association. The association manages the Museum of Haiku Literature in Tokyo.

== Past presidents ==
- Nakamura Kusatao (1961-1962)
- Shūōshi Mizuhara (1962-1978)
- Rinka Ohno (1978-1982)
- Atsushi Azumi (1982-1987)
- Kin'ichi Sawaki (1987-1993)
- Tetsunosuke Matsuzaki (1993-2002)
- Takaha Shugyo (2002-2017)
- Akira Ohkushi (2017- )

== Museum of Haiku Literature ==
A library specializing in haiku books was completed in Hyakunincho, Shinjuku-ku, Tokyo in 1977 at the initiative of the Haiku Poet Association. The main purpose is to collect, preserve, display, and view materials related to haiku. The building has four floors above ground and three below ground, with the Haiku Poet Association's office on the first and second floors. As of 2011, the library's collection includes over 54,000 haiku collections and 331,000 haiku magazines.

== See also ==
- Modern Haiku Association
