= Tomiyasu Fūsei =

- 富安風生
- Born: April 16, 1885; Aichi Prefecture
- Died: February 22, 1979
- Education: University of Tokyo
- Occupation: Haiku poet

Tomiyasu Fūsei (Japanese: 富安風生; April 16, 1885 – February 22, 1979) was a Japanese haiku poet. He is considered one of the twentieth century's best haiku poets.

He was born Tomiyasu Kenji on April 16, 1885 in a village near Nagoya in Aichi Prefecture, Japan. In 1910, he graduated from the Tōkyō Teidai Hōka Daigaku Dokuhōka, the German law department of Tokyo Imperial University. He worked in the Japanese Ministry of Communications, eventually becoming Deputy Minister of Communications. In internal debates in the Ministry that resulted in the state control of the electricity sector, he was an advocate for the more moderate stance against nationalization. He retired in 1937 to devote himself to travel and haiku.

Tomiyasu was introduced to haiku early, as his grandfather and older brother were amateur poets. He began writing haiku in earnest in 1918. He formed the Tōdai Haikukai (Tōkyō University Haiku Society) with Nakada Mizuho, Shūōshi Mizuhara, and Yamaguchi Seishi in 1922. All would become contributors to Hototogisu, the leading haiku magazine. He and some of his government co-workers founded another magazine, Wakaba (Young Leaves). Tomiyasu was one of a group of traditionalist poets associated with Hototogisu reacting against contemporary trends in haiku. He strove for poetry that reflected everyday life and his own attitude towards it. He said "In the end I always take a passive attitude toward every event that comes along my way."

Tomiyasu was one of the creators of twenty-four shikishi (poem cards) presented to the Haiku Society of America in honor of their tenth anniversary in 1978. The shikishi are now in the American Haiku Archives at the California State Library in Sacramento.

Tomiyasu died on 22 February 1979.

== Bibliography ==
- Flowers of Grass (1933)
- Jusan'ya (The Thirteenth Night). Tokyo: Ryuseikaku, 1937.
- Wind through the Pine Trees (1940)
- Ajisai (Hydrangeas). Tokyo: Meguro Shoten, 1946.
- Village Life (1947)
- Evening Cool (1955)
- (editor) Haiku Saijiki. 5 vol. Tokyo: Heibonisha, 1959.
- Since My Eightieth Birthday (1968)
