= Tomoji =

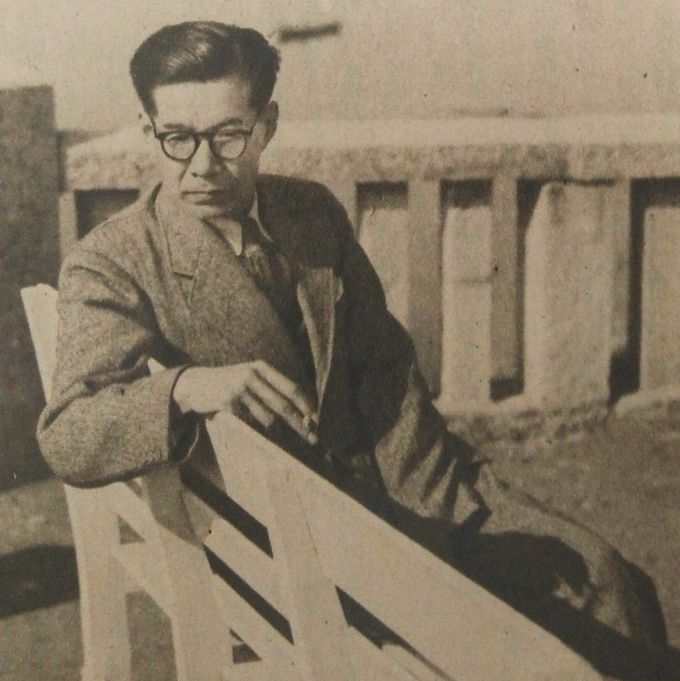
- Tomoji Abe (1903–1973), Japanese writer
- Pronunciation: tomodʑi (IPA)
- Gender: Male

Origin
- Origin: Japanese
- Meaning: Different meanings depending on the kanji used

Other names
- Alternative spelling: Tomozi (Kunrei-shiki) Tomozi (Nihon-shiki) Tomoji (Hepburn)

Tomoji is a masculine Japanese given name.

== Written forms ==
Tomoji can be written using different combinations of kanji characters. Some examples:

- 友二, "friend, two"
- 友次, "friend, next"
- 友児, "friend, child"
- 友治, "friend, manage/cure"
- 友爾, "friend, you"
- 友慈, "friend, mercy"
- 知二, "know, two"
- 知次, "know, next"
- 知児, "know, child"
- 知治, "know, manage/cure"
- 知爾, "know, you"
- 知慈, "know, mercy"
- 智二, "intellect, two"
- 智次, "intellect, next"
- 智児, "intellect, child"
- 智治, "intellect, manage/cure"
- 共二, "together, two"
- 共次, "together, next"
- 朋二, "companion, two"
- 朋次, "companion, next"
- 朝二, "morning/dynasty, two"
- 朝次, "morning/dynasty, next"
- 朝児, "morning/dynasty, child"
- 朝治, "morning/dynasty, manage/cure"

The name can also be written in hiragana ともじ or katakana トモジ.

== Notable people with the name ==
- Tomoji Abe (阿部 知二; 1903–1973), Japanese writer
- Tomoji Eguchi (江口 倫司; born 1977), Japanese footballer
- Tomoji Nakatani (中谷 智司; born 1968), Japanese politician
- Tomoji Ishizuka (石塚 友二; 1906–1984), Japanese poet and writer
