= Ishida Hakyō =

Japanese poet and writer

- 石田 波郷
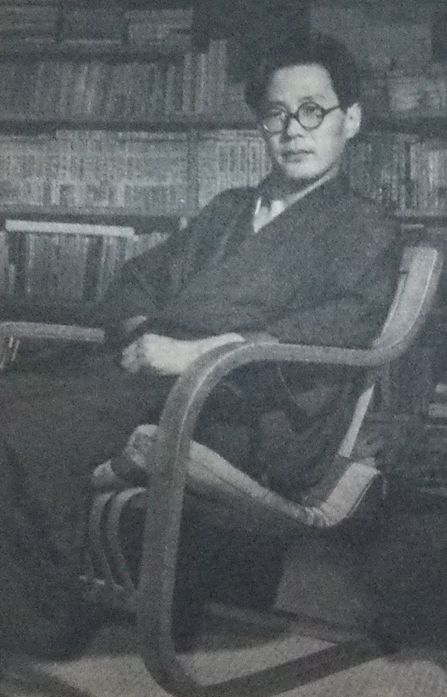
- Ishida in 1951
- Born: March 18, 1913; Matsuyama, Ehime, Japan
- Died: November 21, 1969 (aged 56)
- Education: Matsuyama Middle School; Meiji University
- Military career
- Allegiance: Empire of Japan
- Branch: Imperial Japanese Army
- Service years: 1943
- Unit: Carrier pigeon unit
- Conflicts: Second Sino-Japanese War
- Awards: Yomiuri Prize
- Other work: Haiku poet

Ishida Hakyō (石田 波郷; March 18, 1913 – November 21, 1969) was a Japanese haiku poet and military veteran.

== Biography ==
Ishida Hakyō was born on March 18, 1913, in Matsuyama, Ehime Prefecture. He attended Matsuyama Middle School, where numerous haiku poets and other authors had been educated, and was publishing his own haiku in local newspapers as early as fourth grade.

Ishida was profoundly influenced by Katsushika (1930), the haiku collection by Shūōshi Mizuhara. He moved to Tokyo and began contributing to Shūōshi's publication, Ashibi ("Staggerbush"), eventually becoming an editor at the magazine. He also began studying literature at Meiji University.

In 1935, at the age of 22, he published his first haiku collection, Ishida Hakyō kushū. In 1937, while still contributing to Ashibi, he became the founding editor of his own journal, Tsuru ("Crane"). Eventually, he broke with the Ashibi group and joined the Nihon Bungaku Hokokukai ("Patrotic Association for Japanese Literature").

In 1943, Ishida was drafted into the Imperial Japanese Army and served in a carrier pigeon unit in northern China during the Second Sino-Japanese War. His service only lasted a few months until he contracted pleurisy and was discharged. Ishida suffered serious illness the rest of his life.

The period after World War II was no easier for Ishida and his family, as they were forced to live in a shack in the ruins of Tokyo. He wrote a number of poems describing postwar desolation. Ishida had two major operations and was hospitalized from 1948 to 1950 and published a collection of five hundred haiku called Shakumyō ("Clinging to Life") about his experience.

Ishida is often grouped with fellow haiku poets Nakamura Kusatao and Katō Shūson as part of a humanist approach to poetry referred to as ningen tankyūha (人間探求派).

Ishida eventually published seven volumes of haiku. He was awarded the Yomiuri Prize in 1954.

Ishida died on November 21, 1969.
