= Sachio Ashida =

Japanese-American judoka (1924–2009)

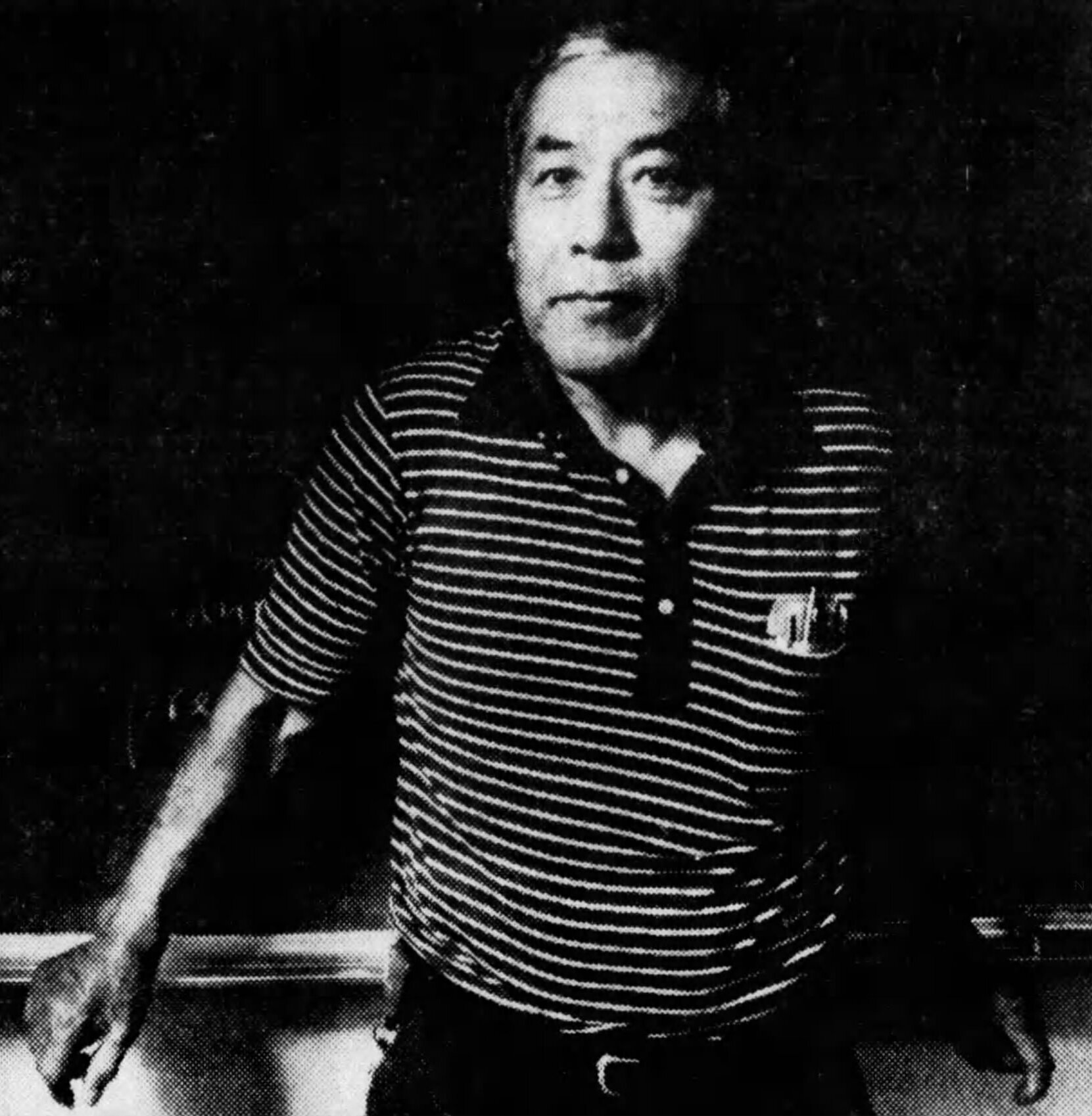
- Ashida in 1985

Personal information
- National team: United States
- Born: May 2, 1924 Tamba, Japanese Empire
- Died: June 22, 2009 (aged 85) Brockport, New York, U.S.
- Resting place: Lake View Cemetery
- Height: 5 ft 7 in (170 cm) (Note: Reports of Ashida's height vary. Dardenne (1975) and Dougherty (1998) put his height at 5 ft 4 in (1.63 m), but Bracely (1996) writes that he had a "5 foot six-inch stature" (1.68 m).)
- Weight: 176 lb (80 kg)
- Spouse: Margaret "Ellie" Elliott (m. 1956; died 2002)
- Children: 2
- Military career
- Allegiance: Japan
- Branch: Imperial Japanese Army Air Service
- Service years: 1944–1945
- Unit: 9th Army Air Force Special Attack Corps
- Conflicts: World War II

Sport
- Country: United States
- Sport: Judo
- Rank: 9th dan (九段)
- Citizenship: Japan; United States (from 1962)
- Awards: Order of the Sacred Treasure, 4th class

Academic background
- Education: University of Nebraska
- Thesis: Theoretical and Experimental Analysis of Incentive Motivation (1963)
- Doctoral advisor: William J. Arnold

Academic work
- Discipline: Experimental psychology
- Institutions: University of Michigan; SUNY Brockport

Sachio Ashida (/ˈsɑːtʃioʊ əˈʃidə/ SAH-chee-oh ə-SHEE-də; May 2, 1924 – June 22, 2009) was a Japanese-American experimental psychologist, judoka, and kamikaze pilot. He served as the judo coach for the United States at the 1976 Summer Olympics in Montreal and later as the only American referee for the sport in the 1984 Summer Olympics in Los Angeles.

Born in the Hyōgo Prefecture of the Japanese Empire, Ashida began studying judo at the age of 12 becoming a first-degree black belt at 15, the youngest age possible. During World War II, he was drafted by the Imperial Japanese Army Air Force and later trained as a kamikaze pilot. In 1945, he and his co-pilot were sent to Hiroshima hours after the nuclear weapon was detonated there to report the situation to Japanese high command. Ashida later defended the bombings, arguing that they saved millions of lives and kept the Japanese from total extinction. Following the end of the war, he traveled to the University of Nebraska where he received a doctoral degree in experimental psychology, focusing on the effects of radiation on the central nervous system. After a seven-year stint at the University of Michigan, Ashida was hired as a professor at the State University of New York at Brockport in 1970 just outside Rochester, where he worked until he retired in 2004.

Ashida was recognized for his contributions to the promotion of judo and Japanese culture in the United States. The Emperor of Japan awarded him the Order of the Sacred Treasure in 1998 for his contributions and he was inducted into several halls of fame for the sport during his lifetime. Despite his failing health, he continued participating in judo well into his seventies. A devout adherent of Zen, Ashida emphasized the role of self-discipline and self-discovery to his students, viewing the self-defense aspect of judo as a byproduct of those roles.

== Early life ==
Sachio Ashida was born on May 2, 1924, in Tamba in the Hyōgo Prefecture of the Japanese Empire to Giichiro and Yoshie Ashida. The couple had four sons – Sachio, Tadao, Takeo, and Masao – and four daughters – Sadako, Yoshiko, Akiko, and Yasuko. From Sachio and his siblings' generation, the family could trace their lineage in Japan back 54 generations, or about 1,300 years. The family was originally of a prominent samurai lineage, but lost most of their wealth in the Meiji Restoration. In his youth, Ashida studied Zen at the Kasei temple in Nishinomiya.

Ashida began studying judo in 1936 when he was 12, becoming a first-degree black belt at age 15, the youngest age possible. At eighteen, he was selected as one of 48 judoka to compete at the All-Japan Championship, to be performed in front of the Emperor and Empress of Japan. His first instructor, Genji Muneyuki, was 65 when he began teaching him, but still a relatively new graduate of the art, leading Ashida to a lifelong view that one was never too old to begin studying the martial art. Muneyuki's influence left a profound influence on Ashida; his grandson was later given the middle name Genji in his honor.

== Military service ==
Shortly before the bombing of Pearl Harbor, Ashida – then 17 years old – had been working at a factory in Kobe which built submarines and aircraft engines. During one of his shifts, he heard radio reports that the attack had been a success. His father believed that the United States' superior production ability would quickly overpower and destroy Japan, pointing to their ability to construct cars with rapidity. Ashida later recounted:

When I went home after work I told my father that we had won a great victory. He said, "This is it! We have lost the war!" I said, "What in the hell are you talking about? We destroyed the American fleet!" My father said, "You dummy! The Americans can make a new car every minute but we can't do that in Japan. What happens when they start making airplanes like they make cars?"

In 1944, Ashida was drafted by the Imperial Japanese Army Air Service as a cadet and was trained as a kamikaze pilot. He volunteered to serve as a member of the Tokkōtai (Japanese: 特攻隊), a specialized Japanese suicide unit of the Imperial Japanese Navy's pilot corps, but was ultimately assigned to the Imperial Japanese 9th Army Air Force Special Attack Corps. Ashida later joked that he had only survived the war because higher-ranking individuals always volunteered for suicide attacks before he could.

In August 1945, he was stationed at an airbase in Yokomichi on Shikoku, about sixty miles (100 km) from Hiroshima. While there, Ashida later reported, some of his comrades described hearing "a distant thump" at breakfast, but he had not heard anything. This thump was later confirmed to be Little Boy. Just seven hours following the nuclear attack on Hiroshima, Ashida and his co-pilot, Captain Fukui, were tasked with evaluating the aftermath, flying there in a canvas-skinned two-seat plane before pedaling bicycles they borrowed through the city. The two were forced to land on the outskirts of the city, as the flames were too high in the epicenter of the blast. Originally, the two had been tasked with attacking American naval units around Okinawa, either by dropping bombs on them or, if that did not pan out, flying directly into any enemy they could, but ended up as the first two military personnel to see the devastation; their report was also the first to reach high command.

When Ashida and Fukui questioned the survivors, they all responded "picadon, picadon" (ピカドン, lit. 'flash-boom') to describe the quick flash of light followed by a shockwave. Ashida later recounted that when he attempted to comfort a woman burned by the blast, her skin sloughed off whenever he touched her, and she eventually died in his arms. In another recollection, he told how he came across a woman holding a bucket containing the head of her daughter who had been blown apart by the nuclear blast.

Upon hearing the Emperor announce the surrender of Japan, Ashida recalled his voice being "very thin and halting", unlike the god he had been revered as. Following the surrender, Ashida was chosen to fly to another base and confirm to them that the surrender was official. When he returned, he discovered nine of his close friends had killed themselves.

Although initially devastated by the effects, Ashida later defended Harry S. Truman's decision, remarking to one journalist: "If America had not dropped the bombs, millions of Japanese, including me, and millions of Americans, like you, would certainly have been killed." During a talk he was asked to participate in, he stated that he believed that if the bombs had not been dropped, the Japanese would have annihilated themselves out of existence because every Japanese person would have either obstinately fought against a force they could not defeat or committed ritual suicide. He recounted how children as young as six were being trained by the Japanese Imperial government to prepare to attack Marines landing on the homeland and die defending the Emperor. When asked if nuclear weapons should be banned, Ashida responded with the Japanese aphorism: "The way to peace is to have a sword, but don't use it."

== Education ==
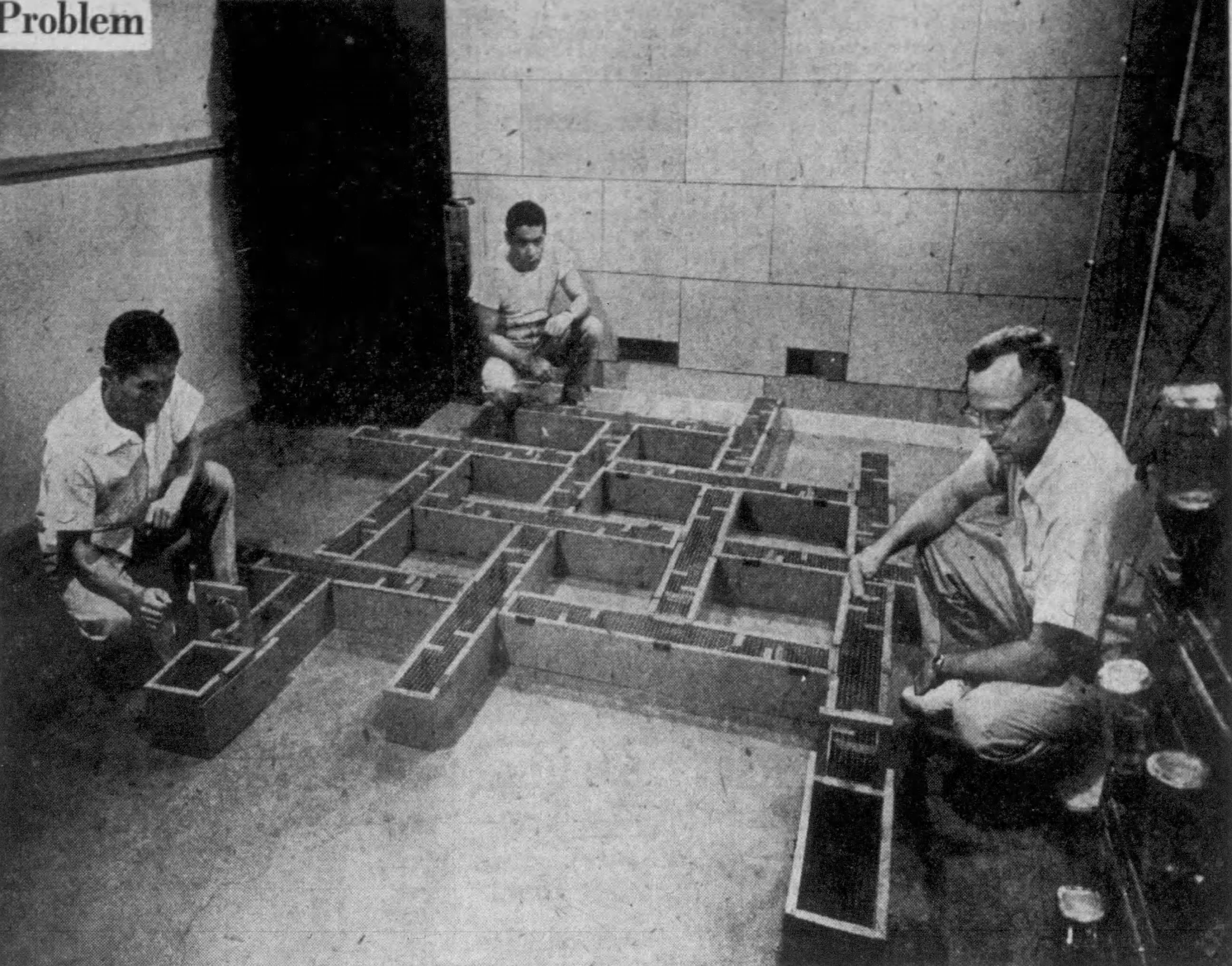
Ashida (center) with Arnold (right), inspecting a rat maze

After gaining a degree in economics from Kwansei Gakuin University, Ashida became a graduate fellow at Kyoto University to study animal behavior after reading William James's A Briefer Course in Psychology. Originally, he attempted to get into medical school but was routinely rejected. Instead, Ashida sent correspondences to the psychologist William J. Arnold, who had worked on theories Ashida was interested in, and ultimately convinced him to take Ashida on as a graduate student. In 1953, Ashida arrived in the United States to earn a doctoral degree in psychology and mathematics at the University of Nebraska. While his family was ostensibly supportive of his move to the United States, later he "heard there was debate". Ashida struggled with his English proficiency and failed his entrance exam. To prepare for the following test, he worked with a tutor, Margaret Eleanor "Ellie" Elliott; the two married in 1955, though Ashida later recounted that he was so nervous around women he had not touched one until his 30s and only could bear to shake hands with Ellie after six months of knowing her. At the time of their marriage, it was illegal in Nebraska for a white person to marry an Asian person, so the two married in Iowa, though they continued to have difficulty finding residence in Nebraska.

While there, Ashida taught judo twice weekly at the Nebraska Coliseum for free to anyone who was interested. Originally, he founded the University Judo Club when two students asked him to teach them judo in 1954, but the class became more popular as time went on, enrolling over thirty students by 1962. After receiving a master's degree in 1958, Ashida ultimately earned his doctoral degree in experimental psychology in 1963 under Arnold. His research at the time focused on the psychological effects of radiation on the central nervous system. Prior to his graduation, he received a $5,000 grant ($52,582 in 2025) for a postdoctoral fellowship to be doled out after graduation by the National Science Foundation. During his time in Nebraska, Ashida also founded the Midwestern Black Belt Holders Association and served as its president.

== Career ==
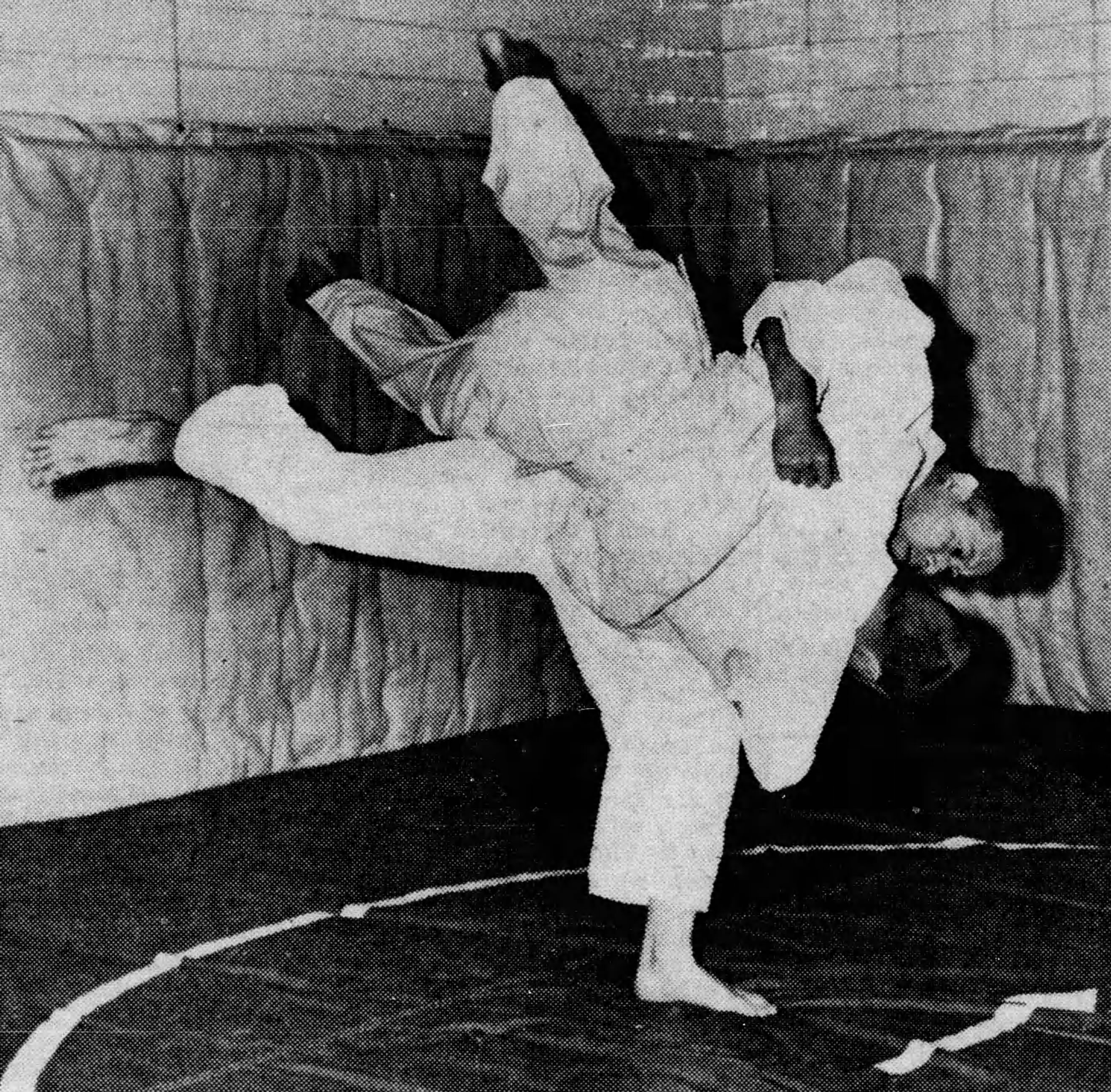
Ashida demonstrating a judo move on Larry Clifton in 1963

Ashida and his wife moved to Ann Arbor in 1963, where he began working at the University of Michigan as a visiting scholar. There, he taught judo at the local YMCA. Shortly after moving to Michigan, following his attainment of American citizenship the previous year, Ashida headed the United States judo selection committee for the Olympics. By the time he left the University of Michigan, he had attained an assistant professorship. In 1964, Ashida coached the Olympic team, with one of his protégés earning a bronze medal.

In 1970, Ashida was hired by the State University of New York at Brockport to teach psychology in the Rochester suburb of the same name. Though he had received offers at the University of California, Berkeley, and Harvard University, he felt unwelcome at both institutions and felt that his family would suffer as a result, so he chose the job offer at Brockport instead. Aside from his typical psychology classes, he also taught mathematics and statistics. Ashida's research efforts at Brockport focused largely on mouse experiments. At one point during his career, he rebuilt a guided missile computer system which he repurposed for his psychological experiments on brain tissue. He later worked on rebuilding an LGM-30 Minuteman missile computer as well. There, he also elevated the college's judo team from a six-member organization to one with 180 members, which placed third at the world championship in Belgium in 1974.

Ashida was elevated to a seventh-degree black belt in 1975, making him one of only about two hundred worldwide. Shortly thereafter, he was selected to be the judo coach for the United States during the 1976 Summer Olympics in Montreal. He was reportedly pessimistic about the United States' prospects after coming back from a 1975 championship in Vienna as only two of his twelve-man team made it to the second round and none made it to the third. When asked if he had any reservations about coaching against his native Japan, he replied simply: "But I am an American". At the 1984 Summer Olympics in Los Angeles, Ashida was the only American judo referee.

== Final years and death ==
In 2004, Ashida retired from his position at Brockport and was given emeritus status, though he continued to teach judo at the university for years thereafter. Three years later, he achieved the rank of ninth dan (九段), making him the highest-ranked judoka in the United States at the time along with only two others.

Ashida continued to participate in judo into old age. As early as 1992, his daughter described judo as "probably the only thing keeping him mobile". By 1996, he had undergone cataract surgery and had years-long issues with arthritis in his knees, but neither kept him from continuing participation in his judo instruction. Despite his condition, Ashida was well known for his ability to get low in a squatting position before a combatant would hit the ground. His fellow referees referred to this as the "Ashida squat". When Ashida asked his doctor how much longer he could bend his knees at all, his doctor responded that he did not know, since most people with Ashida's type of arthritis were already in wheelchairs. In 1998, Ashida underwent frequent chemotherapy for colon cancer, which he denied was related to his time in Hiroshima.

Shortly after Memorial Day in 2009, Ashida suffered a week-long stroke which impacted his language comprehension and ability to speak. After celebrating Father's Day with his family, the following Monday – June 22, 2009 – he had a fatal heart attack at the age of 85.

== Legacy ==
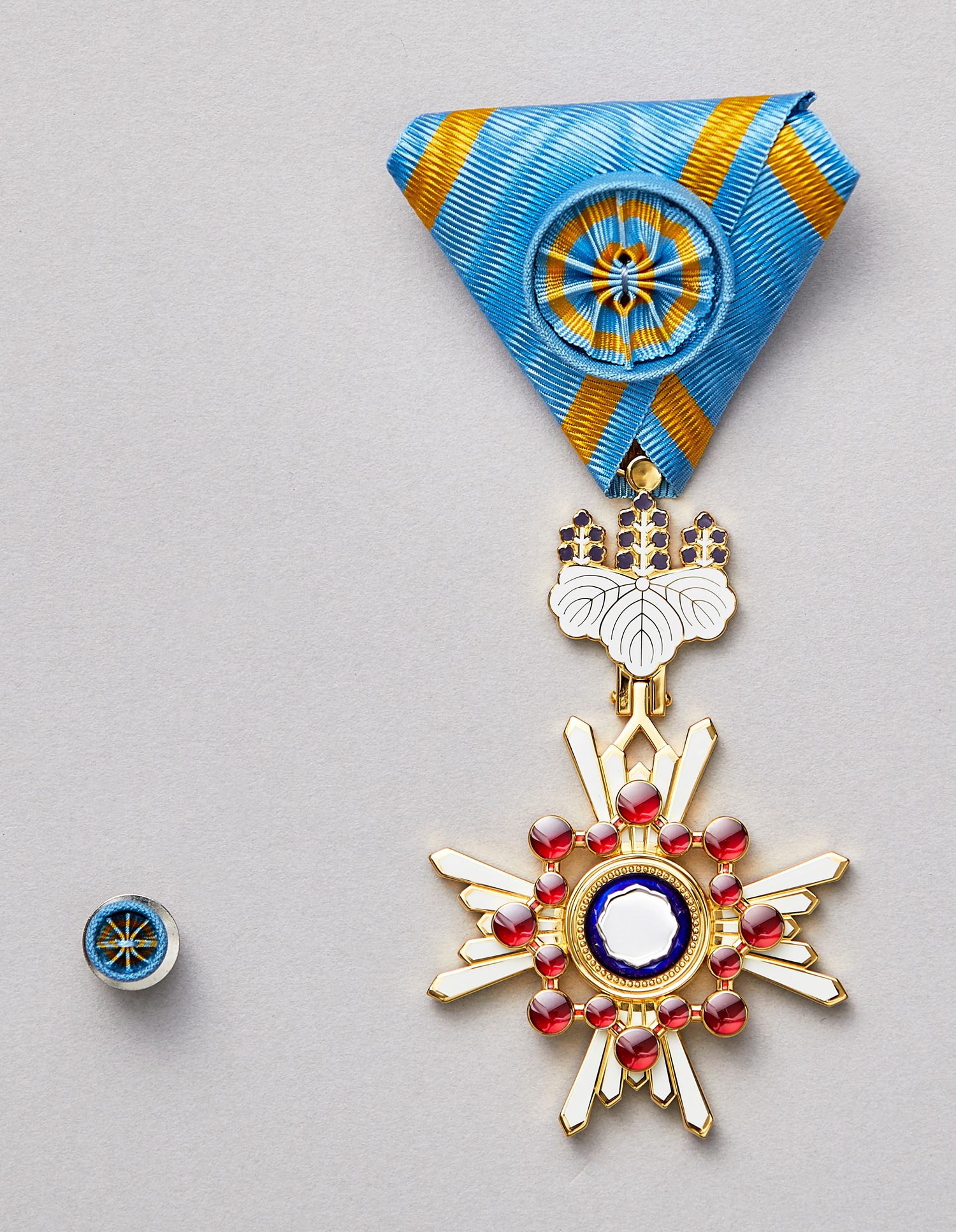
Ashida was awarded the Order of the Sacred Treasure for his contributions to Japanese culture in 1998.

Ashida was inducted into the Black Belt Hall of Fame – as well as made its instructor of the year – in 1973 and the United States Judo Federation's Hall of Fame twenty years later. As of 2025, he is the only person to have ever been both a coach and a referee for judo at the Olympic games. At some point before 1996, he was appointed as one of the American representatives of the Kodokan Judo Institute by Kanō Risei, the son of the inventor of judo Kanō Jigorō.

In 1997, Ashida was brought to the attention of the Japanese national government after he interrupted a judo championship in Kansas. When the organizers failed to follow critical protocol, Ashida stepped in to rectify the errors. Though they had not formally met Ashida, several important Japanese visitors had been spectating and described his intervention as samurai-like. In part for this event and his other contributions to Japanese culture in the United States, the following November Ashida traveled to Japan and was honored by Emperor Akihito with the Order of the Sacred Treasure, fourth class. Ashida had been nominated by the Japanese consul in Kansas City and a Japanese biochemistry professor at the University of Kansas, both of whom had been in attendance.

Ashida often introduced judo as "the gentle sport", (Note: Jūdō (柔道) literally means the 'weak way' or the 'gentle way' in Japanese. Ashida, however, variously reported that it meant either the 'art of gentlemen' or the 'gentle measure'.) since the point of the martial art was not to destroy one's opponent. Ashida viewed judo principally as a tool through which to develop self-discipline and social etiquette, viewing self-defense as a "byproduct" of the art. He did not consider it to be a good street fighting martial art, once remarking: "If you use judo in a street fight, you get killed." If talking a potential combatant out of fighting did not work, Ashida recommended running away.

== Personal life ==
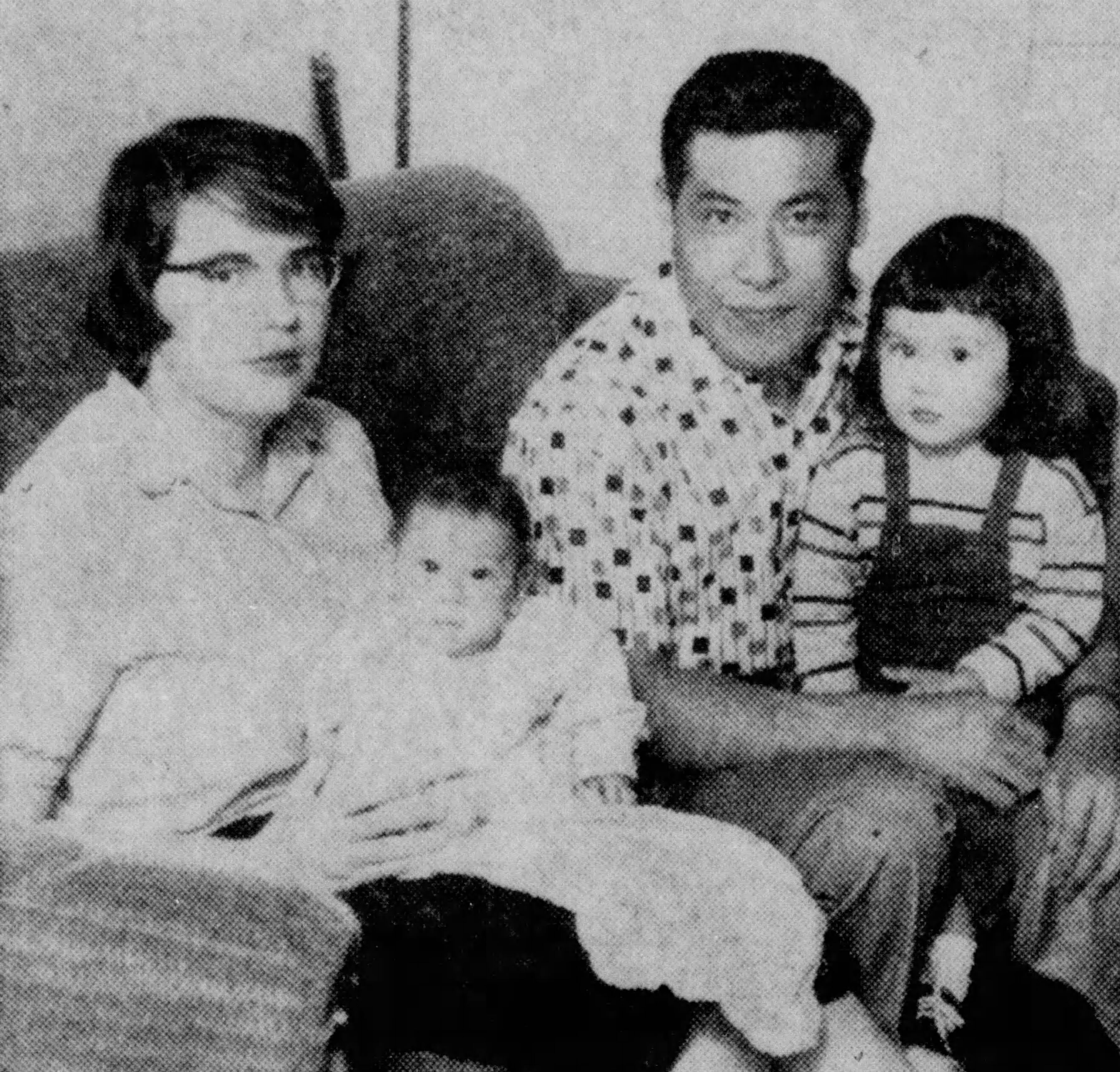
Ashida holding Margaret (right) and Ellie holding Janet in 1958

Ashida and his wife had two daughters, Margaret (1956–2014) and Janet (born 1958). Ellie was the daughter of Brigadier General John Colt Beaumont Elliot, a Silver Star–decorated military engineer who had served under Douglas MacArthur in the Pacific theater in World War II. When Ellie called to inform her father that the two were getting married, he hung up and did not speak to her for several years. After their daughters were born, however, John visited the family and ultimately he and Ashida quickly became friends. Ellie reported that her father showed up one day at their apartment in his military uniform and requested to meet Ashida. He was teaching judo to a team of United States Airmen and the men immediately jumped to attention upon seeing the general; Ashida ignored him and slammed an airman into the ground at Elliott's feet, earning his respect immediately. (Note: When these events took place is somewhat unclear. Janet reported in 2009 that her grandfather did not speak to the family for years, but in a 1998 interview with Ellie, she recounts that this event took place in 1955.)

Janet was an elementary school teacher in Brockport who later became a children's judo instructor in the town. Margaret was a STEM research administrator at the Battelle Memorial Institute and was an advocate for Asian Americans and women in STEM. Though she only took one semester of judo under her father's instruction, she credited it with saving her life during a skiing accident because he taught her how to fall safely. Ellie died on October 4, 2002.

Ashida considered judo "community service" and enjoyed fishing in his downtime. He was a lifelong and devout adherent of Zen, which he considered "essential to the Japanese culture" and consonant with the principles of judo. In a 1996 interview, Ashida described judo as "a form of Zen" that helped one to understand human nature and interpret human behavior. He once described the two with Zen being the spiritual side and judo being the physical side of self-discovery. Ashida described the meaning of life as an effort "to understand the nature of beauty, truth and goodness". He recalled that Zen helped carry him through the difficulty of the end of World War II.

Ashida did not smoke and rarely drank alcohol. He spurned marijuana and considered its usage antithetical to good preparation and dedication. When preparing for major tournaments, Ashida stated that he had "no relationship with [his] wife for maybe three months" but that she was understanding. Aside from his expertise in judo, Ashida held a black belt in karate, several forms of jiujitsu, and kendo.

== Selected works ==
- Ashida, Sachio (1963). Theoretical and Experimental Analysis of Incentive Motivation (PhD thesis). Lincoln: University of Nebraska Press.
- ——; Birch, David (1964). "The effects of incentive shift as a function of training". Psychonomic Science. 1: 201–202. doi:10.3758/BF03342864. ISSN 0033-3131.
- —— (1964). "Modification of early experience of the tendency toward gregariousness in rats". Psychonomic Science. 1: 343–344. doi:10.3758/BF03343303. ISSN 0033-3131.
- —— (1969). "The effects of deprivation and post-deprivation on the heart rate of rats". Psychonomic Science. 14 (3): 123–124. doi:10.3758/BF03332741. ISSN 0033-3131.
