= Tamba, Hyōgo =

Tamba 丹波市
- City
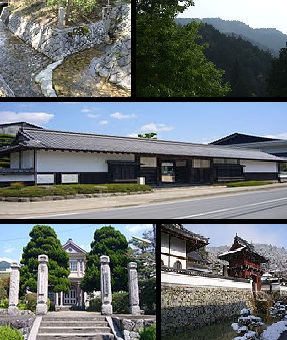
Miwakare Park	Mt Myokenzan Nishiwaki
Kaibara Jin'ya
Former Hikami-gun Upper Elementary School	Kozen-ji
- Flag Chapter

- Location of Tamba in Hyōgo Prefecture

- Location in Japan
- Coordinates: 35°11′N 135°2′E
- Country: Japan
- Region: Kansai
- Prefecture: Hyōgo
- Kaibara Town settled: April 1, 1889
- Hikami Town settled: July 23, 1955
- Both town merged and city settled: November 1, 2004

Government
  - Mayor: Tokihiko Hayashi (since December 2020)

Area
  - Total: 493.21 km^{2} (190.43 sq mi)

Population (March 31, 2022)
  - Total: 62,152
  - Density: 126.02/km^{2} (326.38/sq mi)
- Time zone: UTC+09:00 (JST)
- City hall address: 1 Kōga, Narimatsu, Hikami-chō, Tamba-shi, Hyōgo-ken 669-3692
- Climate: Cfa
- Website: www.city.tamba.hyogo.jp
- Symbols
- Flower: Erythronium japonicum
- Tree: Acer

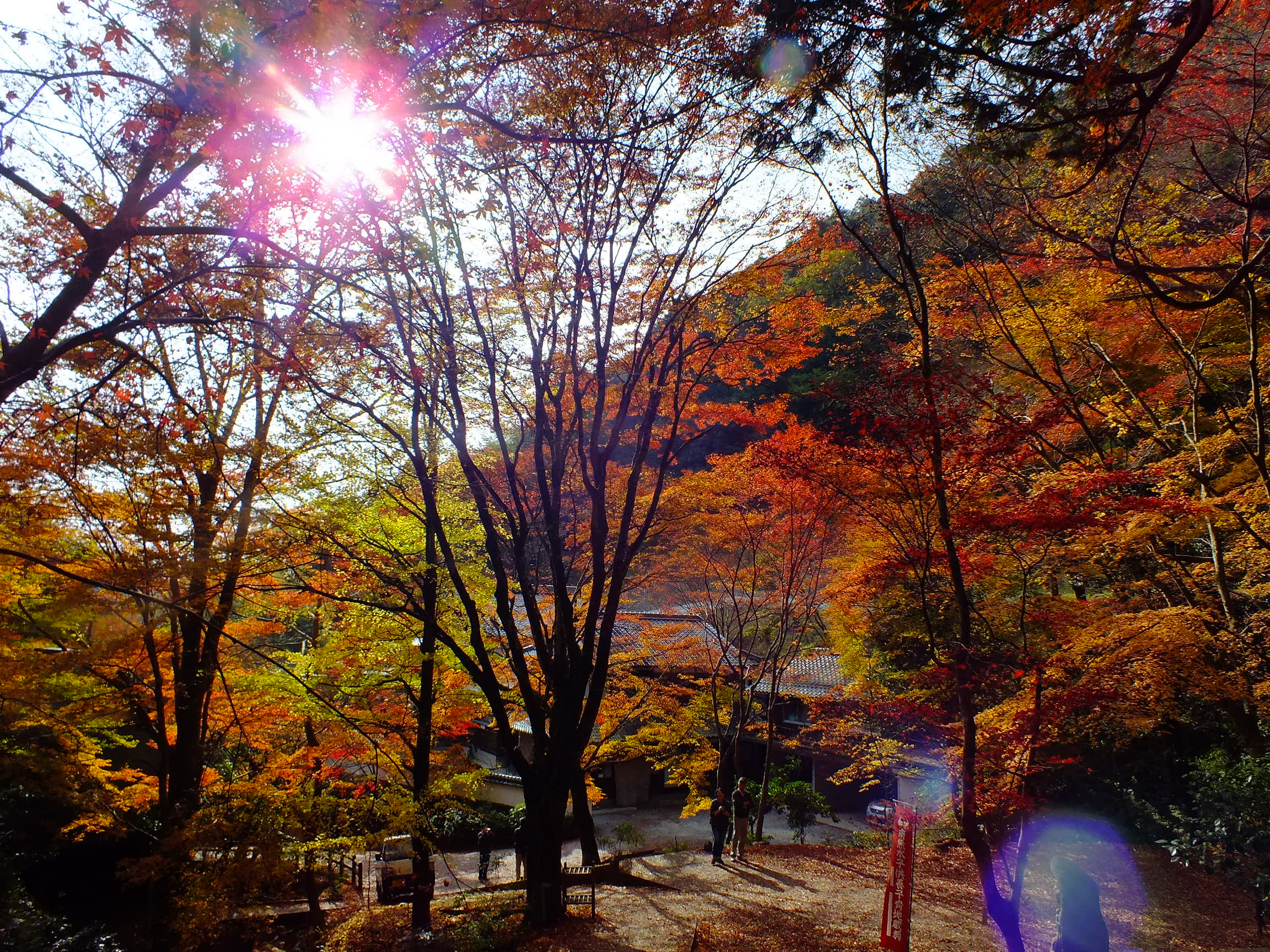
Autumn foliage at Sekigan-ji

Tamba (丹波市, Tanba-shi; Japanese pronunciation: [tä́m̀.bä̀, tä̀ḿ.bä́.ɕì, tä́ḿ.bä́-]) is a city in Hyōgo Prefecture, Japan. As of 31 March 2022, the city had an estimated population of 62,152 in 26090 households and a population density of 130 persons per km^{2}. The total area of the city is 493.21 square kilometres (190.43 sq mi).

== Geography ==
Tamba is located in an inland basin at an average elevation of 100 meters above sea level in the eastern part of the prefecture. It is located in the mountains between the Seto Inland Sea and the Sea of Japan. The uppermost stream of the Kako River system and the uppermost stream of the Yura River system, flow through the city, which has the lowest central watershed in Japan except for Hokkaido. The 35 degree east longitude meridian passes through the city.

=== Neighboring municipalities ===
Hyōgo Prefecture

- Asago
- Nishiwaki
- Taka
- Tamba-Sasayama

Kyoto Prefecture

- Fukuchiyama

=== Climate ===
Tamba has a humid subtropical climate (Köppen climate classification Cfa) with hot summers and cool to cold winters. Precipitation is significantly higher in summer than in winter, though on the whole lower than most parts of Honshū, and there is no significant snowfall. The average annual temperature in Tamba is 14.6 °C (58.3 °F). The average annual rainfall is 1,616.7 mm (63.65 in) with July as the wettest month. The temperatures are highest on average in August, at around 26.9 °C (80.4 °F), and lowest in January, at around 3.2 °C (37.8 °F). The highest temperature ever recorded in Tanba was 41.2 °C (106.2 °F) on 30 July 2025, which is also Japan's all time July record high temperature; the coldest temperature ever recorded was −6.4 °C (20.5 °F) on 1 March 1986.

Climate data for Kaibara, Tanba (1991−2020 normals, extremes 1978−present)
Month	Jan	Feb	Mar	Apr	May	Jun	Jul	Aug	Sep	Oct	Nov	Dec	Year
Record high °C (°F)	17.2 (63.0)	20.8 (69.4)	24.2 (75.6)	30.2 (86.4)	32.8 (91.0)	35.3 (95.5)	41.2 (106.2)	39.2 (102.6)	37.3 (99.1)	32.0 (89.6)	25.4 (77.7)	21.8 (71.2)	41.2 (106.2)
Mean daily maximum °C (°F)	7.9 (46.2)	8.9 (48.0)	12.9 (55.2)	19.0 (66.2)	24.1 (75.4)	27.1 (80.8)	30.8 (87.4)	32.6 (90.7)	27.9 (82.2)	22.1 (71.8)	16.3 (61.3)	10.5 (50.9)	20.0 (68.0)
Daily mean °C (°F)	3.2 (37.8)	3.8 (38.8)	7.2 (45.0)	12.8 (55.0)	18.0 (64.4)	21.8 (71.2)	25.8 (78.4)	26.9 (80.4)	22.7 (72.9)	16.5 (61.7)	10.6 (51.1)	5.4 (41.7)	14.6 (58.2)
Mean daily minimum °C (°F)	−0.7 (30.7)	−0.5 (31.1)	2.0 (35.6)	6.8 (44.2)	12.5 (54.5)	17.6 (63.7)	22.2 (72.0)	22.8 (73.0)	18.7 (65.7)	12.0 (53.6)	6.0 (42.8)	1.3 (34.3)	10.1 (50.1)
Record low °C (°F)	−7.9 (17.8)	−8.9 (16.0)	−9.9 (14.2)	−2.3 (27.9)	0.3 (32.5)	7.6 (45.7)	13.1 (55.6)	14.8 (58.6)	7.4 (45.3)	1.1 (34.0)	−2.2 (28.0)	−8.7 (16.3)	−9.9 (14.2)
Average precipitation mm (inches)	63.6 (2.50)	74.0 (2.91)	116.2 (4.57)	127.6 (5.02)	152.8 (6.02)	185.6 (7.31)	220.2 (8.67)	169.2 (6.66)	217.6 (8.57)	141.4 (5.57)	80.4 (3.17)	68.2 (2.69)	1,616.7 (63.65)
Average precipitation days (≥ 1.0 mm)	9.9	10.5	11.2	10.4	10.0	12.2	12.8	9.7	11.0	9.1	7.6	9.7	124.1
Mean monthly sunshine hours	105.0	104.2	143.0	173.0	178.3	125.4	133.1	175.4	129.1	139.9	126.6	111.3	1,644.1
Source: Japan Meteorological Agency

=== Demographics ===
Per Japanese census data, the population of Tamba in 2020 is 61,741 people. Tamba has been conducting censuses since 1920.

Historical population
Year	Pop.	±%
1920	71,361	—
1925	71,500	+0.2%
1930	72,286	+1.1%
1935	70,494	−2.5%
1940	70,276	−0.3%
1945	87,982	+25.2%
1950	87,599	−0.4%
1955	85,963	−1.9%
1960	81,648	−5.0%
1965	75,877	−7.1%
1970	72,441	−4.5%
1975	72,401	−0.1%
1980	72,982	+0.8%
1985	74,103	+1.5%
1990	73,659	−0.6%
1995	73,988	+0.4%
2000	72,862	−1.5%
2005	70,810	−2.8%
2010	67,780	−4.3%
2015	64,660	−4.6%
2020	61,741	−4.5%
Tanba population statistics

== History ==
The area of Tamba was part of ancient Tanba Province, and corresponds almost exactly with ancient Hikami District. Numerous burial mounds from the Kofun period are located in the area. During the Sengoku period, the area was dominated by Akai Naomasa, nicknamed the "Red Demon of Tanba" from his stronghold at Kuroi Castle. The area was conquered by Akechi Mitsuhide under Oda Nobunaga, but Kuroi Castle did not fall until three years after Akai's death. Under the Tokugawa shogunate, Kaibara Domain was established for a cadet branch of the Oda clan. Following the Meiji restoration, the area became part of "Toyooka Prefecture" in 1871 before merging with Hyōgo Prefecture in 1876, and being organized into various villages and towns with the establishment of the modern municipalities system on April 1, 1889. The modern city of Tamba was established on November 1, 2004, from the merger of all six towns of the former Hikami District: Aogaki, Ichijima, Kaibara, Kasuga, Sannan, and Hikami. Tamba is a very small city with Hikami as the biggest of the six original towns.

== Government ==
Tamba has a mayor-council form of government with a directly elected mayor and a unicameral city council of 20 members. Tamba contributes one member to the Hyogo Prefectural Assembly. In terms of national politics, the city is part of Hyōgo 5th district of the lower house of the Diet of Japan.

== Economy ==
Tamba has mostly a rural economy based on agriculture and forestry. The area is especially noted for its production of black soybeans.

== Education ==
Tamba has 22 public elementary schools and seven public middle schools operated by the city government and three public high schools operated by the Hyōgo Prefectural Department of Education. The prefecture also operates one special education school for the handicapped.

== Transportation ==
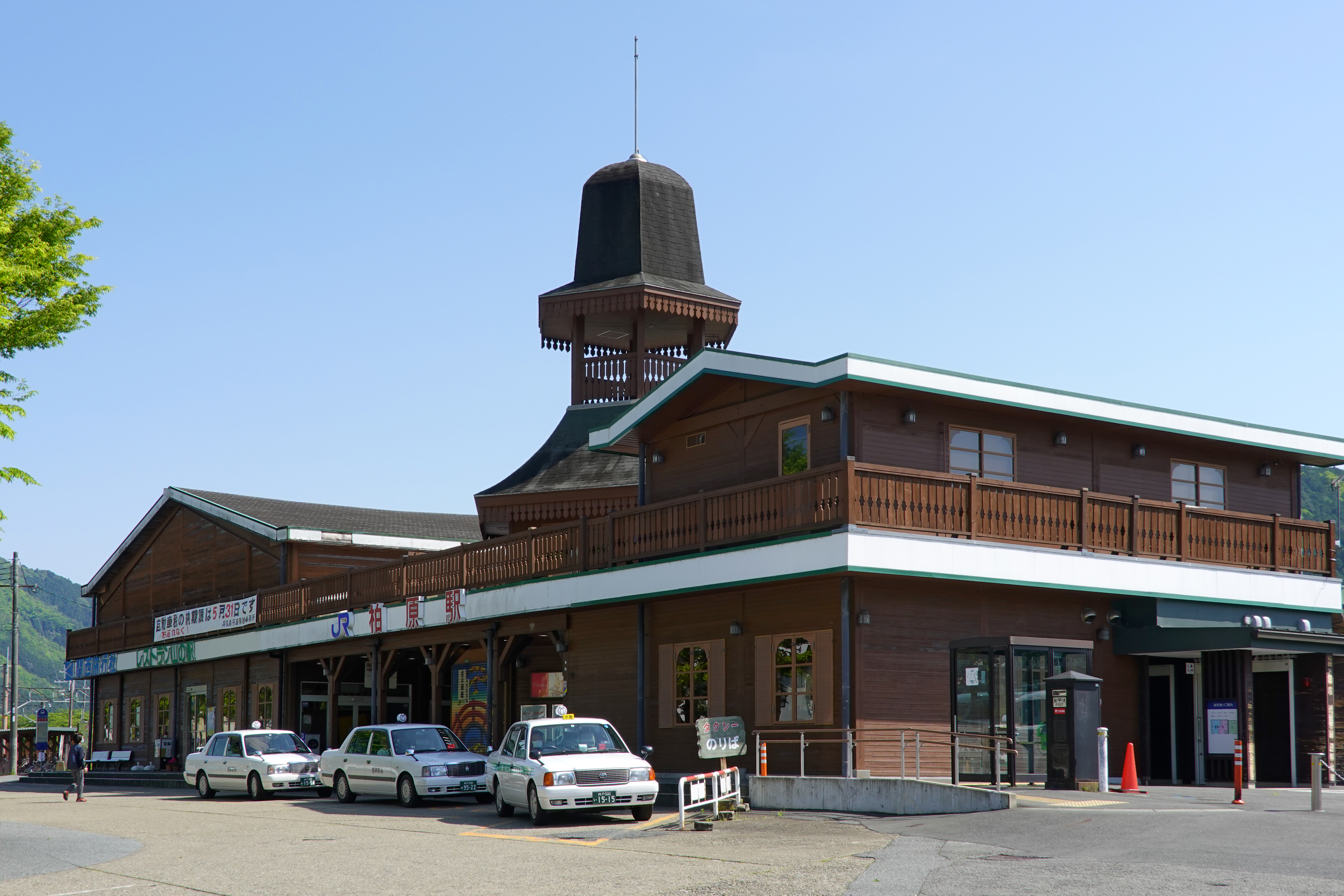
Kaibara Station

=== Railway ===
JR West – Fukuchiyama Line

- Shimotaki - Tanikawa - Kaibara - Iso - Kuroi - Ichijima - Tamba-Takeda

JR West – Kakogawa Line

- Kugemura - Tanikawa

=== Highways ===
- Maizuru-Wakasa Expressway
- National Route 175
- National Route 176
- National Route 427
- National Route 429
- National Route 483

== Sister cities ==
- Auburn, Washington, United States, friendship city since August 11, 1968
- Kent, Washington, United States, friendship city since November 24, 1969

== Local attractions ==
- Kaibara Domain Jin'ya site, National Historic Site
- Kaibara Hachiman Jinja
- Kuroi Castle ruins, National Historic Site and one of the Continued Top 100 Japanese Castles.
- Ennokyo Headquarters

== Notable people ==
- Kiichi Arita, politician and cabinet minister
- Sachio Ashida, research psychologist, judoka, and kamikaze pilot
- Lady Kasuga, wet nurse of Shogun Tokugawa Iemitsu
- Den Kenjirō, 8th Japanese Governor-General of Taiwan
- Takijirō Ōnishi, World War II IJN admiral, "the father of the kamikaze"

== Gallery ==
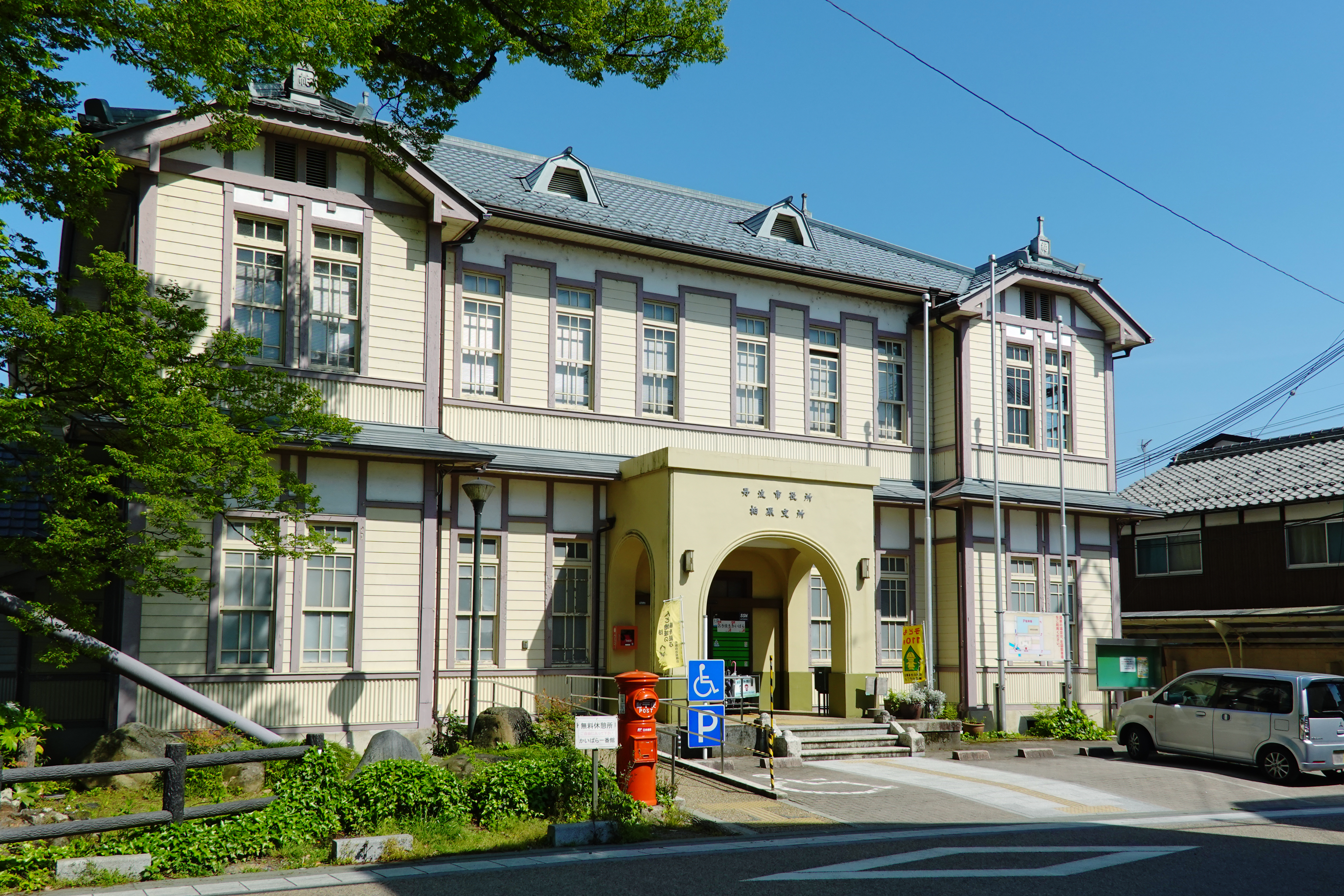
Tamba city hall Kaibara branch (former Kaibara town hall)

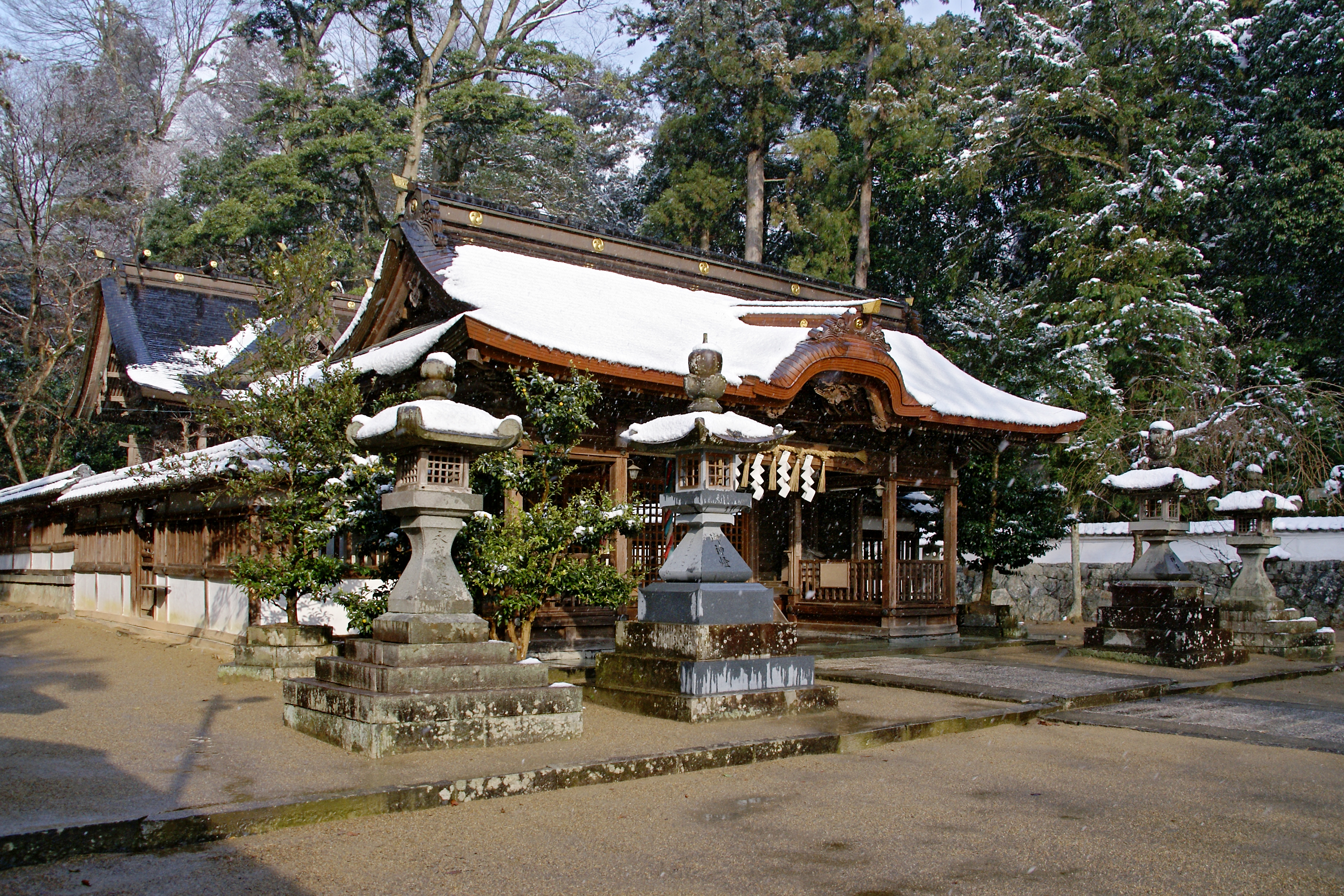
Hyozu Jinja in Tamba

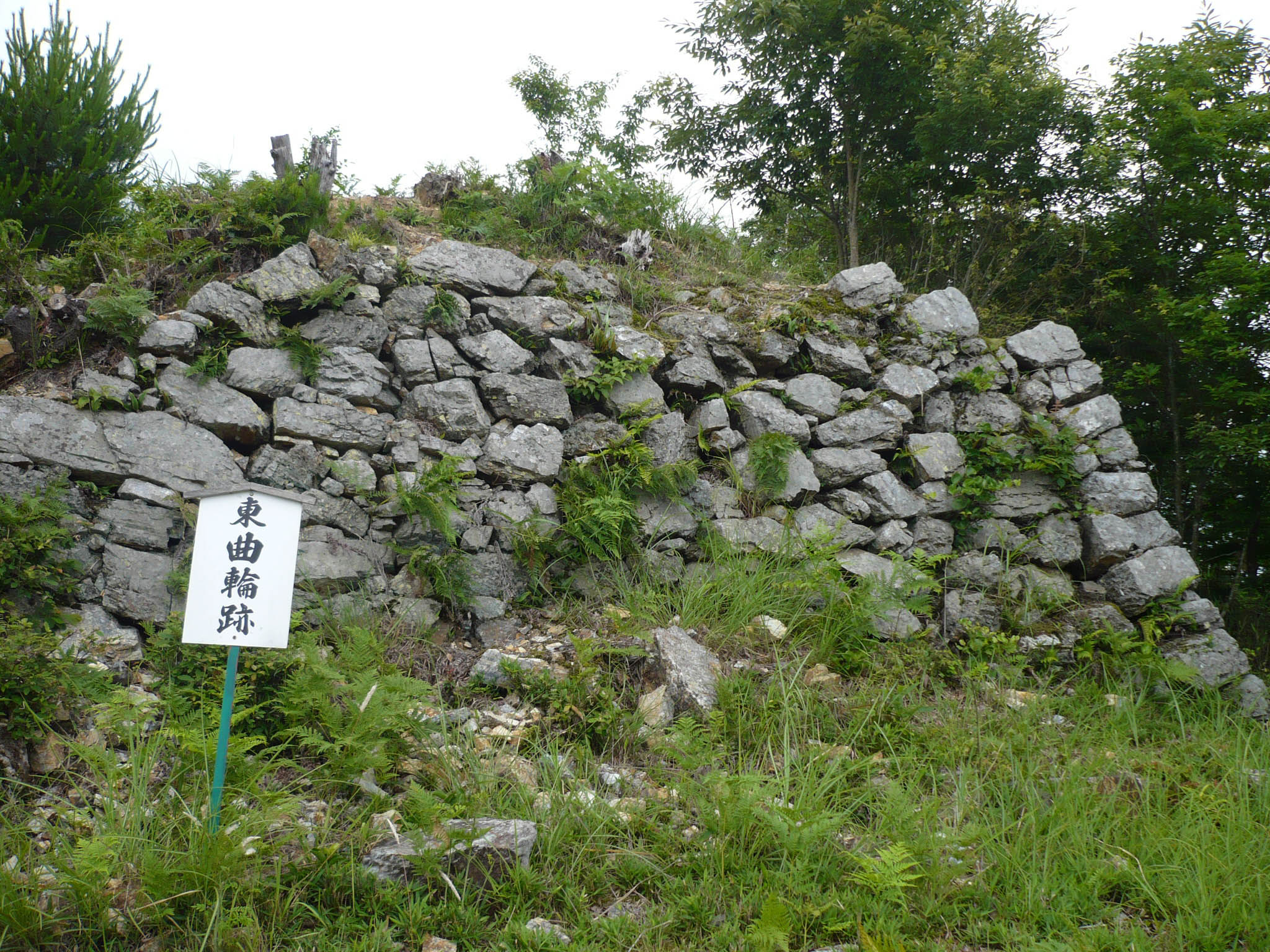
Stone wall of a Yagura Tower Kuroi Castle
