= Takijirō Ōnishi =

Imperial Japanese Navy admiral (1891–1945)

- 大西 瀧治郎
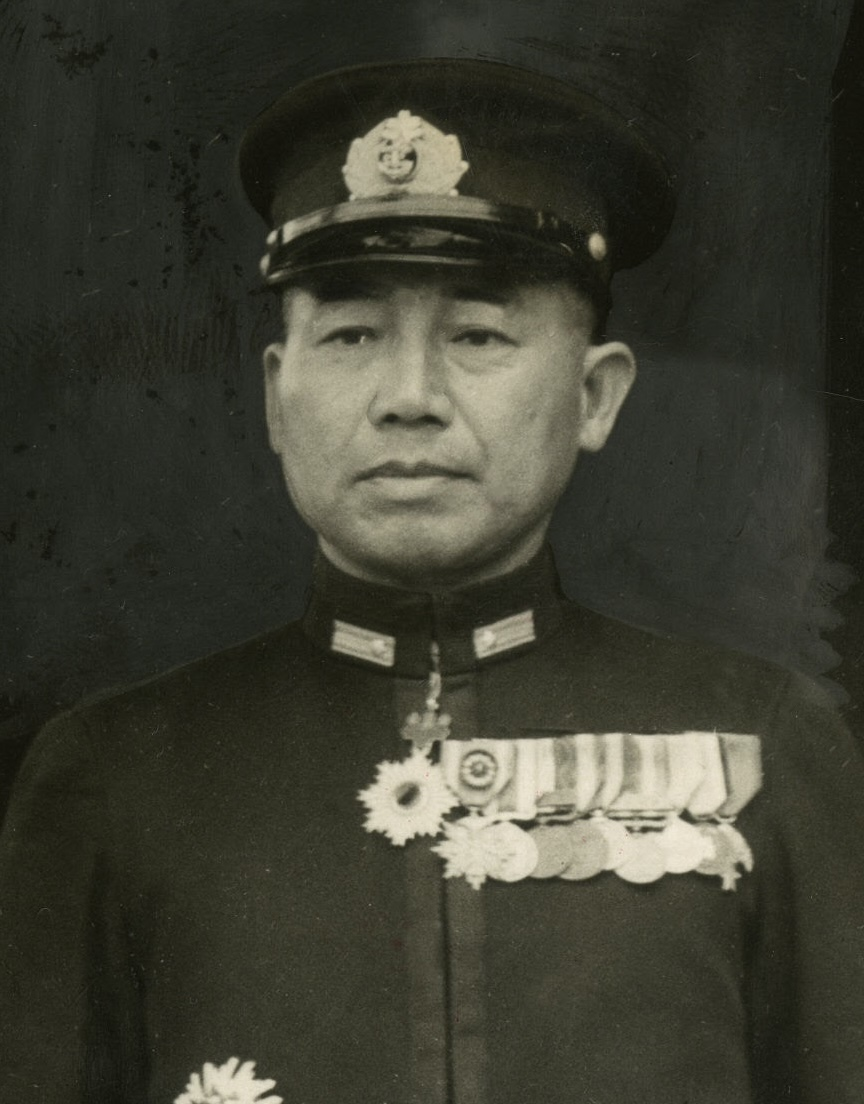
- Born: 2 June 1891; Tamba, Hyōgo, Empire of Japan
- Died: 16 August 1945 (aged 54); Tokyo, Empire of Japan
- Military career
- Allegiance: Empire of Japan
- Branch: Imperial Japanese Navy
- Service years: 1912–1945
- Rank: Vice admiral
- Commands: Sasebo Naval Air Group, 2nd Combined Air Group, 1st Combined Air Group, 1st Air Fleet, Vice-chief of Navy General Staff
- Conflicts: Second Sino-Japanese War; Bombing of Chongqing; World War II; Pacific War; Battle of Leyte Gulf

Takijirō Ōnishi (大西 瀧治郎, Ōnishi Takijirō; 2 June 1891 – 16 August 1945) was an admiral in the Imperial Japanese Navy during World War II who came to be known as the father of the kamikaze.

== Early career ==
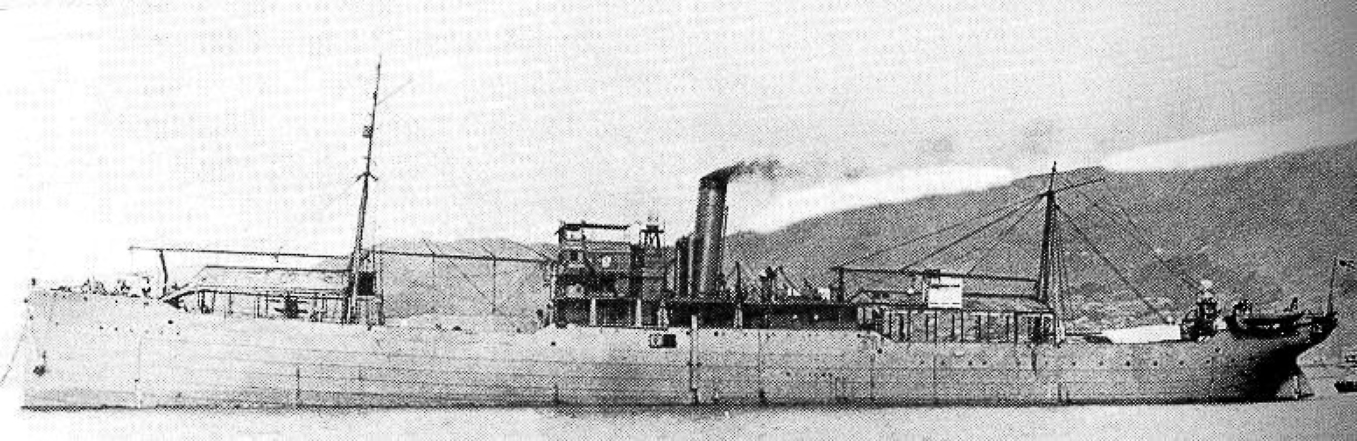
The Japanese aircraft mother ship Wakamiya, from which the world's first ship-based air raids against German positions in Tsingtau were flown

Ōnishi was a native of Ashida village (part of present-day Tamba City) in Hyōgo Prefecture. He graduated from the 40th class of the Imperial Japanese Navy Academy, ranked 20 out of a class of 144 cadets in 1912. He served his midshipman term on the cruiser Soya and battlecruiser Tsukuba and after he was commissioned an ensign, he was assigned to the battleship Kawachi.

As a sub-lieutenant, he was assigned to the seaplane tender Wakamiya, and helped develop the Imperial Japanese Navy Air Service in its early stages. He was also dispatched to England and France in 1918, to learn more about the development of combat aircraft and their use in World War I. After his return, he was promoted to lieutenant, and assigned to the Yokosuka Naval Air Group from 1918 to 1920. He continued to serve in various staff positions related to naval aviation through the 1920s, and was also a flight instructor at Kasumigaura.

After his promotion to lieutenant commander, Ōnishi was assigned to the aircraft carrier Hōshō on 10 December 1928 as commander of the carrier air wing. He became executive officer of the aircraft carrier Kaga on 15 November 1932. He was promoted to rear admiral on 15 November 1939 and chief of staff of the 11th Air Fleet.

Admiral Takijirō Ōnishi in the cockpit, wearing flight gear.

== World War II ==
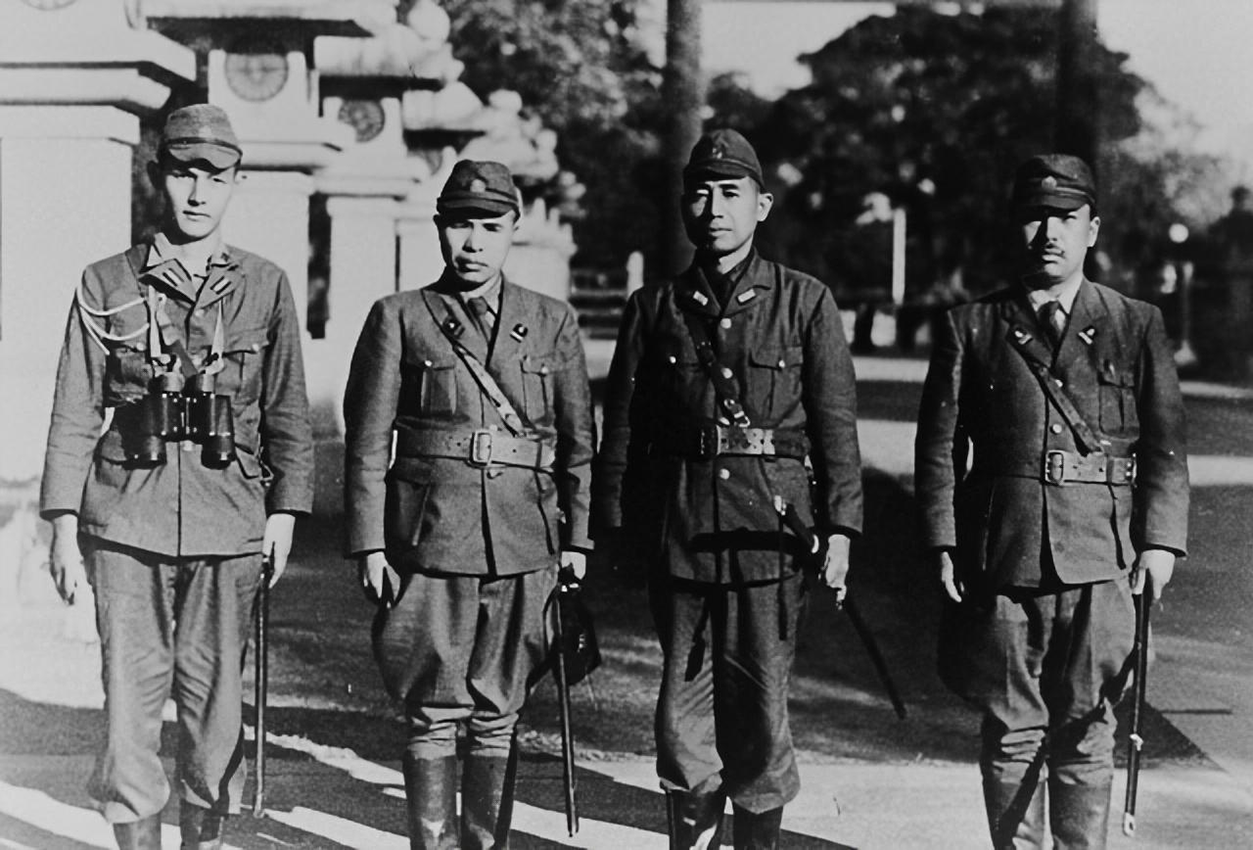
From the left, Deputy Chikanori Moji, Yoshio Kodama, and Vice Admiral Takijiro Onishi. In February 1945, at Tainan Shrine in Taiwan.

Early in the Pacific Campaign of World War II, Ōnishi was the head of the Naval Aviation Development Division in the Ministry of Munitions and was responsible for some of the technical details of the attack on Pearl Harbor in 1941 under the command of Admiral Isoroku Yamamoto. Ōnishi had opposed the attack on the grounds that it would lead to a full-scale war with a foe that had the resources to overpower Japan into an unconditional surrender. Nevertheless, his 11th Air Fleet had a critical role in the operations in attacking American forces in the Philippines from Japanese-occupied Taiwan.

On 1 May 1943, he was promoted to vice admiral. As an admiral, Ōnishi was also very interested in psychology, particularly in relation to soldier's reactions under critical circumstances. In 1938, he had published a book on the subject: War Ethics of the Imperial Navy.

After October 1944, Ōnishi became the commander of the First Air Fleet in the northern Philippines. While he is commonly credited with having devised the tactic of suicide air attacks (kamikaze) on Allied aircraft carriers, the project predated his tenure and was one that he had originally opposed as "heresy." Following the loss of the Mariana Islands, and facing orders to destroy the US Navy′s aircraft carrier fleet in advance of Operation Sho, Onishi changed his position and ordered the attacks. In a meeting at Mabalacat Airfield (known to the US military as Clark Air Base), near Manila on 19 October 1944, Ōnishi, who was visiting the 201st Navy Flying Corps headquarters, said, "In my opinion, there is only one way of assuring that our meager strength will be effective to a maximum degree. That is to organize suicide attack units composed of A6M Zero fighters armed with 250-kilogram bombs, with each plane to crash-dive into an enemy carrier.... What do you think?"

He addressed the first kamikaze unit and announced that its nobility of spirit would keep the homeland from ruin even in defeat. After his recall to Tokyo, Ōnishi became Vice Chief of the Imperial Japanese Navy General Staff on 19 May 1945.

Just before the end of the war, Ōnishi pushed for continuing the fight and said that the sacrifice of 20 million more Japanese lives would make Japan victorious.

== Death ==
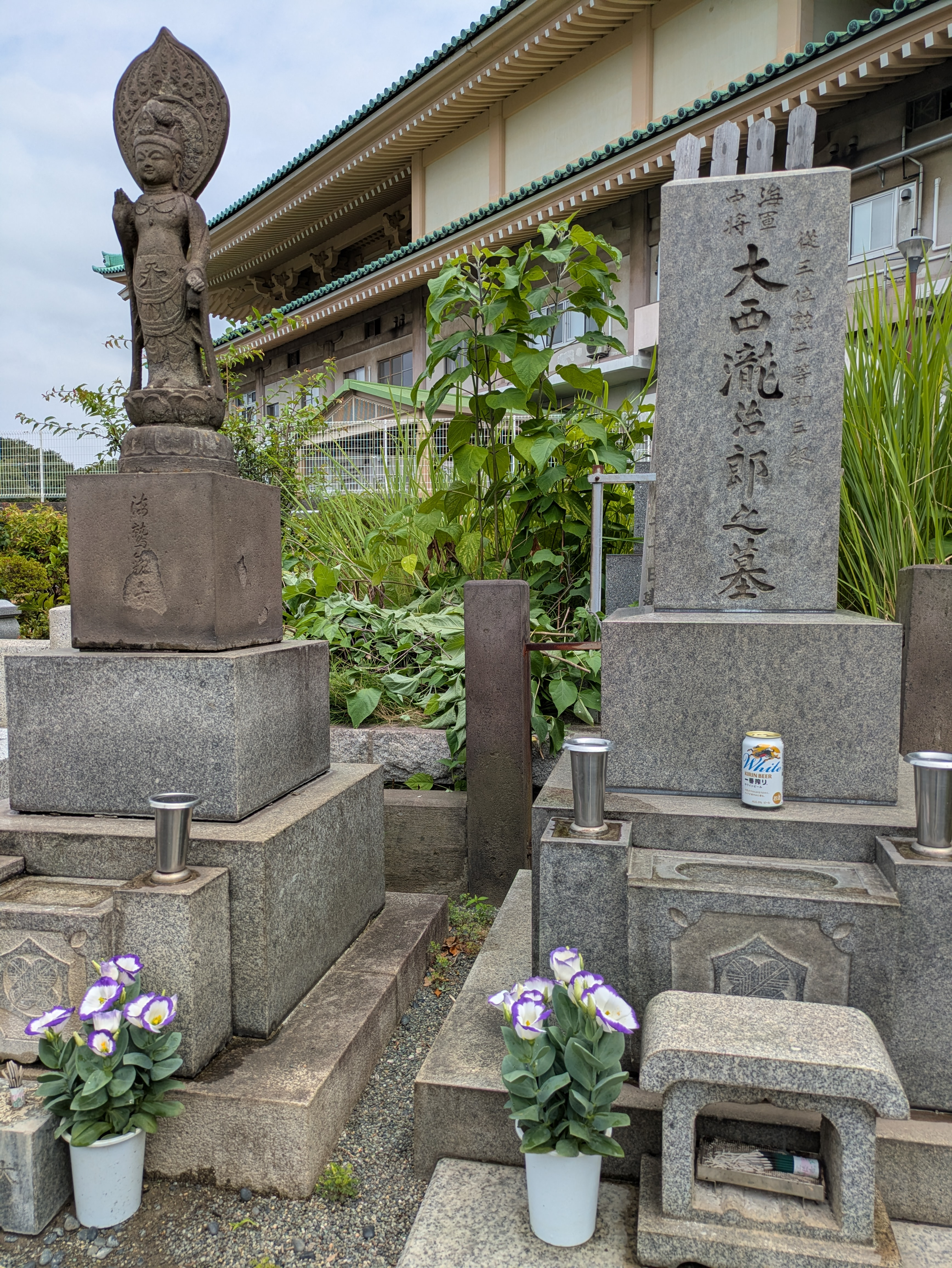
Grave of Ōnishi at Sōji-ji

Ōnishi committed ritual suicide (seppuku) in his quarters on 16 August 1945 after the unconditional surrender of Japan at the end of World War II. Yoshio Kodama was a witness, but subsequently unable to bring himself to commit seppuku. Ōnishi's suicide note apologized to the approximately 4,000 pilots he had sent to their deaths, and he urged all young civilians who had survived the war to work towards rebuilding Japan and peace among nations. He also stated that he would offer his death as a penance to the kamikaze pilots and their families. Accordingly, he did not use a kaishakunin, the usual second who executes by beheading, and so died of self-inflicted injuries over a period of 15 hours.

The sword with which Ōnishi committed suicide is kept at the Yūshūkan Museum in Yasukuni Shrine, in Tokyo. Ōnishi's ashes were divided between two graves: one at the Zen temple of Sōji-ji in Tsurumi, Yokohama, and the other at the public cemetery in the former Ashida Village in Hyōgo Prefecture.

== In film ==
- Portrayed by Hiroshi Nihonyanagi in the 1967 film Japan's Longest Day.
- The Japanese actor Tōru Abe portrayed Ōnishi in the 1970 film Tora! Tora! Tora! (uncredited).
- Ōnishi was also portrayed in the Toei 1970 production Saigo no Tokkōtai (最後の特攻隊, directed by Junya Sato), The Last Kamikaze in English.
- Toei produced a biographical film in 1974, Ā Kessen Kōkūtai (あゝ決戦航空隊, directed by Kōsaku Yamashita), Father of the Kamikaze in English.

== See also ==
- Kamikaze
