= Kin'ichi Sawaki =

Japanese poet (1919–2001)

- Born: October 6, 1919; Toyama, Japan
- Died: November 5, 2001 (aged 82); Tokyo, Japan
- Education: University of Tokyo
- Occupations: Poet, writer, university professor
- Spouse: Ayako Hosomi

Kin’ichi Sawaki (Japanese: 沢木 欣一; October 6, 1919 – November 5, 2001) was a Japanese haiku poet and essayist.

Sawaki was born in Toyama. Since his father worked as a teacher in Korea, he spent his childhood in Korea until he graduated from junior high school. He studied at the University of Tokyo. In 1946, he founded the magazine Kaze ("Wind"). He advocated for the idea of "social haiku" in the magazine. In 1966, he was appointed Professor at the Tokyo University of the Arts.

From 1987 to 1993, he was president of the Association of Haiku Poets. In 1993, he was awarded the Order of the Rising Sun, 3rd class. He also won the Dakotsu Prize in 1996.

He was married to the poet Ayako Hosomi.
