= Tomoji Ishizuka =

Japanese writer (1906–1984)

Ishizuka Tomoji
- Born: 20 September 1906; Kitakanbara District, Niigata Japan
- Died: 8 February 1984 (aged 77); Kamakura, Kanagawa, Japan
- Occupation: writer
- Writing career
- Genre: haiku poetry

Tomoji Ishizuka (石塚 友二; 20 September 1906 – 8 February 1984), known by his pen name written in different kanji (石塚 友二), was a Japanese haiku poet and novelist active during the Shōwa era.

== Early life ==
Ishizuka was born in rural Kitakanbara District, Niigata Prefecture. He moved to Tokyo in 1924, and found a job in a bookstore, while hoping to find a break into the literary world. His chance came when a friend introduced him to the famed novelist Yokomitsu Riichi, who agreed to take Ishizuka on as his disciple. However, Ishizuka was interested in poetry as well as prose, and also joined a literary circle organized by Hasegawa Reiyoshi.

== Literary career ==
In 1933, Ishizuka contributed haiku verses to the Ashibi literary magazine. Around this time, he went to work for Tenbosha Books as an editor of the essay magazine, Buntai ("Style"). In 1935, he started his own bookstore, called Sara, which enabled him to publish works by Yokomitsu Riichi and Kawabata Yasunari, and the haiku anthologies of Nakamura Kusatao and Ishida Hakyo. He co-founded the haiku magazine, Tsuru ("Crane") in 1937 together with Ishida.

In 1940, Ishizuka succeeded in publishing his own haiku anthology, Hosun Kyojitsu, which brought him to the attention of the haiku world. After the death of Ishida Hakyo in 1969, he took over full control of Tsuru. His other haiku anthologies include Iso Kaze ("Beach Wind"), Kojin ("Light Dust") and Tamanawa-sho.

In 1942, Ishizuka changed from poetry to prose, and published the novel, Matsukaze ("Pine Wind"), serialized in the magazine Bungakukai. His subsequent novels included Seishun ("Youth") and Hashi-mori ("Bridge Guard").

Ishizuka lived in Kamakura, Kanagawa prefecture from 1945 until his death in 1986 at the age of 79. In Kamakura, he was a member of the Nanboku ("North-South") literary circle organized by Atsuko Anzai and (through a recommendation by Kawabata Yasunari) was hired as an editor to the short-lived Kamakura magazine published by Kamakura Bunko.

A memorial stone with one of his haiku is at the temple of Kencho-ji, but his grave is at the Kamakura Reien cemetery.

== See also ==
- Japanese literature
- List of Japanese authors
