= Hikami District =

Former district in Hyōgo Prefecture, Japan

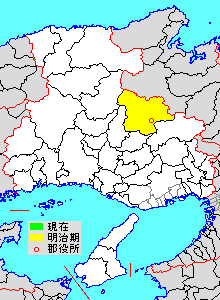
Scope of Hikami District

Hikami (氷上郡, Hikami-gun) was a district located in Hyōgo Prefecture, Japan.

As of 2003, the Hikami district had an estimated population of 71,753 and a density of 145.46 persons per km^{2}. The total area was 493.28 km^{2}.

== Former towns and villages ==
- Aogaki
- Hikami
- Ichijima
- Kaibara
- Kasuga
- Sannan

== Merger ==
On November 1, 2004, the towns of Aogaki, Hikami, Ichijima, Kaibara, Kasuga and Sannan were merged to create the city of Tamba. Hikami District was dissolved as a result of this merger.
