= Kasuga, Hyōgo =

Town in Hyōgo Prefecture, Japan

Kasuga (春日町, Kasuga-chō) was a town located in Hikami District, Hyōgo Prefecture, Japan.

As of 2003, the town had an estimated population of 12,099 and a density of 159.96 persons per km^{2}. The total area was 75.64 km^{2}.

On November 1, 2004, Kasuga, along with the towns of Hikami, Aogaki, Ichijima, Kaibara and Sannan (all from Hikami District), was merged to create the city of Tamba and no longer exists as an independent municipality.
