= Sannan, Hyōgo =

Town in Hyōgo Prefecture, Japan

Sannan (山南町, Sannan-chō) was a town located in Hikami District, Hyōgo Prefecture, Japan.

== Population ==
As of 2003, the town had an estimated population of 13,268 and a density of 135.17 persons per km^{2}. The total area was 98.16 km^{2}.

== History ==
On November 1, 2004, Sannan, along with the towns of Hikami, Aogaki, Ichijima, Kaibara and Kasuga (all from Hikami District), was merged to create the city of Tamba and no longer exists as an independent municipality.
