= Shigeko Yuki =

Japanese writer (1900–1969)

- 由起 しげ子
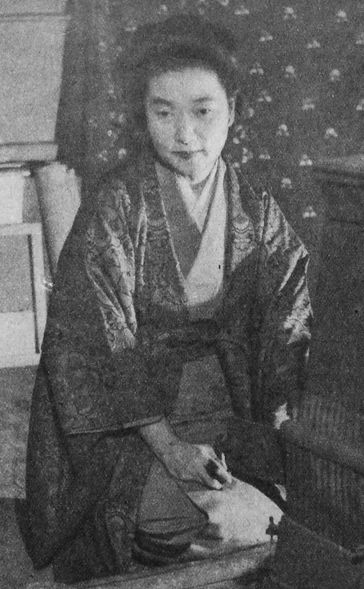
- Shigeko Yuki in 1949
- Born: Shige Shinkai; 2 December 1902; Sakai, Osaka Prefecture, Japan
- Died: 30 December 1969 (aged 67); Tokyo, Japan
- Occupation: Writer
- Spouse: Usaburo Ihara (1925–1945)
- Writing career
- Notable work: "Hon no Hanashi" (A Tale of Books)
- Notable awards: Akutagawa Prize

Shigeko Yuki (由起 しげ子, Yuki Shigeko; 2 December 1900 – 30 December 1969) was a Japanese writer and laureate of the Akutagawa Prize.

== Life ==
Yuki was born Shige Shinkai on 2 December 1900 in Sakai, Osaka Prefecture, Japan.

Her mother died when Yuki was 10 years old. In 1919, she enrolled in Kobe Women's College to study music, but dropped out due to objections from her family. Even so, she continued to study music. In 1925, she married the painter Usaburo Ihara (1894–1976), with whom she had four children. The same year, the couple moved to France, where she studied composition and piano until 1929.

In 1945, Yuki and Ihara separated. She would later write of her experience with marriage in Yasashii otto (やさしい良人, My Tender Husband). Rather than focus on the guilt of breaking up a marriage, Yuki writes about the need for independence in this work. Resisting tradition and striving for independence are narrative points shared by many of Yuki's female characters.

After her divorce, Yuki began writing children's literature to earn her living. The editor in chief of the magazine Sakuhin (作品), Eiji Yagioka, encouraged her to write novels. With her short story Hon no hanashi (本の話, A Tale of Books), Yuki (together with Tsuyoshi Kotani) became the winner of the first postwar Akutagawa Prize in 1949. Hon no hanashi tells of a woman who tries to sell her deceased brother-in-law's books to pay for his widow's medical bills. During this time, Yuki was incorrectly diagnosed with tuberculosis, which made her feel that her life had no purpose, until the diagnosis was corrected three years later.

Yuki's favourite books included the Japanese translation of Life and Love of the Insect (1911) by Jean-Henri Fabre, as well as the thesis on Kansoku no riron (A Theory of Observation) by Hideki Yukawa. The latter motivated Yuki to enroll in a course on theoretical physics at Rikkyo University in 1954.

In 1955, Yuki's novel Jochūkko (女中ッ子, Au Pair) was made into a film by Tomotaka Tasaka. In addition to adaptations of her own work by Tasaka and Yūzō Kawashima, she co-wrote the screenplay for Heinosuke Gosho's Elegy of the North and worked on the dialogue for Gosho's Yellow Crow.

Yuki died on 30 December 1969 of diabetes and pyaemia.

== Selected works ==
- Yagurumasō (Forest Carnations), 1947
- Hon no hanashi (本の話, A Tale of Books), 1949
- Kokubetsu (Farewell), 1951
- Yubiwa no hanashi (The Tale of a Ring), 1951
- Jochūkko (女中ッ子, Au Pair), 1951
- Fuyu no ki (Bushes in Winter), 1953
- Hyōhakku (Wandering), 1954
- Akasaka no kyōdai (赤坂の姉妹, The Akasaka Sisters), 1960
- Keiyaku kekkon (契約結婚, Marriage by Contract), 1961
- Yasashii otto (やさしい良人, My Tender Husband), 1963

== Bibliography ==
- Yuki, Shigeko (2005). "本の話 (Hon no hanashi)". In Kida, Jun'ichirō (ed.). 書物愛 (Shomotsu ai). Tokyo: Shōbunsha. pp. 63–108.
