= Ichijima, Hyōgo =

Town in Hyōgo Prefecture, Japan

Ichijima (市島町, Ichijima-chō) was a town located in Hikami District, Hyōgo Prefecture, Japan.

As of 2003, the town had an estimated population of 10,068 and a density of 130.50 persons per km^{2}. The total area was 77.15 km^{2}.

On November 1, 2004, Ichijima, along with the towns of Hikami, Aogaki, Kaibara, Kasuga and Sannan (all from Hikami District), was merged to create the city of Tamba and no longer exists as an independent municipality.
