= Hikami, Hyōgo =

Town in Hyōgo Prefecture, Japan

Hikami (氷上町, Hikami-chō) was a town located in Hikami District, Hyōgo Prefecture, Japan.

As of 2003, the town had an estimated population of 19,052 and a density of 172.98 persons per km^{2}. The total area was 110.14 km^{2}.

On November 1, 2004, Hikami, along with the towns of Aogaki, Ichijima, Kaibara, Kasuga and Sannan (all from Hikami District), was merged to create the city of Tamba and no longer exists as an independent municipality.
