= Dakotsu Prize =

Haiku award

The Dakotsu Prize is a haiku award established in honor of the haiku poet Dakotsu Iida. It is awarded to the best collection of haiku published between January and December of the previous year. It is considered the most prestigious award in the haiku world. It is sponsored by the Kadokawa Culture Promotion Foundation, and the first award was held in 1967. The winner is awarded a certificate, a commemorative gift, and a monetary prize.

The award ceremony is held every June, together with the Teiku Award, a tanka award.

Previously, the nominees were not made public, but from the 47th award in 2013, the final candidates have been announced in advance.

== Past winners ==
- 1979: Ayako Hosomi
- 1987: Sumio Mori
- 1990: Haruki Kadokawa
- 1996: Kin'ichi Sawaki
- 2001: Kiyoko Uda
- 2002: Tōta Kaneko
- 2011: Momoko Kuroda
- 2017: Mutsuo Takahashi
- 2018: Akito Arima
