= Kaibara, Hyōgo =

Town in Hyōgo Prefecture, Japan

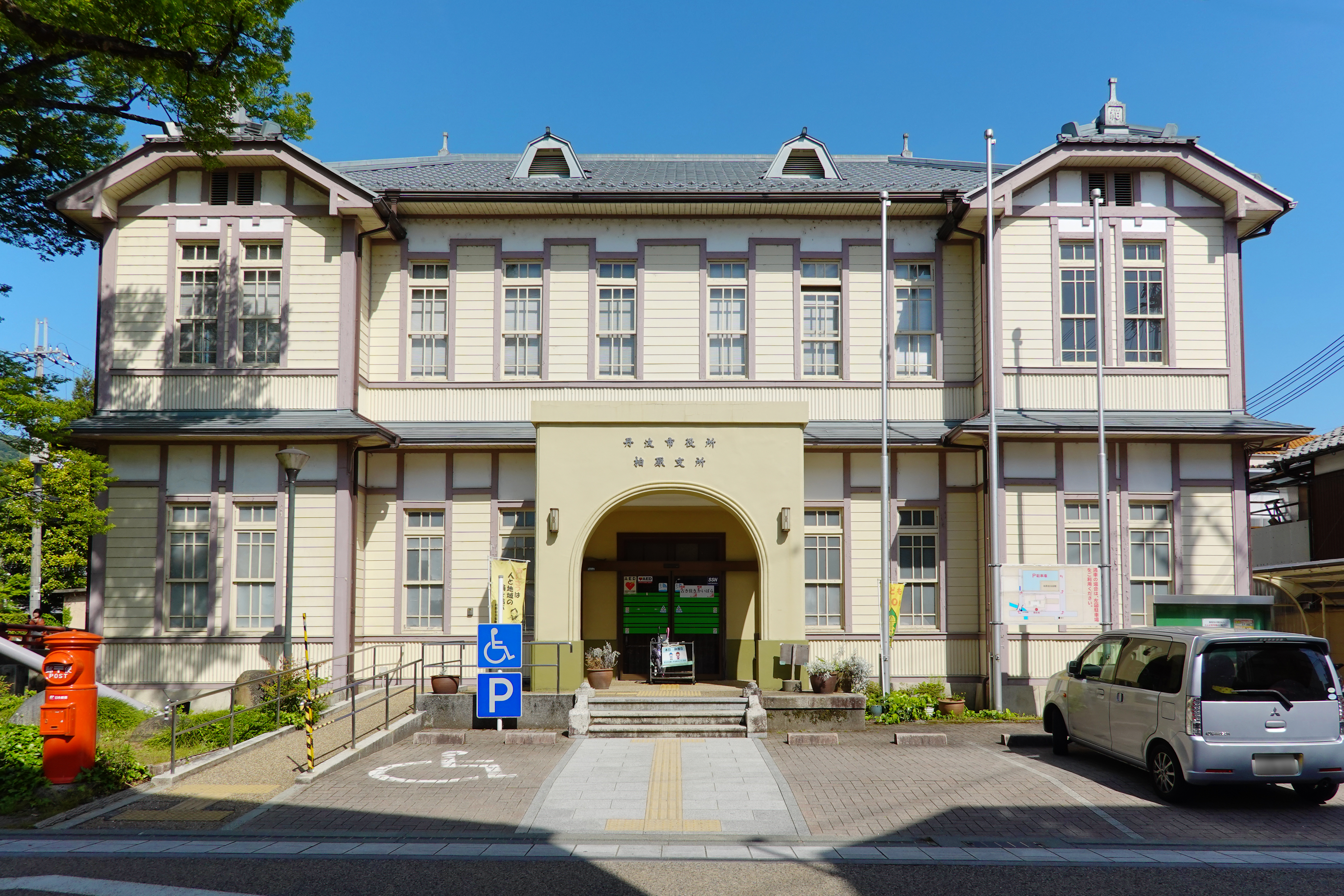
Former Kaibara Town Office

Kaibara (柏原町, Kaibara-chō) was a town located in Hikami District, Hyōgo Prefecture, Japan.

As of 2003, the town had an estimated population of 10,105 and a density of 312.56 persons per km^{2}. The total area was 32.33 km^{2}.

On November 1, 2004, Kaibara, along with the towns of Hikami, Aogaki, Ichijima, Kasuga and Sannan (all from Hikami District), was merged to create the city of Tamba and no longer exists as an independent municipality.
