= Aogaki, Hyōgo =

Town in Hyōgo Prefecture, Japan

Aogaki (青垣町, Aogaki-chō) was a town located in Hikami District, Hyōgo Prefecture, Japan.

As of 2003, the town had an estimated population of 7,161 and a density of 71.71 persons per km^{2}. The total area was 99.86 km^{2}.

On November 1, 2004, Aogaki, along with the towns of Hikami, Ichijima, Kaibara, Kasuga and Sannan (all from Hikami District), was merged to create the city of Tamba and no longer exists as an independent municipality.
