= Sumio Mori =

Japanese poet

Sumio Mori (森 澄雄, Mori Sumio; 28 February 1919 in Nagasaki – 18 August 2010 in Tokyo) was a Japanese poet noted for haiku. He had an interest in the haikai tradition of pre-modern times. He won the Yomiuri Prize for poetry in 1977 and the Dakotsu Prize in 1987.
