= Saitō Sanki =

Japanese poet and writer

- 西東三鬼
- Born: May 15, 1900
- Died: April 1, 1962
- Occupation: Writer

Saitō Sanki (西東三鬼; May 15, 1900 – April 1, 1962) was a Japanese haiku poet.

== Early life and career ==
Saitō Sanki was born Saitō Keichoku on May 15, 1900, in Tsuyama, Okayama Prefecture, in western Honshu. His father was a school superintendent and amateur artist, poet, and calligrapher, and his mother was the daughter of a samurai retainer. His parents died when he was six and eighteen, respectively, and care of the family fell to his brother Takeo, who was twenty years older.

Saitō attended the Methodist school Aoyama Gakuin, but dropped out intending to become a painter. Bowing to family obligation to pursue a more practical career, Saitō graduated from Nippon Dental College in 1925. Along the way he took up riding and earned a dancing teacher's license. Both before and after his marriage, he took a number of lovers and generally lived licentiously.

Takeo invited his brother and new wife to British Singapore, where Takeo was a manager of the NYK Line. Takeo bought a building for Saitō to use for his dental practice, but Saitō converted a room of the office into a ballroom and often closed the practice to play golf. Saitō thrived in the cosmopolitan Singapore, but bankruptcy, a case of typhoid fever, and rising anti-Japanese sentiment forced the Saitōs to return to Japan in 1929.

== Poetry ==
After another failed dental practice in Japan, Saitō became head of dentistry at a hospital in Soto Kanda, Tokyo. A colleague there, a urologist, had been collecting haiku from patients who had written them during their lengthy treatments for sexually transmitted infections, intending to publish them in a mimeographed edition. He invited Saitō to contribute. Saitō was initially uninterested, thinking haiku "old-fashioned stuff", but he gave way to the repeated entireties and began to compose his own poems. Saitō later wrote "This is the way fate caught up with me, with venereal disease as its emissary." He took as his pen name "Sanki", which means "three demons".

Despite starting at an uncharacteristically late age and eschewing any kind of mentorship or apprenticeship to a more experienced writer, Saitō quickly became a leading haiku poet. His first professionally published haiku appeared in 1933 in Somato ("Revolving Lantern"), when he was thirty-three. He joined Kyōdai Haiku, a Kyoto University campus publication, and transformed it into a leading haiku periodical.

A bout of tuberculosis prompted Saitō to reassess his priorities, and he abandoned dentistry to devote his life to haiku, paying the bills with a desk job at a company owned by mountaineer Mita Yukio (1900-1989), a friend from Singapore. His haiku was nihilistic and cynical, freely abandoning established rules, and his work was popular and acclaimed. He published his first haiku collection, Flag, in 1940.

Unfortunately, with an ultranationalist wartime government bent on repressing any hint of dissent, Saitō and other Kyōdai Haiku were arrested by the secret police in 1940. Saitō was imprisoned for over two months and upon release, forbidden to write.

== Kobe ==
In 1942, Saitō permanently left his wife and teenage son in Tokyo and moved to the port city of Kobe. At first he lived in an old hotel filled with foreigners and bargirls, but as World War II dragged on, fear of air raids prompted him to rent a large, crumbling rural house that was later dubbed the "Sanki Mansion." His interactions with colorful characters, sailors and soldiers on all sides of the conflict, and the black market for everyday necessities were chronicled in a series of stories that he published in the magazines Haiku and Tenrō in the 1950s. They were collected and translated into English as The Kobe Hotel.

== Postwar ==
In 1948, Saitō was again working as a hospital dentist and lived in Neyagawa, Osaka. Again near bankruptcy, he took an offer from the Kadokawa Corporation to edit the monthly magazine Haiku and moved to Tokyo in 1954. He published three more haiku collections: Night Peaches (1948), Today (1951), and Transfiguration (1962). He married again, to Hotta Kikue, but characteristically had several dozen affairs.

In late 1961, Saitō had an operation for stomach cancer. He died the next year, on April 1, 1962.
