= Tōta Kaneko =

Japanese writer (1919–2018)

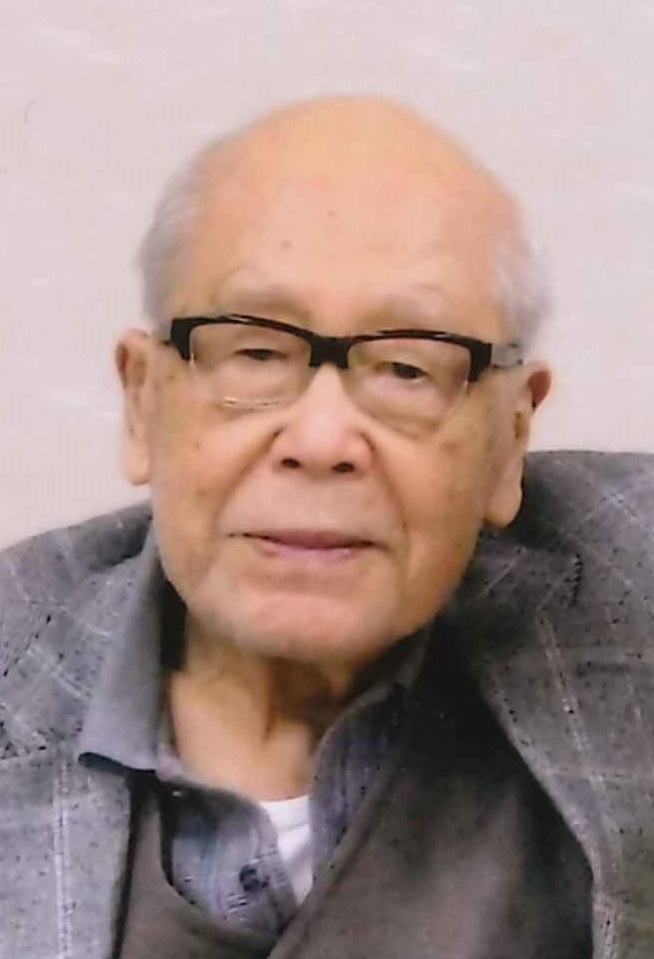
- Tōta Kaneko, 2015
- Born: September 23, 1919; Chichibu, Saitama, Japan
- Died: February 20, 2018 (aged 98); Kumagaya, Saitama, Japan
- Education: University of Tokyo
- Writing career
- Language: Japanese

Tōta Kaneko (金子 兜太, Kaneko Tōta), (September 23, 1919 – February 20, 2018) was a Japanese writer.

Kaneko was born in Chichibu. He studied at the University of Tokyo and worked for the Bank of Japan.

Kaneko died in Kumagaya on February 20, 2018, of Acute respiratory distress syndrome in Kumagaya, Saitama at the age of 98.

== Prizes ==
- 2002: Dakotsu Prize
- 2005: Cikada Prize
- 2008: Person of Cultural Merit
- 2010: Kikuchi Kan Prize
- 2015: Asahi Prize

== Bibliography ==
- Kaneko Tohta: With Notes and Commentary Part 2: 1961-2012: Selected Haiku, Parte 2;Partes 1961-2012, ISBN 978-1-936-84821-8
- Kaneko Tohta. In: World Kigu Database - Introducing Haiku Poets, Famous People, Places and Haiku Topics.
- Kaneko Tōta. In: J. Thomas Rimer, Van C. Gessel: The Columbia Anthology of Modern Japanese Literature: From 1945 to the present. Columbia University Press, 2007, ISBN 978-0-231-13804-8, p. 444.
- William J. Higginson, Penny Harter: The Haiku Handbook: How to Write, Share, and Teach Haiku. Kodansha International, 1989, ISBN 4-7700-1430-9, p.|41–42.
