= Sumio Watanabe =

Japanese mathematician

- Born: 31 March 1959 (age 67); Nakano, Nagano, Japan
- Education: Kyoto University (M.S., 1984); Tokyo Institute of Technology (Ph.D., 1993)
- Known for: Watanabe-Akaike information criterion singular statistical models
- Awards: Ichimura Prize for Science (2006)
- Scientific career
- Fields: Mathematics
- Workplaces: Tokyo Institute of Technology; Gifu University

Sumio Watanabe (渡辺 澄夫, Watanabe Sumio; born 1959) is a Japanese mathematician and engineer working in probability theory, applied algebraic geometry and Bayesian statistics. He is currently a professor at Tokyo Institute of Technology in the Department of Computational Intelligence and Systems Science. He is the author of the text, Algebraic Geometry and Statistical Learning Theory, which proposes a generalization of Fisher's regular statistical theory to singular statistical models.

== Books ==
- Mathematical Theory of Bayesian Statistics, CRC Press, 2018, ISBN 9781482238068
- Algebraic Geometry and Statistical Learning Theory, Cambridge University Press, 2009.
