= Sumio Harada =

Japanese wildlife photographer (born 1960)

Sumio Harada (born 1960) is a Japanese wildlife photographer, author, public speaker, and conservationist.

== Early life ==
Harada was born in 1960 in Japan. His interest in photography began when he joined his high school's photography club at the age of 16. Harada attended the Tokyo University of Agriculture where he studied biology. It was during this period of time when Harada began photographing the serow, a distant relative of mountain goats.

== Personal life ==
In 1994, Harada relocated to West Glacier, Montana with his wife Kumi and daughter Moyu. In 2005, Harada was granted U.S. permanent resident status. Today, Harada lives in Coram, MT with his wife Kumi.

== Career ==
In 1987, Harada began photographing mountain goats in the Canadian Rockies. In 1994, he relocated to Northwest Montana to focus on photographing mountain goats inside Glacier National Park.

In 1995, his work was first widely circulated when his photographs were published in an issue of National Geographic.

In 2008, Harada published his first wildlife photography book Mountain Goats of Glacier National Park which documents the seasonal change of mountain goats.

In 2009, he published his first DVD titled The Breaths of Glacier, which showcases the 4 seasons throughout Glacier National Park.

In 2016, he published his latest book Wild Harmony of Glacier National Park which took 8 years to create and focuses on the unique ecosystem that mountain goats belong to.

Harada has more recently decided to shoot videos in order to document the entire life cycle of mountain goats in Glacier National Park. Outside of his books, his images have been published in National Wildlife, Geo, Canadian Wildlife, Ranger Rick, Montana Magazine, and National Geographic.

== See also ==
- Nature photography
- Conservation photography
