= Nakamura Kusatao =

Japanese poet and writer

Nakamura Kusatao (中村 草田男; July 27, 1901 – August 5, 1983) was a Japanese haiku poet.

Nakamura was born on July 27, 1901, in Amoy, Fujian Province, China, the son of a Japanese diplomat. A few years later his mother brought him to Japan, where he was educated in various schools in Matsuyama and Tokyo. One of those schools was Seinan Elementary School (港区立青南小学校) in Tokyo. When returning to that school twenty years later, he wrote perhaps his most famous haiku, reflecting on the falling snow and the passing of the Meiji era:

降る雪や
明治は遠く
なりにけり

Furu Yuki ya
Meiji wa Tōku
Narinikeri

Falling snow...
Long has it now gone:
the Meiji era

In 1977, the haiku was inscribed on a stone monument at the school unveiled by Nakamura. In 1925, he attended Tokyo University to study German literature, compelled by the works of Nietzsche, Hölderlin, Chekhov, Dostoevsky, and Strindberg. Following his father's death, he suffered a nervous breakdown in 1927 and turned to poetry, particularly the tanka of Saitō Mokichi. Eventually, he returned to Tokyo University, changing his major to Japanese literature and writing his bachelor's thesis on the poet Shiki Masakoa. He finally graduated in 1933. Following graduation, he taught at the Seiki Gakuen until 1967.

At Tokyo University, he joined the Tokyo University Haiku Society. In 1929, he met Kyoshi Takahama, the doyen of the conservative haiku school centered on the magazine Hototogisu. He joined the school and met other leading poets like Takashi Matsumoto and Kawabata Bōsha. He submitted haiku to Hototogisu and published his first collection, Chōshi (長子; "The Eldest Son"), in 1936. Like many other poets, he eventually broke with Hototogisu and started his own magazine, Banryoku (萬緑; "Myriad Green Leaves"), in 1946. He was the first president of the Association of Haiku Poets.

Nakamura was a leading figure in a humanist approach to poetry referred to as ningen tankyūha (人間探求派). His verse was also noted for its ambiguity and obscurity. He went on to write over a half dozen haiku collections, several volumes of essays and criticism, and short stories he referred to as märchen.
