= Yasuko Harada =

Japanese novelist

- 原田康子
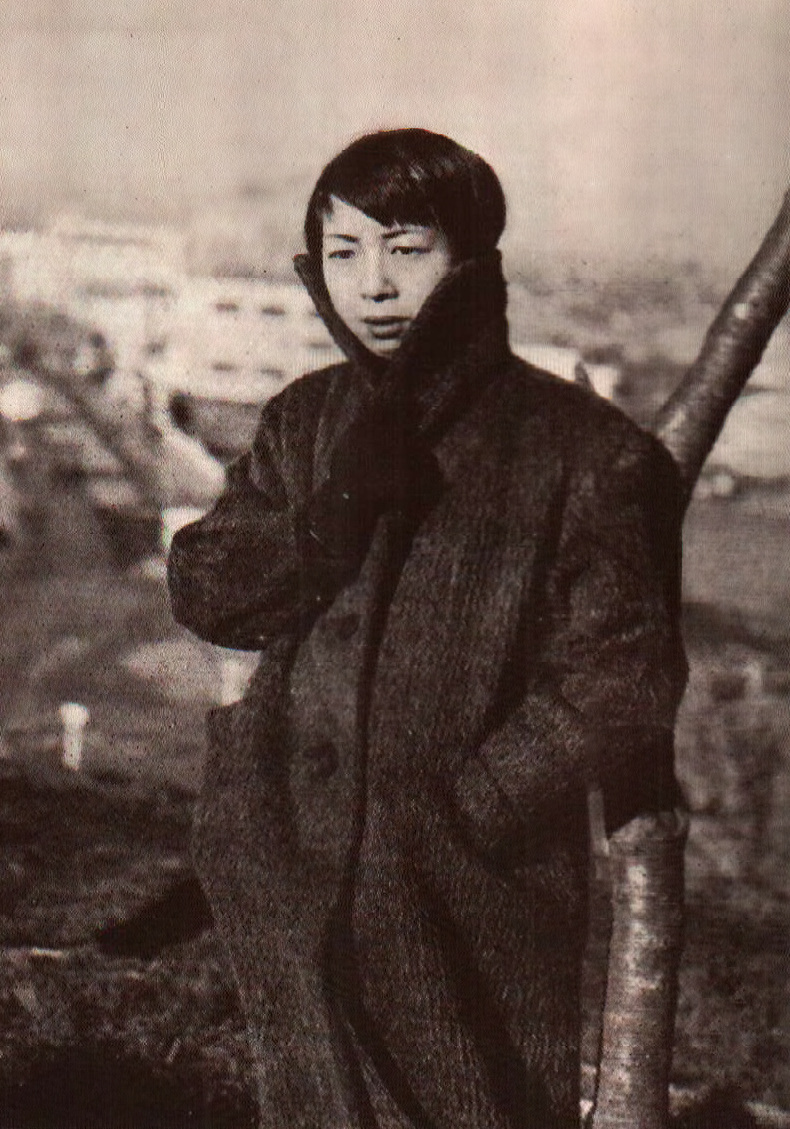
- Pronunciation: ja
- Born: January 12, 1928; Tokyo
- Died: October 20, 2009 (aged 81); Sapporo
- Occupation: Novelist
- Notable work: Sabita no kioku (1954); Banka (1956)

Yasuko Harada (原田康子) (January 12, 1928 – October 20, 2009) was a Japanese novelist.

== Early life and education ==
Harada was born on January 12, 1928, in Tokyo. She and her family moved to Kushiro, Hokkaido when she was a year old for her father's job. After getting tuberculosis as a child, she had many health problems, including nephritis. She read a lot while she was ill in bed, especially fairy tales from foreign countries. She began writing her own fairy tales during World War II. Toward the end of the war she had to work in a factory as part of the National Mobilization Law. She hated it. After the war, Harada worked as a reporter for the Kushiro newspaper. She married Yoshio Sasaki in 1951.

== Career ==
Harada's first books were serialized in magazines while she worked as a reporter. Her first published story, "Fuyu no ame", was published in 1949 in the Hokkaido Bungaku magazine. In 1954, her short story "Sabita no kioku" was praised by Shinchō as one of the best short stories of the year, but ultimately did not win their literary prize. Her novel Banka (novel) won a Women's Literature Prize, and was her only bestseller. It was made into a film that was directed by Heinosuke Gosho. Her 1999 novel, Wax Tears (蝋涙) also won the Women's Literature Prize. Her 2003 book, Kaimu (海霧), won the Yoshikawa Eiji Award

Harada died of pneumonia in Sapporo on October 20, 2009.

== Style ==
Harada's works were popular with young women in their twenties and thirties. Harada's books are usually about sensitive young women who suffer from various ailments. Her protagonists often long for the kind of love where they can feel protected and understood, but still have freedom and self-determination. Many of her books take place in her native Hokkaido.

Harada's style has been compared to Françoise Sagan.

== Selected bibliography ==
=== Short stories ===
- Fuyu no ame (冬の雨), 1949
- Sabita no kioku (サビタの記憶), 1954
- Yuki no su (雪の巣), 1954

=== Novels ===
- Banka (挽歌), 1956
- Itazura (いたずら), 1960
- Yameru oka (病める丘), 1960
- Satsujinsha (殺人者), 1962
- Kita no hayashi (北の林), 1968
- Niji (虹), 1975
- Nichiyobi no shiroi kumo (日曜日の白い雲), 1979
- Kaze no toride (風の砦), 1983
- Kaimu (海霧), 2003
