= Shūōshi Mizuhara =

Japanese poet and writer

- 水原秋桜子
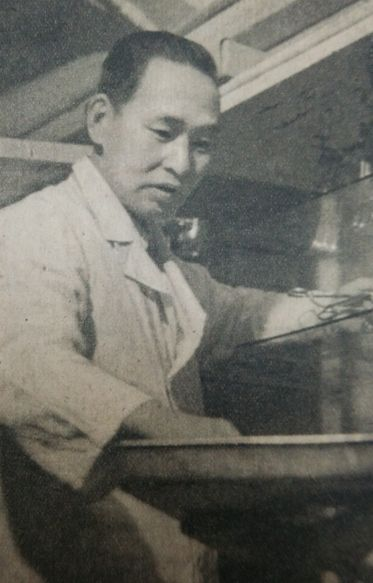
- Born: October 9, 1892; Tokyo
- Died: 1981
- Occupation: Poet

Shūōshi Mizuhara (水原秋桜子; October 9, 1892 – 1981) was a Japanese haiku poet and physician.

Shūōshi Mizuhara was born on October 9, 1892, in Tokyo. Shūōshi's father was a doctor and raised Shūōshi to follow in his footsteps, eventually taking over his medical practice. Shūōshi graduated with an MD from Tokyo University in 1926, specializing in obstetrics and gynaecology. He became a professor at Showa Medical College in 1928 and was appointed medical advisor for the Ministry of the Imperial Household in 1932. Following World War II, Shūōshi gave up his medical practice to focus on poetry.

Shūōshi's father unsuccessfully attempted to discourage his son's interest in literature. Shūōshi first became interested in tanka and only later turned to haiku. He was initially attached to Shibukaki school of haiku led by Tōyōjō Matsune, but, profoundly influenced by Kyoshi Takahama's manifesto Susumubeki haiku no michi ("The Path on Which Haiku Must Advance"), he soon joined the Hototogisu school and was prominently featured in the magazine.

He increasingly grew dissatisfied with what he saw as the restrictive conservative principles of the Hototogisu group. He published his first haiku collection, Katsushika, in 1930 to a tepid response from Kyoshi. The volume is now recognized by critics as a key work in the modernization of haiku. The next year, he wrote a romantic manifesto that served as his exit from Hototogisu, "Truth in Nature and Truth in Literature", where he wrote:

If the whole aim of haiku writing were to grasp 'truth in nature,' the poet would need no assiduous study to gain new knowledge, no constant endeavour to enrich his mind. All he would have to do would be to roam about with a notebook in his pocket, following the shadow of a cloud.

He and his followers had their own publication, Ashibi ("Staggerbush"), a rebranding of a magazine called Hamayumi.
