= Fukusumi Station =

Railway station in Japan

Fukusumi Station 福住駅
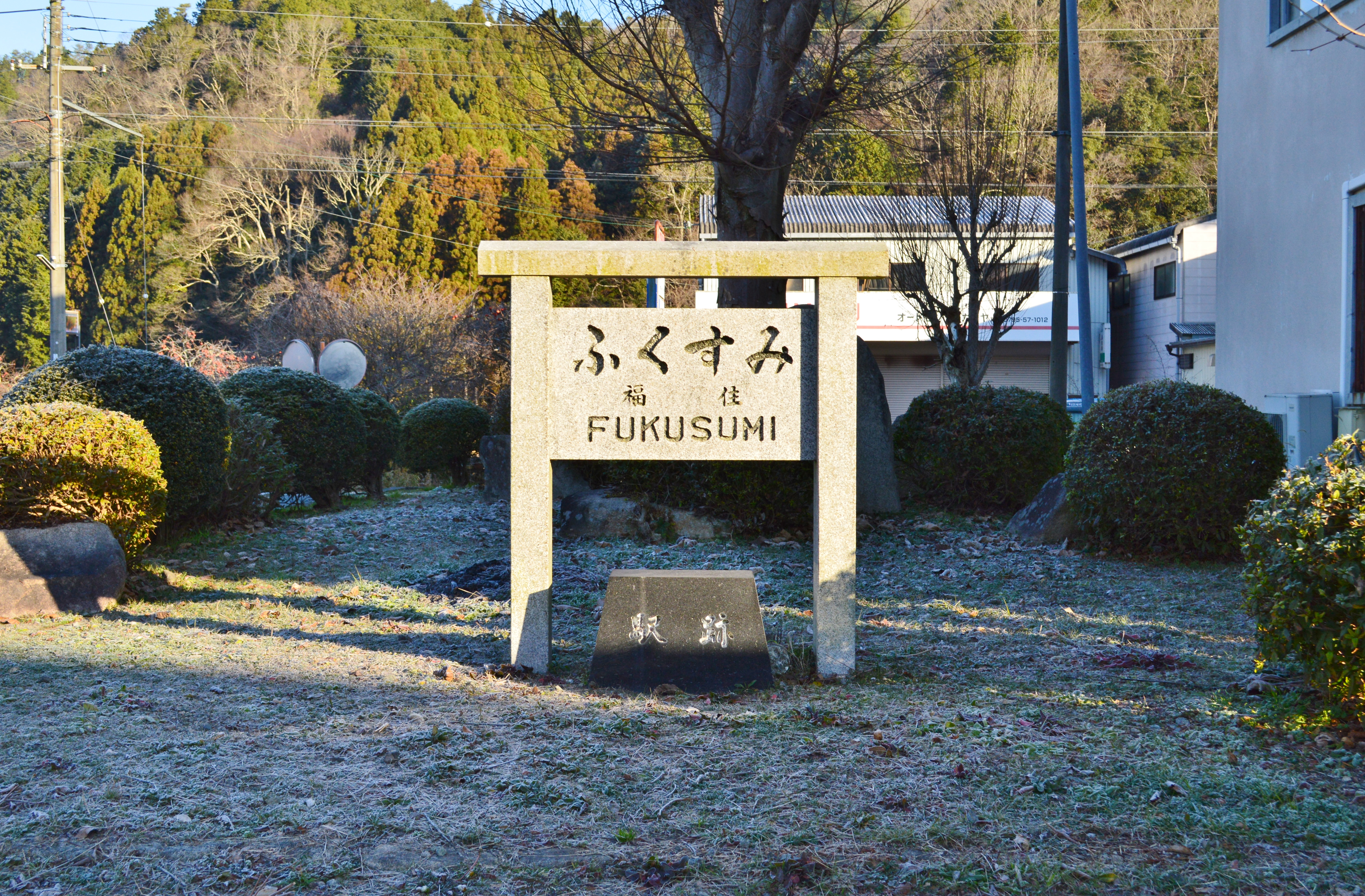
- Information board

General information
- Location: Fukusumi, Taki, Taki District, Hyogo （兵庫県多紀郡多紀町福住） Japan
- Coordinates: 35.072222°N 135.342361°E
- Operator: Japan National Railway
- Line: Sasayama Line
- Connections: Bus stop

History
- Opened: 1944
- Closed: 1972
Location
- Location within Hyōgo Prefecture Location within Japan

Fukusumi Station (福住駅, Fukusumi-eki) was a train station on the Sasayama Line in Fukusumi, Taki, Taki District, Hyogo, Japan. It closed in 1972. It is also a bus stop of Keihan Kyoto Kotsu and Shinki Green Bus.

== Line ==
- Japan National Railway
  - Sasayama Line

== Layout ==
The station featured was one platform with one track.

== Adjacent stations ==
| « | Service | » |
Japan national Railway Sasayama Line (Sasayamaguchi - Fukusumi: Sasayama Line)
| Murakumo | Local | Terminus |

== Bus routes ==
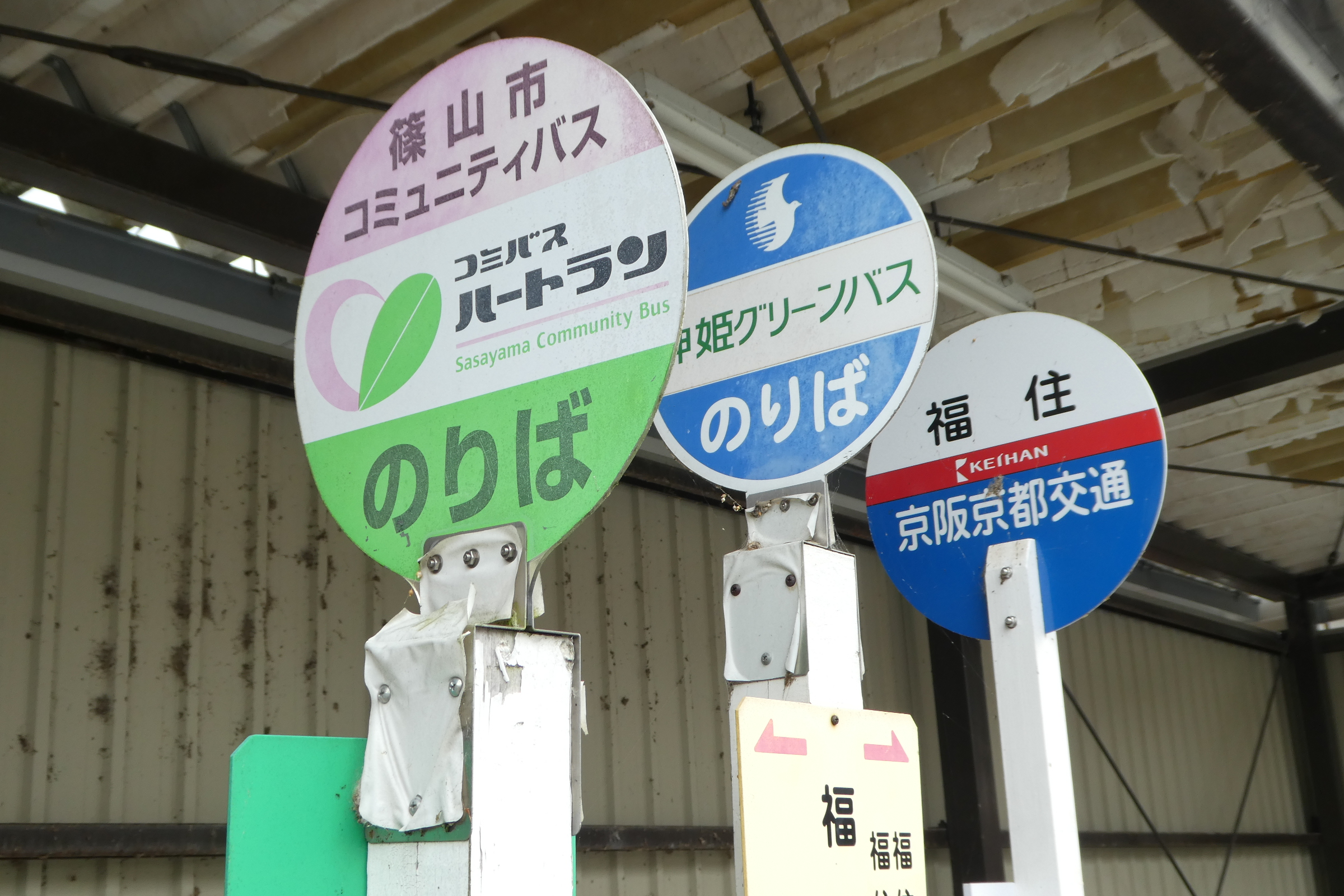
Bus stop

Route buses
| Operator | Via | Destination | Route | Note |
|---|---|---|---|---|
| Keihan Kyoto Kotsu | Nantan City Hall | Sonobe Station | Enjo Line | |
| Shinki Green Bus | Joto-Hioki, Yakami-Motomachi, Sasayama Office, Tamba-Wada, Fukusumi | Okuharayama | Fukusumi Sasayama circular-route Line | |
| Shinki Green Bus | Joto-Hioki, Yakami-Motomachi, Sasayama Office | Sasayamaguchi Station | Sasayama Line | |

Enjo Line has run since 1934. It altered Sasayama Line, which did not extend to Sonobe Station. It had been operated by JNR Bus and West JR Bus until 2002. This bus route was transferred to Shinki Bus and after that transferred to Keihan Bus.
