= Sasayama Line =

Former railway line in Japan

Overview
- Status: Discontinued
- Owner: Japanese National Railways
- Termini: Sasayamaguchi Station; Fukusumi Station
- Stations: 6

History
- Opened: 21 March 1944
- Closed: 1 March 1972

Technical
- Line length: 17.6 km (10.9 mi)
- Track gauge: 1,067 mm (3 ft 6 in)

Sasayama Line (篠山線, Sasayama-sen) was a railway line operated by Japanese National Railways that connected Sasayamaguchi Station with Fukusumi Station in present-day Tamba-Sasayama, Hyōgo, Japan. The line was discontinued on 1 March 1972.

== Data ==
The single-track 1,067-mm gauge railway was operated between Sasayamaguchi and Fukusumi (17.6 km) with six stations including both termini. The line was not electrified.

== History ==
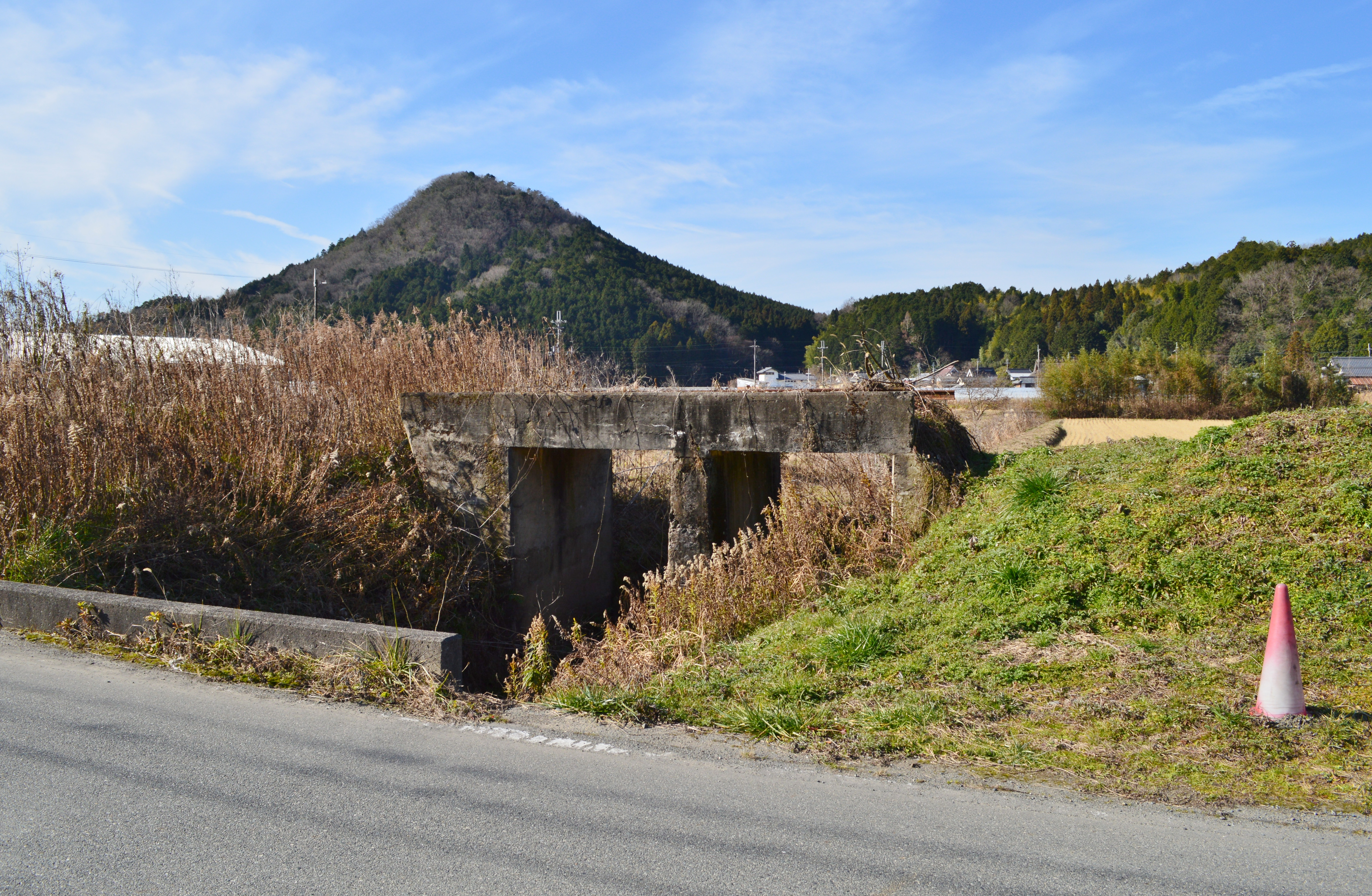
Bridge

During World War II, the railway line was constructed for transport of manganese and quartz sand, as a part of plan to connect Sasayamaguchi Station with Sonobe Station as bypass of Sanyo Main Line. In 1944, the line was open to traffic in the section between Sasayamaguchi Station and Fukusumi Station. At the same time, the Sasayama Railway which opened in 1913 was discontinued. In 1945, the end of the war led to the discontinuation of the construction of the remainder of the planned line to Sonobe Station.

After that, despite contribution to locals, ridership was low and in 1968, the line was listed as one of 83 unprofitable lines for consideration of closure. Consequently on 1 March 1972, the line was closed.

Besides, the Enjō Line (園篠線, Enjō-sen) bus route has been operated between Sasayamaguchi Station and Sonobe Station by Japanese Government Railways and Japanese National Railways since 1934. This line was inherited to West JR Bus, but JR withdrew from the operation in 2002. The line was substituted by Shinki Bus that runs between Sasayamaguchi Station and Fukusumi Station, and Keihan Kyoto Kotsu that runs between Fukusumi Station and Sonobe Station.

== Stations ==
Station name	Between stations (km)	Distance from terminus (km)	Connection	Location
Sasayamaguchi Station	-	0.0	Japanese National Railways: Fukuchiyama Line	
Sasayama Station	5.0	5.0		
Yakami Station	3.8	8.8		
Tamba-Hioki Station	1.8	10.6		
Murakumo Station	3.6	14.2		
Fukusumi Station	3.4	17.6		

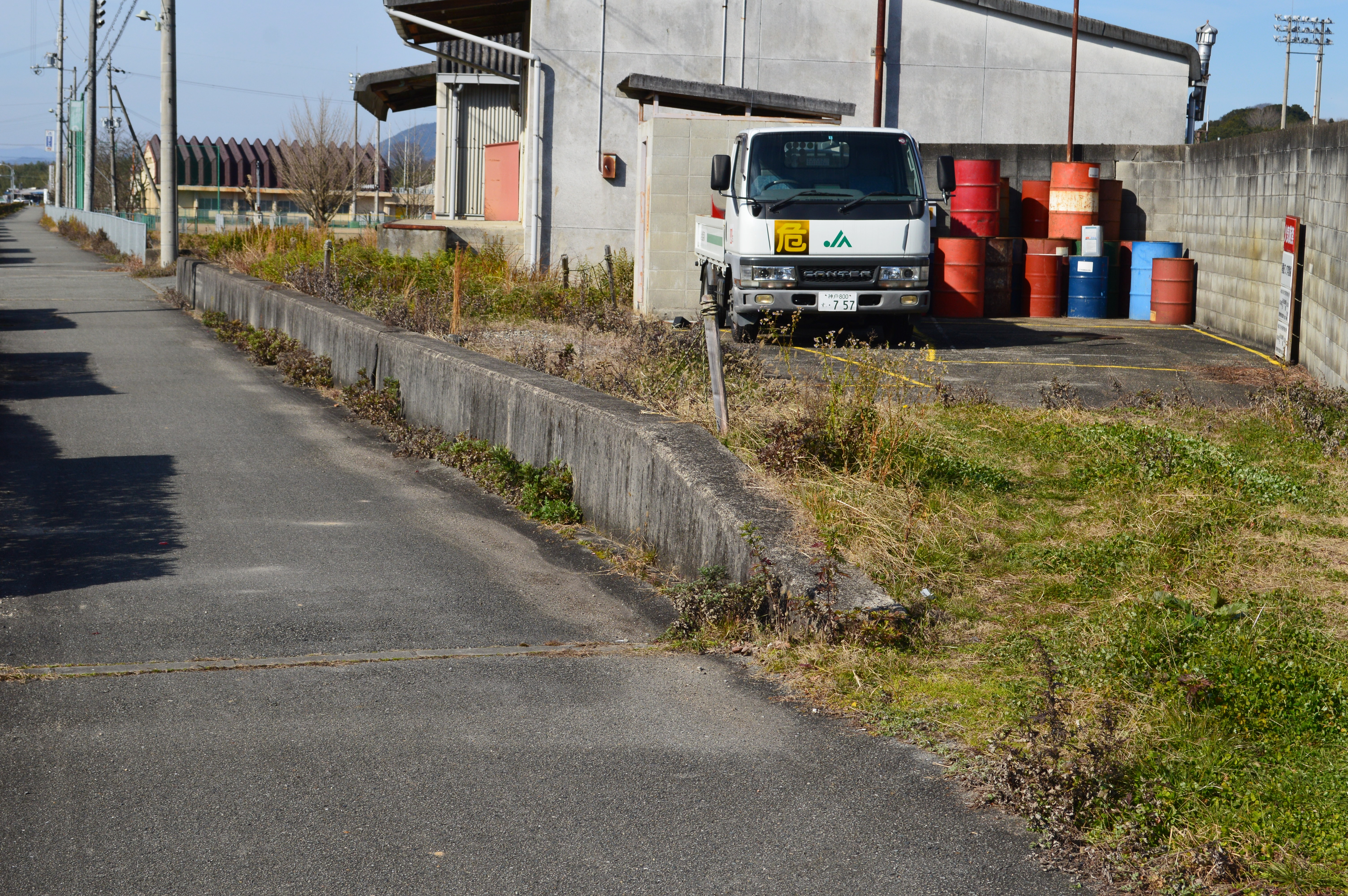
Tamba-Hioki Station

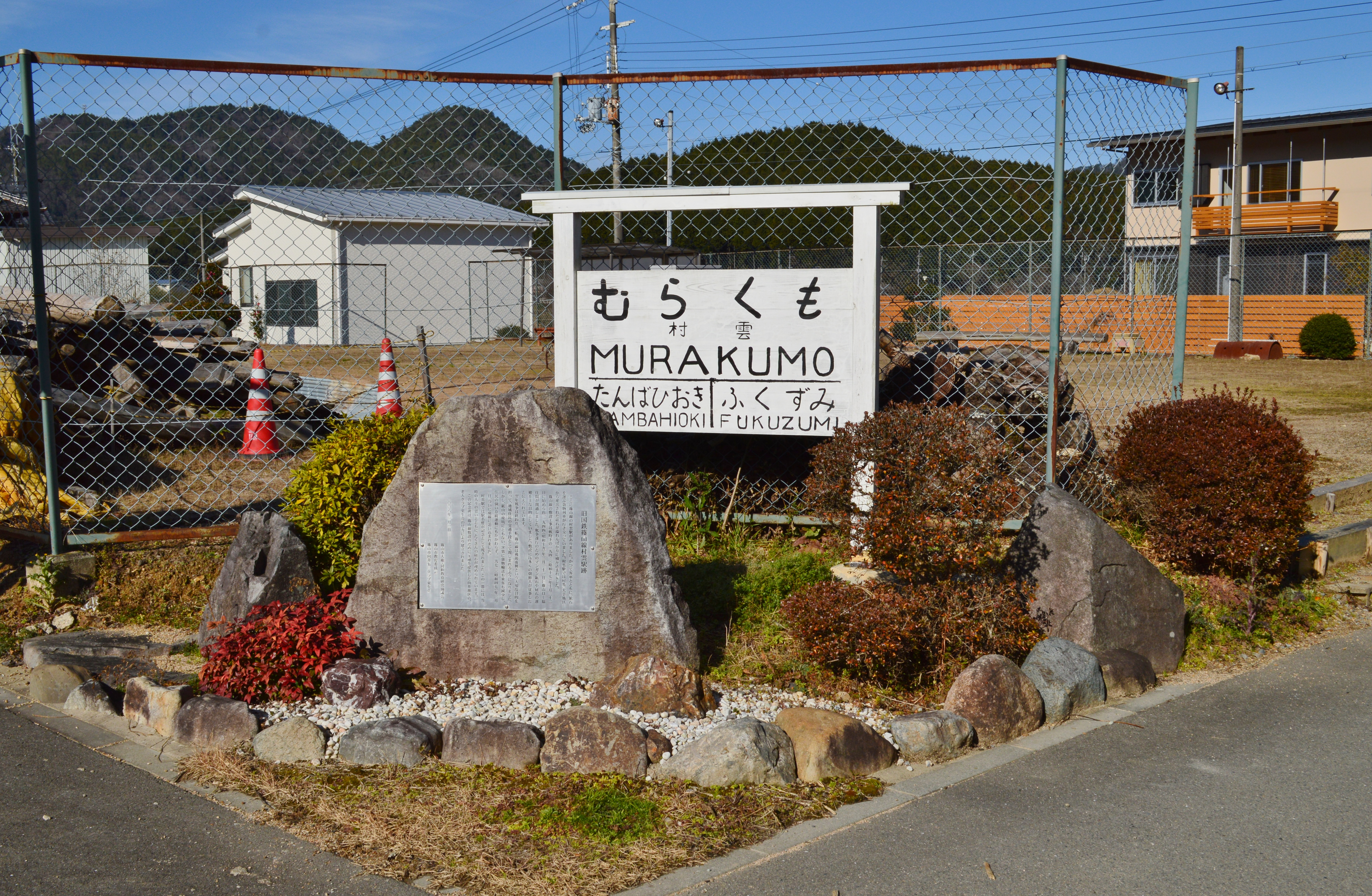
Murakumo Station

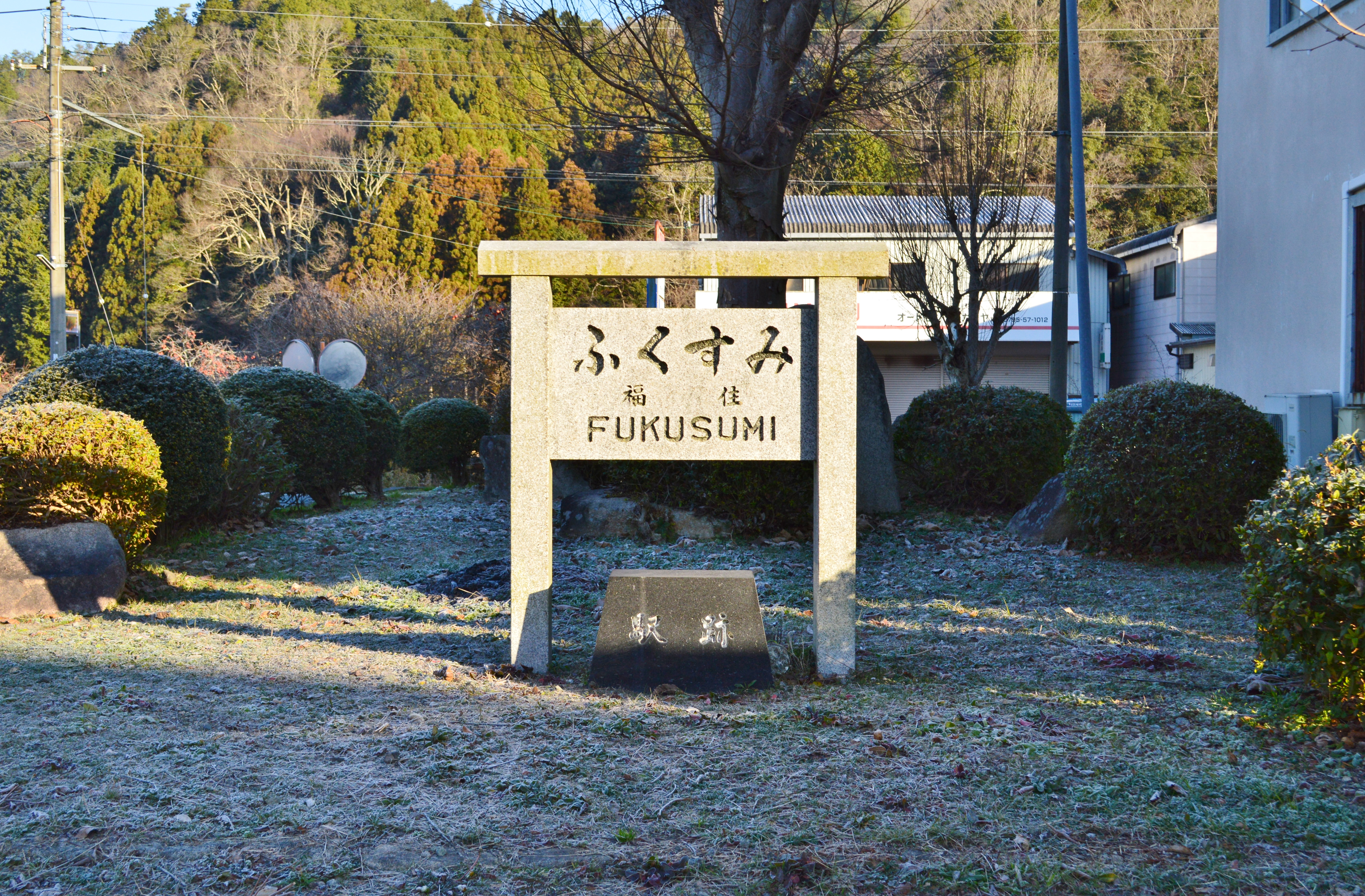
Fukusumi Station
