= UC Senior Secondary College Lake Ginninderra =

Location
- 2 Emu Bank; Belconnen, Australian Capital Territory, 2617; Australia; 35°14′21″S 149°4′26″E

Information
- Type: Public secondary college
- Motto: Connect Innovate Impact
- Established: 1987
- Principal: Melissa Planten
- Staff: 83
- Years offered: 11–12
- Gender: Coeducational
- Enrolment: 691
- Colours: Green and blue
- Newspaper: Lake News
- Website: www.lakeonline.act.edu.au

University of Canberra Senior Secondary College Lake Ginninderra, formerly known as Lake Ginninderra College until 2011, is a public secondary college for students in Years 11 and 12. It is located in the Australian Capital Territory, Australia, situated on the lakefront of Lake Ginninderra.

The college is the designated school for students attending the Australian Institute of Sport (AIS).

== History ==
UC Senior Secondary College Lake Ginninderra was established in 1987, with John Cope being appointed as founding Principal. The college is located near its partner facilities, the University of Canberra and the Australian Institute of Sport (AIS).

The college is the designated school for students in Years 11 and 12 attending the AIS, consistent with a Memorandum of Understanding between the Australian Sports Commission and the ACT Government. The college has supported AIS students with a range of programs to enable completion of their secondary education while training at the institute.

== Campus ==
The college is located in Belconnen, Canberra. Following its completion in 1987, the unique architecture of the campus gained local recognition, and was awarded the ACT Architecture Merit Award. Daryl Jackson, an internationally renowned Australian architect, also featured the college in an article in which he discussed several of his personal favourite school designs, the thinking, underpinning the designs and what makes them work effectively.

== Curriculum ==
=== Year 12 Certification and Tertiary Entrance ===
The college offers students over eighty courses of study for the award of the ACT Year 12 Certificate, with students who complete a T (Tertiary) Package able to sit the ACT Scaling Test (AST) to obtain an Australian Tertiary Admission Rank (ATAR) for admission to university.

=== Vocational Education and Training courses ===
The college offers a large range of Vocational Education and Training courses (VET) programs. A high percentage of students who graduate with a Year 12 Certificate also receive at least one VET qualification.

== Sport ==
=== Basketball team achievements ===
==== Championship Men (Open) ====
- Australian Schools Championships

(gold) Champions: (9) 1997, 2000, 2001, 2007, 2013, 2015, 2019, 2022, 2025
(silver) Runners Up: 2012, 2017, 2018, 2023
(bronze) Third Place: 2024

==== Championship Women (Open) ====
- Australian Schools Championships

(gold) Champions: (4) 1988, 1989, 1990, 2022
(silver) Runners Up: 2017, 2019
(bronze) Third Place: 2025

== Notable students and alumni ==
- Mustafa Amini – footballer
- David Andersen – basketball player
- Kelsey-Lee Barber - athlete
- Andrew Barr – politician
- Suzy Batkovic – basketball player
- Abby Bishop – basketball player
- Andrew Bogut – former professional basketball player
- Dante Exum – basketball player
- Lexie Feeney – archer
- Shane Heal – basketball player
- Belinda Hocking – backstroke swimmer
- Joe Ingles – basketball player for the Milwaukee Bucks
- Lauren Jackson – basketball player
- Rachel Jarry – basketball player
- Damian Martin – basketball player
- Patty Mills – basketball player
- Cameron Myers – athlete
- Brad Newley – basketball player
- Tyrese Proctor - basketball player
- Luke Schenscher – basketball player
- Belinda Snell – basketball player
- Jane Waller – archer
- Taylor Worth – archer
- Emily Van Egmond – soccer player
- Kye Rowles – soccer player
- Josh Giddey – basketball player for the Oklahoma City Thunder
- Chima Moneke – basketball player for the Sacramento Kings
- Lee Hyun-jung - basketball player

== See also ==
- List of schools in the Australian Capital Territory
- Global Classroom Conference, hosted by the college in 2017
