= SACLA =

X-ray free-electron laser

The SPring-8 Angstrom Compact Free Electron Laser, referred to as SACLA (pronounced さくら (Sa-Ku-Ra)), is an X-ray free-electron laser (XFEL) in Harima Science Garden City, Japan, embedded in the SPring-8 accelerator and synchrotron complex. When it first came into operation 2011, it was the second XFEL in the world and the first in Japan.

== Design ==
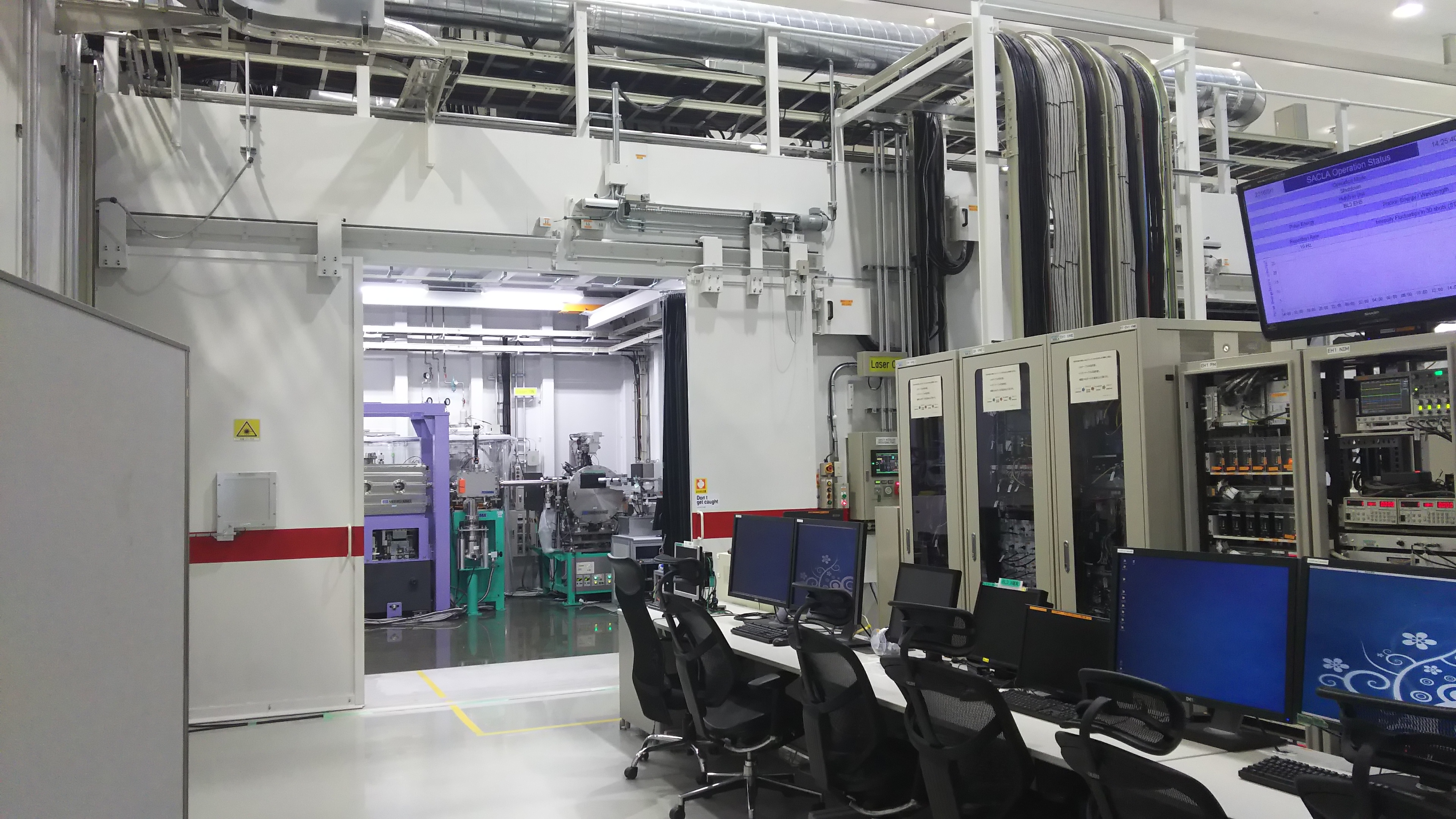
The experimental hutch of SACLA

Like other XFELs, SACLA uses self-amplified spontaneous emission to achieve extremely high intensities of X-rays. SACLA uses in-vacuum, short-period undulators, which is one of the unique factors in its design that allows it to achieve sub-Ångstrom wavelengths of 0.6 Å at a relatively much shorter distance of 0.7 km, compared to other similar XFELs like LCLS (2 km) or the European XFEL (3.4 km). An 8.5 GeV electron beam is used as the source.

== Animated short films ==
SACLA has released a number of animated short films to promote its research capabilities to the public. In July 2013, SACLA released two animated short films titled "Picotopia", which discussed the cellular biology, and "Wasureboshi", which is about conception.

On December 3, 2013, another animated short titled "Mirai Koshi: Harima SACLA" was released to promote the XFEL's ability to detect atoms and molecules.
