= Self-amplified spontaneous emission =

Laser technology

Self-amplified spontaneous emission (SASE) is a process within a free-electron laser (FEL) by which a laser beam is created from a high-energy electron beam.

The SASE process starts with an electron bunch being injected into an undulator, with a velocity close to the speed of light and a uniform density distribution within the bunch. In the undulator the electrons are wiggled and emit light characteristic of the undulator strength but within a certain energy bandwidth. The emitted photons travel slightly faster than the electrons and interact with them each undulator period. Depending on the relative phase between electrons and photons, electrons gain or lose energy (velocity), i.e. faster electrons catch up with slower ones. Thereby the electron bunch density is periodically modulated by the radiation which is called microbunching. The structured electron beam amplifies only certain photon energies at the cost of kinetic energy until the system goes into saturation. SASE energy spectra show a noise-like distribution of intense spikes on top of a lower-amplitude background. The micro-bunch structuring reduces the phase space available to the photons, thus they are also more likely to have a similar phase and the emitted beam is quasi-coherent.

This concept has been demonstrated at the SPring-8 FEL SACLA in Japan, the Free electron LASer in Hamburg (FLASH) and the Linac Coherent Light Source (LCLS) at SLAC.

== See also ==
- Spontaneous emission
- List of laser articles
