= Nara Women's University =

Japanese university

Coordinates: 34°41′17″N 135°49′41″E

- 奈良女子大学
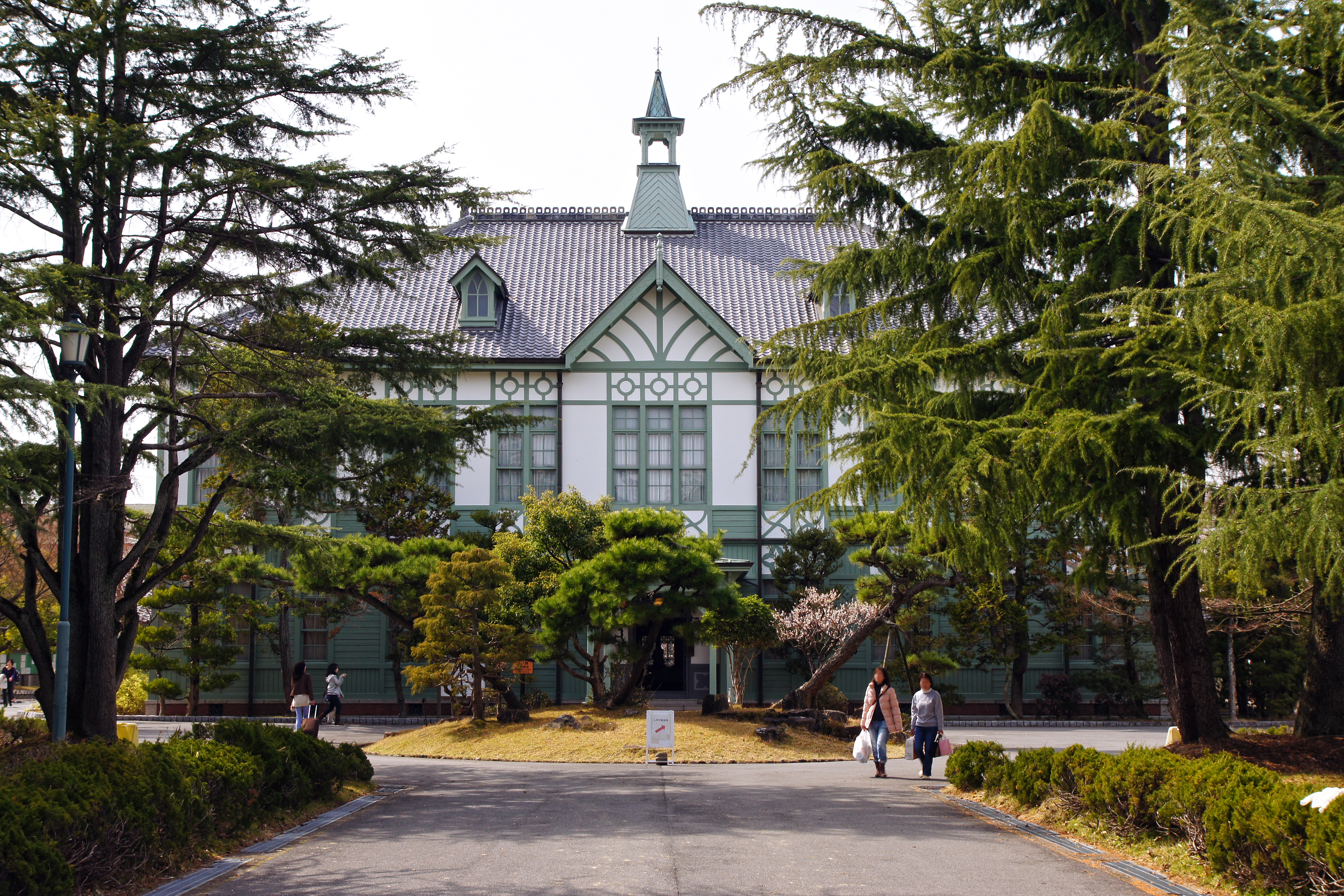
- The NWU, Memorial Hall
- Type: Public (National)
- Established: 1908
- President: Kenji Kume
- Undergraduates: about 2,200
- Postgraduates: about 640
- Location: Nara, Nara Prefecture, Japan
- Campus: Urban
- Website: Nara Women's University

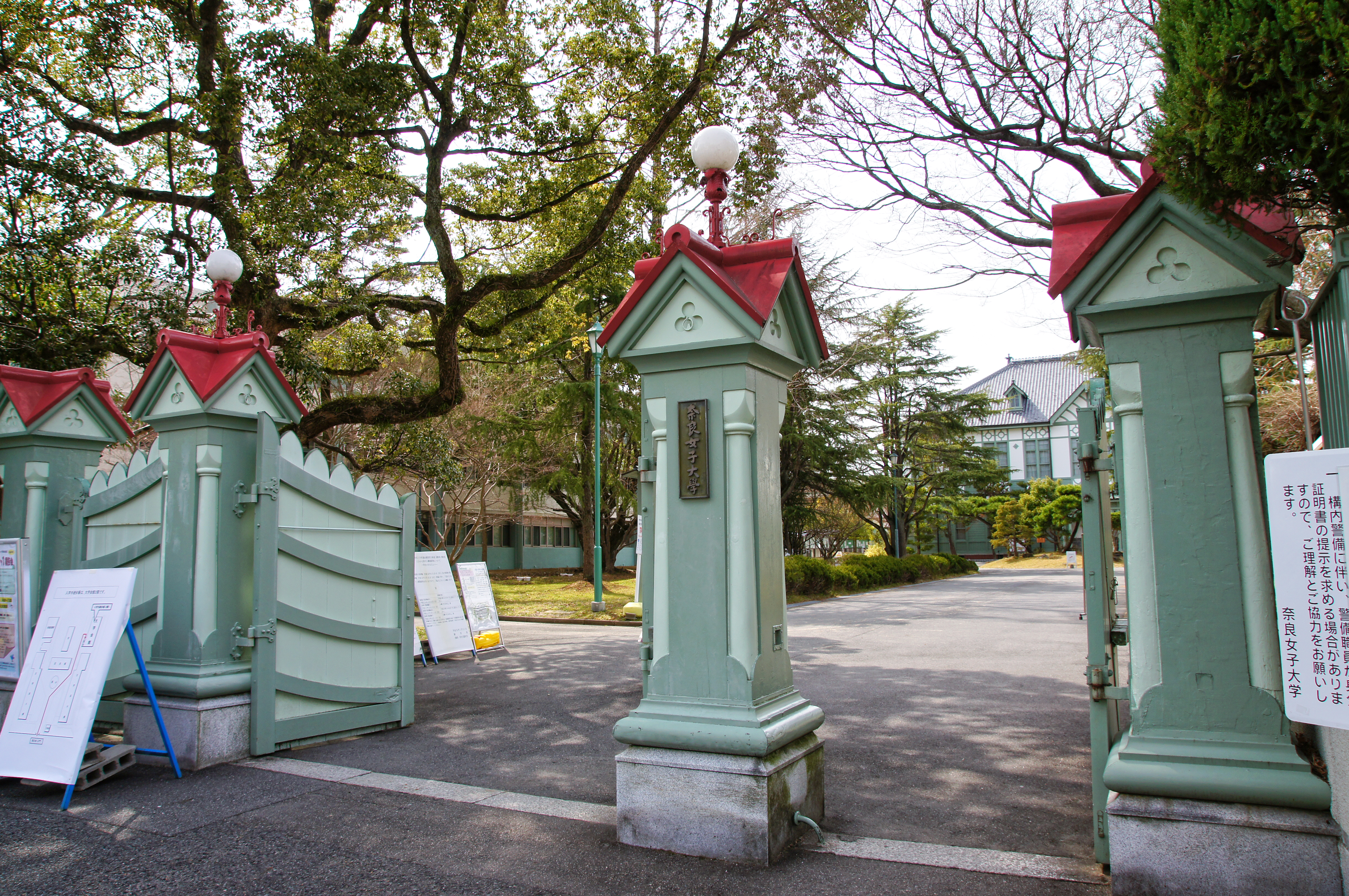
The NWU, main entrance

Nara Women's University (奈良女子大学, Nara joshi daigaku) is a national women's university located in Nara, Nara Prefecture, Japan. It is one of two national women's universities in the country, the other being Ochanomizu University.

== History ==
Nara Women's University was originally created in 1908 with the aim of training women teachers for ordinary schools, later to be reorganized and renamed with its current name in 1949. Until 1949 there were only two women's imperial quasi-universities in Japan, the Ochanomizu University and Nara Women's University.

Nara Women's University was formerly called Nara joshi kōtō shihan gakkō (奈良女子高等師範学校; Nara advanced teachers college for women).

== Faculties ==
As of 2013, the university has three faculties:

- the Faculty of Letters
- the Faculty of Science
- the Faculty of Human Life and Environment

== Graduate school ==
As of 2013, the university has two graduate programs:

- Master's Course of Humanities and Sciences
- Doctoral Course of Humanities and Sciences

== Buildings ==
The following buildings on the university's campus are designated Important Cultural Properties:

- the Memorial Hall (formerly the main hall)
- the Main Gate

== See also ==
- Global Classroom Conference, hosted by the University in 2000
