= Harima Science Garden City =

Planned city in Japan

Coordinates: 34°56′09″N 134°26′32″E

Map

Harima Science Garden City(播磨科学公園都市, Harima-Kagaku-Koen-Toshi) is a city constructed by opening up a hilly area in Harima, the southern-west part of Hyogo Prefecture. The city straddles Tatsuno, Kamigori and Sayo. The address was named Koto, which means city of light. In the north part of the city are SPring-8 and SACLA. It is a base-city of the Nishi-Harima Technopolis Plan.

== Concepts and present situation ==
Under the guidance of prominent architects and landscape design experts from Japan and abroad (Arata Isozaki, Tadao Ando, Mari Watanabe, Peter Walker, etc.), the entire city was planned based on the concept of "a city in the forest that grows with time". By designing both the urban functions and the landscape in an integrated manner, the goal was to create a well-designed city with a comfortable living environment and an excellent research environment. For this reason, especially in the early stages of the project, a number of highly designed buildings were built by the aforementioned architects that reflect the current trends in architectural design at the time of the project (1980s), such as postmodern architecture.

In 1997, a "Machibiraki Festival" was held to celebrate the opening of SPring-8, the centerpiece of the project.

The city is commonly known as "Technopolis" or "Techno", and Hyogo Prefectural Road 44 Aioi-Shiso Line leading to the city is nicknamed "Harima Techno Line". In the center of the city is the "Techno Chuo" intersection.

In 2015, 30 years after the start of development, the population of the area was reported to be 1,434, which is only 5.7% of the original planned population of 25,000.

The area is mainly occupied by public facilities and research facilities, and most of the developed land is currently for sale.

== Transportation ==
=== Roads ===
==== Expressway ====
- Harima Expressway

==== Prefectural roads ====
- Kamigori-Suehiro Line
- Aioi-Shiso Line (Harima Techno Line)

=== Buses ===
The buses from Aioi station to SPring-8 run about every 30 minutes from Mondays to Fridays and every 1 hour on Saturdays and Sundays by West-Shinki. From Mondays to Fridays, in the morning, there are the express and limited express buses, and there are buses that only go as far as Koto Bus Center (new in 2021). The buses bound for Koto Bus Center do not go to SPring-8 and are mainly used by the students of The High School and Junior High School of University of Hyogo.

Apart from the buses from Aioi station, there are buses from Himeji Station, Harima-Shingu station, Kamigori station by Shiki bus and West-Shinki and the Sayo community buses from Mikazuki Station to The High School and Junior High School of University of Hyogo, but there are only a few and these buses except from Harima-Shingu station do not run on Saturdays and Sundays.

== External links section ==
- 兵庫県 播磨科学公園都市ホームページ
