= Australian Schools Championships =

- Most recent season or competition: 2025 Australian Schools Championships
- Sport: Basketball
- Organising body: Basketball Australia
- No. of teams: 226 (2025)
- Country: Australia
- Most recent champion: Lake Ginninderra (Champ Men's) -- Brisbane State High School (Champ Women's)
- Streaming partner: KommunityTv
- Sponsor: Foot Locker
- Website: https://www.competitions.basketball/competitions/school-championships

The Australian School Championships (ASC) is the pinnacle event for school basketball in Australia that sees secondary schools from around Australia travel and compete in a week-long event.

In recent years the ASC’s have become so well regarded that they have on many occasions included teams from neighbouring countries participating in the event.

The format consists of two divisions for each age group.

== Results ==
=== Championship Men ===
Season (Host)	Premiers	Runners-Up	Third Place	Fourth Place
2010 (Bendigo)	(New South Wales) Sydney Boys HS	(New South Wales) Newington College	(Victoria (state)) St Patrick's College	(South Australia) Concordia College
2011 (Bendigo)	(New South Wales) Sydney Boys HS	China	(Victoria (state)) Box Hill SSC	(New South Wales) Newington College
2012 (Melbourne)	(Victoria (state)) Caulfield Grammar	(Australian Capital Territory) Lake Ginniderra	(South Australia) Unley HS	(New South Wales) Sydney Boys HS
2013 (Melbourne)	(Australian Capital Territory) Lake Ginniderra	(New South Wales) Scots College	(New South Wales) Sydney Boys HS	(Tasmania) Launceston College
2014 (Canberra)	(New South Wales) St Augustine's	(South Australia) Sacred Heart College	(New South Wales) Sydney Boys HS	(Queensland) St James College
2015 (Canberra)	(Australian Capital Territory) Lake Ginniderra	(Queensland) Ignatius Park College	(Western Australia) Aquinas College	(New South Wales) Sydney Boys HS
2016 (Melbourne)	(Victoria (state)) Marcellin	(South Australia) Trinity College	(Queensland) Hillcrest Christian College	(Australian Capital Territory) Lake Ginniderra
2017 (Melbourne)	(Victoria (state)) Box Hill SSC	(Australian Capital Territory) Lake Ginniderra	(Western Australia) Willetton SHS	(Queensland) St James College
2018 (Melbourne)	(South Australia) Trinity College	(Australian Capital Territory) Lake Ginniderra	(Western Australia) Willetton SHS	(Victoria (state)) Rowville SC
2019 (Melbourne)	(Australian Capital Territory) Lake Ginniderra	(Victoria (state)) Box Hill SSC	(South Australia) Trinity College	(New South Wales) Sydney Boys HS
2020	Season not contested due to COVID-19 pandemic in Australia			
2021	Season not contested due to COVID-19 pandemic in Australia			
2022 (Gold Coast)	(Australian Capital Territory) Lake Ginniderra	(Victoria (state)) Rowville SC	(Queensland) Brisbane SHS	(Queensland) The Southport School
2023 (Gold Coast)	(Queensland) The Southport School	(Australian Capital Territory) Lake Ginniderra	(Victoria (state)) Rowville SC	(New South Wales) Newington College
2024 (Gold Coast)	(Victoria (state)) Berwick College	(South Australia) Trinity College	(Australian Capital Territory) Lake Ginniderra	(Queensland) Brisbane Boys College
2025 (Gold Coast)	(Australian Capital Territory) Lake Ginniderra	(Western Australia) Willetton Senior HS	(Queensland) The Southport School	(Victoria (state)) Templestowe College

=== Championship Women ===
Season (Host)	Premiers	Runners-Up	Third Place	Fourth Place
2010 (Bendigo)	(Queensland) John Paul College	(Victoria (state)) Caulfield Grammar	(New South Wales) Xavier High School	(South Australia) Immanuel College
2011 (Bendigo)	(Queensland) John Paul College	(Victoria (state)) Box Hill SSC	(Western Australia) Willetton SHS	(South Australia) Cabra Dominican
2012 (Melbourne)	(Queensland) John Paul College	(Victoria (state)) Rowville SC	(Queensland) Mountain Creek SHS	(Tasmania) Rosny College
2013 (Melbourne)	(Victoria (state)) Rowville SC	(Queensland) John Paul College	(Victoria (state)) Catholic Ladies College	(South Australia) Cabra Dominican
2014 (Canberra)	(Victoria (state)) Rowville SC	(Queensland) John Paul College	(New South Wales) Monte Sant' Angelo	(Queensland) Palm Beach Currumbin SHS
2015 (Canberra)	(Queensland) John Paul College	(New South Wales) St Joseph's Catholic College	(Victoria (state)) Box Hill SSC	(New South Wales) Westfields Sports HS
2016 (Melbourne)	(Victoria (state)) Box Hill SSC	(Victoria (state)) Rowville SC	(Victoria (state)) Maribyrnong College	(Queensland) St Peters Lutheran College
2017 (Melbourne)	(Queensland) St Margaret Mary's College	(Australian Capital Territory) Lake Ginniderra	(Victoria (state)) Bendigo SSC	(Western Australia) Willetton SHS
2018 (Melbourne)	(Victoria (state)) Rowville SC	(South Australia) Immanuel College	(Western Australia) Willetton SHS	(Queensland) Hillcrest Christian College
2019 (Melbourne)	(Victoria (state)) Box Hill SSC	(Australian Capital Territory) Lake Ginniderra	(New South Wales) St Luke's Grammar	(South Australia) Immanuel College
2020	Season not contested due to COVID-19 pandemic in Australia			
2021	Season not contested due to COVID-19 pandemic in Australia			
2022 (Gold Coast)	(Australian Capital Territory) Lake Ginniderra	(Queensland) Hillcrest Christian College	(South Australia) Immanuel College	(Victoria (state)) Rowville SC
2023 (Gold Coast)	(Victoria (state)) Rowville SC	(New South Wales) Westfields Sports HS	(Queensland) Marsden SHS	(Queensland) John Paul College
2024 (Gold Coast)	(Queensland) Brisbane SHS	(South Australia) Immanuel College	(New South Wales) Barker College	(Victoria (state)) Rowville SC
2025 (Gold Coast)	(Queensland) Brisbane SHS	(New South Wales) Barker College	(Australian Capital Territory) Lake Ginniderra	(Victoria (state)) Rowville SC
