= Mount Hatsuka =

Mountain in Hyōgo Prefecture, Japan

- 羽束山
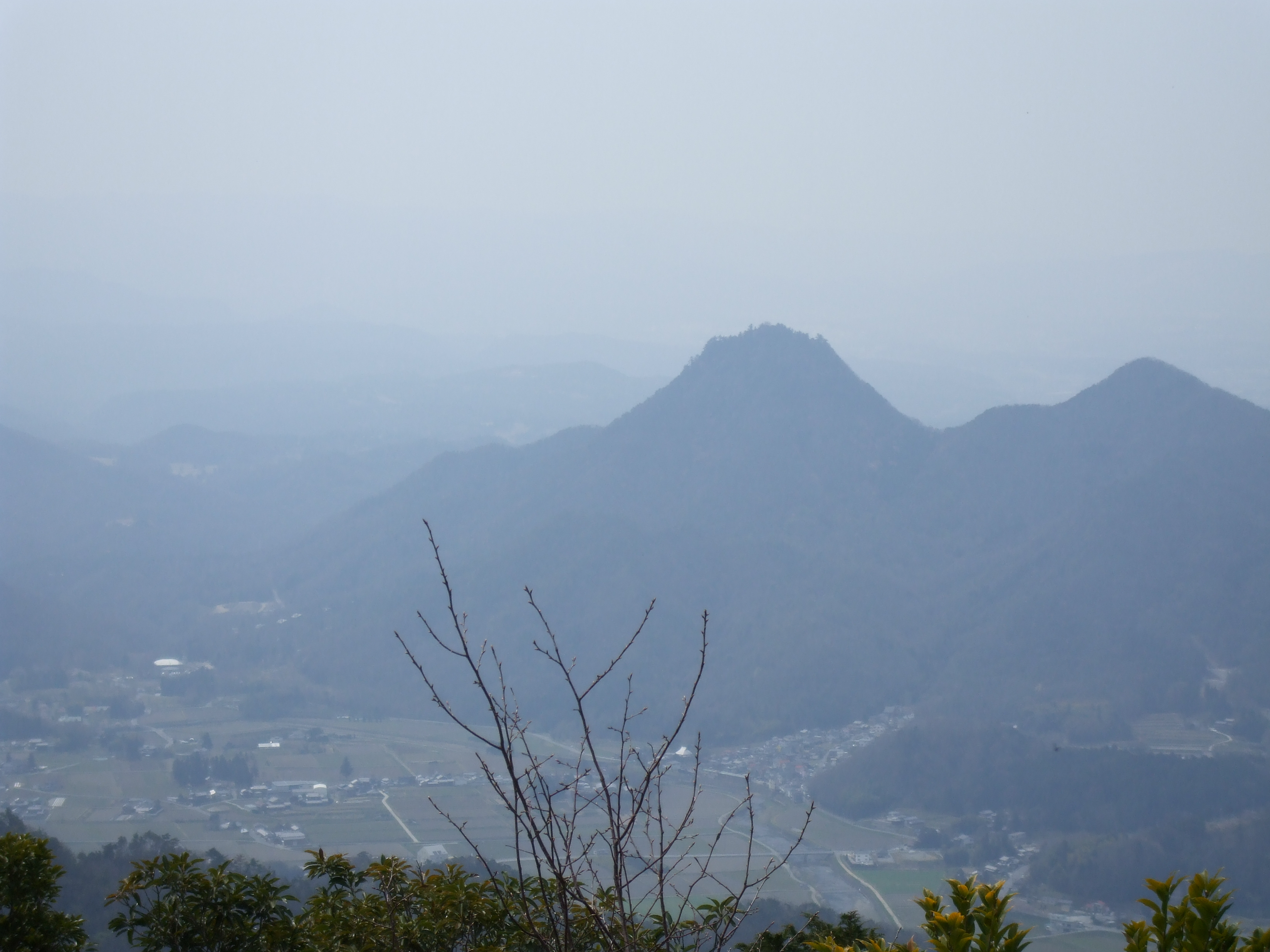

Highest point
- Elevation: 524.0 m (1,719.2 ft)
- Coordinates: 34°55′N 135°16′E

Naming
- Pronunciation: [hatsɯ̥kajama]

Geography
- Location: Sanda, Hyōgo, Japan
- Parent range: Tamba Highland

Mount Hatsuka (羽束山, Hatsuka-yama) is a 524.0 meter high Japanese mountain in Sanda, Hyōgo, Japan. Another name of this mountain is Mount Koge.

Mount Hatsuka is an independent peak in Tamba Highland. This mountain is on a popular picnic course from Dojo Station to Kozuki Bus Stop of Shinki Bus. On the top of the mountain, Hatsuka Shrine is extant.

== History ==
This mountain was one of the mountains of the enduring ascetic practices for Shugenja monks. On the foot of this mountain there is the Koge-ji temple.

== Access ==
- Kozuki Bus Stop of Shinki Bus
- Koge Bus Stop of Shinki Bus
