= High School and Junior High School of University of Hyogo =

The High School and Junior High School of University of Hyogo
- 兵庫県立大学附属中学校・高等学校

Location
- Kōto, Kamigōri, Akō, Hyogo; Japan
- Coordinates: 34°55′24.2″N 134°26′52.9″E

Information
- Type: Government
- Motto: Sōshin
- Established: 1 April 1994 (HS); 1 January 2007 (JHS)
- Newspaper: Sōshin
- Website: Junior high school High school

The High School and Junior High School of University of Hyogo (兵庫県立大学附属中学校・高等学校, Hyōgo Kenritsu Daigaku Fuzoku Chūgakkō・Kōtōgakkō) is a Japanese high school and junior high school located in Kōto, Kamigōri, Akō District, Hyōgo, Japan, in Harima Science Garden City.

== School motto ==
The school's motto is (創進 －創造と進歩の人たれ－; "Sōshin: Be Creative and Progressive Pioneers").

== Extracurricular activities ==
=== Junior high school ===
==== Sports ====
- Athletics
- Kendo
- Basketball
- Table tennis (new in 2016)

==== Cultural activities ====
- Natural science
- Japanese tea ceremony
- English Speaking Society
- Fine arts (new in 2016)

==== Other ====
- Student council

=== High school ===
==== Sports ====
- Athletics
- Swimming
- Kendo
- Soccer
- Baseball
- Table tennis
- Basketball
- Badminton
- Tennis

==== Cultural activities ====
- Natural science
  - Astronomy Group
  - Biology Group
  - Chemistry Group
  - Physics Group
- Japanese tea ceremony and Ikebana
- English Speaking Society
- Broadcasting
- Literature
- Music
- Computer

==== Other ====
- Student council

== Sister schools ==
- Willetton Senior High School, Australia

Cultural exchanges started in 1995, and a collaborative international partnership was established in 2005.

- Masan Happo High School, Korea

A collaborative international partnership was established in 2007.

- Triam Udom Suksa School, Thailand

Cultural exchanges started in 2001, and a collaborative international partnership was established in 2009.

== See also ==
- University of Hyogo
- Secondary education in Japan
