= Willetton Senior High School =

School in Willetton, Western Australia

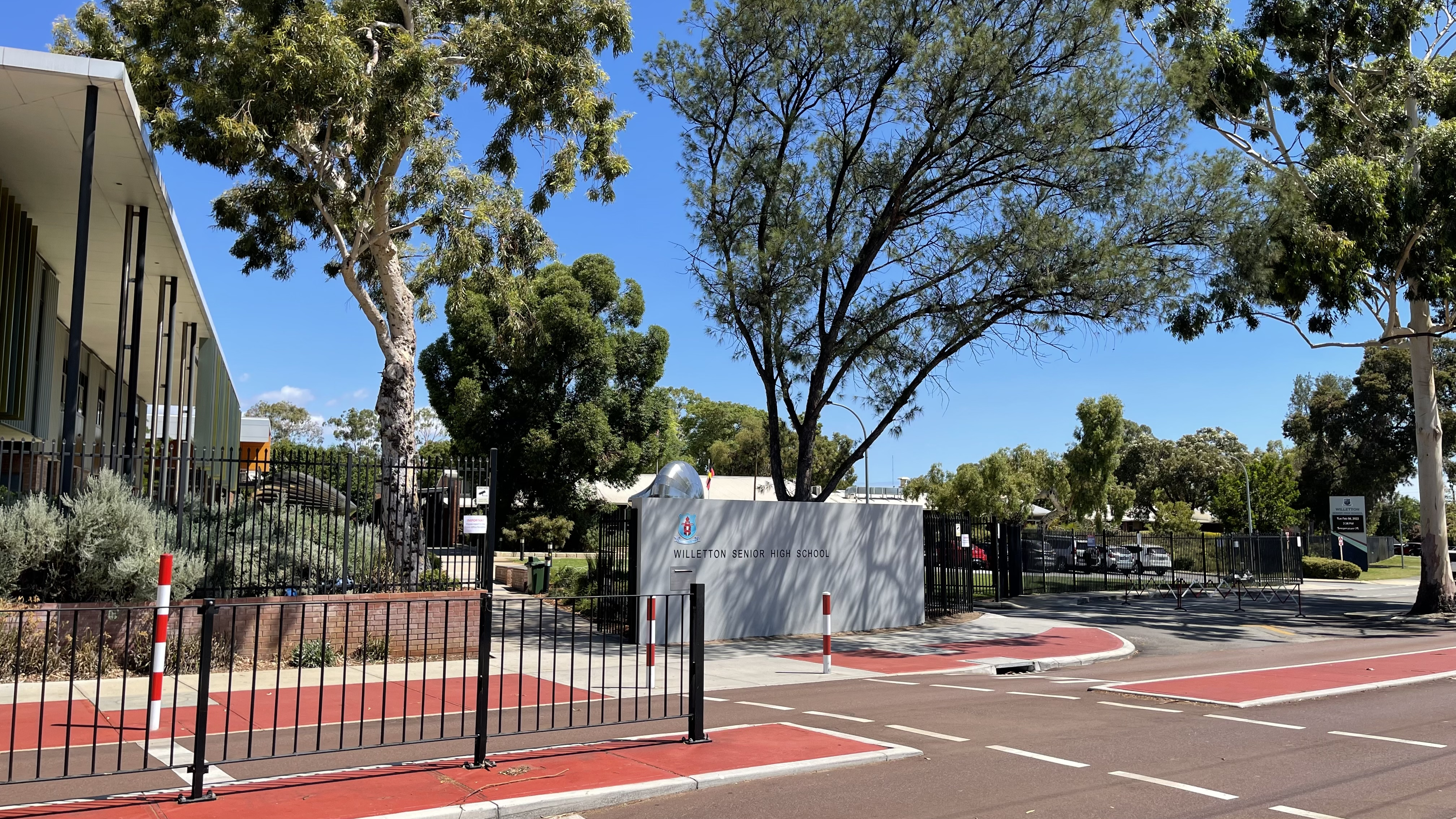

Location
- Willetton, Western Australia; Australia; 32°03′35″S 115°52′44″E

Information
- Type: Public co-educational secondary day school
- Motto: Give, Grow, Guide
- Established: 1 January 1977; 49 years ago
- Sister school: The High School and Junior High School of University of Hyogo
- Educational authority: WA Department of Education
- Principal: Trevor Hunter
- Staff: 282 (31 December 2024)
- Years: 7–12
- Enrolment: 2,729 (31 December 2024)
- Area: 4,500 m^{2} (1 acre)
- Campus type: Suburban
- Colours: Light blue and maroon (7–10); White and maroon (11–12)
- Yearbook: Reflections
- Website: www.willettonshs.wa.edu.au

Willetton Senior High School (WSHS) is a public secondary school in Willetton, Western Australia, 12 kilometres (7.5 miles) south of the Perth central business district and 12.6 kilometres (7.8 miles) east of the port of Fremantle. The school opened in February 1977 with 77 students. It is one of the largest schools in Western Australia, with 2,729 enrolled students as of 31 December 2024.

The student catchment area for WSHS encompasses the suburb of Willetton and part of the suburb of Bull Creek, which is shared with Leeming Senior High School and Rossmoyne Senior High School.

== Campus ==
WSHS covers an area of approximately 4,500 square metres (1.1 acres), located adjacent to Burrendah Primary School and Castlereagh School. There are seven main buildings, along with numerous transportable buildings, some many years old. A$5 million upgrade was completed in 2008 that resulted in the construction of a new gymnasium and several new facilities.

WSHS underwent a multimillion-dollar renovation and redevelopment that commenced in 2014. In the second semester of 2014, asbestos contamination was detected after construction workers found pieces of asbestos had fallen off the roof of a school building slated for demolition. The school was closed for a week so the site could be inspected. Teachers were sent to work from North Lake Senior High School where they connected with students via the internet so that classes could continue.

The following phase of the redevelopment, involving the construction of another block of classrooms, commenced in February 2022. Construction was completed in early 2024.

== Academic rankings ==
The Year 12 cohorts at Willetton perform consistently well in the WACE school rankings, and the school ranks well when compared to other schools in Western Australia.

WA school ATAR ranking
Year	Rank	Median ATAR	Eligible students	Students with ATAR	% students with ATAR	Notes
2018	15	87.5	367	294	79.84	
2017	13	89.15	395	272	68.86	
2016	14	88.05	389	289	74.29	

Year 12 student achievement data
Year	Rank (Note: Ranking of school compared to other schools in the state)	% +75 in WACE (Note: Based on the number of Stage 3 course enrolments in the school where a WACE course score of 75 or above was achieved)	Rank	% +65 in WACE (Note: Based on the number of Stage 3 course enrolments in the school where a WACE course score of 65 or above was achieved)	% graduates (Note: Percentage of Year 12 cohort that graduated with a WACE certificate)	Notes
2015	17	20.05	21	45.16	96.37	
2014	15	20.42	16	46.94	97.25	
2013	17	15.95	20	40.39	96.70	
2012	17	17.21	21	46.03	97.22	
2011	10	24.02	12	59.11	99.13	
2010	20	16.93	33	51.07	97.60	
2009	22	40.29 (>75% minimum of one subject)	19	48.55 (64.6% or more)	98.42	

In 2017, Andreea Ioan won the Beazley Medal for the top ranked Vocational Education and Training student in Western Australia.

== Special programs ==
WSHS is one of 24 schools offering the Gifted and Talented (GAT) program with entry through centrally organised testing. The school offers a specialist fine arts course for Years 8 to 10 and a successful senior school art program. A specialist course in computing was the first of its kind in WA and has recently been expanded to include a multimedia stream. A specialist basketball course runs from Years 8 to 11 and offers students a TAFE Certificate II in Sport Coaching and Sport and Recreation. Both male and female teams have won multiple national championships. As of June 2019, Willetton SHS introduced a program called the eSports Club where all students can prepare for a sports competition and practice against other local schools. Some of the team names include WSHS eSports and DLGC.

=== Basketball Team Achievements ===
==== Championship Men (Open) ====
- Australian Schools Championships

(bronze) Third Place: 2017, 2018

== International relations ==
WSHS has a sister school relationship with the High School and Junior High School of University of Hyogo located in Kamigōri, Ako District, Hyogo Prefecture, Japan. Cultural exchanges between the two schools commenced in 1995 and a collaborative international partnership was established in 2005. WSHS maintains relationships that provide opportunities for French and Italian language students to study overseas.

== Incidents ==
On 11 May 2020, a 16-year-old male student was charged with illegal possession of a firearm after taking a gel blaster and a knife into the school. Crime Stoppers received a tipoff regarding the gun before the officers were called to the school at about 2:30 pm. In a statement "the Education Department said [...] no other students were impacted and the situation was well managed."

On 5 May 2022, a female student pled guilty to a charge of attempted murder after she stabbed a female teacher at WSHS in November 2021. The girl had a female accomplice, who pled not guilty to the same charge. Although the intent was to wound the teacher fatally, the teacher was not injured seriously, receiving a 1-centimetre (0.39 in) wound near the left armpit. The attacking girl was 14 years old at the time of the stabbing, and the girl that assisted was 13. In September 2022 the attacker was "sentenced to three years and one month detention, but will be eligible for parole after serving 15 months, a sentence [...] lower than it could have been due to the poor conditions at Banksia Hill"; the crime carries "a maximum penalty of life imprisonment." The accomplice was sentenced 12 days earlier "to 11 months in juvenile detention, but she may be released after serving half of that", with this sentence also lower than it could have been because of the poor conditions at Banksia Hill.

== Notable alumni ==
- Ebony Antonio – Australian rules football player
- James Hayward – Member of the Western Australian Legislative Council from 2021 until disqualified in 2023
- Ben Henshall – Basketball player
- Luke Jackson – Australian rules football player
- Daniel Johnson – Basketball player
- Shane Osborn – First Australian to earn two Michelin stars, and runner-up in the first season of The Final Table filmed for Netflix
- Luke Travers – Australian basketball player
- Rhys Vague – Basketball player
- James Wan – Australian producer, screenwriter and director

== See also ==
- List of schools in the Perth metropolitan area
