= Hillcrest Christian College =

Coordinates: 28°06′13″S 153°23′51″E

- Reedy Creek, Gold Coast, Queensland, Australia

Information
- School type: Private
- Motto: Excellence in Christ
- Established: 1982
- Principal: Jeff Davis
- Colours: Red, white and blue
- Website: http://hillcrest.qld.edu.au/

Hillcrest Christian College is an independent Christian school located in Reedy Creek, Gold Coast, Queensland, Australia.

The medium-size, co-educational, Christian school has approximately 2300 students enrolled in each semester with students ranging from Pre-Prep to Year 12. There is also an on-campus Kindy and Outside School Hours Care. Hillcrest Christian College is a member of the CSA (Christian Schools Organisation), which defines the school as a locally governed and not-for-profit organisation.

== History ==
The origins of Hillcrest Christian College can be traced back to the Palm Beach Baptist Church, which was established in 1928, and the church congregation began planning concepts for a Christian school in the 1970s. Southern Gold Coast Christian Community School was opened on the Palm Beach Baptist Church grounds in 1982 with just 37 students ranging from years 1-7 and operated there until 1986 when the school relocated to Reedy Creek. The school was then renamed Hillcrest Christian College and retained a close connection with the Palm Beach Baptist Church until it also relocated to a site near the school and became the Reedy Creek Baptist Church in 2001.

The school has had four principals since its opening:

- Andrew Mackie (Founding Principal): 1982–1990
- Stuarte Kerdel: 1991–2001
- Keith Francis: 2002–2014
- Jeff Davis: 2015–current

In 2021, Hillcrest introduced a Middle Learning Community which created four distinct learning areas: Kindy, Junior, Middle and Senior Learning Communities.

== Academia ==
=== Partnerships with universities ===
Hillcrest Christian College has partnerships with Griffith University and Bond University. In 2013, 32% of Year 12 graduates completed vocational studies while in Year 12. In addition, five scholarships and guaranteed entries were awarded to students in 2013 to these universities.

=== Gifted & Talented ===
Hillcrest Christian College offers a dedicated Gifted & Talented program to cater for students who have been identified as significantly more advanced academically than their age group.

== International ==
International enrolments make up 6% of the total student population at Hillcrest Christian College. The school implemented its International Student Program in 1996 and teaches English as a Second Language (ESL) to students currently speaking:

- English
- Chinese
- Japanese
- South Korean
- Taiwan(China)
- Hong Kong(China)
- Vietnam
- Thailand

== Co-curricular ==
=== Sport (HCC) ===
Hillcrest Christian College provides a range of sporting activities to all students including:

- Physical Education
- Aquatics Program
- Interschool Sport
- Outside School Hours Sport
- Interhouse Carnivals

Hillcrest run a successful Basketball Excellence Program, which culminated in a 2016 senior boys state championship and a third-place finish in the national championships. The College also claimed the 2019 Primary Female AFL Schools Cup State Championship, coached by 251-game former AFL player Matthew Lappin.

==== AFL Team Achievements ====
===== Junior Female (Years 7-9) =====
- AFL Queensland Schools Cup

(silver) Runners Up: 2022

==== Basketball Team Achievements ====
===== Championship Men (Open) =====
- Australian Schools Championships

(bronze) Third Place: 2016

===== Championship Women (Open) =====
- Australian Schools Championships

(silver) Runners Up: 2022

=== Arts (HCC) ===
Hillcrest Christian College offers an array of options for students wanting to pursue performing arts including:

- Dance Academy
- Drama
- Choral Program
- Choral Excellence Program
- College Musical
- Instrumental

== House system ==
Hillcrest Christian College has four houses that each student represents in the swimming, cross country and athletics carnival. Each house is named after a Christian missionary throughout history.

=== Carmichael (Red) ===
Amy Carmichael (1867–1951) was a Protestant Christian missionary in India who opened an orphanage and founded a mission in Dohnavur. She worked mostly with young ladies, some of whom were saved from forced prostitution and wrote thirty-five published books.

=== Flynn (Blue) ===
John Flynn (1880–1951) was an Australian Presbyterian minister who founded the Royal Flying Doctor Service (the world's first air ambulance). After studying to at Ormond College in Melbourne, he was made the first superintendent of the Australian Inland Mission. Flynn quickly established the need for medical care for those living in the Australian outback and opened a number of hospitals in the bush.

=== Greene (Green) ===
Betty Greene (1920–1997) used her love for flying for Christian mission work after serving with the Women Airforce Service Pilots in World War II. She served for 16 years in 12 different countries until her death in 1997.

=== Taylor (Yellow) ===
Hudson Taylor (1832–1905) was a British Protestant Christian missionary to China and founder of the China Inland Mission. During his 51 years in China he was responsible for bringing over 800 missionaries to China who opened 125 schools. Taylor was able to preach in several varieties of Chinese, including Mandarin, Chaozhou and the Wu dialects of Shanghai and Ningbo. He used these talents to prepare a written edition of the New Testament.

== Notable alumni ==
=== Arts ===
- Jessica Cooper, founder of the OHLIGUER jewellery brand worn by celebrities such as Madonna and Sabrina Carpenter

=== Entertainment ===
- Joe Davidson, actor in movies such as Anyone But You
- Apollo Jackson, TV personality, magician and actor in movies such as Thor: Ragnarok

=== Sport ===
- Sunny Lappin, Australian rules footballer with the Gold Coast Suns (AFLW)
- Ava Usher, Australian rules footballer with the Gold Coast Suns (AFLW)
- Flynn Cameron, basketball player with Melbourne United (NBL), New Zealand (FIBA)
- Tobias Cameron, basketball player with the Taranaki Airs (NZNBL)
- Izzy Wright, basketball player with the Melbourne Boomers (WNBL)
- Gideon Burnes, swimmer who won a silver medal at the 2023 World Aquatics Junior Championships
