= Cabra Dominican College =

Coordinates: 34.96838°S 138.58747°E

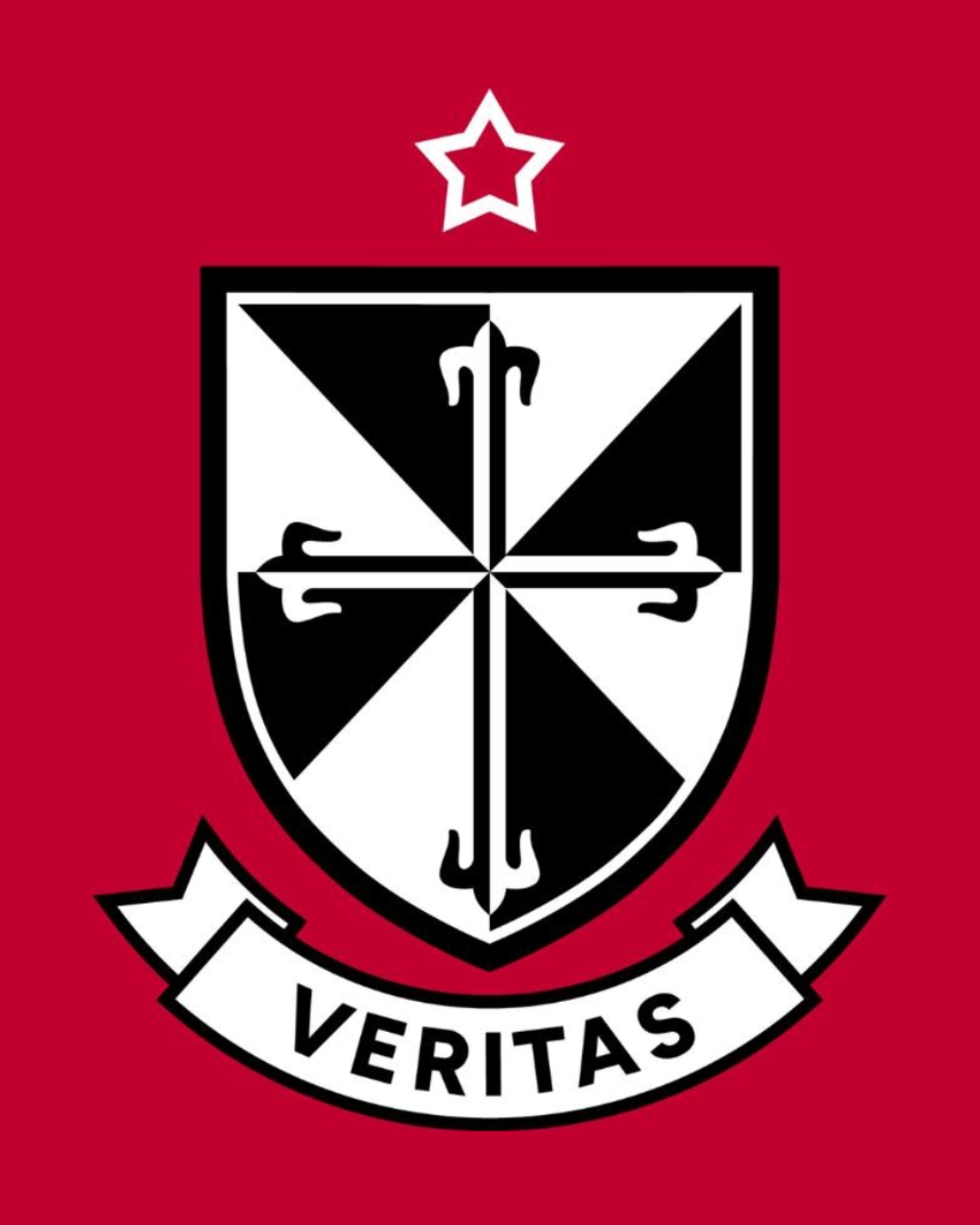

Location
- 225 Cross Road; Cumberland Park, South Australia; Australia

Information
- Type: Independent, co-educational, private, Catholic
- Motto: Veritas (Truth)
- Religious affiliations: Catholic Church; Dominican Order
- Patron saint: St Dominic de Guzman
- Established: 1886; 140 years ago
- Chairman: Mary-Ann Royle
- Principal: Helen Riekie
- Teaching staff: ~180
- Grades: 7–12
- Enrolment: ~1,200
- Houses: Boylan, Kavanagh, Moore, Murphy
- Colours: Cardinal red and gold
- Song: Hymn to St. Dominic
- Yearbook: Veritas Magazine
- Website: www.cabra.catholic.edu.au

Cabra Dominican College is a private, independent Catholic high school located at Cumberland Park, an inner-southern suburb in Adelaide, South Australia. It was established by an order of Dominican sisters from Cabra, Dublin in February 1886 with nine sisters, and caring for 37 boarders and 3-day girls. Originally offering a co-educational primary education and a high school education for girls, it began accepting boys into the high school in 1978.

The school caters for approximately 1,278 students and serves educational year grades from middle school to senior school (grade 7 to 12).

== History ==
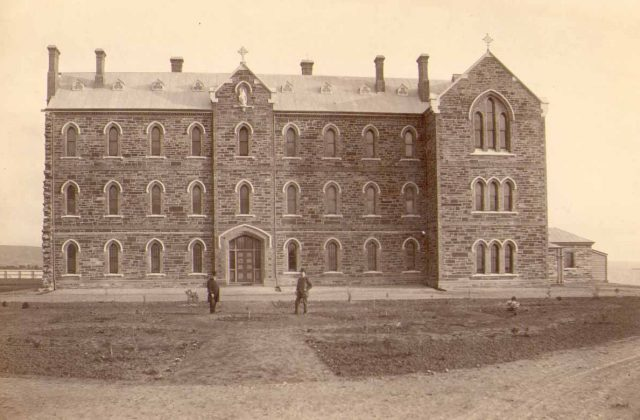
The Cabra convent building in 1887

In 1868, seven Dominican sisters were invited by the Bishop of Adelaide to visit the South Australian city. The sisters opened a day and boarding school in Franklin Street in inner-Adelaide. The school was moved to the current location in the suburb of Cumberland Park in 1886. At the time, the southern suburbs where Cumberland Park is located, was largely uninhabited farmland. The school was named after Cabra, Dublin, the mother house of the Dominican sisters in Ireland.

The foundation for the original Cabra building was first laid in March 1885. By the end of the year, the northern and western wings of the main building were established. The school officially opened in February 1886, with a total of nine sisters caring for 37 boarders and 3-day girls. There were an additional 71 girls in the intermediate school and most of these lived in South Australia. The school grew to over 93 boarders and 232-day pupils in the early 1950s. In 1978, the college itself began accepting boys. In 1999, the boarding school closed after over 110 years.

=== List of principals ===
Year	Name
1994–2002	Jeff Croser
2003–2011	John Neate
2011–2017	Brian Schumacher
2018–present	Helen Riekie

== House system ==
In 2017, the school's house system underwent a significant transformation. The four houses, which were previously utilised exclusively for Sports Day, were replaced with a new structure where each house functions more independently. Unlike the pre-2017 arrangement, where students were grouped by year level, the current system designates specific areas of the school to each house. For example, the northernmost building on campus, formerly allocated to senior students for home classrooms and lockers, is now designated as the home of Moore House. This building is named "Aquinas" in honor of Saint Thomas Aquinas.

Each house is overseen by two key staff members known as 'House Leaders' who provide guidance and support to students throughout their time at the college. Additionally, each house has a student leadership team, which includes two peer-elected senior House Captains from Year 12. They are supported by Year Level House Captains, representing students from Years 7 to 11.

The four houses are named after Dominican nuns who originally traveled from Ireland to Australia to establish the school. They are as follows:

=== Boylan ===
Named after Mother Mary Columba Boylan, O.P., who was sent to South Australia in 1875 to assist the sisters following the passing of Teresa Moore. She played a crucial role in managing the boarding school and later oversaw the completion of a full college in 1886. The house colors for Boylan are dark blue and light blue, known as "double blues."

=== Kavanagh ===
Named after Mother Mary Catherine Kavanagh, O.P., who assumed leadership of the college following the passing of Columba Boylan. She identified strongly with the Dominican tradition, as did many of the other sisters, which contributed to her reputation as a strong leader. The house colors for Kavanagh are green and gold.

=== Moore ===
Named after Mother Mary Teresa Moore, O.P., who led the founding group of Dominican sisters in establishing the college in 1868. As the first Prioress of St. Mary's Franklin Street, she oversaw the construction of a small girls' boarding school. The house colors for Moore are red and white.

=== Murphy ===
Named after Mother Mary Catherine Murphy, O.P., who served as an assistant to Teresa Moore. She played a vital role in helping the sisters overcome the challenges they faced, particularly following the excommunication of Saint Mary of the Cross MacKillop in 1871. The house colors for Murphy are purple and orange.

=== Sports Day ===
Since 2006, the school has hosted an annual Sports Day, which was restructured in 2017 alongside the introduction of the modern house system. Students have the opportunity to participate in a range of sports, with both victories and participation contributing to their house’s overall score. Some larger-scale or time-intensive events are held in advance of the main day.

Two major awards are presented during the event. The Main Cup, the most prestigious prize, is awarded to the house that accumulates the highest total points. The Spirit Cup is presented to the house that demonstrates the greatest sportsmanship and enthusiasm, including outstanding chants.

=== Sports Day winners ===
Year	House Cup Winner	Spirit Cup Winner
2017	Boylan	Moore
2018	Boylan	Kavanagh
2019	Murphy	Kavanagh
2020	Boylan	Murphy
2021	Kavanagh	Moore
2022	Kavanagh	Murphy
2023	Kavanagh	Moore
2024	Kavanagh	Boylan
2025	Kavanagh	Moore
2026	Kavanagh	Boylan

== Notable alumni ==
- Jason Gillespie, cricketer
- Brodie Grundy, Australian rules footballer
- Keeley Kustermann, Australian rules footballer
- Robyn Layton, judge
- Orianthi Panagaris, singer
- Margaret White, judge

== See also ==
- List of schools in South Australia
