= Keihan Bus =

Public transit company in Kyoto, Japan

KEIHAN BUS Co.Ltd.
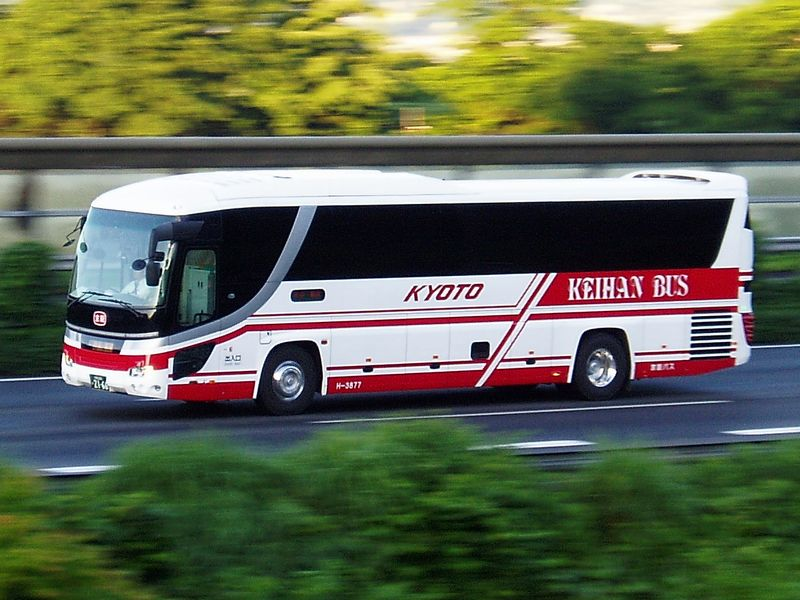
- Highway bus Tokyo Midnight Express Kyoto
- Parent: Keihan Electric Railway
- Founded: 1922 (as Momoyama Motor Co., Ltd.); 1924 (change corporation name to Keihan Bus)
- Headquarters: 5 Higashi-Kujo Minami-Ishidamachi Minami, Kyoto, Kyoto, Japan
- Service area: Kyoto and Osaka, Shiga
- Service type: Bus
- Chief executive: Kazuya Suzuki
- Website: http://www.keihanbus.co.jp/

The Keihan Bus Co. Ltd. (京阪バス株式会社, Keihan Basu Kabushiki-gaisha) is a bus company that operates within Osaka, in southern Kyoto, and Ōtsu. It is a subsidiary of the Keihan Group, which also runs Keihan Electric Railway.

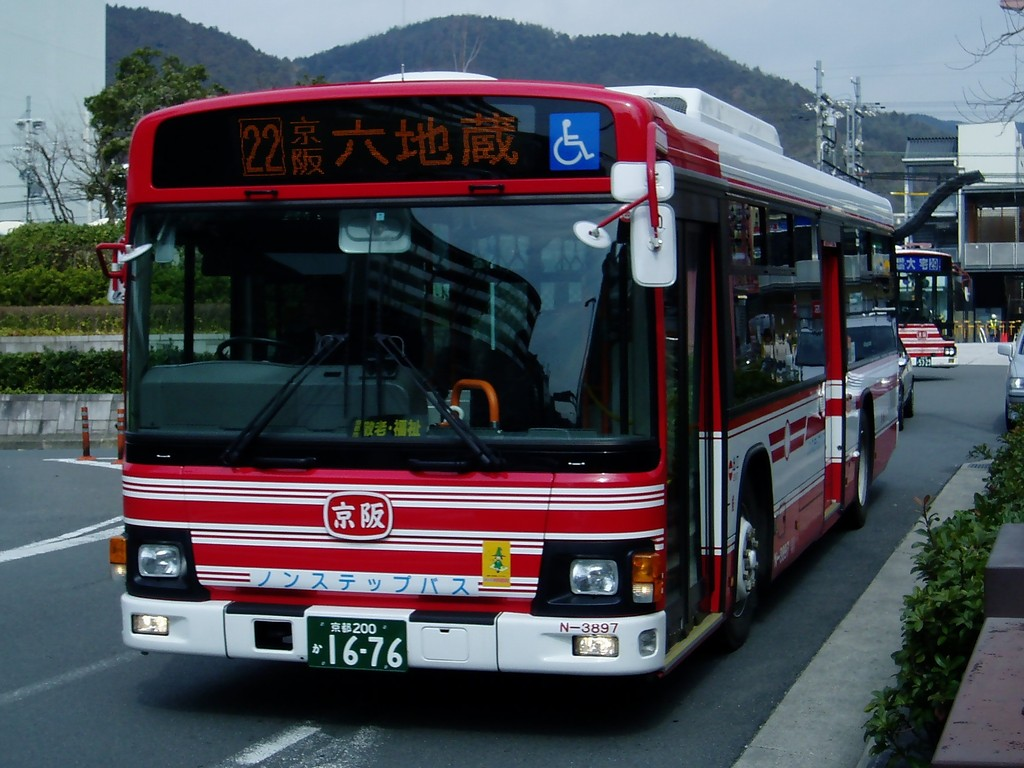
Typical red-and-white Keihan Bus at Yamashina Station

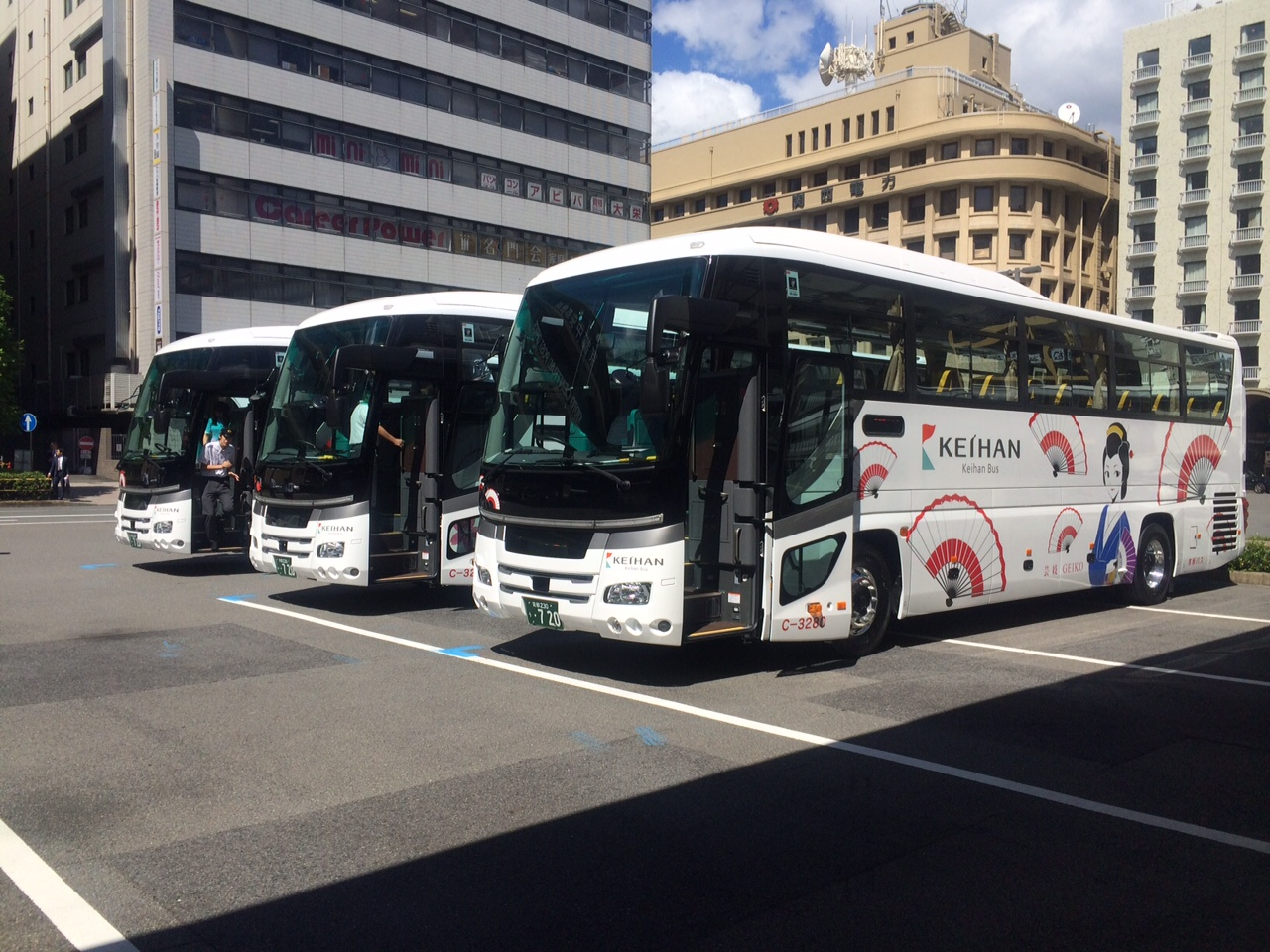
Sightseeing bus exclusively for tours of Kyoto

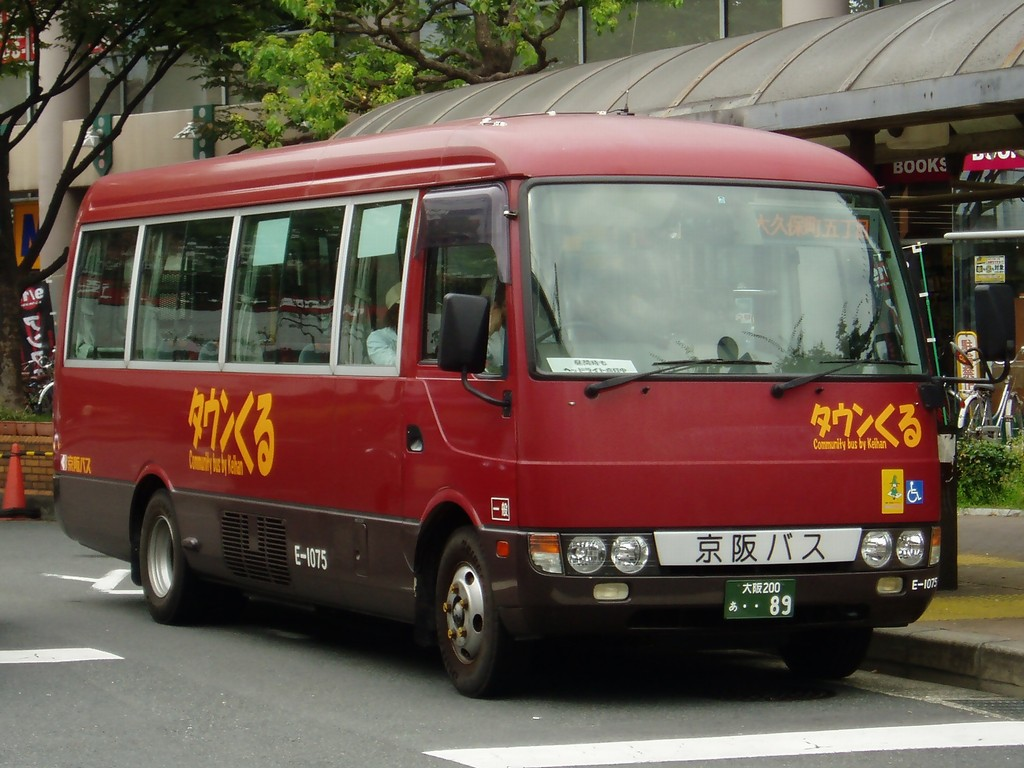
Community bus, Moriguchi

== History ==
Keihan Bus Company was established on 22 July 1922 as a taxi company called Momoyama Motor Co., Ltd.(桃山自動車株式会社). In 1924 it became a subsidiary of Keihan, which runs the Keihan Electric Railway. It later merged with other transportation companies, including Daigo Kisen and Jōhoku Motor Co. in 1930, and Keihan-Uji Kotsu and Keihan Uji Kotsu Tanabe in 2006. As a result of these mergers, Keihan Bus has acquired an extensive service area in Osaka, Kyoto and Shiga Prefecture.

== Local bus services ==
=== Offices ===
Keihan Bus offices attached to garages include:

- Yamashina Office
- Rakunan Office: There are route buses which run with Nara Kotsu.
- Kyotanabe Office
- Otokoyama Office
- Hirakata Office
- Takatsuki Office
- Katano Office
- Neyagawa Office
- Kadoma Office

=== Information desks ===
- Ishiyama Station Desk
- Yamashina Station Desk
- Kyoto Station Karasuma Exit Desk (sells only highway bus tickets)
- Kyoto Station Hachijo Exit Desk（sells only highway bus and sightseeing bus tickets）
- Hirakatashi Station Desk
- Korien Station Desk
- Neyagawashi Station Desk
- Moriguchishi Station Desk

=== Temporary sales offices ===
These type desks open at the beginning and end of each month.

- Hoshida Station Desk
- Rokujizō Station Desk
- Takatsukishi Station Desk

=== Bus terminals ===
- Enryaku-ji Bus Terminal
- Daigo Bus Terminal

== Subsidiary companies ==
=== Keihan Kyoto Kotsu ===
KEIHAN KYOTO KOTSU Co., Ltd.
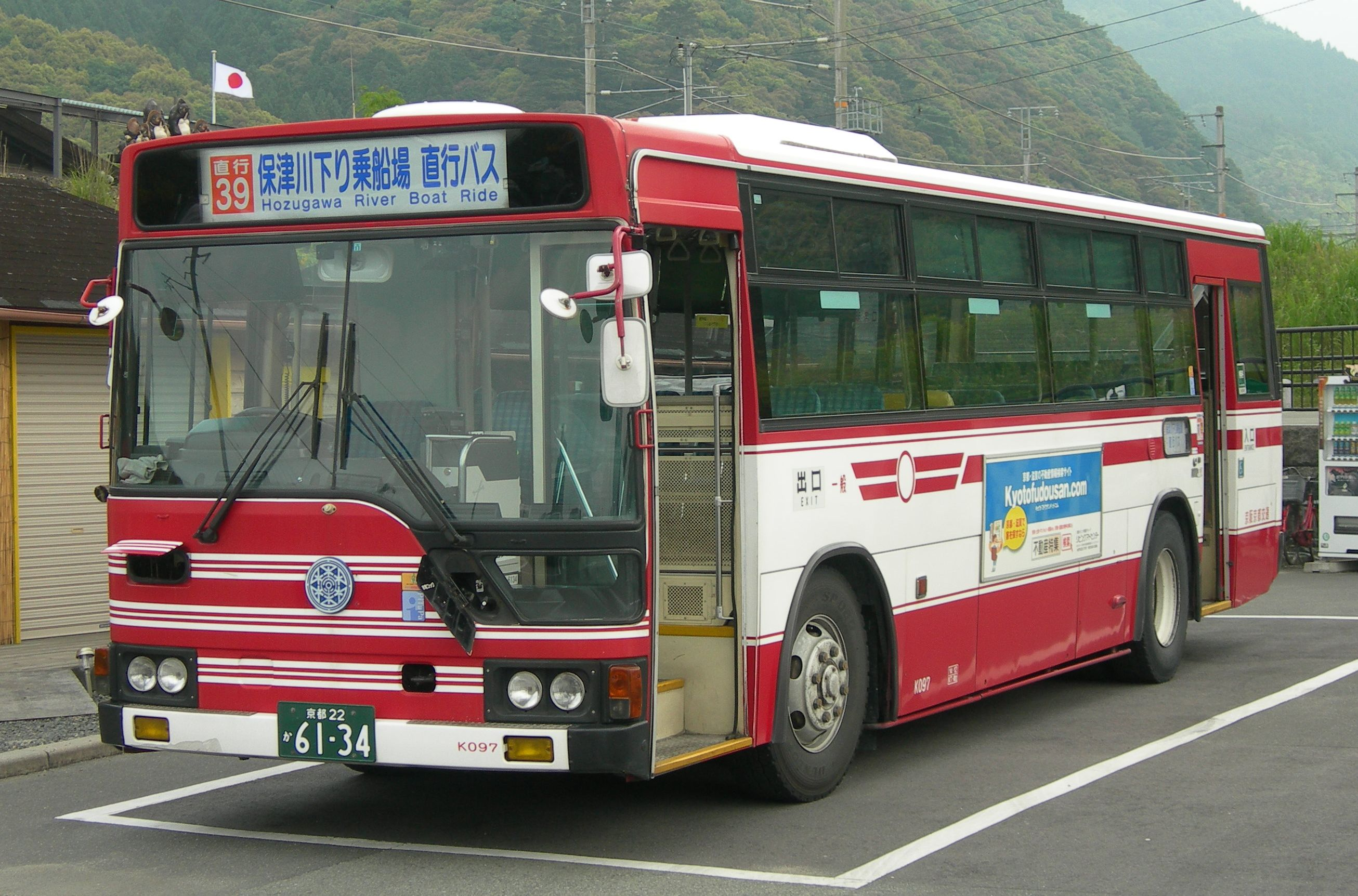
- Mitsubishi Fuso Aero Star
- Parent: Keihan Bus
- Founded: 1 April 2005
- Headquarters: 10 Shinomukaidani Shinocho Kameoka, Kyoto, Kyoto, Japan (621-0826 京都府亀岡市篠町篠向谷10番)
- Service area: Kyoto
- Service type: Bus
- Chief executive: Kazuhiro Sakamoto
- Website: http://www.keihankyotokotsu.jp/

The Keihan Kyoto Co.Ltd. (京阪京都交通株式会社, Keihan kyouto koutsu Kabushiki-gaisha) is a bus company within the Keihan Group, established in April 2005 by splitting from Keihan Bus. Its service areas are in the northwest of Kyoto.
