= Global Classroom =

International partnership of schools

The Global Classroom Partnership is an international partnership of schools. The roots of the partnership go as far back as 1989, but the partnership was officially established in 1996. Since then it created links with over 30 schools. It is one of the biggest international and long established school partnerships in the world.

Some examples of projects within the Global Classroom Partnership include:

== Global classroom conference ==
Since 1997, small groups of ten to twelve senior students from each partner school share ideas and information using Global Classroom's website in preparation for an annual Conference hosted on a rotating basis by one of the partner schools. Families of students and staff provide home stay opportunities and a program enabling sharing of work prepared in advance along with cultural and sightseeing is arranged by the host school.

List of the conferences up to date

- 1997 - GC Conference in Shetland Islands, UK
- 1998 - GC Conference in Ånge, Sweden
- 1999 - GC Conference in Cape Town, South Africa
- 2000 - GC Conference in Nara, Japan
- 2001 - GC Conference in Diepholz, Germany
- 2002 - GC Conference in Zlín, Czech Republic
- 2003 - GC Conference in Lerwick, Shetland Islands, UK
- 2004 - GC Conference in Ånge, Sweden
- 2005 - GC Conference in Cape Town, South Africa
- 2006 - GC Conference in Nara, Japan
- 2007 - GC Conference in Diepholz, Germany
- 2008 - GC Conference in Zlín, Czech Republic
- 2009 - GC Conference in Shetland Islands, UK
- 2010 - GC Conference in Ridgewood, NJ, US
- 2011 - GC Conference in Ånge, Sweden
- 2012 - GC Conference in Cape Town, South Africa
- 2013 - GC Conference in Diepholz, Germany
- 2014 - GC Conference in Zlín, Czech Republic
- 2015 - GC Conference in Shetland Islands, UK
- 2016 - GC Conference in Ridgewood, NJ, US
- 2017 - GC Conference in Canberra, Australia
- 2018 - GC Conference in Ånge, Sweden
- 2019 - GC Conference in Cape Town, South Africa
- 2020 - GC conference postponed due to the COVID-19 pandemic
- 2021 - GC Conference in Diepholz, Germany; online conference
- 2022 - GC Conference in Canberra, Australia; online conference
- 2023 - GC Conference in Zlín, Czech Republic; online conference
- 2024 - GC Conference in Lerwick, Shetland Islands, UK
- 2025 - GC Conference in Muskiz, Spain
- 2026 - GC Conference in Ånge, Sweden

Only the core schools attend the conference event, however there are also guest schools present.

== Learning school - student research ==
Since 1999 the Global Classroom Partnership has enabled a senior student from each of the schools to join together as a small international team of student researchers led by two graduate coordinators to research aspects of learning and teaching in each school. With advice from Professor John MacBeath, Head of Leadership Education at Cambridge University this student research known as The Learning School also includes schools in Malmo Sweden and Canberra Australia in addition to the Global Classroom core schools.

The Learning School project is one school self-evaluation model. School self-evaluation which engages students redresses outdated democratic imbalances in evaluation, encourages students to be participative and active contributors to learning evaluation and to be more responsible learners.

The project has a uniquely international dimension, as the members which make up the research group represent the schools of an international partnership of schools known as the Global Classroom. Those nominated to become Learning School participants are typically either current or recent high school students. Over the course of ten months, the group conducts research into learning issues in each partnership school - taking them to a diverse range of countries and social, cultural and economic situations. This translates to a rich social, cultural, personal and academic learning experience for group members in particular, but also for students in participant schools, host families, wider communities and experts.

== Extended exchange ==
Extended Exchange goes back to 1989 when the first links were established. The Global Partnership of schools offers senior students from each of the schools the opportunity to spend extended periods of study at any of the schools in the partnership. Ideally if reciprocal exchange arrangements can apply a senior student from one school swaps host family and school for an extended period of study and residence. The programme depends on the willingness of families of students to offer hospitality to visiting students. Students usually can spend up to one year in the chosen country and school.

== Video conferencing ==
Since 2003 Anderson High School has been sharing aspects of learning and teaching by video conferencing. This began as a Future Learning and Teaching project involving senior students sharing Advanced Higher courses – Maths with Nara Women’s Secondary School Japan, History and Modern Studies with South Peninsula High School Cape Town South Africa and Higher German with Graf Friedrich Schule Diepholz.

The Video Conferencing project makes use of an advanced video conferencing technology. The video-conferencing sessions are an important part of learning and teaching within the Global Classroom and the partnership is currently extending the subjects and areas where it uses this technology.

== Sharing perspectives ==
Sharing Perspectives aims to partner each class group of 12- and 13-year-olds at Anderson High School with a class group from each of the schools. The class groups work in and across subjects based on the following themes:

- To hear ourselves as others hear us - structured around English lessons
- To see ourselves as others see us – structured around Social Subjects
- What is a House and Home? – structured around Art & Design, Technology and Science

Students will share ideas, planning and preparations using the Blog / Discussion Forums with the sharing of applications materials work and outcomes integrated to learning and teaching.

== Shared images - Britain, Europe, and global ==
A group of six Anderson High School students aged 13 – 18 began sharing Images of themselves, their school and community with similar groups of students from Hawick High School, Ballyclare High School in Northern Ireland and Kidbrooke School in Greenwich London. As well as sharing images of Britain small groups of students aged 12 to 18 from partner schools in Czech Republic, Germany and Sweden will share Images of Europe. In the same format, this will become a Global Sharing Images project.

== Enterprise education ==
Enterprise Education is a new emerging project within the Global Classroom Partnership. A senior student from each of the partner schools along with a student from a new potential partner school – Trenton High School / West Campus in Trenton New Jersey

USA have formed an International Enterprise and Development Team. Led by a Graduate Student and working in partnership with Shetland Catch and COPE Shetland the team will undertake market research for Shetland Catch and learn skills of working with young people with support needs from COPE Shetland and share these skills with an NGO Rainbow Trust in Hermanus South Africa.

== Asn ==
Sharing learning, teaching and living with additional support needs students.

A group of students with additional support needs from Anderson High School and from Minervaskolan in Ange Sweden exchanged information, material ideas and took part in video conferencing in preparation for exchange visits . For the Swedish students there was experience of early summer in Shetland and for Shetland students late winter in the middle of Sweden. Great experiences for all with plans to continue but with planning time during 2006/7.
