= SPring-8 =

Japanese physics research institute

Coordinates: 34°56′41″N 134°25′38″E

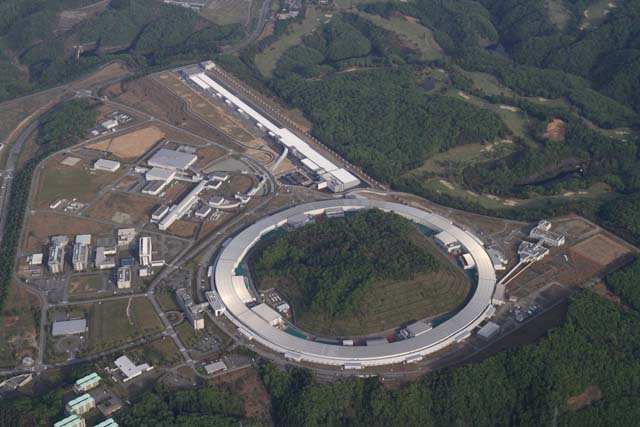
- Aerial view of the SPring-8 facility

General properties
- Accelerator type: Storage ring
- Beam type: Electron
- Target type: Light source

Beam properties
- Maximum energy: 8 GeV
- Maximum current: 100 mA

Physical properties
- Circumference: 1,436 metres (4,711 ft)
- Location: Sayō, Hyōgo
- Institution: JASRI, RIKEN
- Dates of operation: 1997 – present

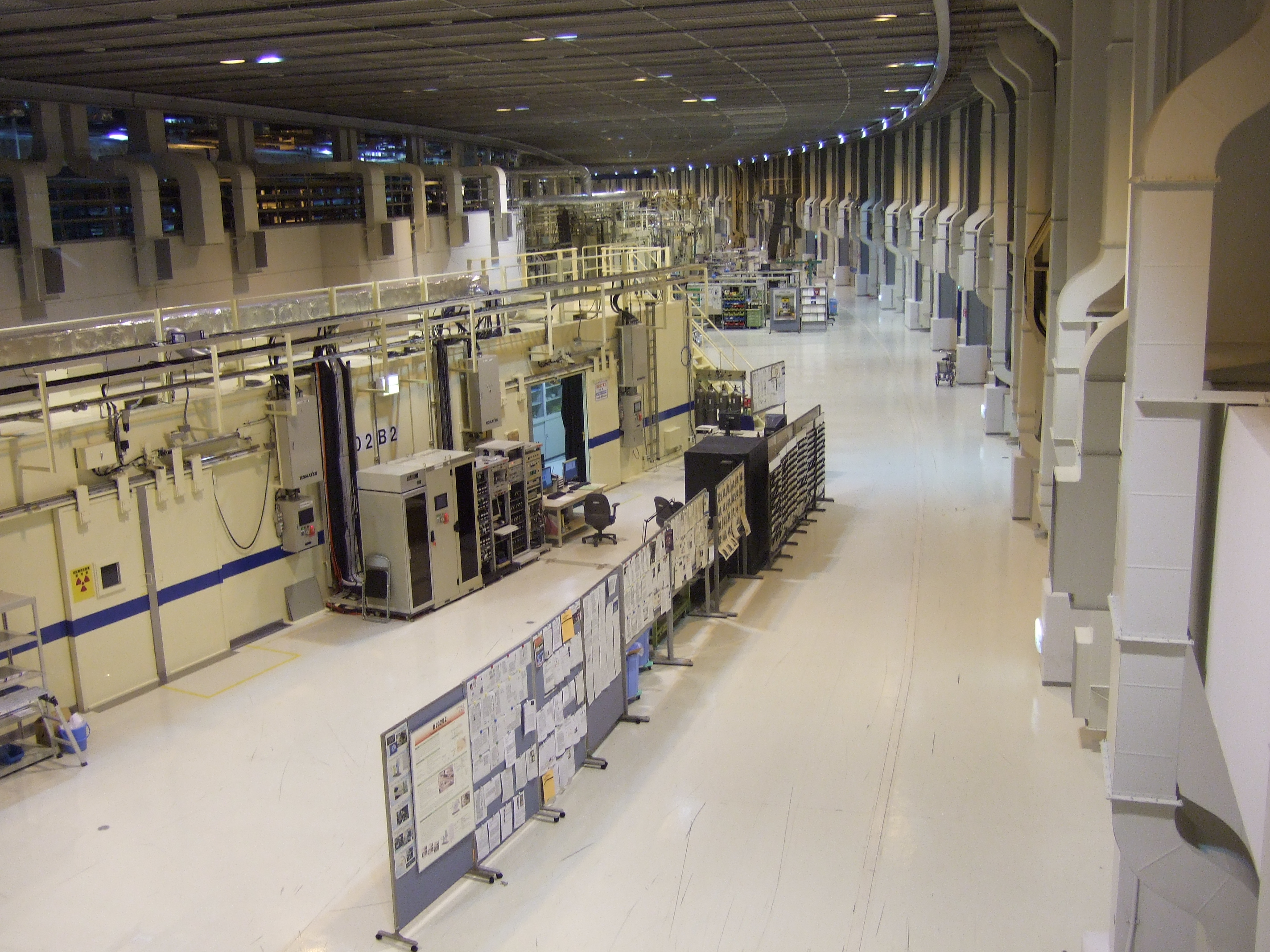
Inside the SPring-8 facility

SPring-8 (an acronym of Super Photon Ring – 8 GeV) is a synchrotron radiation facility located in Sayo Town, Sayo District, Hyōgo Prefecture, Japan, which is the main facility of Harima Science Garden City. It was developed jointly by RIKEN and the Japan Atomic Energy Research Institute, and is owned and managed by RIKEN, and run under commission by the Japan Synchrotron Radiation Research Institute. The machine consists of a storage ring containing an 8 GeV electron beam. On its path around the storage ring, the beam passes through insertion devices to produce synchrotron radiation with energies ranging from soft X-rays (300 eV) up to hard X-rays (300 keV). The synchrotron radiation produced at SPring-8 is used for materials analysis and biochemical protein characterization by many Japanese manufacturers and universities.

Together with the Advanced Photon Source at Argonne National Laboratory and the Cornell High Energy Synchrotron Source at Cornell University in the United States, the European Synchrotron Radiation Facility in Grenoble, France, and PETRA at DESY in Hamburg, Germany, it is one of the five large (beam energy greater than 5 GeV) synchrotron radiation facilities in the world.

== Research ==
The Laser Electron Photon Experiment at SPring-8 (LEPS) is an experiment producing high-energy (GeV) photon beams by the inverse Compton scattering of photons upon the 8 GeV electrons of the SPring-8 synchrotron. These are then used for various particle physics experiments on hadrons. The first beam was produced in 1999, and data-taking commenced in 2000.

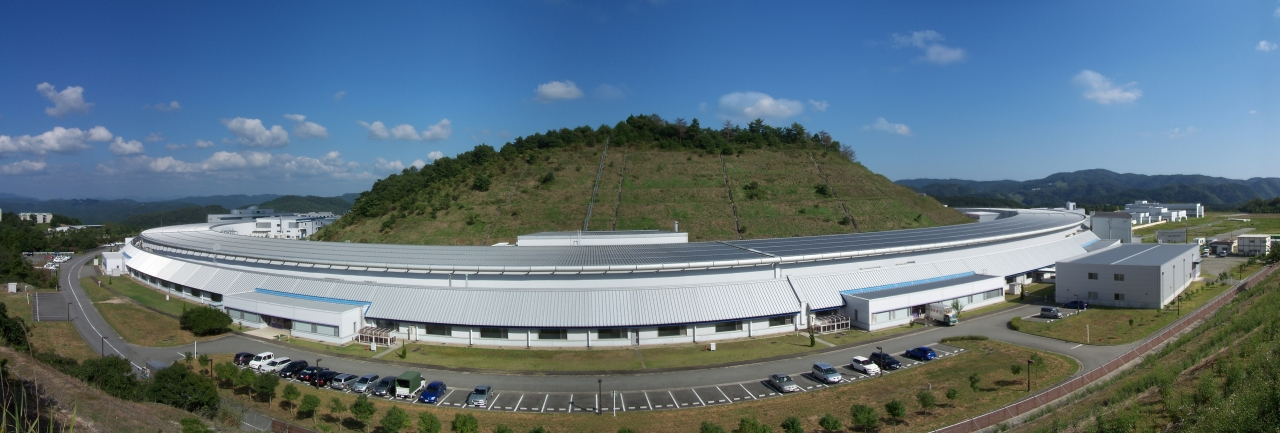
The SPring-8 circumference ring facility

The collaboration is known for their reports of a resonance which they interpret as a Θ^{+} pentaquark candidate made of two up quarks, two down quarks and a strange antiquark (uudds̅). The 2008 Review of Particle Physics of the Particle Data Group ruled out the existence of this resonance, but new reports from LEPS indicate that the resonance could be seen in the γd → K^{+}K^{−}pn channel.

== Use by police ==
The materials analysis at SPring-8 can be used as forensics to identify substances for police investigations by detecting the types and combinations of impurities. For example, in the 1998 Wakayama curry poisoning incident, the arsenic used as the poisoning agent in a communal pot of curry contained trace impurities of bismuth and antimony, which were also present in arsenic found in the perpetrator's home.

In another case, evidence from SPring-8 led to the arrest of three former members of the Aum Shinrikyo cult suspected in the 1995 shooting of Takaji Kunimatsu, Japan's head of the National Police Agency at the time. Like the curry poisoning incident, impurities in the metal traces in the coat of a suspect were matched to impurities in the gun used in the shooting.

== In popular culture ==
In the Ghost in the Shell: S.A.C. 2nd GIG anime series, SPring-8 is mentioned several times, and is the facility where the character Ishikawa takes a sample of weapons-grade Plutonium to be analyzed to verify its source.

In Salvation of a Saint, a piece of evidence is sent to SPring-8 for analysis.

== See also ==
- List of synchrotron radiation facilities
