= Shinki Bus =

Transport company

Shinki Bus Co., Ltd.
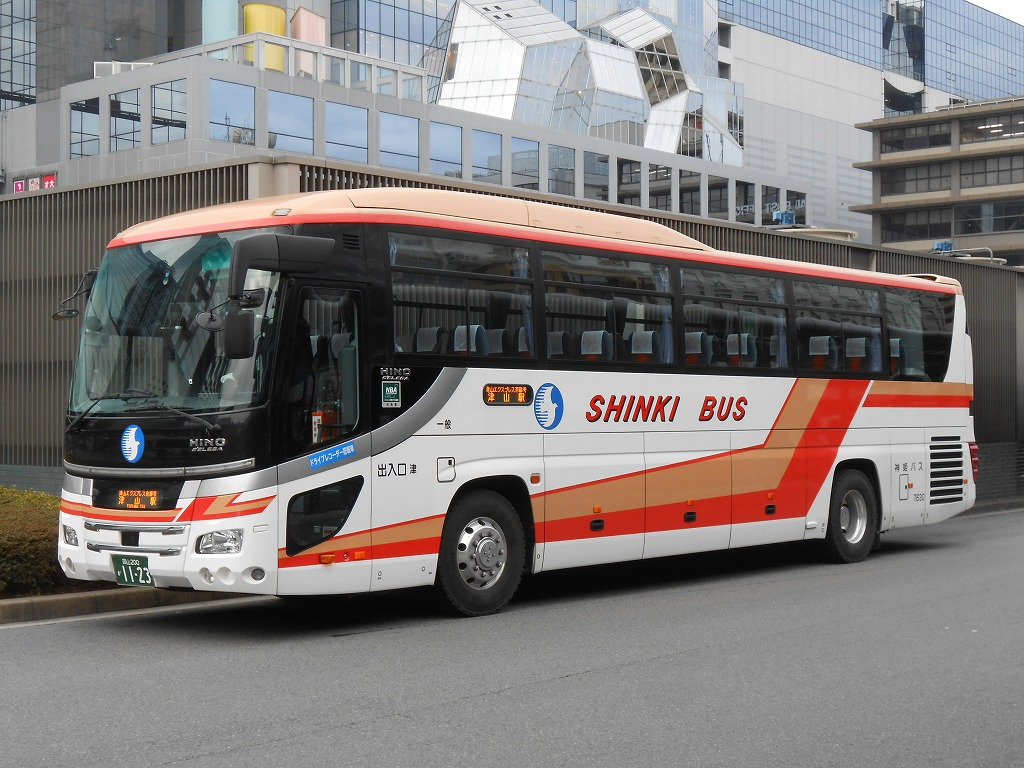
- Highway bus "Tsuyama-express Kyoto" (Tsuyama-Kyoto)
- Native name: 神姫バス株式会社 (Shinkibasu kabushikigaisha)
- Industry: Public transport and tourism
- Founded: October 3, 1927
- Headquarters: Himeji, Japan
- Area served: Hyogo prefecture (core business)
- Key people: President Makoto Nagao
- Net income: Non-consolidated: 1,033 million yen Consolidated: 1,534 million yen
- Total equity: 30.86 million shares
- Number of employees: 3147
- Website: www.shinkibus.co.jp

Shinki Bus Co., Ltd is a transport company based in Himeji, Japan, operating local bus services in Hyōgo Prefecture and other services mainly related to transport and tourism.

== History ==
The company was founded on 10 March 1927 under the name of Shinki Automobile ( 神 姫 自動 車 株式会社, Shinki Jidôsha Kabushikigaisha ) in Kobe. In 1947 the company moved and settled in Himeji, renamed as Shinki Gōdō Jidosha Kabushikigaisha (神姫合同自動車株式会社). In 1956, the company changed its name back to its original name. In May 1972, the company again modifies its name to become Shinki Bus, the current name.

== Vehicles ==
Currently, four models of Mitsubishi Fuso, Isuzu, Hino, Nissan Diesel (then "UD Trucks"), Nissan Civilian, Toyota Coaster, Toyota Hiace are introduced. Electric cars and high-speed cars were unified in MFTBC for a long time, but in 2005 two Hino and Selega were introduced. The most noteworthy point in coloring is the painting of charter cars. This was introduced in 1990, graphic designer Kazumasa Nagai designed that was requested to, in the article of the bus magazine is that it was also introduced as a "designer brand tour bus".The earlier chartered car design has been used as a design for high-speed vehicles for daytime even after that. The night express bus is a design that arranged Himeji Castle. In the first vehicle, the base color was a blue color, but the base color has been changed when updating the vehicle. The nickname of "Orange Arrow Strand SANDA" was publicly recruited and named. Shin-Sanda Station and Mita Station part of the pre-arrival and departure has been used in routes, capacity has become from usual route bus from about 40 people to 116 people. Regular sightseeing bus "Sky Bus Kobe" with open top bus borrows Neo Plan Skyliner and Neo Plan Space Liner of "Sky Bus Tokyo" from Hinomaru Auto Industry Co., Ltd.

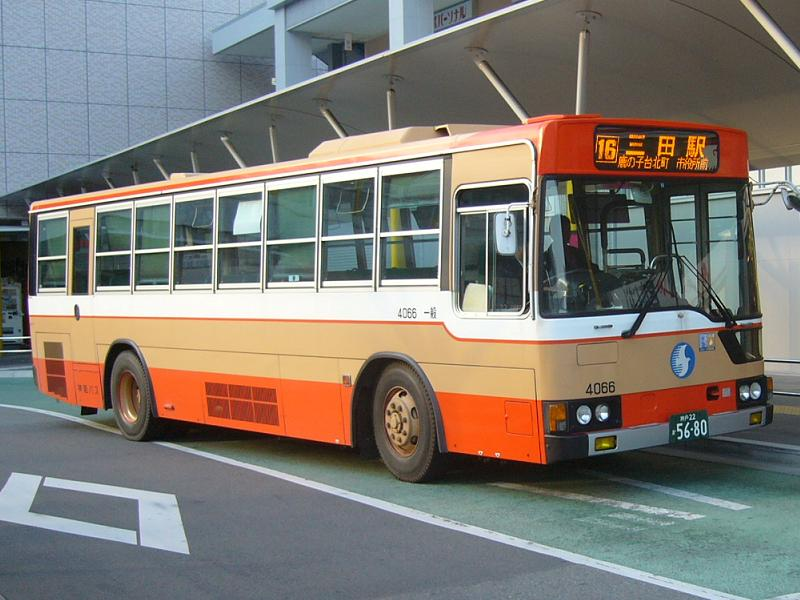

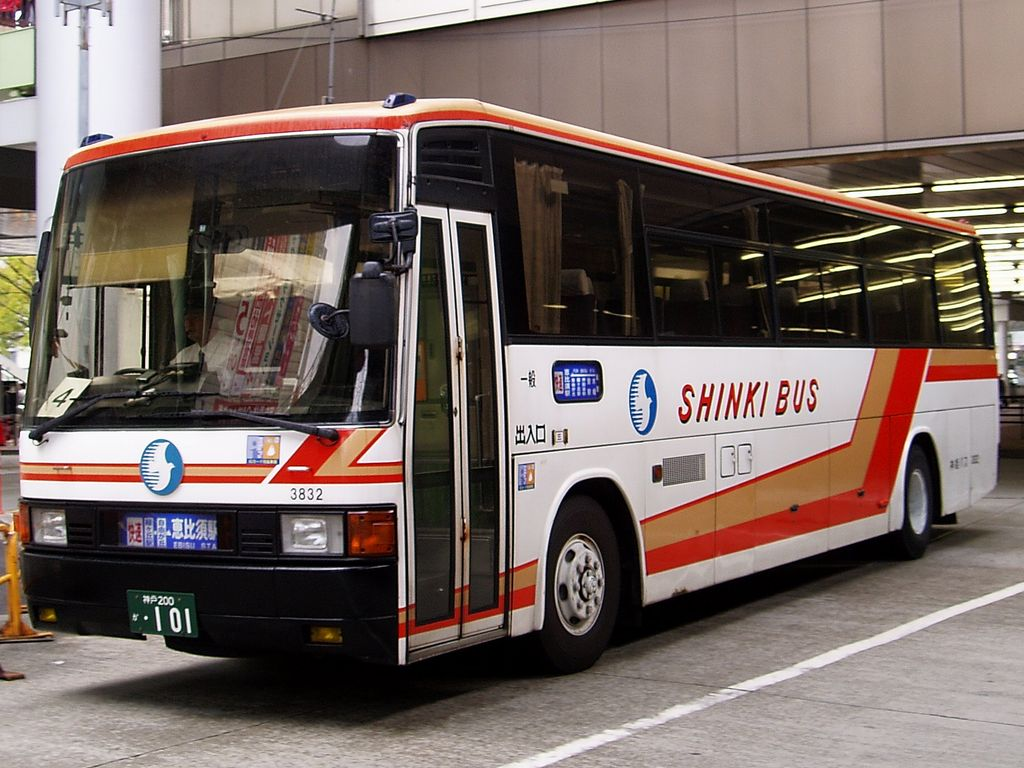

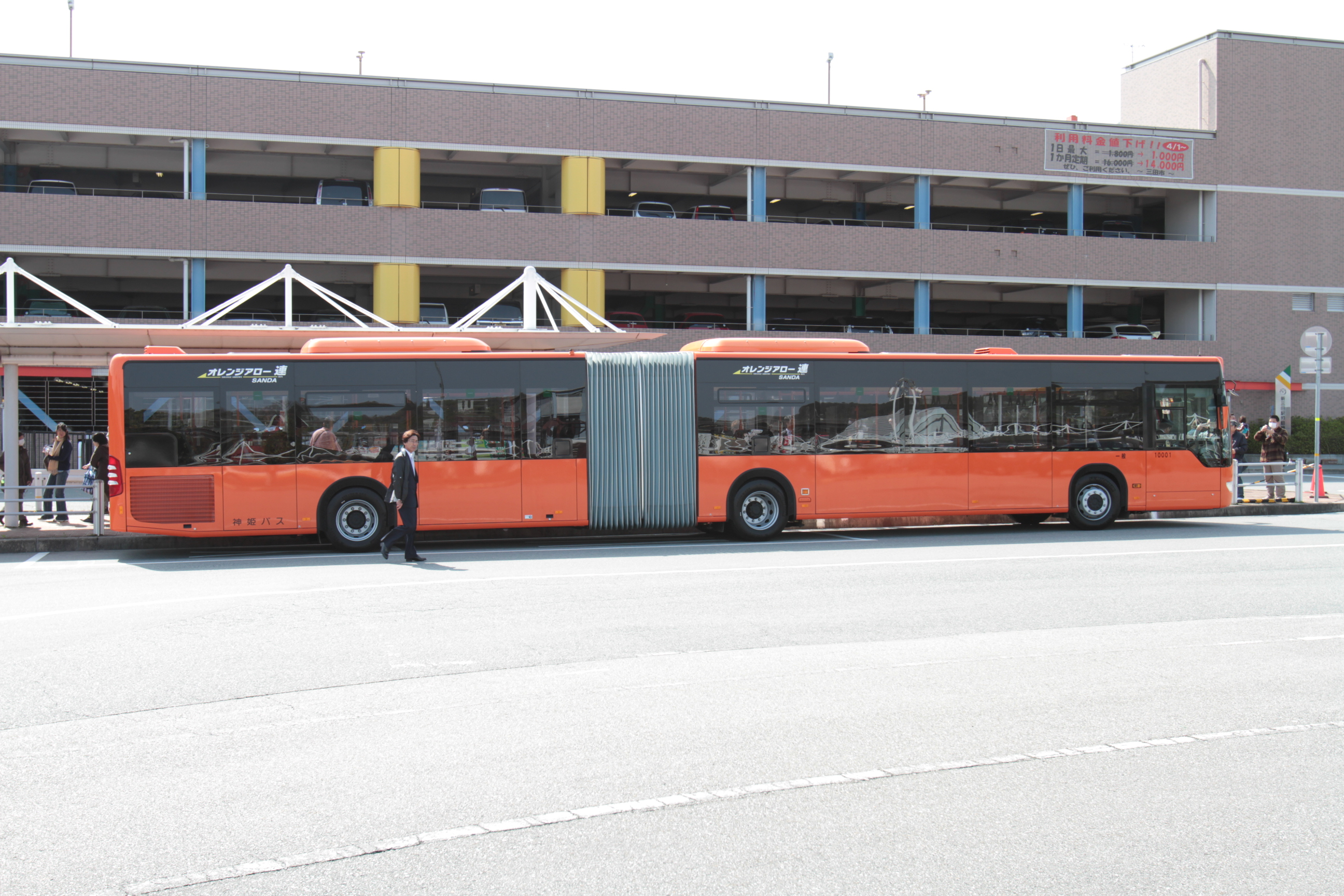

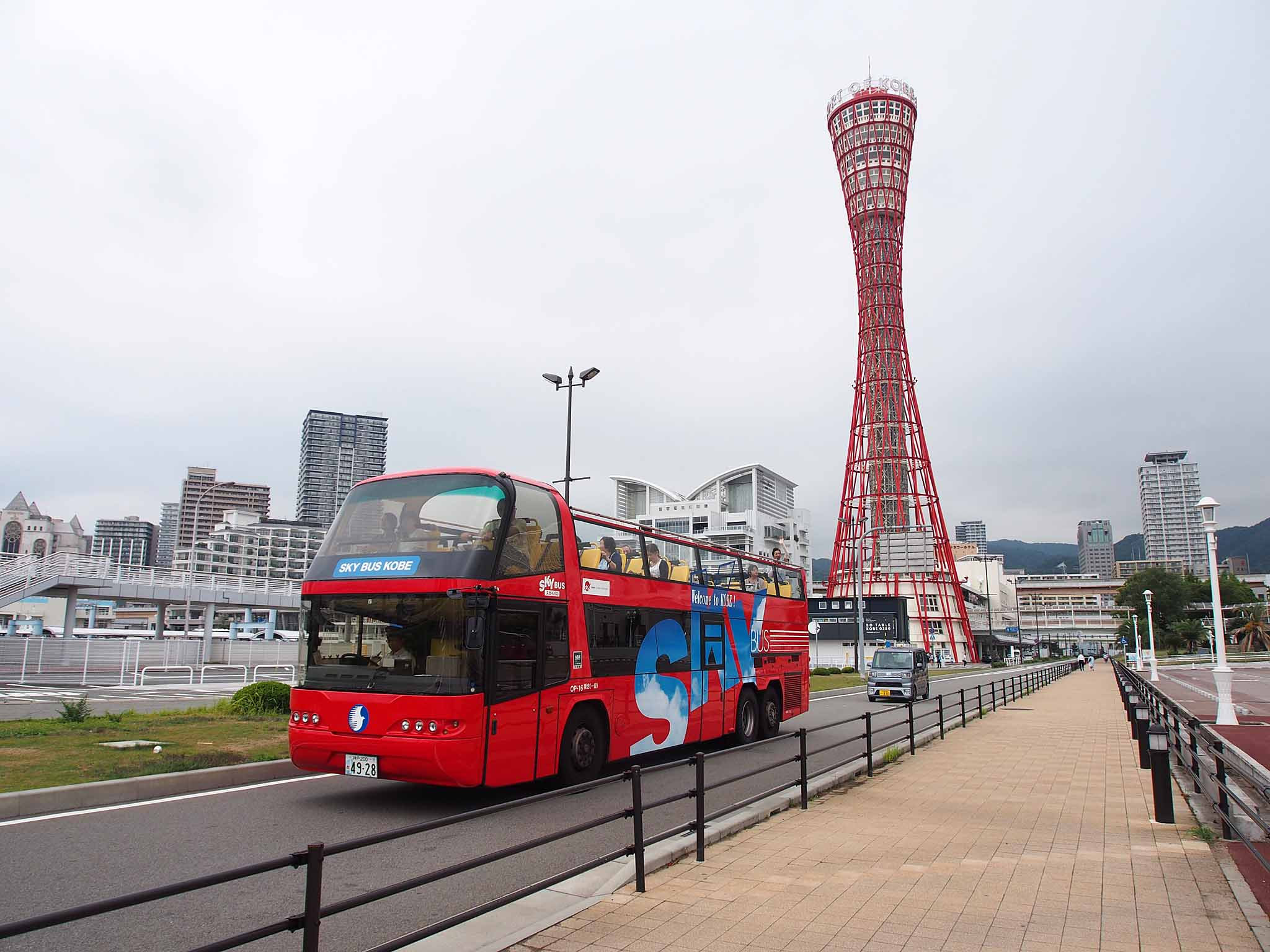

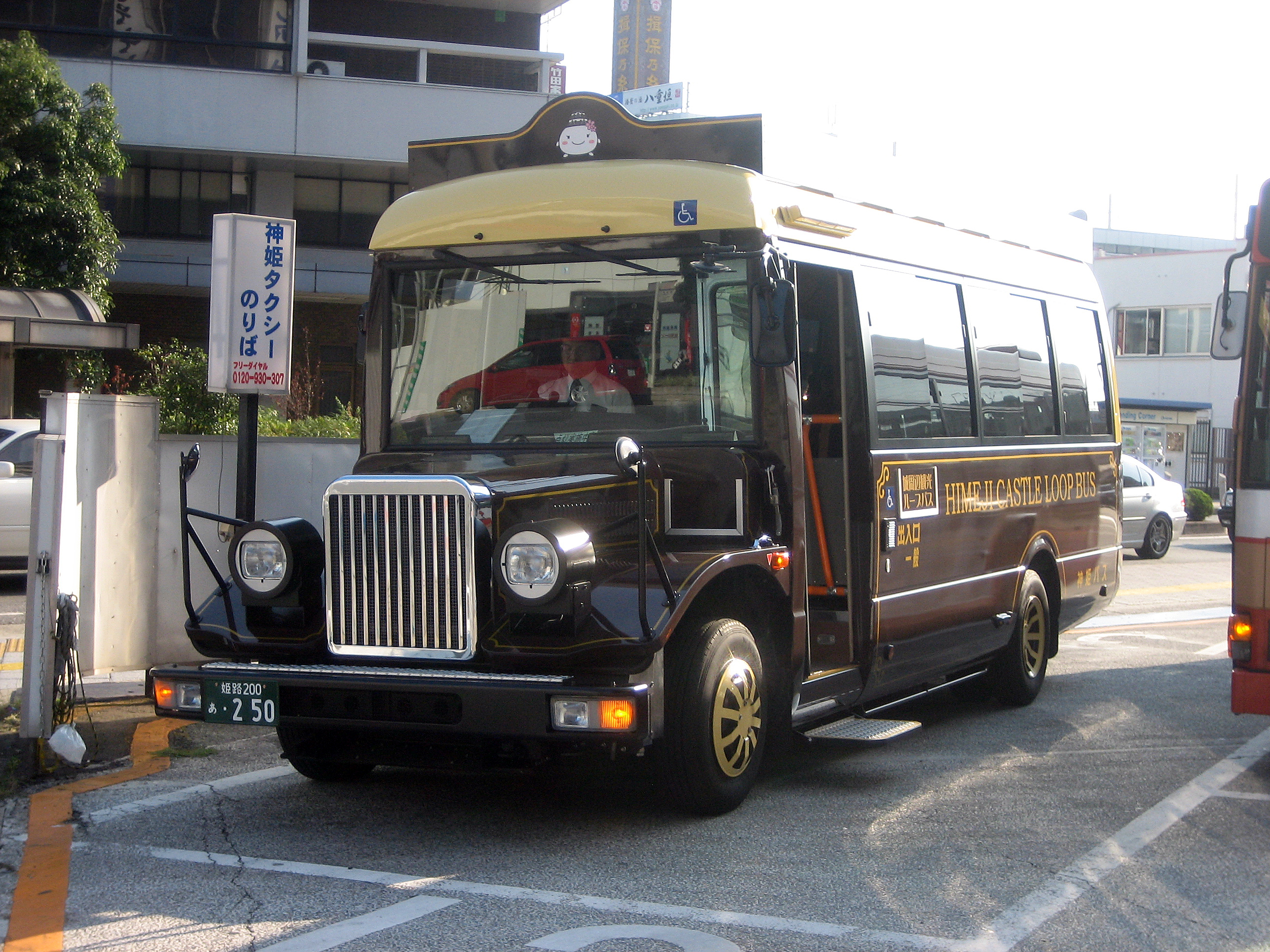

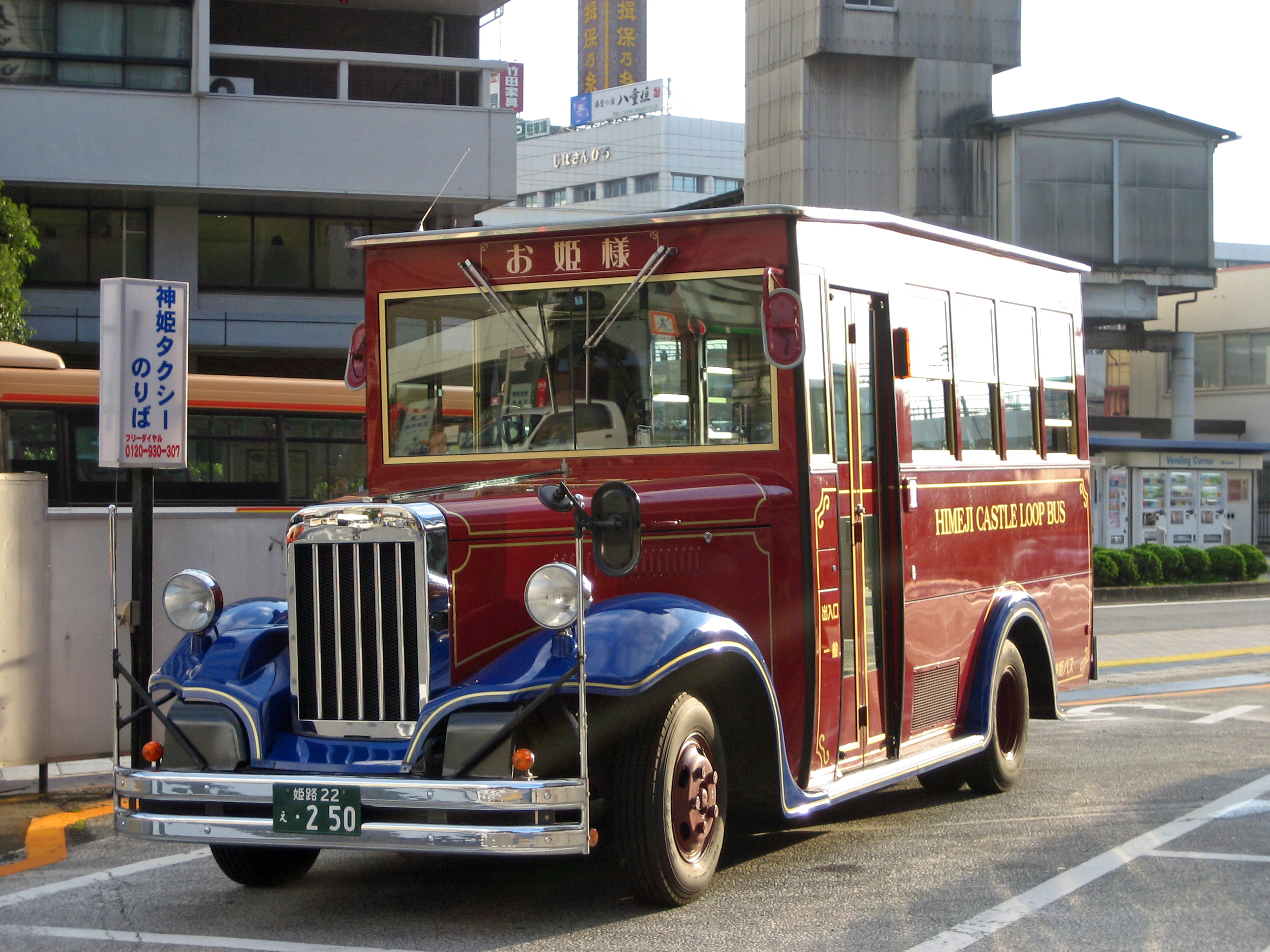

== Group companies ==
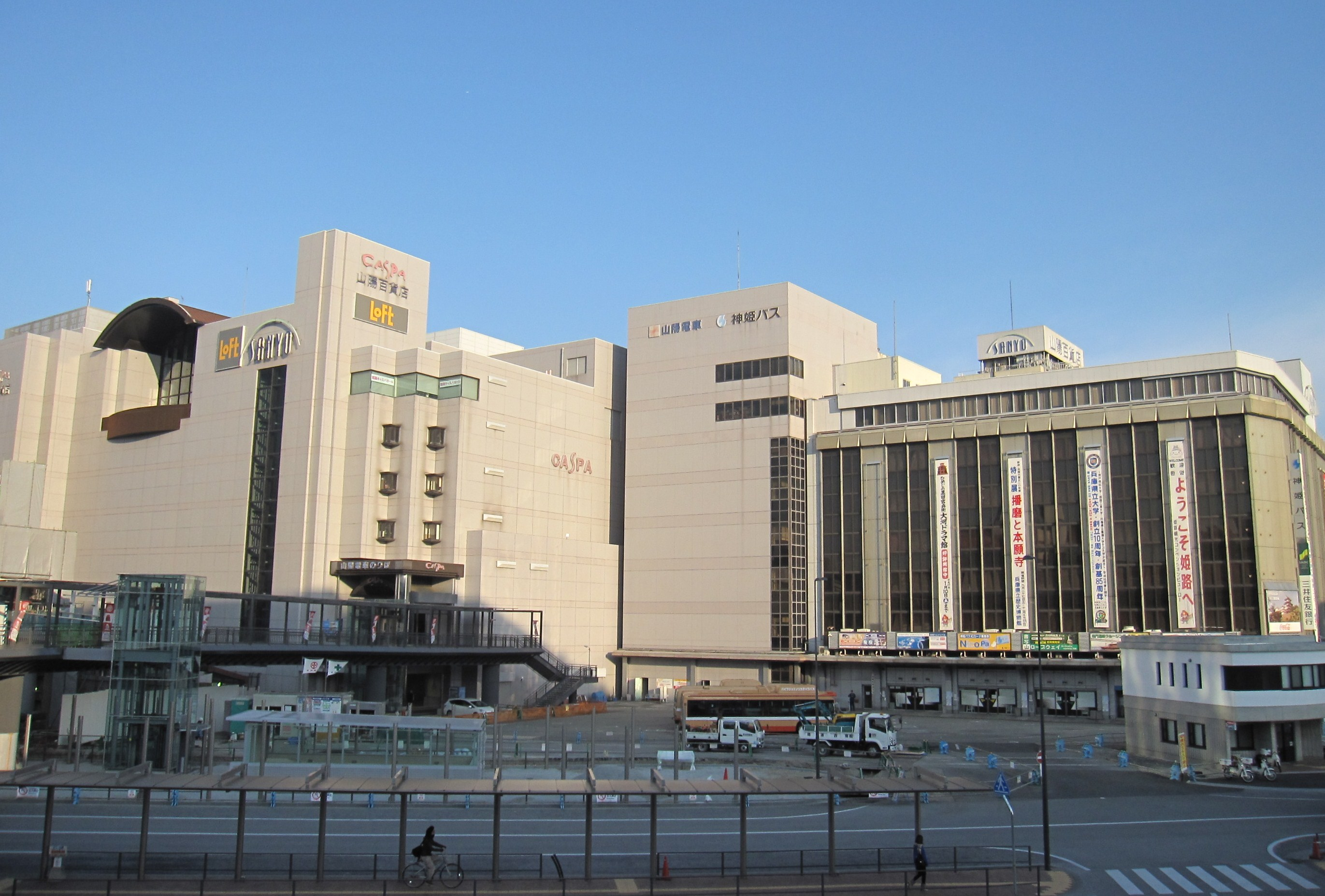
Company headquarters in Himeji.

=== Consolidated subsidiary ===
- Shinki Green Bus Co., Ltd.
- West Princess Co., Ltd.
- Shinki Zone Bus Co., Ltd.
- Shinki Sightseeing Bus Corporation
- Shinki Taxi Corporation
- Maiko God Princess Taxi Co., Ltd.
- Tachibana Shinki Taxi Corporation
- Shinki Taxi Himeji Co., Ltd.
- Elteo Corporation
- Shinki Industry Co., Ltd.
- Shinki Commerce and Industry Co.
- Shinki Create Co. Ltd. Shinki Environment Service Co., Ltd.
- Hope Corporation Shinki Angel Heart Co., Ltd.
- Shinki Food Service Co., Ltd.
- Shinki Travel Co., Ltd. (originally a subsidiary of Asahi Broadcasting "ABC · Travel", after the company bought it the name changed to "ABC Shinki Travel" by Shinki Bus capital participation, on April 1, 2016 the capital of the company remains even after becoming the current company name)
- Shinki Sightseeing Holdings Co., Ltd.
- Shinki Bus Tours Co., Ltd.
- Fujiya Kamaboko Co., Ltd.
- Shinki Delivering Co., Ltd.
- Swim Co., Ltd.

=== Equity-method affiliate ===
- Sanyo Department Store Co., Ltd.

=== Other affiliates ===
- Sanyo Electric Railway Co., Ltd.
- Hanshin Electric Railway Co., Ltd. - the largest shareholder. However, the Shinki bus does not belong to the Hankyu Hanshin Toho group .
- Bus Terminal Co., Ltd. - Temporary dispatch of executives and capital alliance. There was a report that management integration will be integrated in April 2009. President Uesugi of Shinki Bus to the press coverage expressed motivation, but since then both companies have not announced the official announcement. The company's Kobe Total All taxis came along with the dissolution, Amagasaki Sales Office in Amagasaki City was transferred by Tachibana Shinko taxi, which is operated in the city (Kobe head office is Kobe head office Kokusai Kogyo (now Kokusai Osaka → International Kobe Kobe) Transfer).
