= Hiyoshi Station (Kyoto) =

Railway station in Nantan, Kyoto Prefecture, Japan

Hiyoshi Station 日吉駅
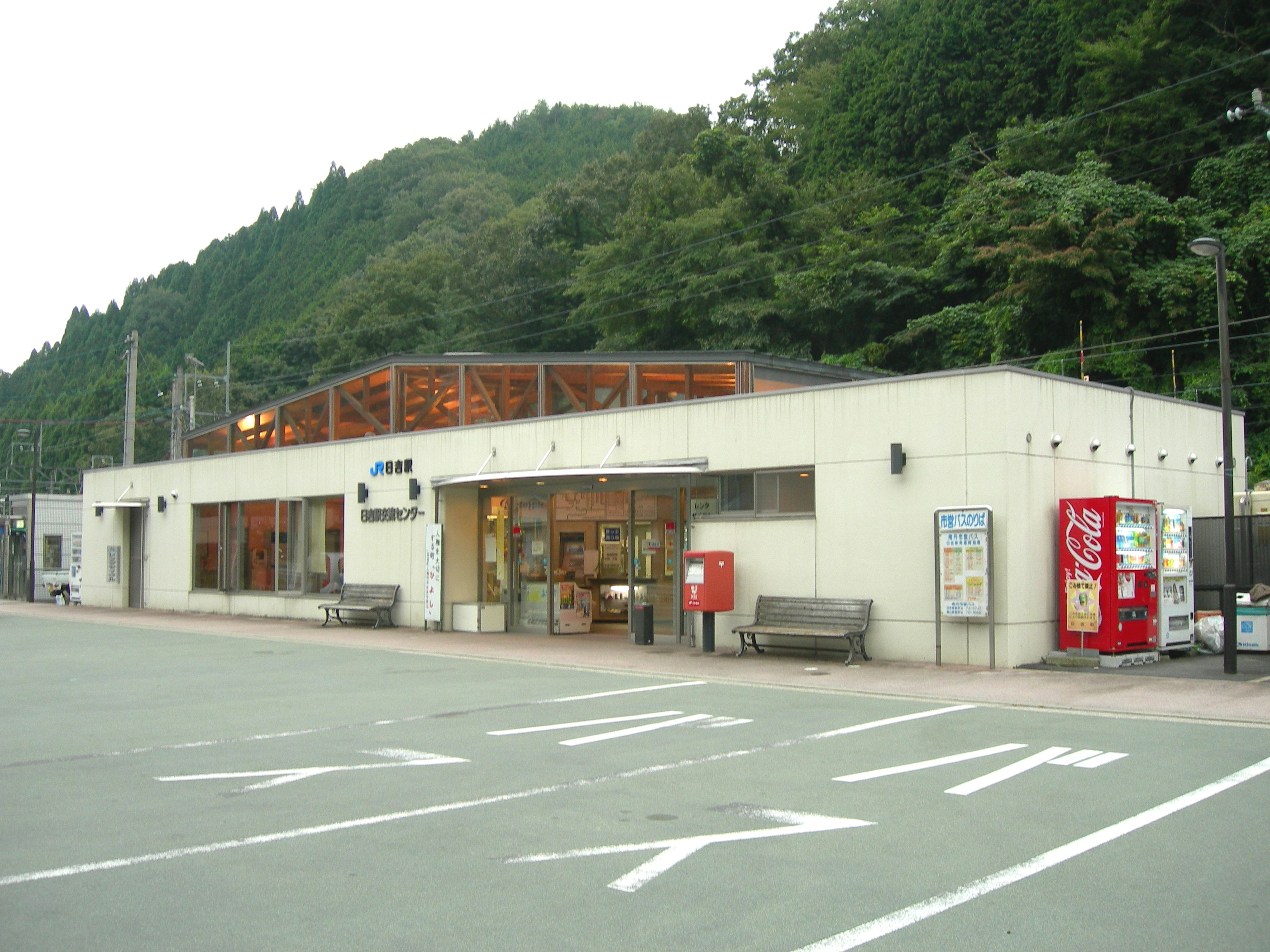
- Hiyoshi Station in August 2009

General information
- Location: 10-1 Ichino, Honoda, Hiyoshi-cho, Nantan-shi, Kyoto-fu 629-0301; Japan
- Coordinates: 35°09′46″N 135°30′12″E
- Owner: West Japan Railway Company
- Operator: West Japan Railway Company
- Line: San'in Main Line
- Distance: 41.9 km (26.0 miles) from Kyoto
- Platforms: 1 island platform
- Connections: Bus stop

Construction
- Structure type: Ground level

Other information
- Status: Staffed
- Website: Official website

History
- Opened: 25 August 1910
- Former names: Tonoda (until 1996)

Passengers
- FY 2023: 468 daily

Services
Preceding station	JR West	Following station
Shinkyū-Daigaku-mae towards Kinosaki-Onsen	San'in Line Local Rapid	Funaoka towards Kyoto
Ayabe towards Kinosaki Onsen	San'in Line Kinosaki Limited service	Sonobe towards Kyoto
Ayabe towards Higashi-Maizuru	San'in Line Maizuru Limited service	Sonobe towards Kyoto
Location
- Location within Kyoto Prefecture Location within Japan

Hiyoshi Station (日吉駅, Hiyoshi-eki) is a passenger railway station located in the city of Nantan, Kyoto Prefecture, Japan, operated by West Japan Railway Company (JR West).

== Lines ==
Hiyoshi Station is served by the San'in Main Line, and is located 41.9 kilometers from the terminus of the line at Kyoto.

== Station layout ==
The station consists of one ground-level island platform connected to the station building by a level crossing. The station is staffed.

=== Platforms ===
1	■ San'in Main Line	for Sonobe and Kyoto
2	■ San'in Main Line	for Ayabe and Fukuchiyama

== History ==
Hiyoshi Station opened on August 25, 1910, as Tonoda Station (殿田駅, Tonoda-eki) and was renamed Hiyoshi on March 16, 1996. With the privatization of the Japan National Railways (JNR) on April 1, 1987, the station came under the aegis of the West Japan Railway Company.

== Passenger statistics ==
In fiscal 2018, the station was used by an average of 538 passengers daily.

== Surrounding area ==
- Nantan City Hall Hiyoshi Branch
- Nantan Municipal Tonda Elementary School
- Nantan Municipal Tonda Junior High School

== See also ==
- List of railway stations in Japan
