= Namikawa Station =

Railway station in Kameoka, Kyoto Prefecture, Japan

Namikawa Station 並河駅
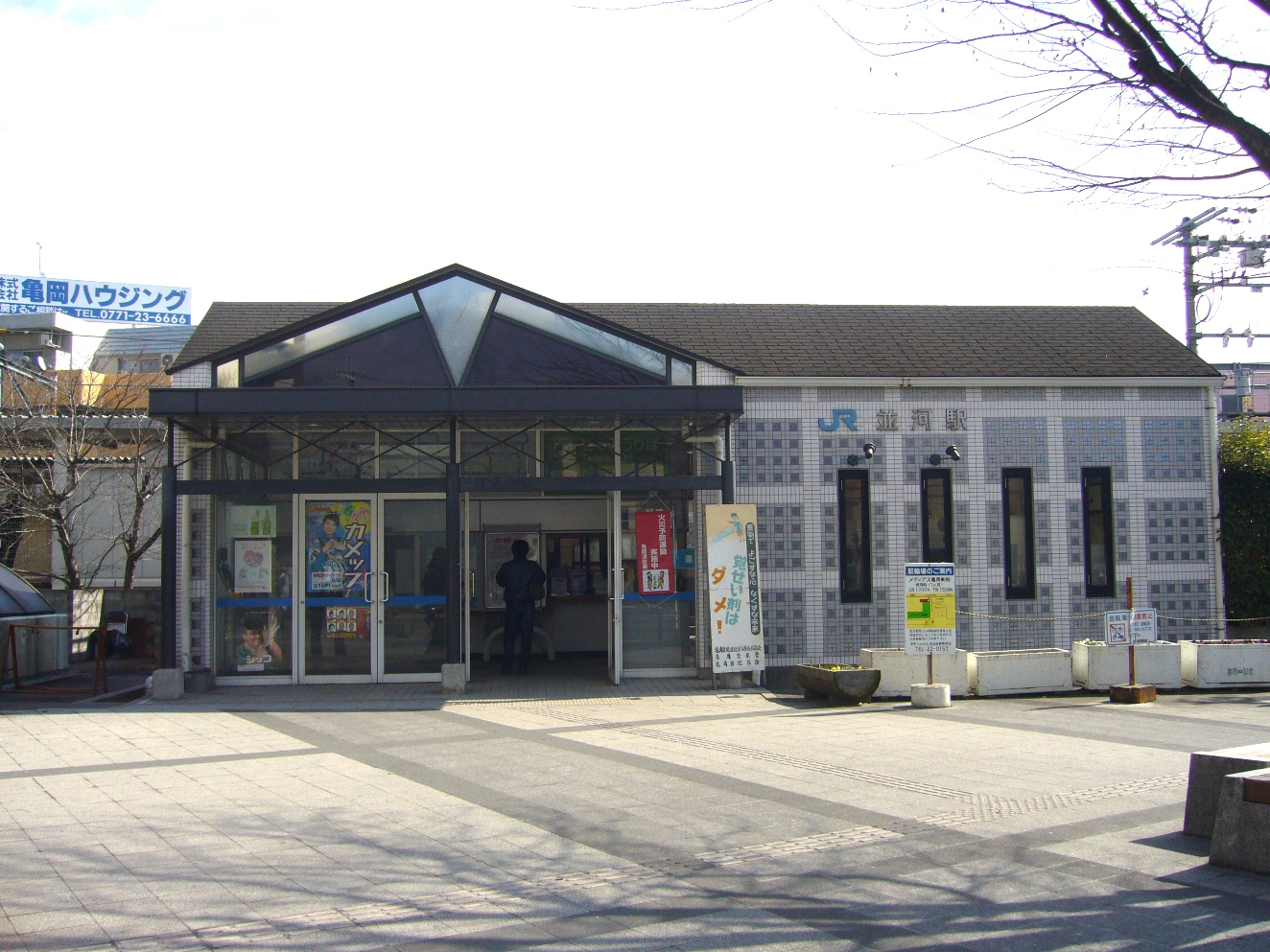
- Namikawa Station in 2008

General information
- Location: 2-11 Ōichō Tsuchida, Kameoka-shi, Kyoto-fu 621-0011; Japan
- Coordinates: 35.0325°N 135.5549°E
- Owner: West Japan Railway Company
- Operator: West Japan Railway Company
- Line: Sagano Line (San'in Main Line)
- Distance: 23.4 km (14.5 miles) from Kyoto
- Platforms: 2 side platforms
- Connections: Bus stop

Other information
- Status: Staffed
- Station code: JR-E12
- Website: Official website

History
- Opened: 20 July 1935

Passengers
- FY 2023: 5,634 daily

Services
Preceding station	JR West	Following station
Chiyokawa towards Sonobe	Sagano Line Local Rapid	Kameoka towards Kyoto
Location
- Location within Kyoto Prefecture Location within Japan

Namikawa Station (並河駅, Namikawa-eki) is a passenger railway station located in the city of Kameoka, Kyoto Prefecture, Japan, operated by West Japan Railway Company (JR West).

== Lines ==
Namikawa Station is served by the San'in Main Line (Sagano Line), and is located 23.4 kilometres (14.5 miles) from the terminus of the line at Kyoto.

== Station layout ==
The station consists of two opposed side platforms connected to the station building by a footbridge. The station has a Midori no Madoguchi staffed ticket office.

=== Platforms ===
1	■ San'in Main Line	for Kameoka and Kyoto
2	■ San'in Main Line	for Sonobe and Fukuchiyama

== History ==
Namikawa Station opened on 20 July 1935. With the privatization of the Japan National Railways (JNR) on 1 April 1987, the station came under the aegis of the West Japan Railway Company. The current station building in 1989 when the station was relocated 120 metres (390 feet) to the north of its original location.

Station numbering was introduced in March 2018 with Namikawa being assigned station number JR-E12.

== Passenger statistics ==
In fiscal 2019, the station was used by an average of 3257 passengers daily.

== Surrounding area ==
- Kameoka Municipal Taisei Junior High School
- Kameoka City Oi Elementary School

== See also ==
- List of railway stations in Japan
