= Chiyokawa Station =

Railway station in Kyoto Prefecture, Japan

Chiyokawa Station 千代川駅
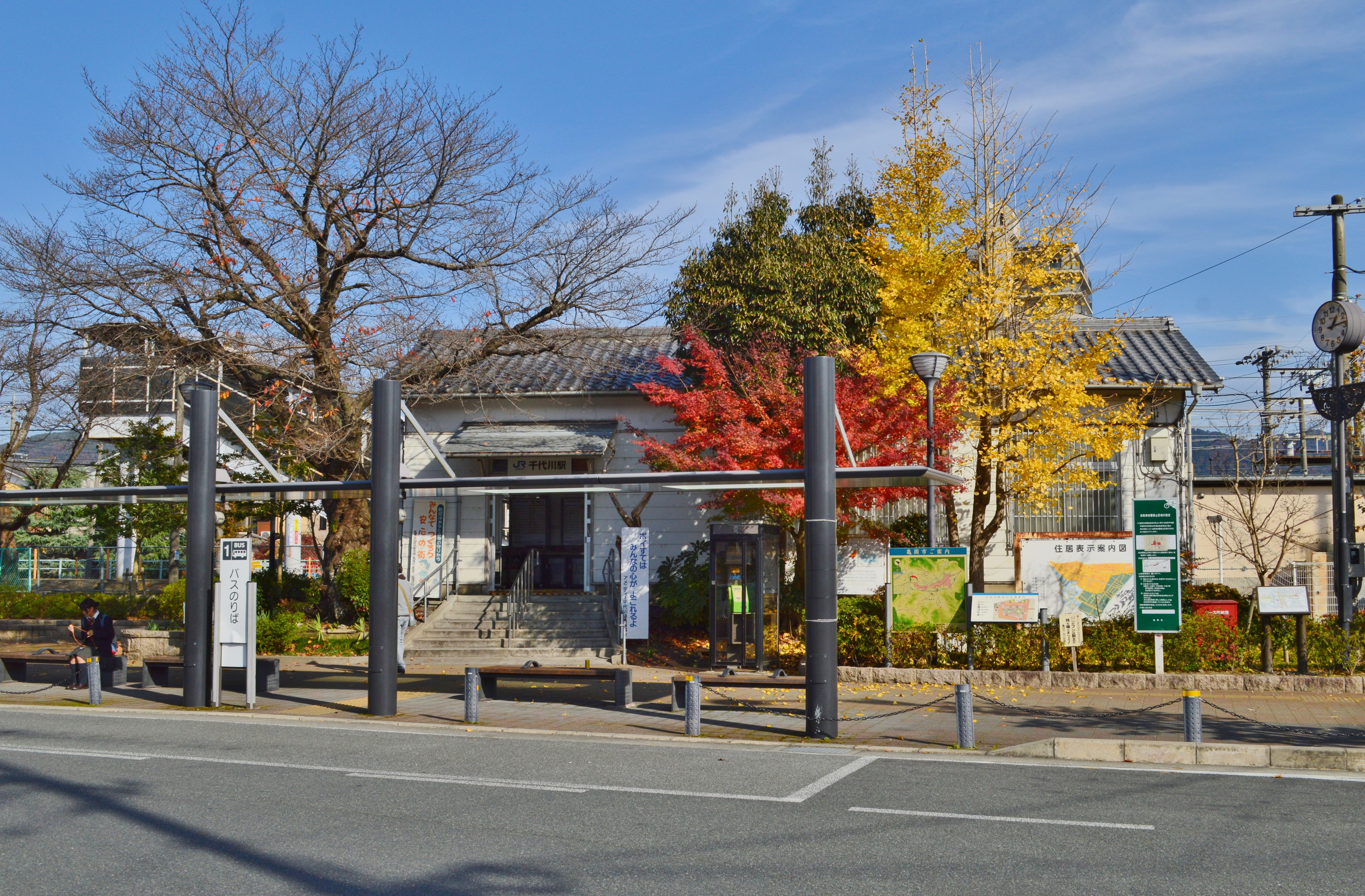
- Chiyokawa Station in 2016

General information
- Location: 1-12 Chiyokawachō Imazu, Kameoka-shi, Kyoto-fu 621-0051; Japan
- Coordinates: 35.0488°N 135.5482°E
- Owner: West Japan Railway Company
- Operator: West Japan Railway Company
- Line: Sagano Line (San'in Main Line)
- Distance: 25.2 km (15.7 miles) from Kyoto
- Platforms: 2 side platforms
- Tracks: 2
- Connections: Bus stop

Other information
- Status: Staffed
- Station code: JR-E13
- Website: Official website

History
- Opened: 20 July 1935

Passengers
- FY 2023: 4,150 daily

Services
Preceding station	JR West	Following station
Yagi towards Sonobe	Sagano Line Local Rapid	Namikawa towards Kyoto
Location
- Location within Kyoto Prefecture Location within Japan

Chiyokawa Station (千代川駅, Chiyokawa-eki) is a passenger railway station located in the city of Kameoka, Kyoto Prefecture, Japan, operated by West Japan Railway Company (JR West).

== Lines ==
Chiyokawa Station is served by the San'in Main Line (Sagano Line), and is located 25.2 kilometres (15.7 miles) from the terminus of the line at Kyoto.

== Station layout ==
The station consists of two opposed side platforms connected to the station building by a footbridge. The station is staffed.

=== Platforms ===
1	■ San'in Main Line	for Kameoka and Kyoto
2	■ San'in Main Line	for Sonobe and Fukuchiyama

== History ==
Chiyokawa Station opened on 20 July 1935. With the privatization of the Japan National Railways (JNR) on 1 April 1987, the station came under the aegis of the West Japan Railway Company.

Station numbering was introduced in March 2018 with Chiyokawa being assigned station number JR-E13.

The current station building was renovated in 2021 and opened for service in February of that year.

== Passenger statistics ==
In fiscal 2019, the station was used by an average of 2153 passengers daily.

== Surrounding area ==
- Tanba Kokubun-ji
- Izumo-daijingū
- Kameoka City Chiyokawa Elementary School,

== See also ==
- List of railway stations in Japan
