= Yagi Station =

Railway station in Nantan, Kyoto Prefecture, Japan

Yagi Station 八木駅
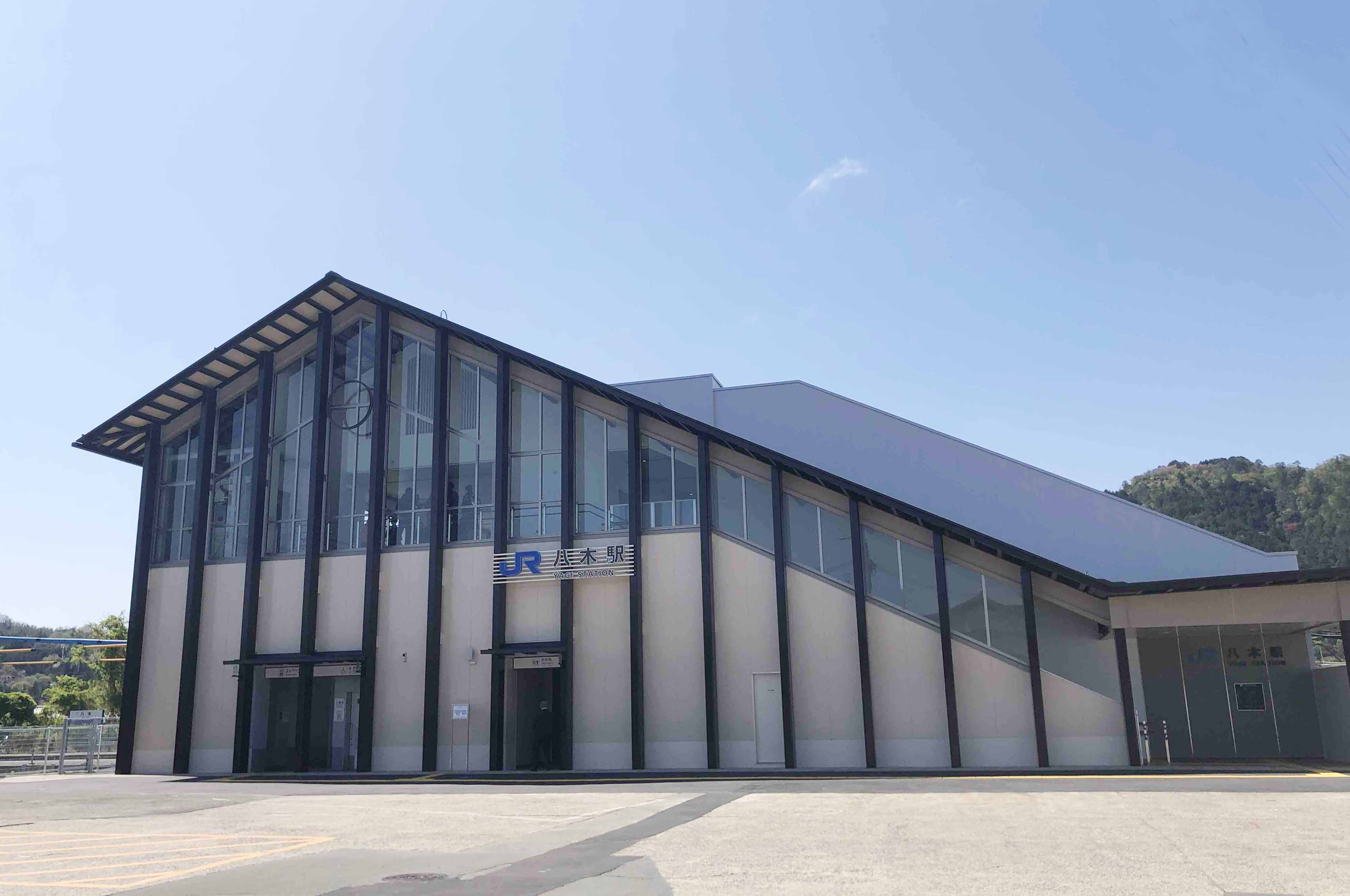
- Yagi Station in April 2021

General information
- Location: Yagi-Ueno 34-1, Yagi-cho, Nantan-shi, Kyoto-fu 629-0141; Japan
- Coordinates: 35.0691°N 135.5322°E
- Owner: West Japan Railway Company
- Operator: West Japan Railway Company
- Line: Sagano Line (San'in Main Line)
- Distance: 28.2 km (17.5 miles) from Kyoto
- Platforms: 2 side platforms
- Tracks: 2
- Connections: Bus stop

Construction
- Structure type: Ground level
- Accessible: Yes

Other information
- Status: Staffed
- Station code: JR-E14
- Website: Official website

History
- Opened: 15 August 1899

Passengers
- FY 2023: 2,606 daily

Services
| Preceding station | JR West | Following station |
|---|---|---|
| Yoshitomi towards Sonobe | Sagano Line Local Rapid | Chiyokawa towards Kyoto |
Location
- Location within Kyoto Prefecture Location within Japan

Yagi Station (八木駅, Yagi-eki) is a passenger railway station located in the city of Nantan, Kyoto Prefecture, Japan, operated by West Japan Railway Company (JR West).

== Lines ==
Yagi Station is served by the San'in Main Line (Sagano Line), and is located 28.2 kilometres (17.5 miles) from the terminus of the line at Kyoto.

== Station layout ==
The station consists of two opposed side platforms connected to the station building by a footbridge. The station is staffed.

=== Platforms ===
| 1 | ■ San'in Main Line | for Kameoka and Kyoto |
| 2 | ■ San'in Main Line | for Sonobe and Fukuchiyama |

== History ==
Yagi Station opened on 15 August 1899. With the privatization of the Japan National Railways (JNR) on 1 April 1987, the station came under the aegis of the West Japan Railway Company.

Station numbering was introduced in March 2018 with Yagi being assigned station number JR-E14.

The current station building was completed in April 2021 along with barrier-free improvements.

== Passenger statistics ==
In the 2018 fiscal year, the station was used by an average of 1440 passengers daily.

== Surrounding area ==
- Nantan City Office Yagi Branch (former: Yagi Town Office)
- Japan National Route 9
- Kyoto Chubu Medical Center

== See also ==
- List of railway stations in Japan
