= Sonobe Station =

Railway station in Nantan, Kyoto Prefecture, Japan

Sonobe Station 園部駅
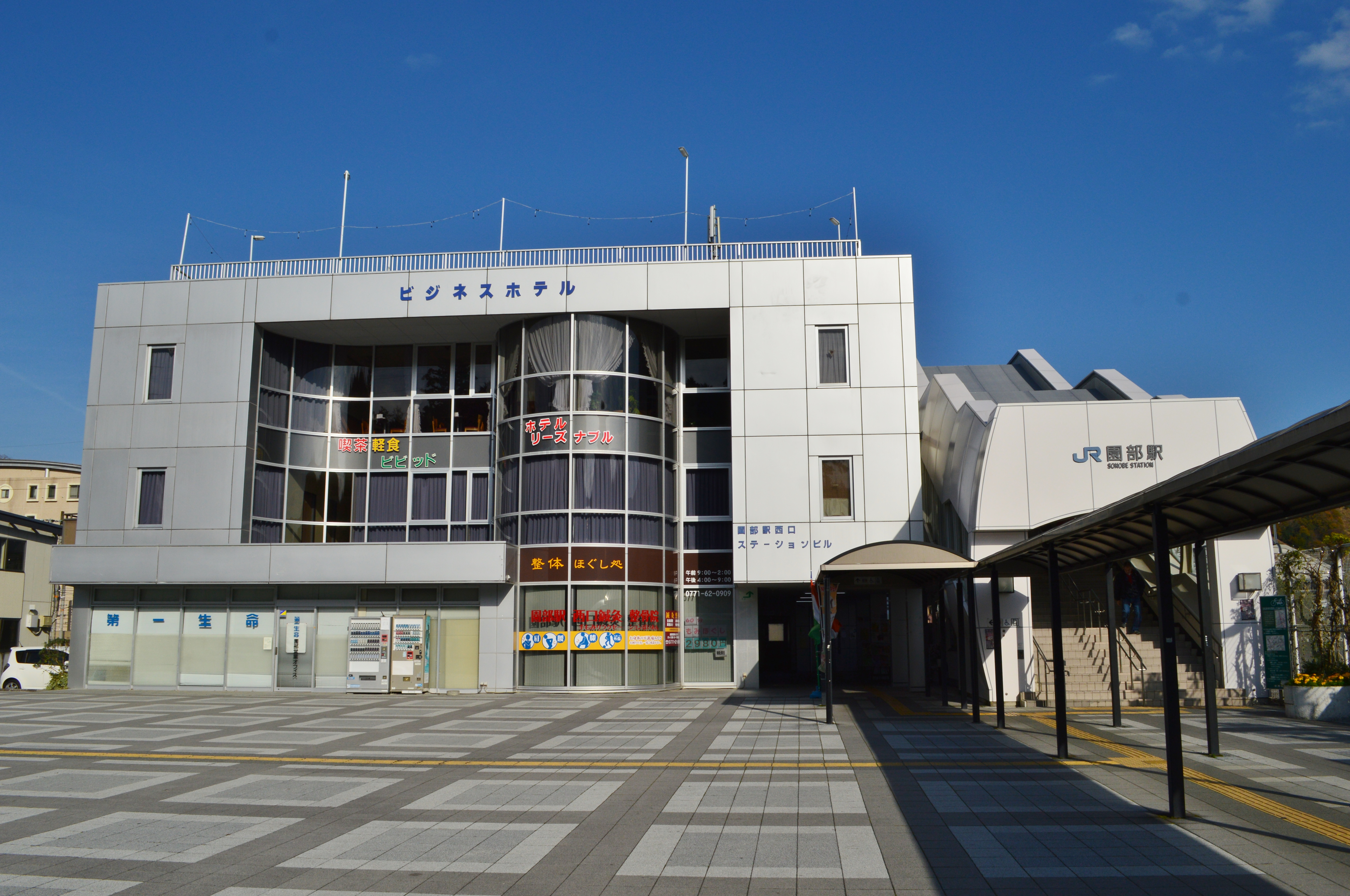
- Sonobe Station West entrance, 2016

General information
- Location: Mizobe, Oyama Higashimachi, Sonobe Town, Nantan City; Kyoto Prefecture 622-0041; Japan
- Coordinates: 35°6′9.21″N 135°28′59.38″E
- Operator: JR West
- Lines: E San'in Main Line; E Sagano Line
- Distance: 34.2 km (21.3 miles) from Kyōto
- Platforms: 2 island platforms
- Tracks: 4
- Connections: Bus stop

Construction
- Structure type: At grade

Other information
- Status: Staffed (Midori no Madoguchi)
- Station code: JR-E16
- Website: Official website

History
- Opened: 15 August 1899; 127 years ago

Passengers
- FY 2023: 8,538 daily

Services
Preceding station	JR West	Following station
Funaoka towards Kinosaki-Onsen	San'in Line	through to Sagano Line
through to San'in Main Line	Sagano Line	Yoshitomi towards Kyoto
Location
- Location within Kyoto Prefecture Location within Kansai region Location within Japan

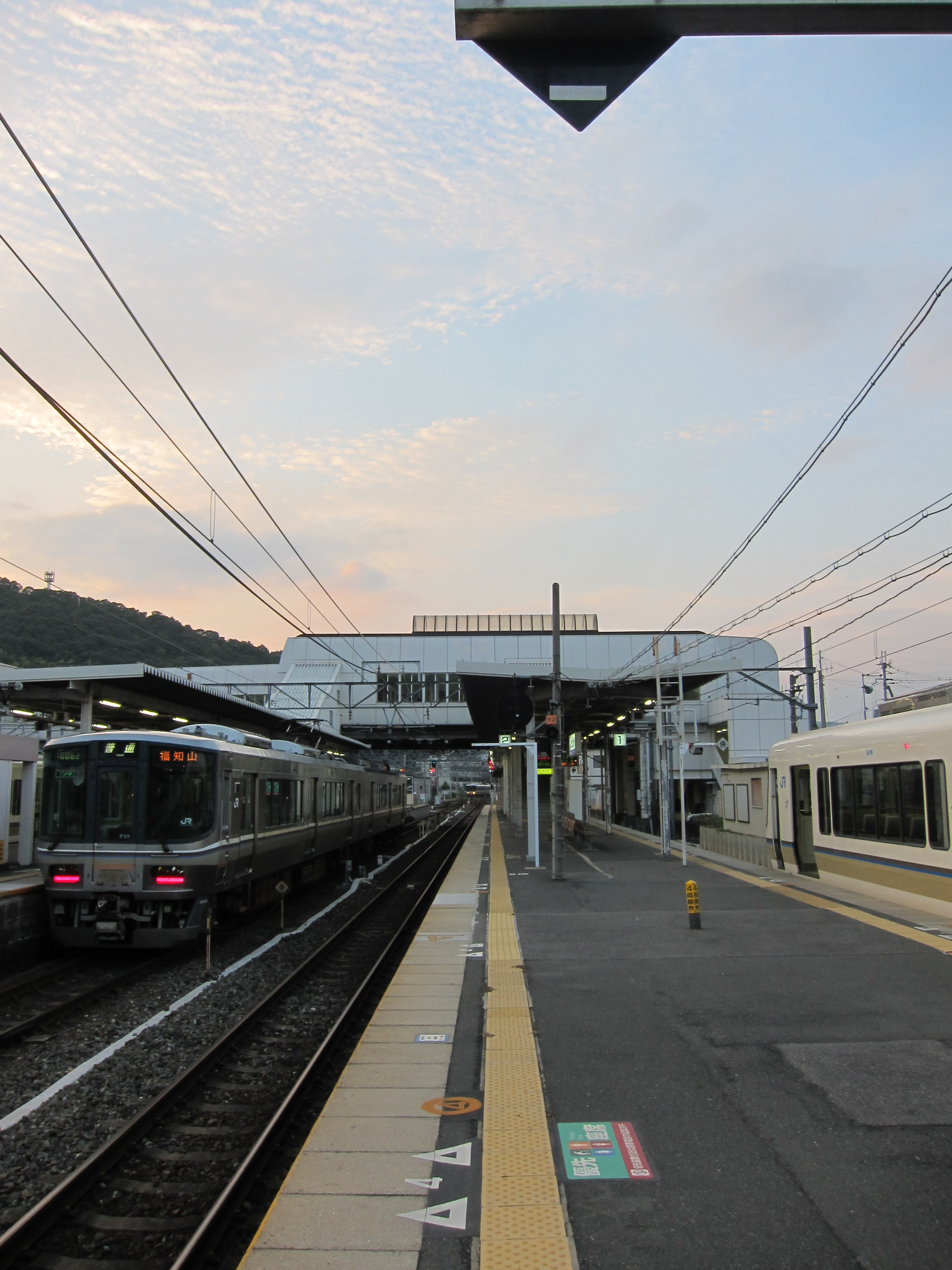
Sonobe Station platforms, October 2010

Sonobe Station (園部駅, Sonobe-eki) is a passenger railway station located in the city of Nantan, Kyoto Prefecture, Japan, operated by West Japan Railway Company (JR West). Kinosaki, Hashidate, and Maizuru limited express trains all stop at this station.

== Lines ==
Sonobe Station is served by the San'in Main Line (called the Sagano Line between this station and Kyōto Station), and is located 34.2 kilometers from the terminus of the line at Kyōto.

== Station layout ==
The station consists of two ground-level island platforms connected by an elevated station building. The station has a Midori no Madoguchi staffed ticket office.

=== Platforms ===
1, 2, 3, 4	■ Sagano Line	for Kameoka, Nijo and Kyōto
1, 2, 3, 4	■ Sanin Line	for Ayabe, Fukuchiyama and Maizuru

== Adjacent stations ==
«	Service	»
West Japan Rail Company Sanin Main Line (Kyoto - Sonobe: Sagano Line)
Yoshitomi	Local	Funaoka
Yoshitomi (rapid service)	Rapid Service (Sagano Line)	Funaoka (local)
Yoshitomi (local)	Rapid Service (Sonobe—Fukuchiyama)	Funaoka (rapid service)
Kameoka	Limited Express Kinosaki, Maizuru, Hashidate	Ayabe; Hiyoshi (Kinosaki 2, 4, 15; Maizuru 2, 11)

== Bus routes ==
Route buses
Operator	Via	Destination	Route	Note
West JR Bus	Kyotanba Town Hall	Fukuchiyama Station	Empuku Line	Passengers with a valid Japan Rail Pass can ride this route for free
Keihan Kyoto Kotsu	Yoshitomi Station, Chiyokawa Station, Yagi Station, Yoshitomi Station	Kameoka Station	Kokudo Line [3]	
Keihan Kyoto Kotsu	Yunohana Onsen	Kameoka Station	Hachida Line [40]	
Keihan Kyoto Kotsu	Settsu Tenno	Fukusumi	Enjo Line [44]	
Keihan Kyoto Kotsu	Funasaka	Nogei High School	Sonobe Engei Line [47]	
Keihan Kyoto Kotsu	Hiyoshi Station (Kyoto)	Meiji University of Integrative Medicine	Meiji University of Integrative Medicine Line [45]	
Keihan Kyoto Kotsu		Sonobe Ohashi	Meiji University of Integrative Medicine Line [45]	
Keihan Kyoto Kotsu	Yoshitomi Station	Nantan Hospital	Sonobe Yagi Line [46]	
Nantan Village Bus	Hiyoshi Station (Kyoto)	Izumi	Miyama Sonobe Line	Runs on weekdays and Saturdays

== History ==
Sonobe Station opened on August 15, 1899. With the privatization of the Japan National Railways (JNR) on April 1, 1987, the station came under the aegis of the West Japan Railway Company. The current station building was completed in 1991.

== Passenger statistics ==
In fiscal 2018, the station was used by an average of 4514 passengers daily (boarding passengers only).

== Surrounding area ==
- Kyoto College of Medical Science (formerly Kyoto College of Medical Science)
- Kyoto Arts and Crafts University (KYOBI)
- Kyoto School of Architecture (KASD)
- Kyoto Traditional Crafts College (TASK)

== See also ==
- List of railway stations in Japan
