= Funaoka Station =

Funaoka Station is the name of multiple train stations in Japan.

- Funaoka Station (Kyoto) in Kyoto Prefecture
- Funaoka Station (Miyagi) in Miyagi Prefecture
