= 287 series =

Japanese electric multiple unit train type

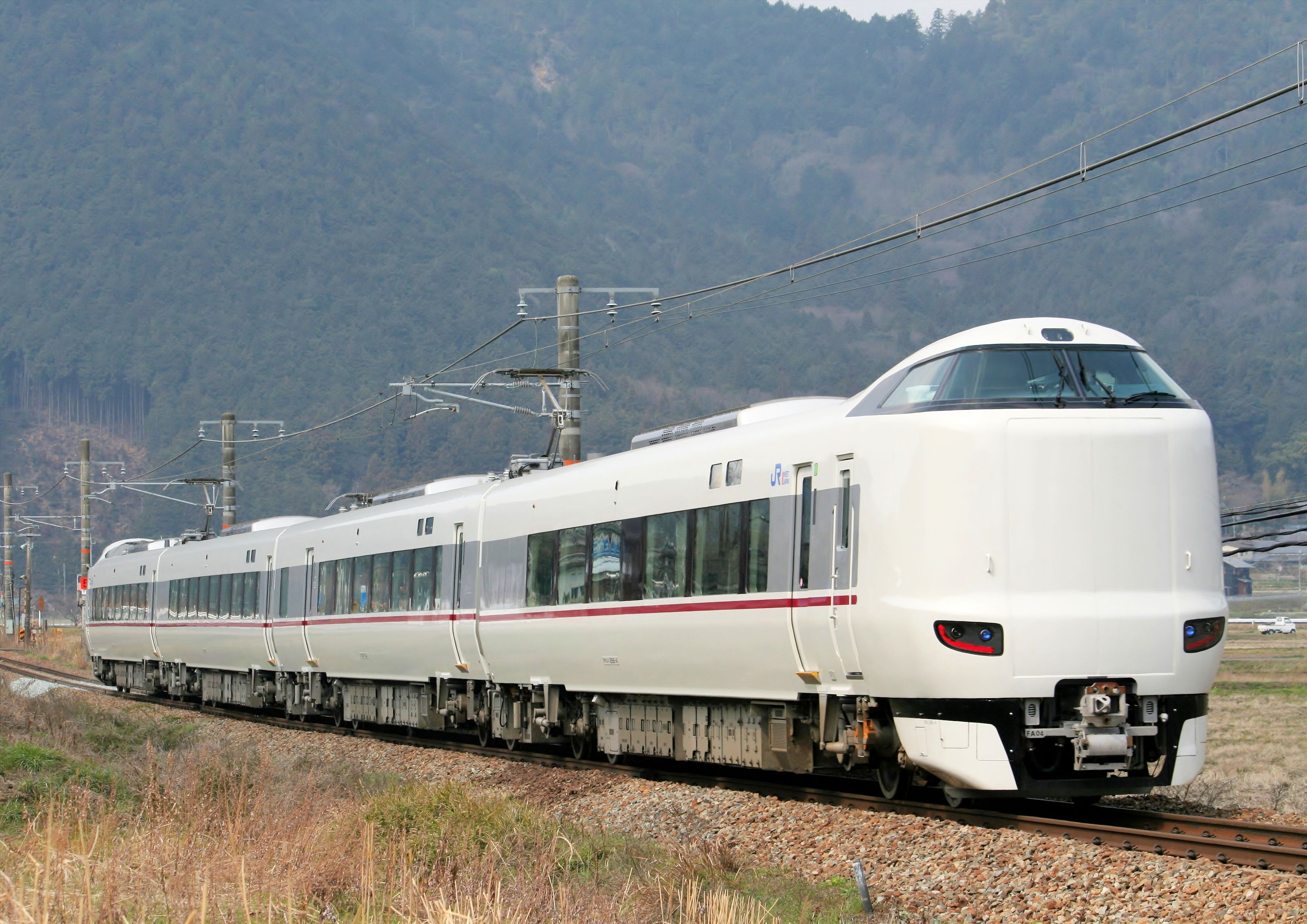
- 4-car set FA04 on a Kounotori service, March 2011
- Manufacturers: Kawasaki Heavy Industries, Kinki Sharyo
- Replaced: 183 series, 381 series
- Constructed: 2010–2012
- Entered service: 12 March 2011
- Number built: 97 vehicles (24 sets)
- Formation: 3/4/6 cars per trainset
- Fleet numbers: FA01 – FA07, FC01 – FC06, HC601 – HC606, HC631 – HC635
- Operator: JR West
- Depots: Fukuchiyama, Hineno
- Lines served: Tōkaidō Main Line; Sanin Main Line; Fukuchiyama Line; Hanwa Line; Kisei Main Line; Osaka Higashi Line; Kyoto Tango Railway Miyafuku Line; Kyoto Tango Railway Miyazu Line

Specifications
- Car body construction: Aluminium, double-skin
- Car length: 21,100 mm (69 ft 3 in)
- Width: 2,915 mm (9 ft 6.8 in)
- Height: 3,490 mm (11 ft 5 in)
- Floor height: 1,125 mm (3 ft 8.3 in)
- Doors: One per side
- Maximum speed: 130 km/h (80 mph)
- Traction system: Variable frequency Toshiba IGBT-VVVF (2-level IGBT)
- Traction motors: WMT106A-G1
- Power output: 270 kW (360 hp) × 2 per motored car
- Acceleration: 1.6 km/(h⋅s) (1.0 mph/s)
- Deceleration: 4.6 km/(h⋅s) (2.9 mph/s) (service); 5.2 km/(h⋅s) (3.2 mph/s) (emergency)
- Electric system: 1,500 V DC overhead catenary
- Current collection: WPS28C single-arm pantograph
- Bogies: WDT67 (motored); WTR249, WTR249A (trailer)
- Braking systems: Regenerative brake, electronically controlled pneumatic brakes, snow-resistant brake
- Safety system: ATS-SW2, ATS-P3
- Track gauge: 1,067 mm (3 ft 6 in)

The 287 series (287系, 287-kei) is a DC electric multiple unit (EMU) train type operated by West Japan Railway Company (JR-West) in Japan on limited express services such as the Kinosaki and Kounotori from Kyoto and Osaka since 12 March 2011. 287 series EMUs were introduced on Kuroshio services from the start of the revised timetable on 17 March 2012.

A total of 97 vehicles were built. These consist of 46 vehicles for Kinosaki, Kounotori, Maizuru, and Hashidate services, formed as seven 4-car sets and six 3-car sets, which will partially replace the ageing fleet of 86 183 series vehicles currently used on these services. A further batch of 51 vehicles for Kuroshio services consists of six 6-car sets and five 3-car sets, replacing older 381 series EMUs. These entered service from the start of the revised timetable on 17 March 2012.

== Design ==
The trains are based on the earlier 683 series Thunderbird design with increased front-end crash protection and the inclusion of crushable zones for the first time on JR-West limited express rolling stock. Livery is similar to that used on 683 series Thunderbird sets, with a maroon stripe below the dark grey window band for the Kinosaki and Kōnotori trains, and "ocean green" for the Kuroshio trains.

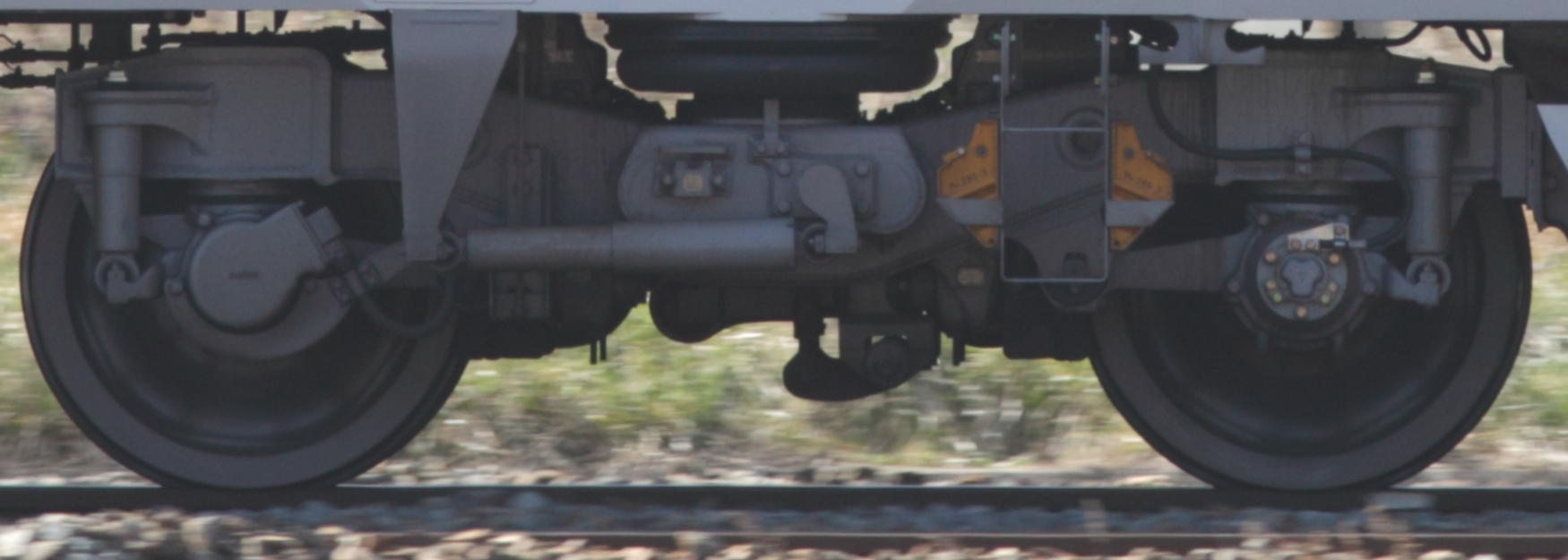
WT249 trailer bogie on car KuMoHa 286‑3

== Formations ==
The various formations are configured as follows.

=== 4-car Kinosaki/Kounotori/Hashidate sets ===
Sets FA01–07, based at Fukuchiyama Depot

Car No.	1	2	3	4
Designation	M'sc	M1	M'	Mc
Numbering	KuMoRoHa 286	MoHa 287-100	MoHa 286	KuMoHa 287
Capacity	38 (15 Grn + 23 std)	50	68	64
Weight (t)	41.9	40.7	38.6	40.5

The KuMoHa 287 and MoHa 287 cars are each fitted with two WPS28C single-arm pantographs. However, only one on each car is normally raised in regular service, with the second pantograph serving as a de-icing pantograph.

=== 3-car Kinosaki/Kounotori/Maizuru/Hashidate sets ===
Sets FC01–06, based at Fukuchiyama Depot

Car No.	5	6	7
Designation	M'c	M'1	Mc
Numbering	KuMoHa 286	MoHa 286-100	KuMoHa 287
Capacity	56	58	64
Weight (t)	41.4	39.0	40.5

The KuMoHa 287 car is fitted with two WPS28C single-arm pantographs. However, only one is normally raised in regular service, with the second pantograph serving as a de-icing pantograph.

=== 6-car Kuroshio/Mahoroba sets ===
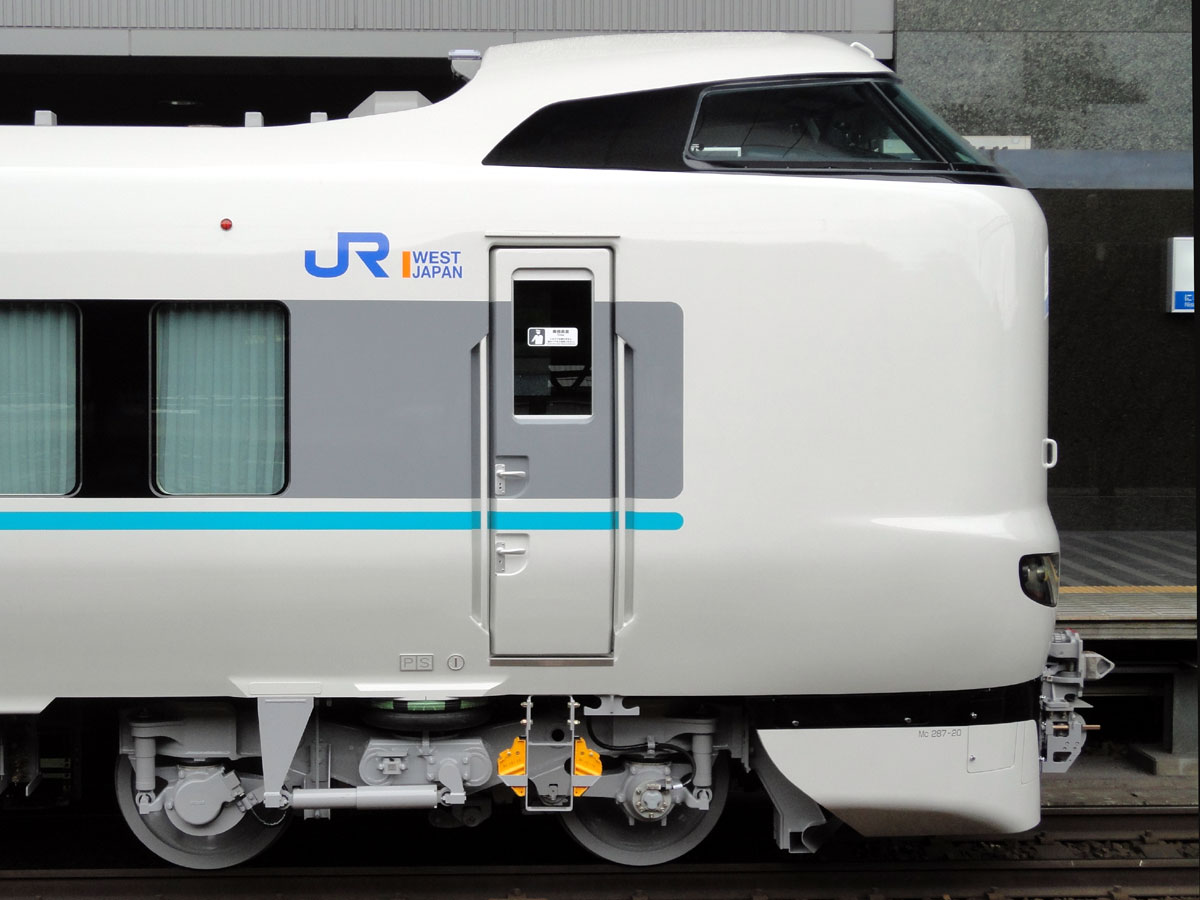
A side view of car KuMoHa 287-20 of six-car set HC605 in April 2012

Sets HC601–606, based at Hineno Depot

Car No.	1	2	3	4	5	6
Designation	M'sc	M'	M2	M'2	M'	Mc
Numbering	KuMoRoHa 286	MoHa 286	MoHa 287-200	MoHa 286-200	MoHa 286	KuMoHa 287
Capacity	38 (15 Grn + 23 std)	68	72	50	68	64
Weight (t)	41.9	38.6	37.9	39.8	38.6	40.0

The KuMoHa 287 and MoHa 287 cars are each fitted with one WPS28C single-arm pantograph.

=== 3-car Kuroshio/Mahoroba/Rakuraku Yamato sets ===
Sets HC631–635, based at Hineno Depot

Car No.	7	8	9
Designation	M'c	M'1	Mc
Numbering	KuMoHa 286	MoHa 286-100	KuMoHa 287
Capacity	56	58	64
Weight (t)	41.4	39.0	40.5

The KuMoHa 287 car is fitted with one WPS28C single-arm pantograph.

== Interior ==
Internally, Green car (first class) accommodation is in 2+1 abreast configuration, and standard class is 2+2. All Green car seats have AC power outlets, and standard-class saloons have AC power outlets at either end of each car. The trains include universal access toilets and also women-only toilets.

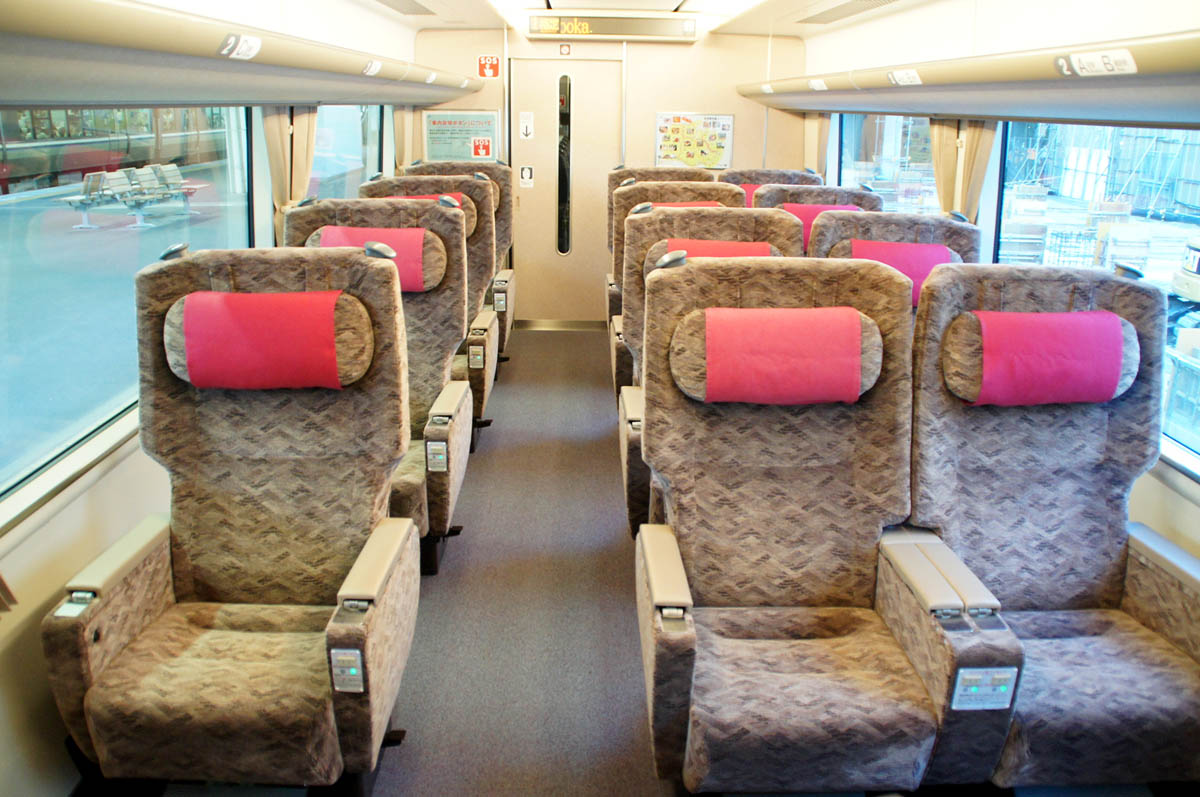
Green car saloon, August 2011

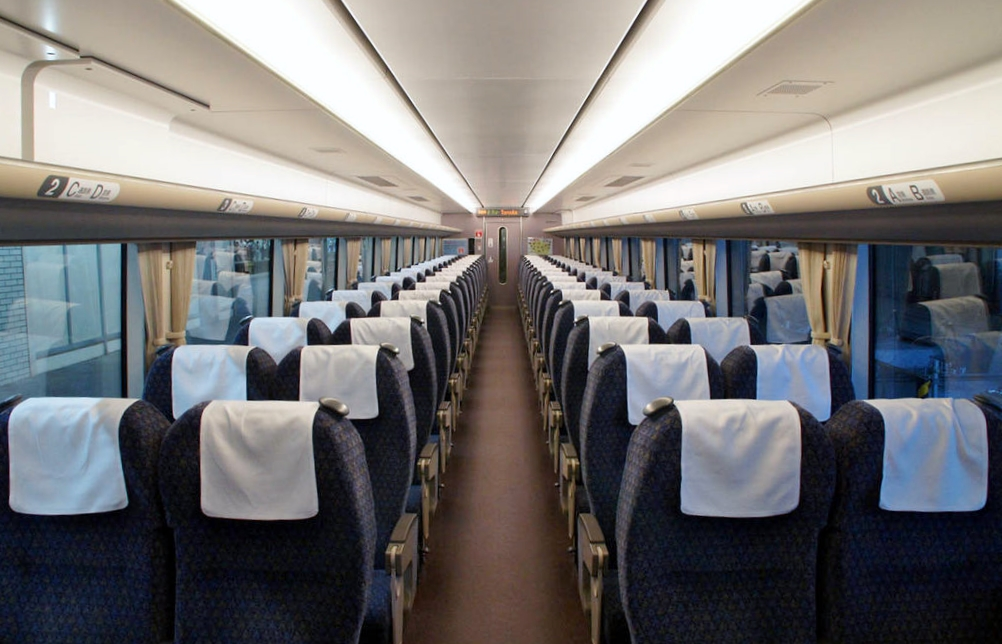
Standard-class saloon, August 2011

== History ==
The first 3- and 4-car sets destined for Kinosaki and Kounotori services were unveiled to the media at Kinki Sharyo's factory in Higashiōsaka, Osaka, on 26 November 2010, and delivered to JR-West on 29 November.

The first 6-car set destined for Kuroshio services was unveiled to the media at Kinki Sharyo's factory on 4 August 2011. Test running commenced from 29 September 2011. The first set manufactured by Kawasaki Heavy Industries in Hyogo Prefecture, a 6-car Kuroshio set, was delivered in February 2012.

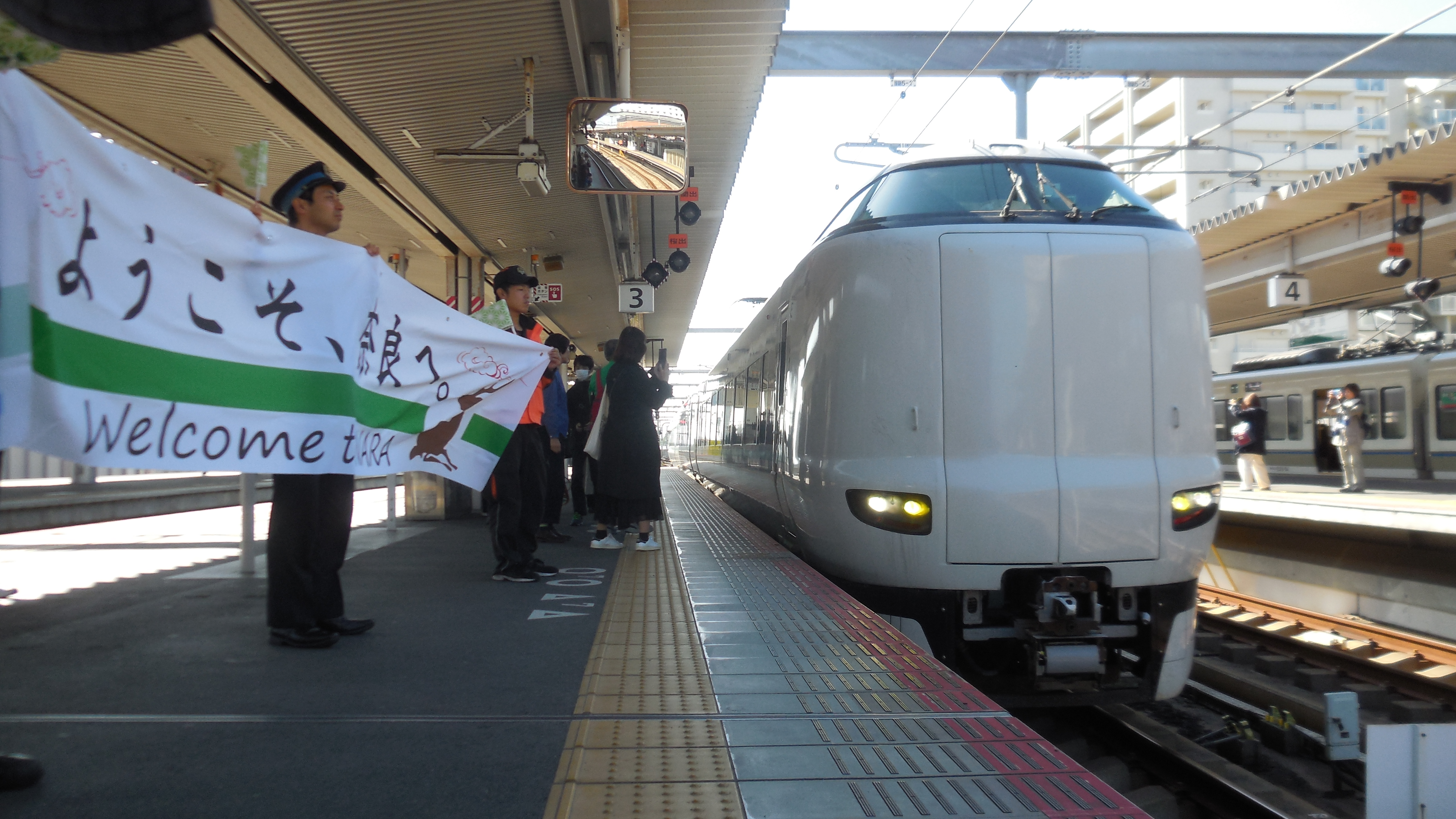
287 series on the first Mahoroba service, November 2019

In August 2019, JR-West announced that Hineno-based 287 series 3-car sets would be introduced on irregular Mahoroba limited express services between Shin-Osaka and Nara stations. The first round of these trips occurred between 2 November and 8 December 2019, with a second round having been set to occur between 21 March and June 2020. A third round of trips commenced on 25 March 2023, and was set to cease on 23 April of that year, before a fourth round is scheduled to occur between 27 May and 11 June 2023.

On 15 December 2023, JR-West announced that the Rakuraku Yamato commuter limited express service that runs only on Weekdays between Shin-Osaka and Nara stations, would be introduced, starting from the March 2024 timetable revision. On 30 January 2024, JR West announced that 287 series 3-car sets would be used on these services.
