= Yoshitomi Station (Kyoto) =

Railway station in Nantan, Kyoto Prefecture, Japan

Yoshitomi Station 吉富駅
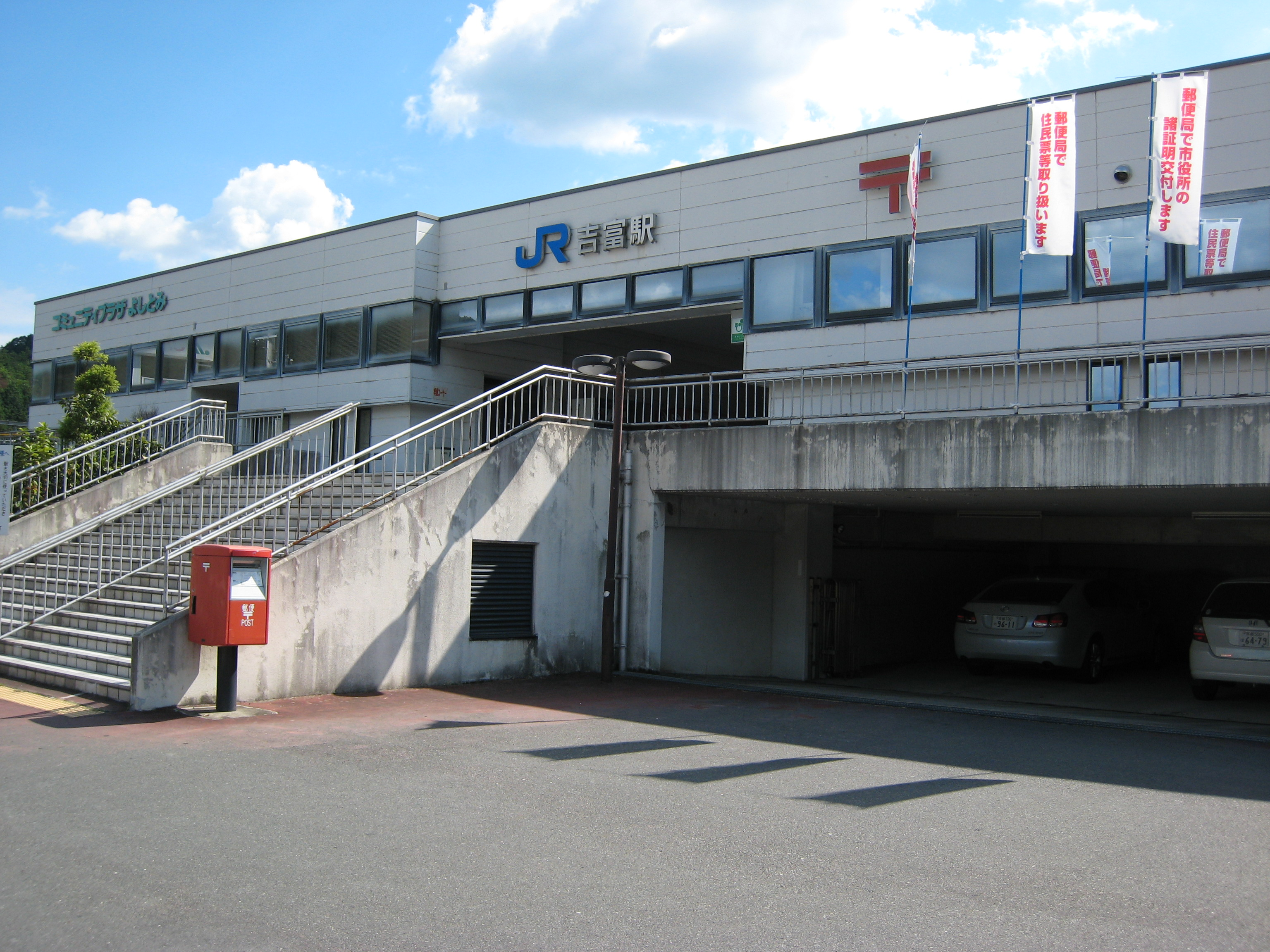
- Yoshitomi Station in August 2009

General information
- Location: 16 Kiwara Hijikatsubo, Yagi-cho, Nantan-shi, Kyoto-fu 629-0165; Japan
- Coordinates: 35°05′32″N 135°29′55″E
- Owner: West Japan Railway Company
- Operator: West Japan Railway Company
- Line: Sagano Line (San'in Main Line)
- Distance: 32.3 km (20.1 miles) from Kyoto
- Platforms: 2 side platforms
- Connections: Bus stop

Construction
- Structure type: Ground level

Other information
- Status: Unstaffed
- Station code: JR-E15
- Website: Official website

History
- Opened: 20 July 1935

Passengers
- FY 2023: 890 daily

Services
Preceding station	JR West	Following station
Sonobe Terminus	Sagano Line Local Rapid	Yagi towards Kyoto
Location
- Location within Kyoto Prefecture Location within Japan

Yoshitomi Station (吉富駅, Yoshitomi-eki) is a passenger railway station located in the city of Nantan, Kyoto Prefecture, Japan, operated by West Japan Railway Company (JR West).

== Lines ==
Yoshitomi Station is served by the San'in Main Line (Sagano Line), and is located 32.3 kilometres (20.1 miles) from the terminus of the line at Kyoto.

== Station layout ==
The station consists of two opposed side platforms connected by a footbridge. The station is unattended.

=== Platforms ===
1	■ San'in Main Line	for Kameoka and Kyoto
2	■ San'in Main Line	for Sonobe and Fukuchiyama

== History ==
Yoshitomi Station opened on 20 July 1935. With the privatization of the Japan National Railways (JNR) on 1 April 1987, the station came under the aegis of the West Japan Railway Company.

Station numbering was introduced in March 2018 with Yoshitomi being assigned station number JR-E15.

== Passenger statistics ==
In fiscal 2018, the station was used by an average of 500 passengers daily.

== Surrounding area ==
- Japan National Route 9

== See also ==
- List of railway stations in Japan
