= Maizuru (train) =

Japanese limited express train service

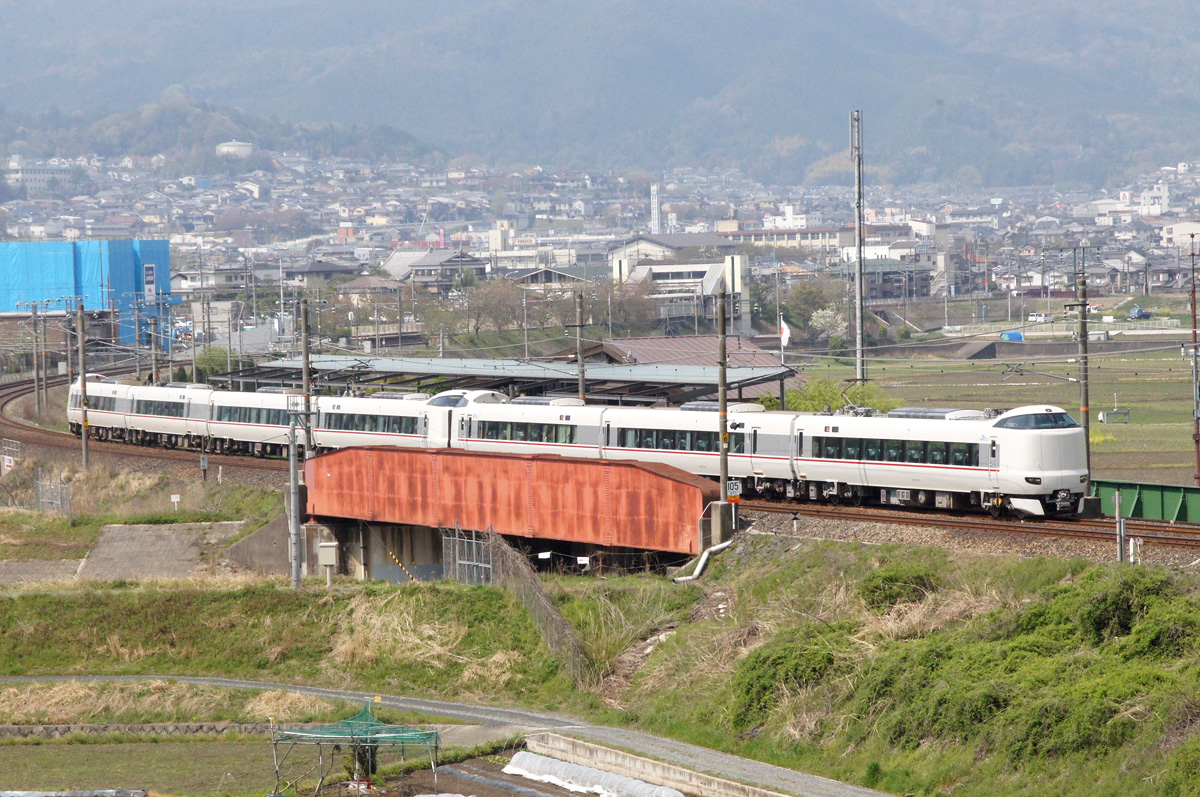
- 287 series EMU on a Kinosaki (4 cars) and Maizuru (3 cars) service, April 2011

Overview
- Service type: Limited express
- First service: 1999
- Current operator: JR West

Route
- Lines used: Sanin Main Line, Maizuru Line

Technical
- Rolling stock: 287 series EMU, Kitakinki Tango Railway KTR8000 series DMU
- Operating speed: 120 km/h (75 mph)

The Maizuru (まいづる) is a limited express train service operated by West Japan Railway Company (JR West) in Japan. It operates between Kyoto and Higashi-Maizuru via the Sanin Main Line, and is one of the services that make up JR West's "Kitakinki Big X Network" in northern Kansai.

== Station stops ==
Kyoto - Nijō - Kameoka - Sonobe - (Hiyoshi) - Ayabe - Nishi-Maizuru - Higashi-Maizuru

The Maizuru 2 and 11 (coupling with the Kinosaki services between Kyoto and Ayabe) stop at Hiyoshi Station.

== Rolling stock ==
Since the 12 March 2011 timetable revision, Maizuru services have been operated with 3-car 287 series electric multiple unit trains or 2-car Kitakinki Tango Railway KTR8000 series diesel multiple units, which operate coupled with Kinosaki or Hashidate sets between Kyoto and Ayabe. Green (first class) car accommodation is not available on Maizuru services.

Prior to 12 March 2011, services were operated using 3-car 183 series EMUs trains based at Fukuchiyama Depot. Trains operated coupled with 4-car Tamba sets between Kyoto and Ayabe.

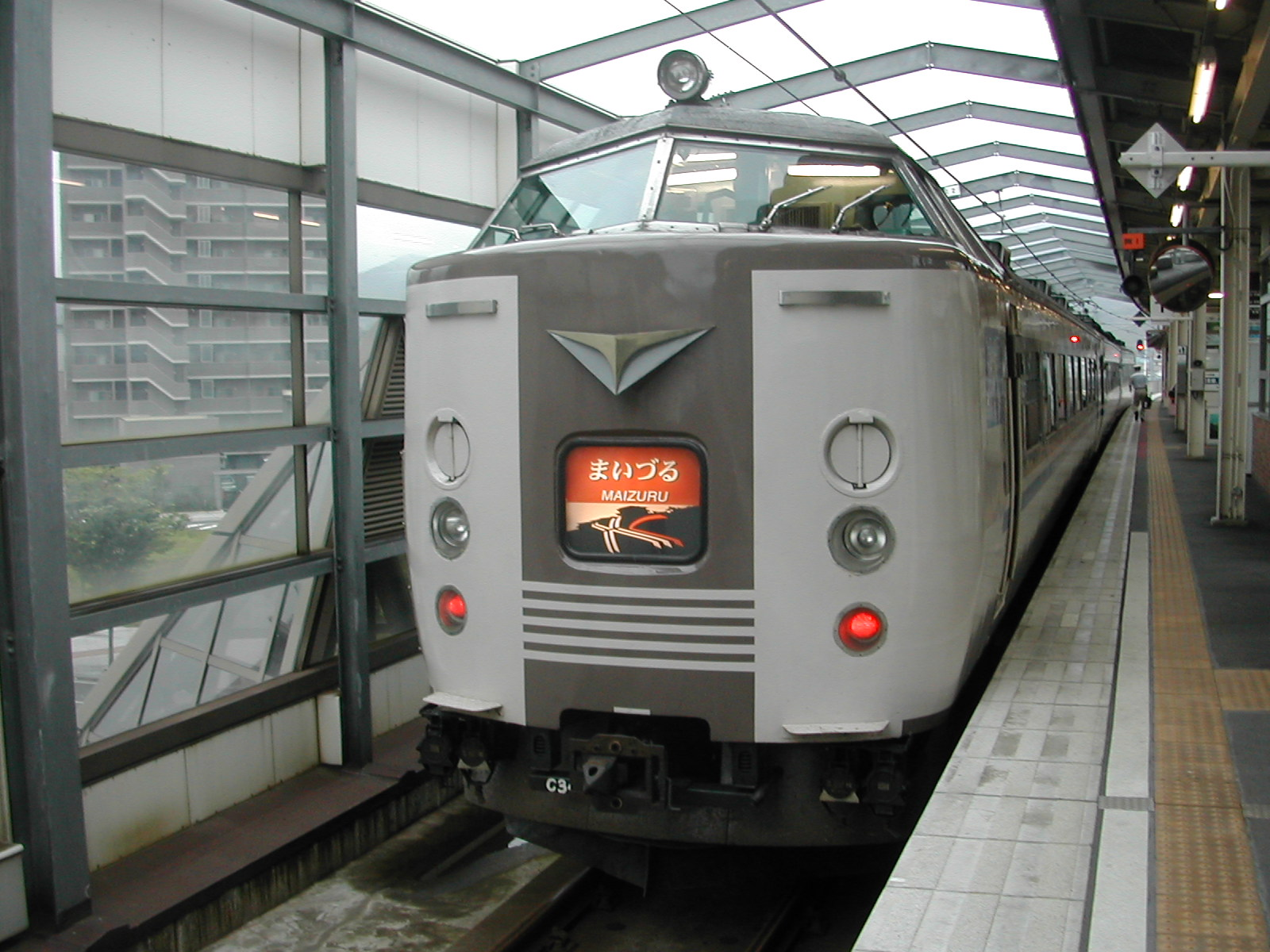
183 series EMU, July 2005

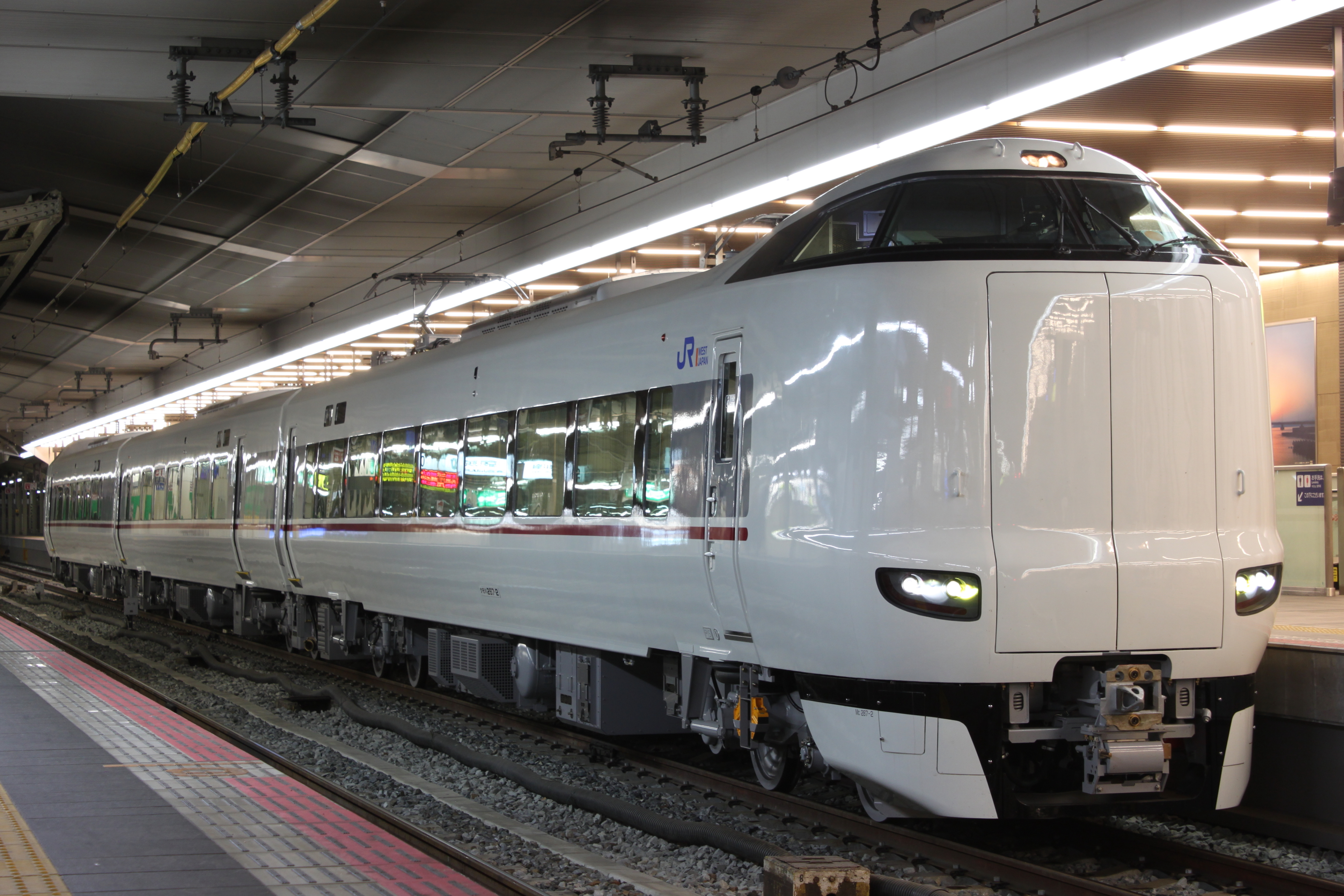
287 series EMU, January 2011

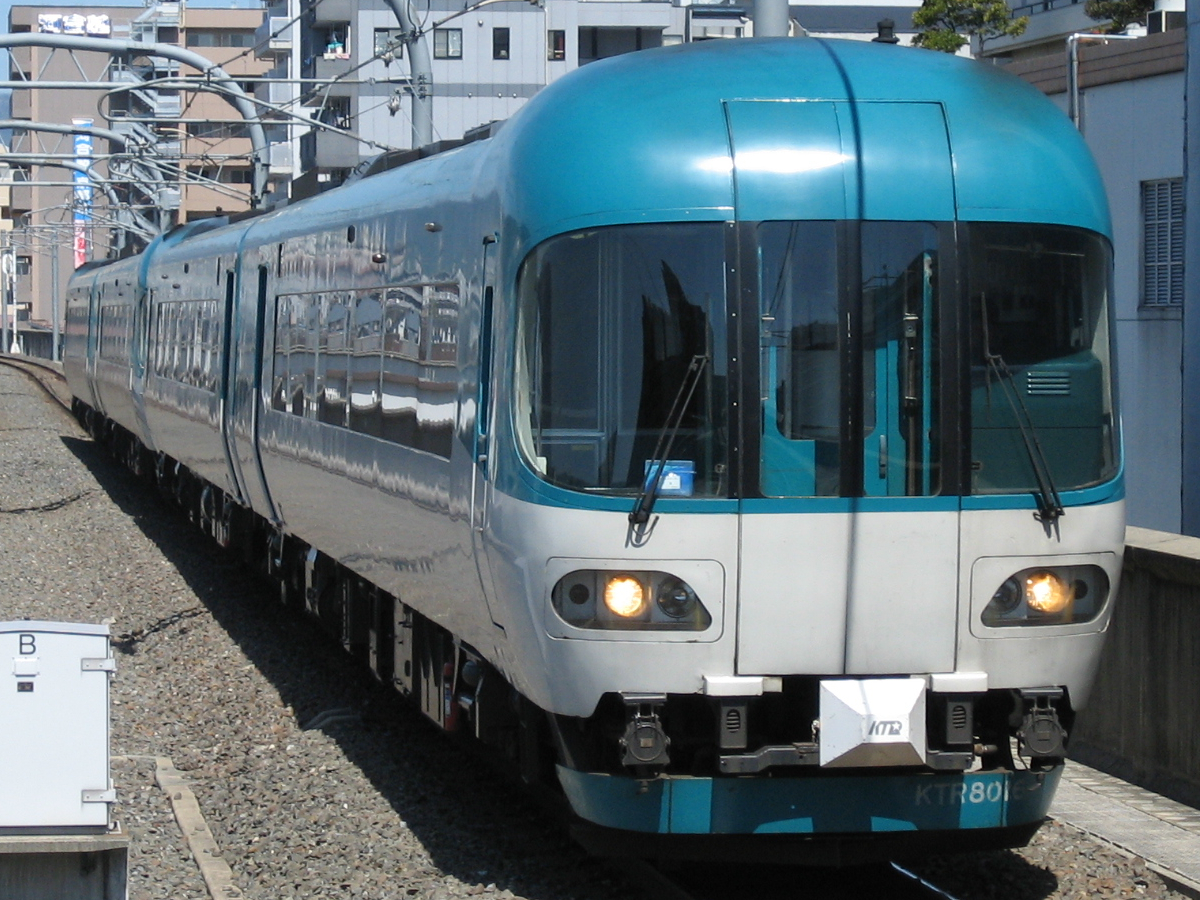
KTR8000 series DMU, March 2006

== History ==
The Maizuru service was introduced from 2 October 1999, following the completion of electrification of the Maizuru Line.

From 18 March 2007, all cars were made non-smoking.

== See also ==
- List of named passenger trains of Japan
