= Funaoka Station (Kyoto) =

Railway station in Nantan, Kyoto Prefecture, Japan

Funaoka Station 船岡駅
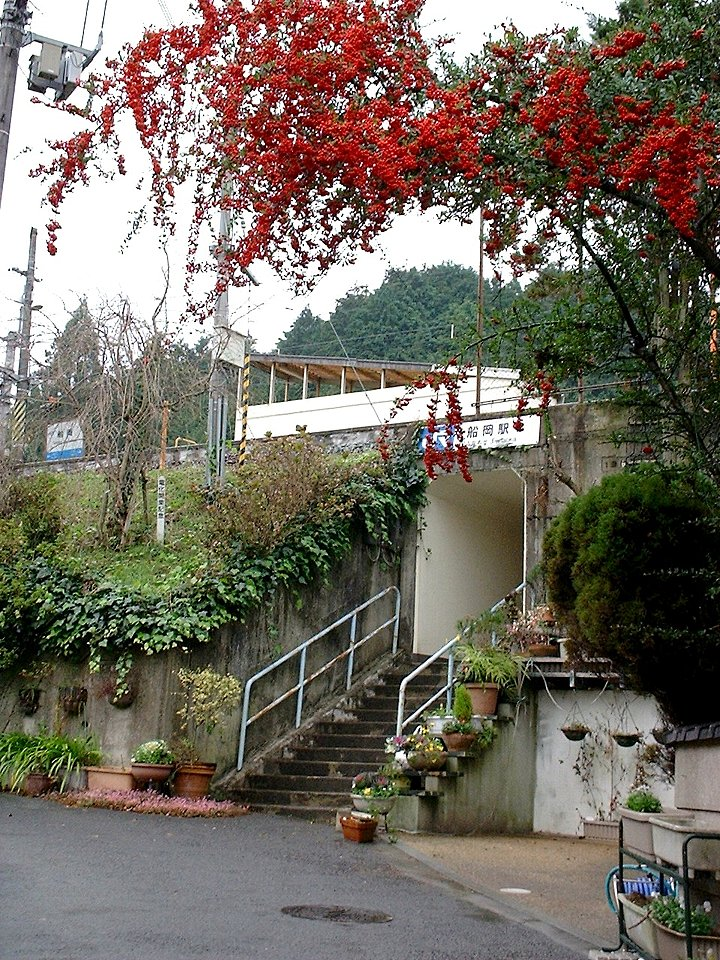
- Funaoka Station, July 2006

General information
- Location: Sonobecho Funaoka, Nantan-shi, Kyoto-fu 622-0031; Japan
- Coordinates: 35°08′00″N 135°29′31″E
- Owner: JR West
- Operator: JR West
- Line: San'in Main Line
- Distance: 38.2 km (23.7 miles) from Kyoto
- Platforms: 1 island platform
- Connections: Bus stop

Other information
- Status: Unstaffed
- Website: Official website

History
- Opened: 10 October 1953

Passengers
- FY 2023: 82 daily

Services
Preceding station	JR West	Following station
Hiyoshi towards Kinosaki-Onsen	San'in Line Local Rapid	Sonobe towards Kyoto
Location
- Location within Kyoto Prefecture Location within Japan

Funaoka Station (船岡駅, Funaoka-eki) is a passenger railway station located in the city of Nantan, Kyoto Prefecture, Japan, operated by West Japan Railway Company (JR West).

== Lines ==
Funaoka Station is served by the San'in Main Line, and is located 38.2 kilometers from the terminus of the line at Kyoto.

== Station layout ==
The station consists of one island platform on an embankment. There is no station building and the station is unattended.

=== Platforms ===
1	■ San'in Main Line	for Sonobe and Kyoto
2	■ San'in Main Line	for Ayabe and Fukuchiyama

== History ==
Funaoka Station opened on 10 October 1953. With the privatization of the Japan National Railways (JNR) on April 1, 1987, the station came under the aegis of the West Japan Railway Company.

== Passenger statistics ==
In fiscal 2018, the station was used by an average of 82 passengers daily.

== Surrounding area ==
- Nantan Municipal Kawabe Elementary School

== See also ==
- List of railway stations in Japan
