= Yoshitomi Station =

Yoshitomi Station (吉富駅) is the name of two train stations in Japan:

- Yoshitomi Station (Fukuoka)
- Yoshitomi Station (Kyoto)
