= Rakuraku Yamato =

Japanese commuter limited express service

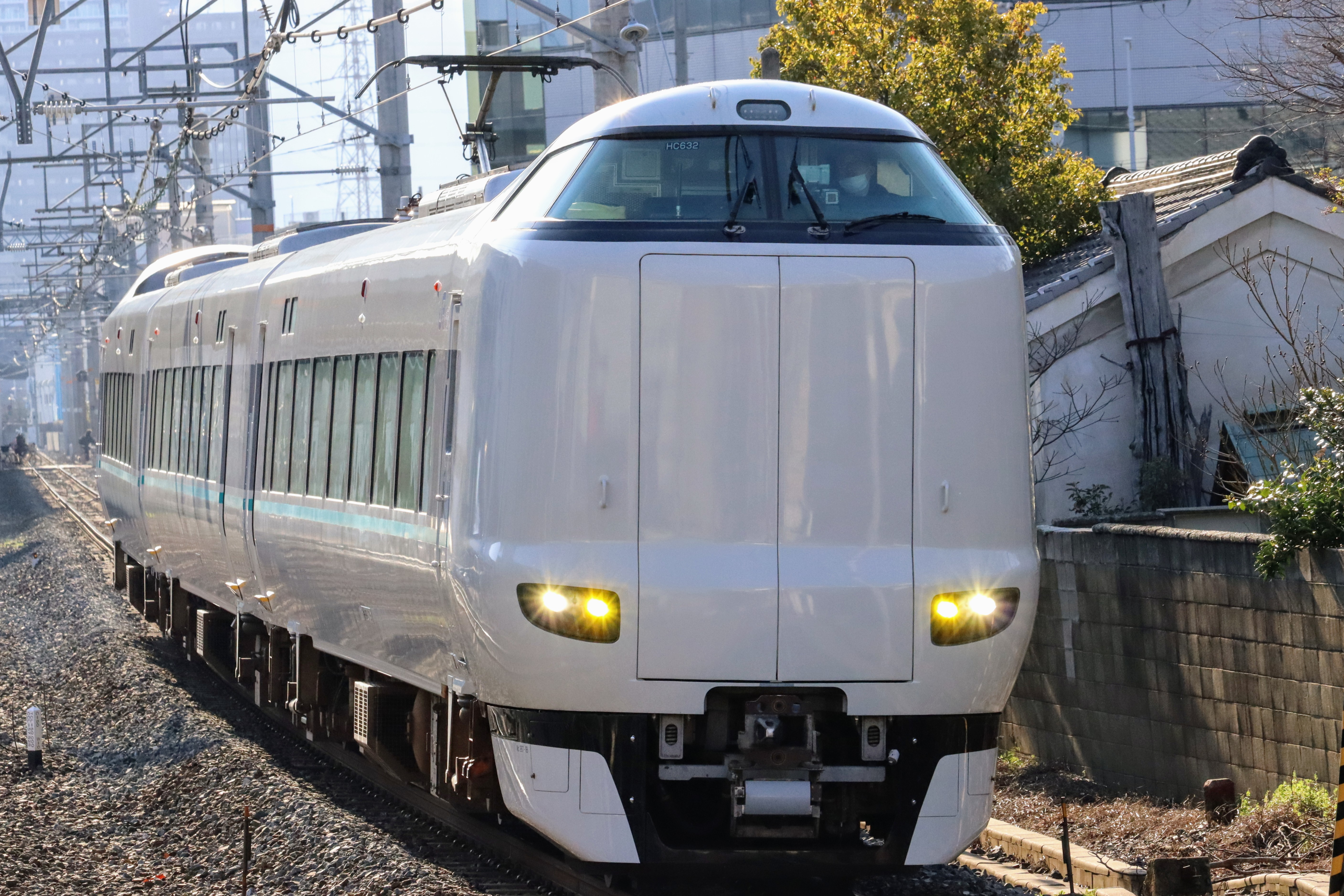
- Rakuraku Yamato's rolling stock, the 287 series

Overview
- Service type: Commuter Limited Express
- Status: Operational
- Locale: Osaka Prefecture, Nara Prefecture
- First service: 18 March 2024
- Current operator(s): JR West

Route
- Termini: Shin-Osaka; Nara
- Stops: 9
- Service frequency: 1 return working daily
- Line(s) used: Yamatoji Line, Osaka Loop Line

On-board services
- Class(es): Standard

Technical
- Rolling stock: 287 series EMUs
- Track gauge: 1,067 mm (3 ft 6 in)
- Electrification: 1,500 V DC overhead

The Rakuraku Yamato (らくラクやまと, Rakuraku Yamato) is a Commuter Limited Express train operated by West Japan Railway Company (JR West) between Shin-Osaka and Nara via the Yamatoji and Osaka Loop lines. This service started operation on 18 March 2024 as a weekday rush hour service as part of the March 2024 timetable revision to improve passenger comfort on the Yamatoji Line.

== History ==
- 15 December 2023 - Service officially announced by JR West that it will start operation in March 2024, along with stations served and operation frequency
- 30 January 2024 - Rolling stock for this service announced to be the 287 series
- 18 March 2024 - Start of operation with departure ceremony at Nara Station

== Service pattern ==
At the time of its introduction, the Rakuraku Yamato service only operates on Weekdays. One westbound service from Nara to Shin-Osaka is operated during morning rush hours and one eastbound service from Shin-Osaka to Nara is operated during evening rush hours.

Rakuraku Yamato trains serve the following stations:

Shin-Osaka - Osaka - Tennōji - Kyūhōji - Ōji - Hōryūji - Yamato-Koizumi - Koriyama - Nara

== Formations ==
Trains are operated using 3-car 287 series sets. All cars provide reserved standard class seating accommodation and are non-smoking.

Car No.	1	2	3
Accommodation	Reserved	Reserved	Reserved
Facilities		Wheelchair space	

== See also ==
- Mahoroba (train) - A special limited-express train that also runs through the Nara Prefecture
