= Ayabe Station =

Railway station in Ayabe, Kyoto Prefecture, Japan

Ayabe Station 綾部駅
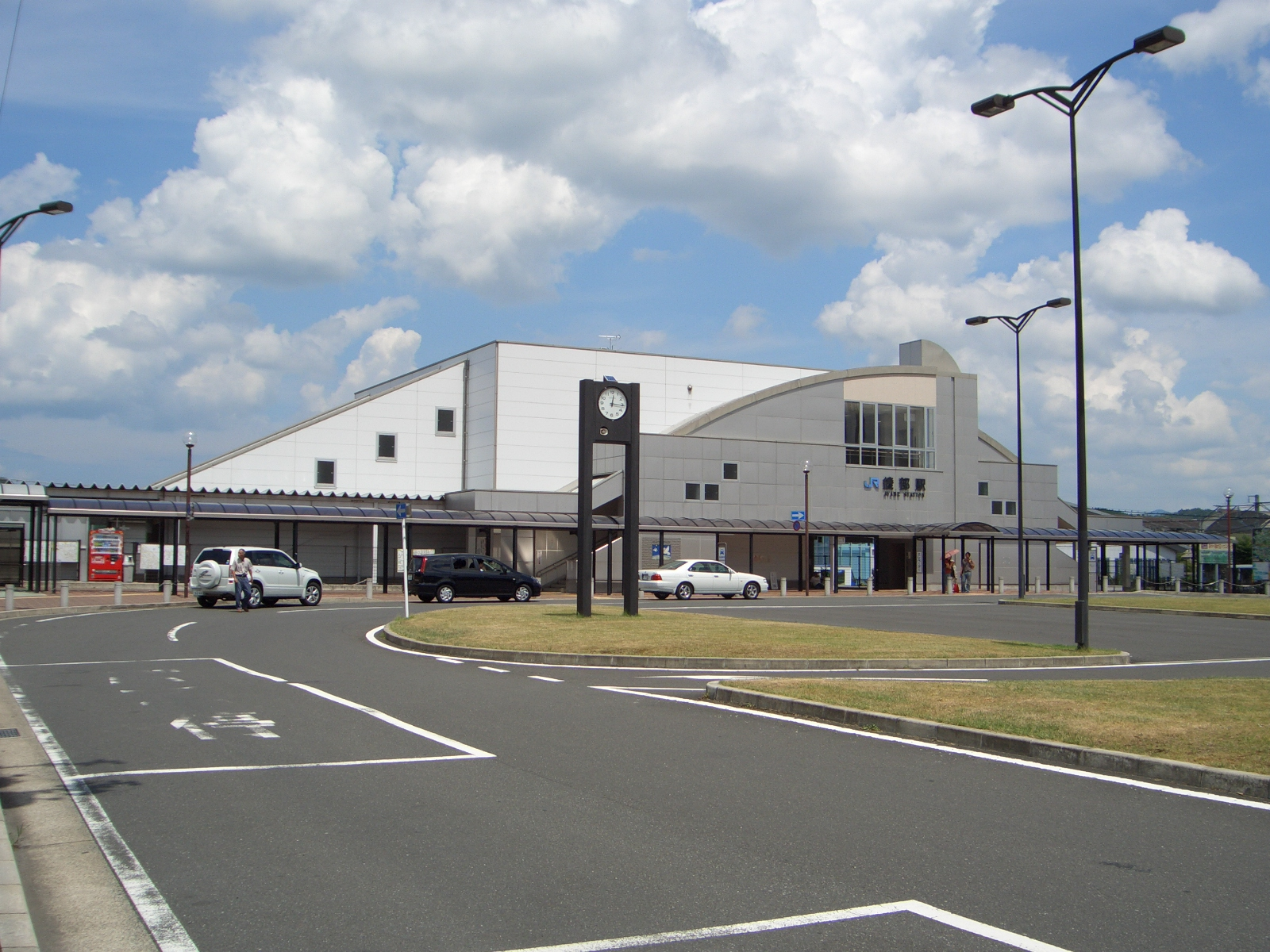
- Ayabe Station south exit, August 2008

General information
- Location: 7-1, Higashi-Ichigatsubo, Saiwai-dori, Ayabe City, Kyoto Prefecture 623-0051; Japan
- Coordinates: 35°18′7.41″N 135°15′9.48″E
- Operator: JR West
- Lines: E San'in Main Line; L Maizuru Line
- Distance: 76.2 km (47.3 miles) from Kyoto
- Platforms: 1 island+ 1 side platform
- Tracks: 3
- Connections: Bus stop

Construction
- Structure type: At grade

Other information
- Status: Staffed
- Website: Official website

History
- Opened: 3 November 1904; 121 years ago

Passengers
- FY 2023: 2,946 daily

Services
Preceding station	JR West	Following station
Takatsu towards Kinosaki-Onsen	San'in Line	Yamaga towards Kyoto
through to San'in Main Line	Maizuru Line Local	Fuchigaki towards Higashi-Maizuru
Location
- Location within Kyoto Prefecture Location within Kansai region Location within Japan

Ayabe Station (綾部駅, Ayabe-eki) is an interchange passenger railway station located in the city of Ayabe, Kyoto Prefecture, Japan, operated by West Japan Railway Company (JR West). The station serves limited expresses "Kinosaki", Maizuru" and Hashidate".

== Lines ==
Ayabe Station is served by the San'in Main Line, and is located 76.2 kilometers from the terminus of the line at Kyoto. It is also the southern terminus of the Maizuru Line, and is 26.4 kilometers from the opposing terminus at Higashi-Maizuru.

== Station layout ==
The station consists of one ground-level island platform and one side platform connected by a footbridge. The station is staffed.

=== Platforms ===
1, 2	■ E San'in Main Line	for Sonobe and Kyoto for Fukuchiyama and Toyooka
1, 2	■ L Maizuru Line	for Nishi-Maizuru and Higashi-Maizuru
3	■ E San'in Main Line	for Fukuchiyama and Toyooka
3	■ L Maizuru Line	for Nishi-Maizuru and Higashi-Maizuru (part of trains)

== Adjacent stations ==
«	Service	»
West Japan Railway Company (JR West)
San'in Main Line
Yamaga	Local (including Sagano Line rapid services)	Takatsu
Wachi; Tachiki (2 eastbound trains)	Rapid service (Sonobe—Fukuchiyama)	Takatsu
Nishi-Maizuru (Maizuru Line)	Limited Express Maizuru	Sonobe; Hiyoshi (Maizuru 2, 11)
Fukuchiyama	Limited Express Kinosaki	Sonobe; Hiyoshi (Kinosaki 2, 4, 15)
Fukuchiyama	Limited Express Hashidate	Sonobe

== History ==
Ayabe Station opened on November 3, 1904. With the privatization of the Japan National Railways (JNR) on April 1, 1987, the station came under the aegis of the West Japan Railway Company.

== Passenger statistics ==
In fiscal 2016, the station was used by an average of 3180 passengers daily (boarding passengers only).

== Surrounding area ==
- Gunze head office
- Ayabe City Hall

== See also ==
- List of railway stations in Japan
