= Kameoka Station =

Railway station in Kameoka, Kyoto Prefecture, Japan

Kameoka Station 亀岡駅
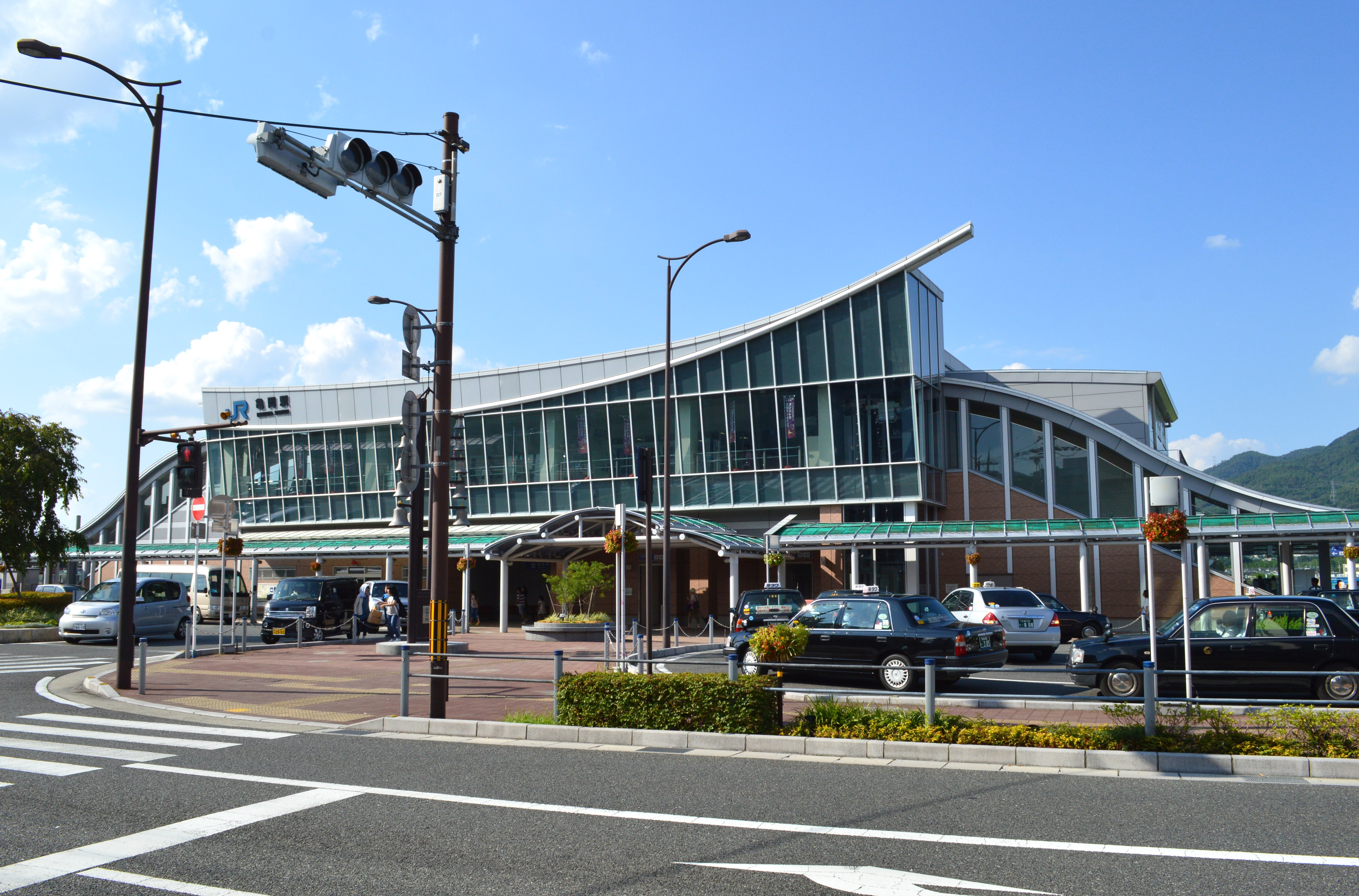
- Kameoka Station in August 2015

General information
- Location: Tanisuji-1-1 Oiwakechō, Kameoka-shi, Kyoto-fu 621-0804; Japan
- Coordinates: 35°0′59.88″N 135°34′56.85″E
- Owner: West Japan Railway Company
- Operator: West Japan Railway Company
- Line: Sagano Line (San'in Main Line)
- Distance: 20.2 km (12.6 miles) from Kyoto
- Platforms: 2 island platforms
- Tracks: 4
- Connections: Bus stop

Construction
- Structure type: Ground level
- Accessible: Yes

Other information
- Status: Staffed (Midori no Madoguchi)
- Station code: JR-E11
- Website: Official website

History
- Opened: 15 August 1899

Passengers
- FY 2023: 16,714 daily

Services
Preceding station	JR West	Following station
Namikawa towards Sonobe	Sagano Line Rapid	Saga-Arashiyama towards Kyoto
Namikawa towards Sonobe	Sagano Line Local	Umahori towards Kyoto
Sonobe towards Kinosaki Onsen	Sagano Line Kinosaki	Nijo towards Kyoto
Sonobe towards Higashi-Maizuru	Sagano Line Maizuru	Nijo towards Kyoto
Sonobe towards Toyooka	Sagano Line Hashidate	Nijo towards Kyoto
Location
- Location within Kyoto Prefecture Location within Japan

Kameoka Station (亀岡駅, Kameoka-eki) is a passenger railway station located in the city of Kameoka, Kyoto Prefecture, Japan, operated by West Japan Railway Company (JR West).

== Lines ==
Kameoka Station is served by the San'in Main Line (Sagano Line), and is located 20.2 kilometres (12.6 miles) from the terminus of the line at Kyoto.

== Station layout ==
The station consists of two ground-level island platforms connected by an elevated station building. The station has a Midori no Madoguchi staffed ticket office. Entrances to the station are on the south and north side of the station.

=== Platforms ===
1, 2	■ San'in Main Line	for Kyoto
3, 4	■ San'in Main Line	for Sonobe and Fukuchiyama

== History ==
Kameoka Station opened on 15 August 1899 when the Kyoto Railway extended the line from Saga to Sonobe. With the privatization of the Japan National Railways (JNR) on 1 April 1987, the station came under the aegis of the West Japan Railway Company. The current station building was completed in 2008.

Station numbering was introduced in March 2018 with Kameoka being assigned station number JR-E11.

== Passenger statistics ==
In fiscal 2019, the station was used by an average of 8749 passengers daily.

== Surrounding area ==
- Kameoka City Hall
- Kameoka City Library
- Kyoto Prefectural Kameoka High School
- Kameoka City Kameoka Junior High School
- Kameoka Municipal Kameoka Elementary School
- Kameoka Municipal Josai Elementary School
- Sanga Stadium by Kyocera

== See also ==
- List of railway stations in Japan
