= Kinosaki (train) =

Japanese limited express train service

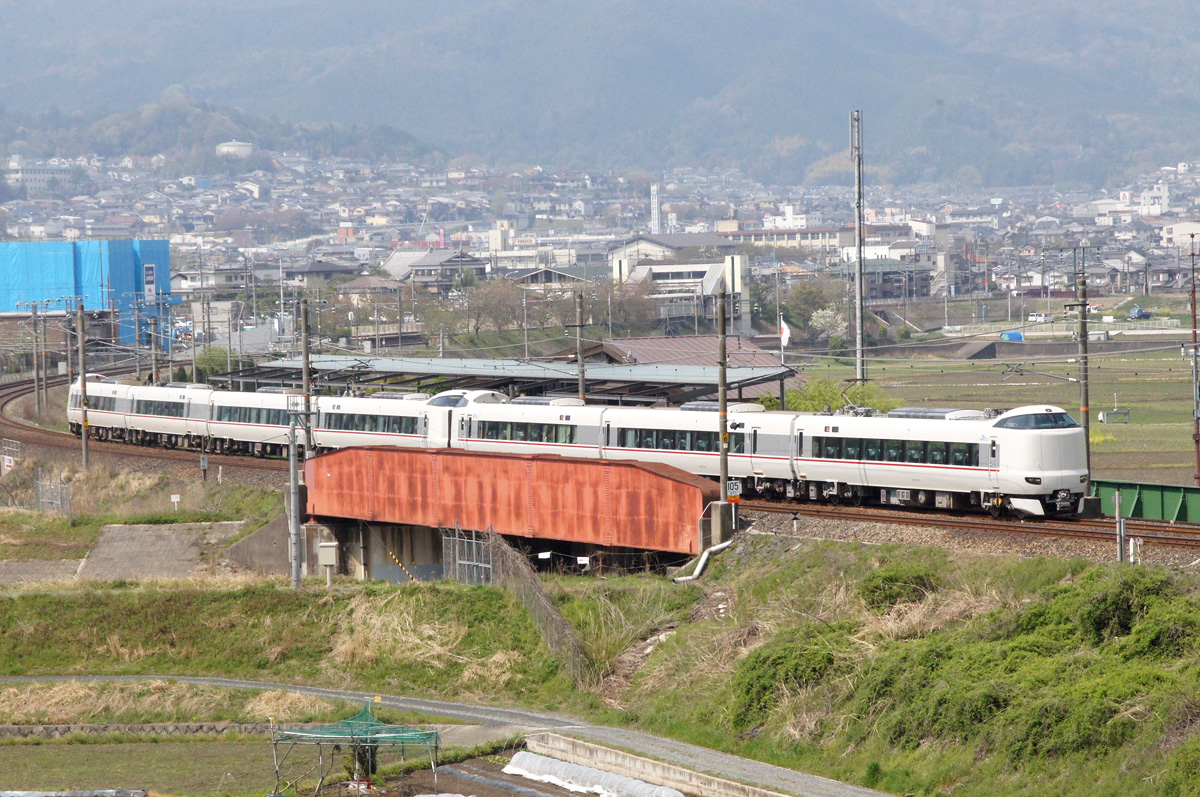
- 287 series EMU on a Kinosaki (4 cars) and Maizuru (3 cars) service, April 2011

Overview
- Service type: Limited express
- First service: 1962
- Current operator(s): JR West

Route
- Line(s) used: Sanin Main Line

Technical
- Rolling stock: 287 series, 289 series EMUs
- Operating speed: 120 km/h (75 mph)

The Kinosaki (きのさき) is a limited express train service operated by West Japan Railway Company (JR West). One of the services making up JR West's "Kitakinki Big X Network" in northern Kansai, it connects Kyoto Station and Kinosaki Onsen Station via the San-in Main Line. The color associated with the service is purple, also the line color of the Sagano Line which it uses for part of its journey.

== Station stops ==
Kyoto - Nijō - Kameoka - Sonobe - Hiyoshi - Ayabe - Fukuchiyama - Wadayama - Yōka - Ebara - Toyooka - Kinosaki Onsen

- Some services stop at Hiyoshi Station.

== Maximum operating speeds ==
- Kyoto – Fukuchiyama: 120 km/h (75 mph)
- Fukuchiyama – Kinosaki Onsen: 95 km/h (60 mph)

== Rolling stock ==
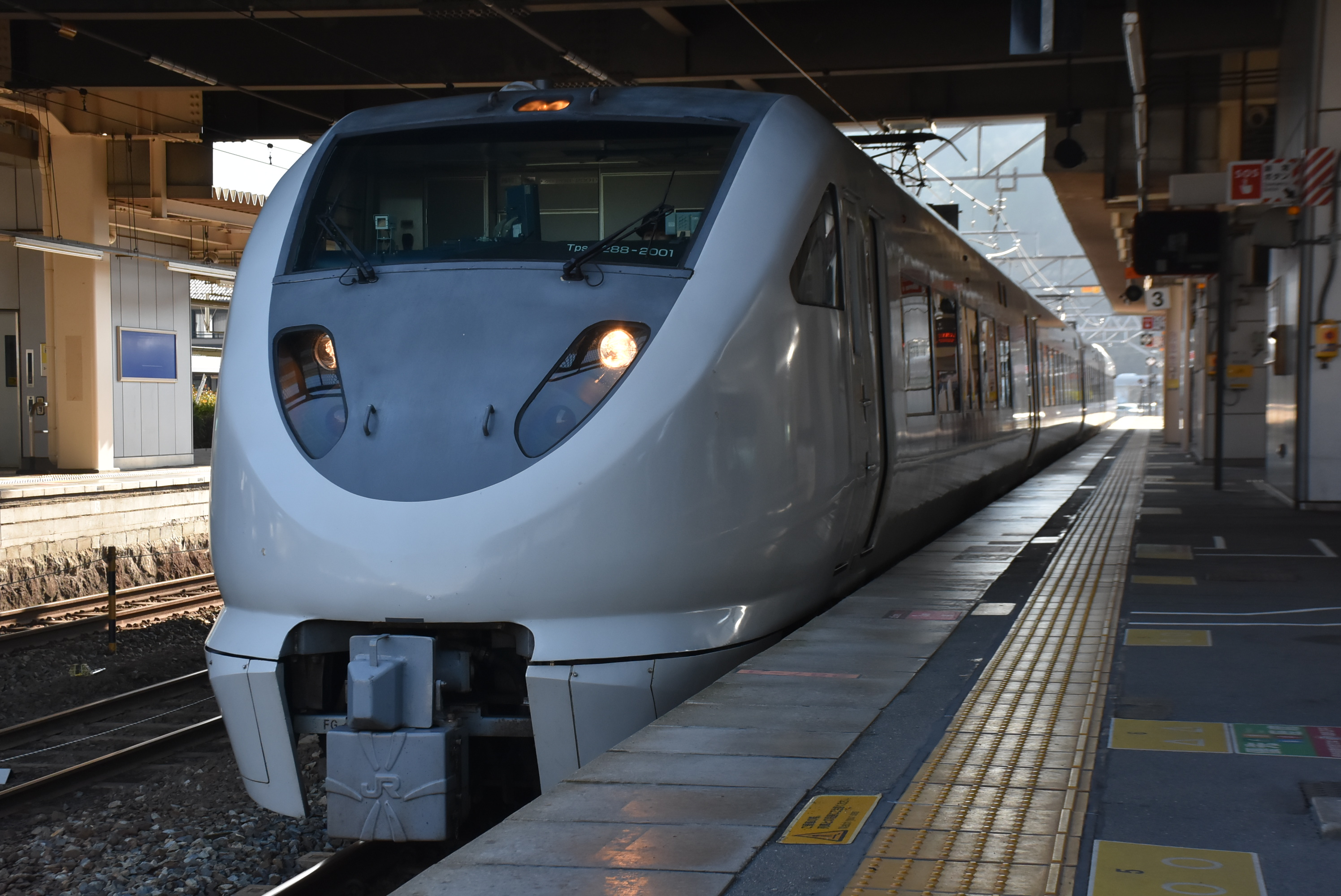
289 series, January 2016

- 287 series EMUs (since 12 March 2011)
- 289 series EMUs (from 31 October 2015)

Kinosaki services are operated with 287 series electric multiple unit (EMU) trains based at Fukuchiyama Depot. Some services operate as combined Kinosaki and Maizuru services. The 287 series EMUs were introduced on these services from 12 March 2011, replacing 183 series sets.

289 series EMUs converted from former dual-voltage 683 series trainsets were introduced on Kinosaki services from 31 October 2015, replacing the remaining JNR-era 381 series trains.

=== Former ===
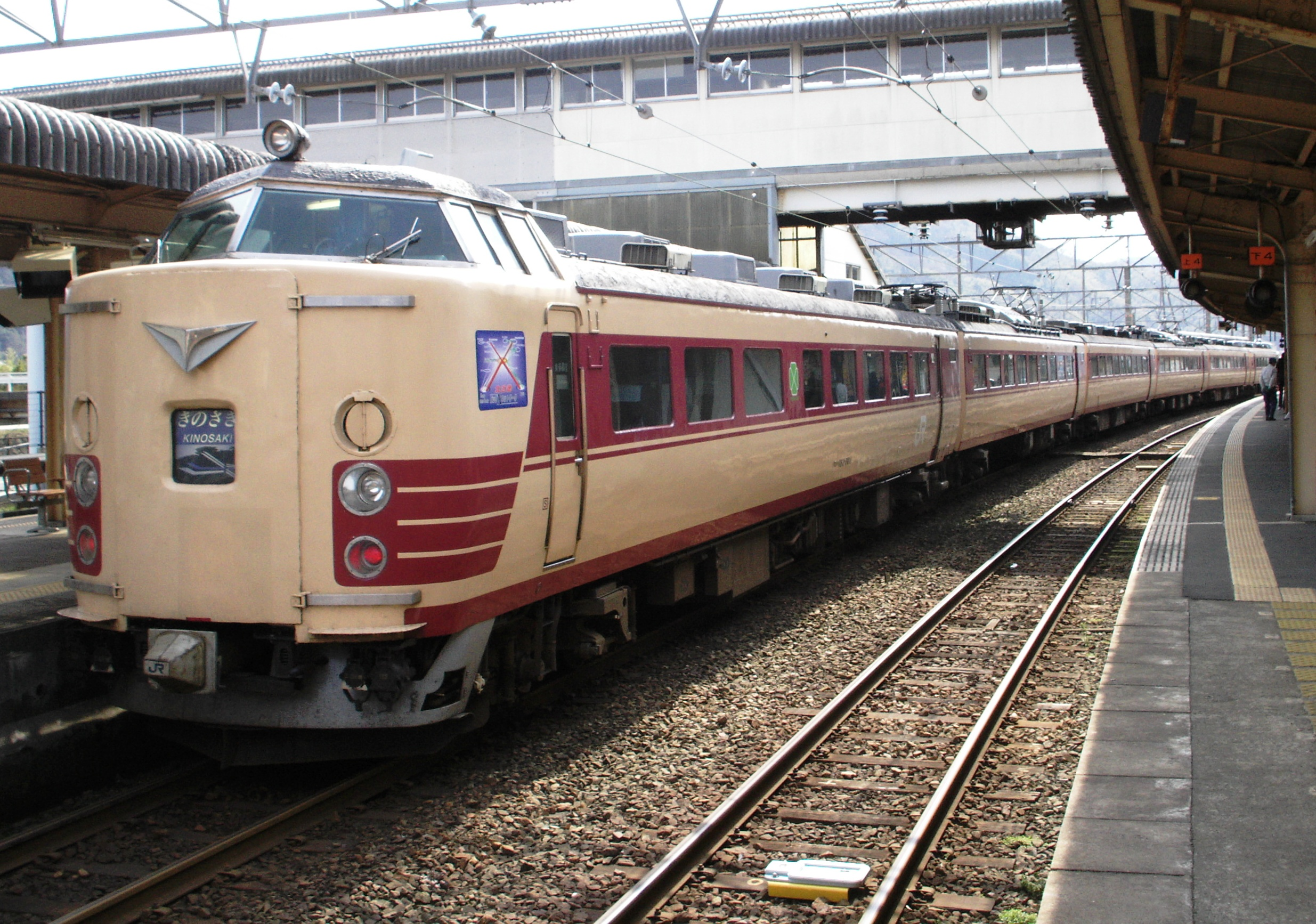
A 183 series train on a Kinosaki service at Kinosaki Onsen Station, March 2007

- 183 series EMUs (until 15 March 2013)
- 381 series EMUs (from 1 June 2012 until 30 October 2015)

183 series EMUs were formerly used on some services, but were withdrawn by the start of the revised timetable on 16 March 2013.

Fukuchiyama-based 381 series EMUs displaced from Kuroshio services were also introduced on Kinosaki services from 1 June 2012. These were withdrawn following the final day of operations on 30 October 2015.

== History ==
The Kinosaki service is named after the service's terminus, formerly known only as Kinosaki Station. Also, when the service began, the neighborhood in which the station stood was known as Kinosaki. Both are derived from the region's well-known area of hot springs.

- March 1, 1962: the Kinosaki service begins as two daily round trips between Kyoto and Kinosaki.
- April 20, 1963: the Kinosaki running from Fukuchiyama Station is renamed to Tango. Daily service consists of four round trips per day.
- March 5, 1966: the Kinosaki and Tango become express services.
- November 10, 1968: Hakuto services departing Kyoto no longer connected with more cars at Ōsaka station. That service becomes the Daisen. The Kinosaki name is discontinued, and Tango services are increased to seven round trips daily. All Tango services are classified as express.
- December 1990: 183 series trains providing seasonal express service between Osaka and Kinosaki are once again called Kinosaki.
- 1995: seasonal express service ends. The following year, it was decided that permanent limited express Kinosaki service would be restored between Kyoto and Kinosaki.
- March 18, 2007: All cars become non-smoking.
- March 16, 2013: From the start of the revised timetable, 183 series EMUs are withdrawn from Kinosaki services.
