= Higashi-Maizuru Station =

Railway station in Maizuru, Kyoto Prefecture, Japan

Higashi-Maizuru Station 東舞鶴駅
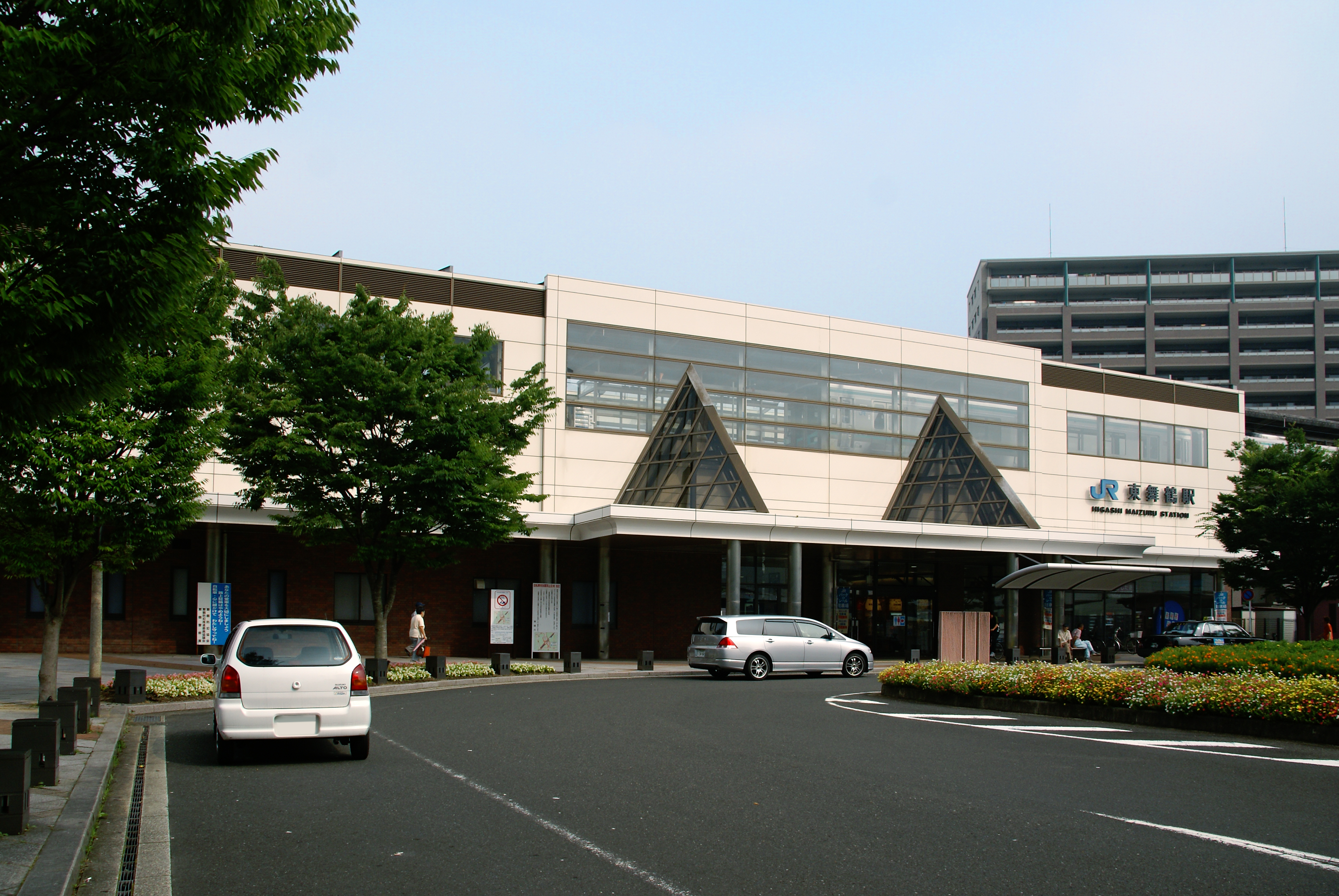
- Higashi-Maizuru Station building in July 2007

General information
- Location: Minamihama-cho, Maizuru, Kyoto Prefecture 625-0057; Japan
- Coordinates: 35°28′07″N 135°23′42″E
- Operator: JR West
- Lines: Maizuru Line; Obama Line
- Platforms: 1 island platform
- Connections: 2

Construction
- Structure type: Elevated

Other information
- Website: Official website

History
- Opened: 3 November 1904; 121 years ago
- Former names: Shin-Maizuru (until 1939)

Passengers
- FY 2023: 2,682 daily

Services
Preceding station	JR West	Following station
Terminus	Obama Line Local	Matsunoodera towards Tsuruga
Nishi-Maizuru towards Ayabe	Maizuru Line Local	Terminus
Location
- Location within Kyoto Prefecture Location within Kansai region Location within Japan

Higashi-Maizuru Station (東舞鶴駅, Higashi-Maizuru-eki) is an interchange passenger railway station located in the city of Maizuru, Kyoto, Japan, and operated by the West Japan Railway Company (JR West).

== Lines ==
Higashi-Maizuru Station is served by the Maizuru Line and is 24.6 kilometers from the terminus of the line at Ayabe. It is also served by the Obama Line and is 84.3 kilometers from the terminus of that line at Tsuruga..

== Station layout ==
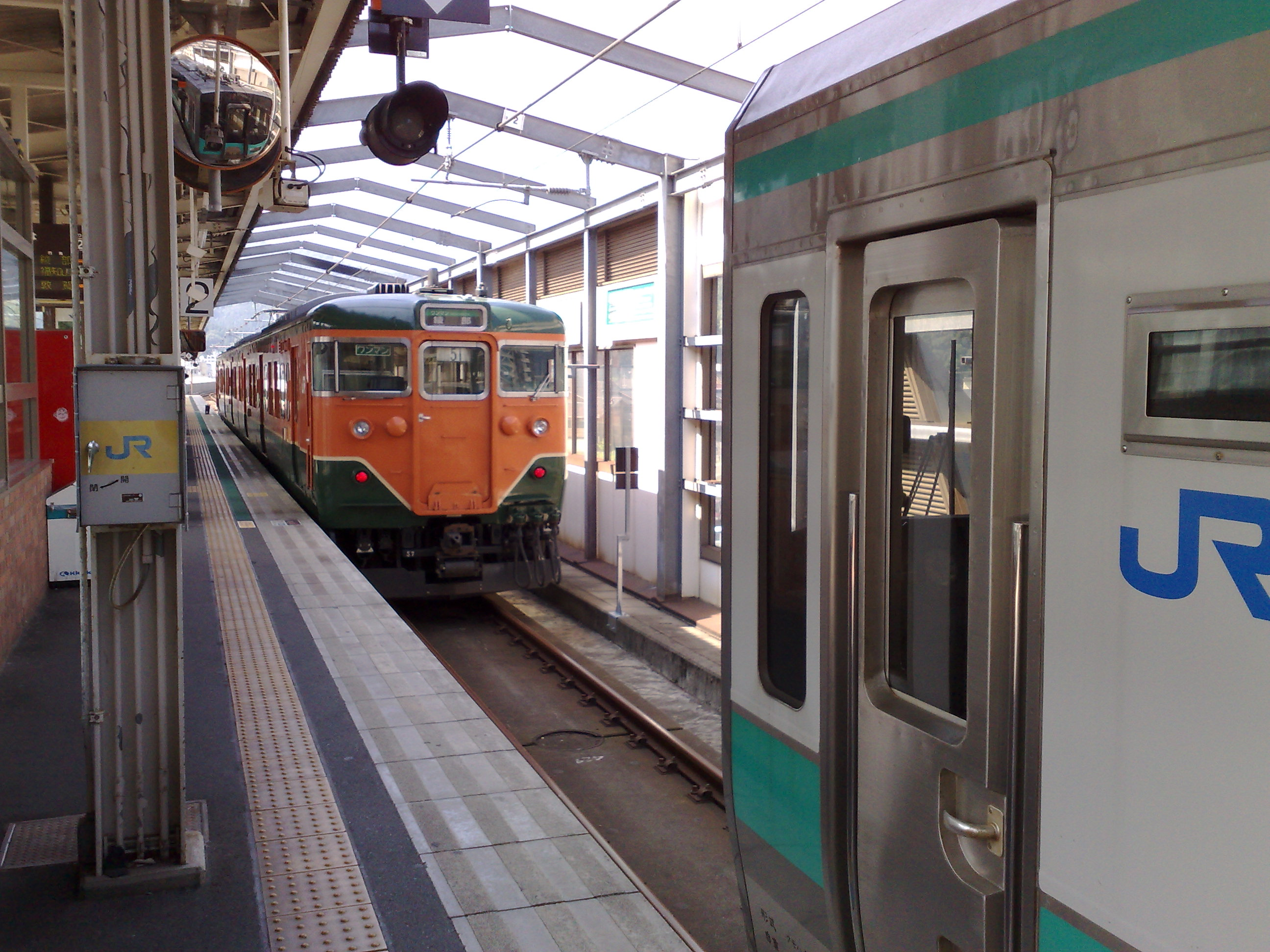
Two trains sharing the same track at Higashi-Maizuru Station

The station consists of one elevated island platform serving two tracks, with the station building underneath. The station has a "Midori no Madoguchi" staffed ticket counter.

=== Platforms ===
1/2	■ Maizuru Line	for Nishi-Maizuru, Ayabe, Fukuchiyama, and Kyoto
1/2	■ Obama Line	for Obama and Tsuruga

Two trains can share the same track.

Trains for the Obama Line use the northern end of the tracks, and trains for the Maizuru Line use the southwestern end of the tracks.

== Adjacent stations ==
«	Service	»
Maizuru Line
Nishi-Maizuru	Maizuru	Terminus

== History ==
The station was opened on 3 November 1904 as Shin-Maizuru Station (新舞鶴駅). It was renamed on 1 June 1939. The original station building was demolished in 1996 when the station was rebuilt as an elevated structure.

== Passenger statistics ==
In fiscal 2019, the station was used by an average of 1,537 passengers daily.

== Surrounding area ==
- Maizuru redbrick warehouses
- Maizuru Redbrick Museum
- Maizuru Police Station
- Maizuru Municipal Hospital
- Maizuru Kyosai Hospital
- National Hospital Organization Maizuru Medical Center

== See also ==
- List of railway stations in Japan
