= West Japan Railway Company =

Japanese railway company

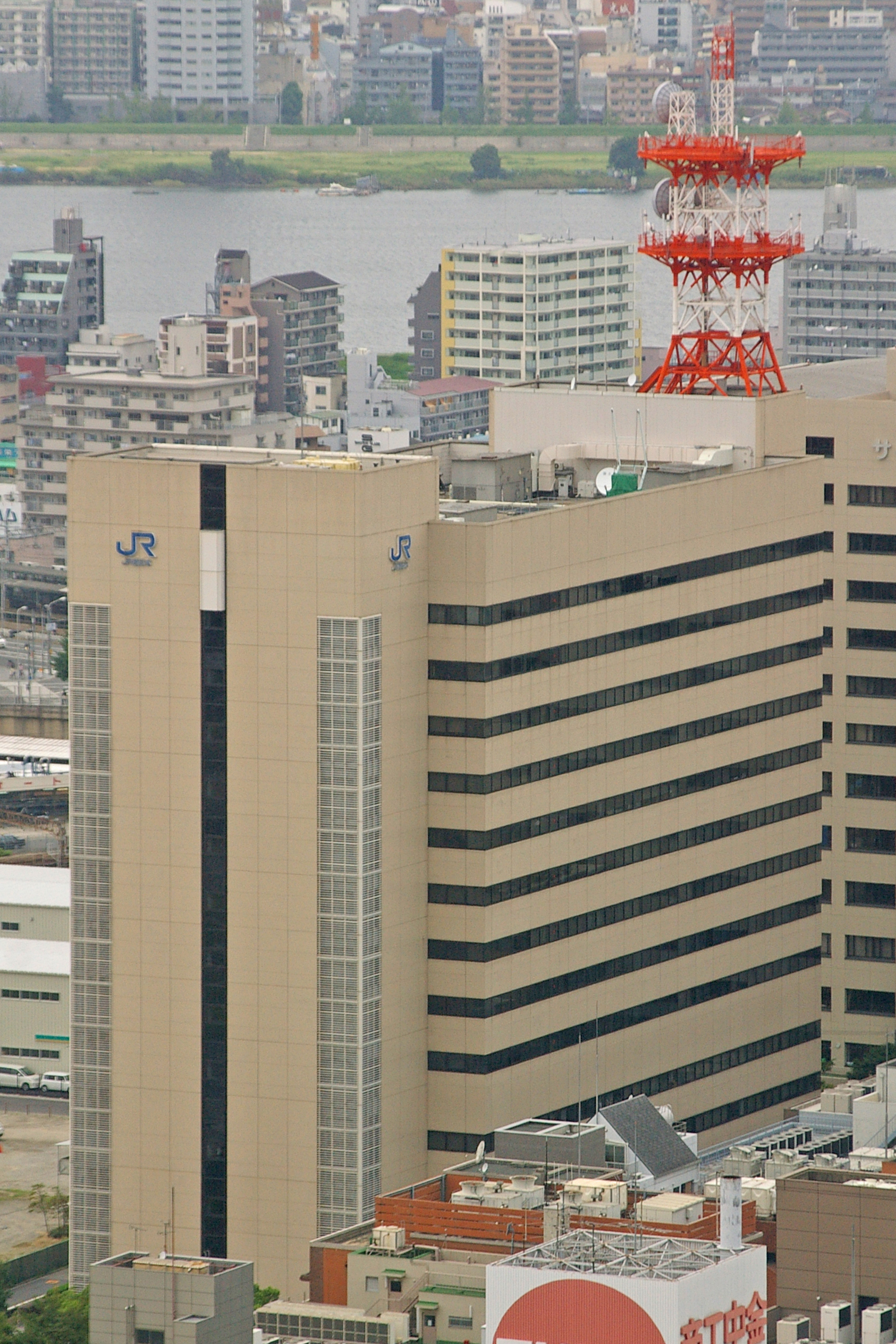
- The company headquarters in Kita-ku, Osaka
- Native name: 西日本旅客鉄道株式会社
- Romanized name: Nishi-nihon Ryokaku Tetsudō Kabushiki-gaisha
- Type: Public
- Traded as: TYO: 9021; Nikkei 225 component; TOPIX Large70 component
- Industry: Rail transport
- Predecessor: Japanese National Railways (JNR)
- Founded: Osaka, Japan (1 April 1987; 39 years ago, privatization of JNR)
- Headquarters: 4-24 Shibata 2-chome, Kita-ku, Osaka, 530-8341, Japan
- Area served: Kansai region; Chūgoku region; Hokuriku region
- Key people: Takayuki Sasaki (Executive Chairman of the Board); Seiji Manabe (Representative Director and President)
- Products: ICOCA (a rechargeable contactless smart card)
- Services: passenger railways; bus services; sales of goods and food services; real estate; other related businesses
- Revenue: ▲¥1,298,913 million (FY 2013)
- Operating income: ▲¥129,497 million (FY 2013)
- Net income: ▲¥60,198 million (FY 2013)
- Total assets: ▲¥2,613,743 million (FY 2013)
- Total equity: ▲¥768,174 million (FY 2013)
- Owners: Investment trusts (TMTBJ 5.52%, JTSB 4.74%); SMBC (3.33%); MUFG Bank (3.27%); Nippon Life (2.08%); As of 31 March 2018
- Number of employees: consolidated: 45,402; non-consolidated: 26,778; (as of March 31, 2012)
- Divisions: Railway operations; Shinkansen management
- Subsidiaries: 64 consolidated subsidiaries; including Sagano Scenic Railway
- Website: westjr.co.jp

West Japan Railway Company

Operation
- National railway: Japan Railways Group
- Infrastructure company: Japan Railway Construction, Transport and Technology Agency

Statistics
- Ridership: 1.778 billion per year
- Passenger-distance: 52.614 billion per year

System length
- Total: 5,012.7 km (3,114.7 mi)
- Double track: 2,253.2 km (1,400.1 mi) (44.9%)
- Electrified: 3,385.7 km (2,103.8 mi) (67.5%)
- High-speed: 644.0 km (400.2 mi) (12.8%)

Track gauge
- Main: 1,067 mm (3 ft 6 in)
- High-speed: 1,435 mm (4 ft 8 1/2 in)

Electrification
- Main: 1,500 V DC overhead catenary 2,447 km (1,520 mi)
- 20 kV AC 60 Hz overhead: 278.0 km (172.7 mi); Hokuriku Main Line (Tsuruga - Itoigawa)
- 25 kV AC 60 Hz overhead: 644.0 km (400.2 mi); Sanyo Shinkansen

Features
- No. of tunnels: 1,016
- Tunnel length: 667 km (414 mi)
- Longest tunnel: The Shin-Kanmon Tunnel; 18,713 metres (61,394 ft); Sanyo Shinkansen (Shin-Shimonoseki - Kokura)
- No. of bridges: 28,568
- Longest bridge: The Yoshii River Bridge; 669 m (2,195 ft); Sanyo Shinkansen (Okayama - Aioi)
- No. of stations: 1,222
Map
- JR West Service Area in West Japan; JR West Service Area in Kansai; ICOCA Service Area

The West Japan Railway Company, also referred to as JR West (JR西日本, Jeiāru Nishi-Nihon; lit. 'JR West Japan'), is one of the Japan Railways Group (JR Group) companies and operates in western Honshu. It has its headquarters in Kita-ku, Osaka. It is listed in the Tokyo Stock Exchange, is a constituent of the TOPIX Large70 index, and is also one of only three Japan Railways Group constituents of the Nikkei 225 index: the others are JR East and JR Central. It was also listed in the Nagoya and Fukuoka stock exchanges until late 2020.

== Lines ==
JR West service region

=== Shinkansen ===
- Hokuriku Shinkansen (Jōetsumyōkō - Tsuruga)
- San'yō Shinkansen
- ■ Hakataminami Line

Officially not a Shinkansen

JR-West's highest-grossing line is the Sanyo Shinkansen high-speed rail line between Osaka and Fukuoka. The Sanyo Shinkansen alone accounts for about 40% of JR-West's passenger revenues. The company also operates Hakata Minami Line, a short commuter line with Shinkansen trains in Fukuoka.

=== Urban Network ===
The "Urban Network" is JR-West's name for its commuter rail lines in the Osaka–Kobe–Kyoto metropolitan area. These lines together comprise 610 km of track, have 245 stations and account for about 43% of JR-West's passenger revenues. Urban Network stations are equipped to handle ICOCA fare cards. Train control on these lines is highly automated, and during peak hours trains run as often as every two minutes.

JR-West's Urban Network competes with a number of private commuter rail operators around Osaka, the "Big 4" being Hankyu Railway/Hanshin Railway (Hankyu bought Hanshin in April 2005), Keihan Railway, Kintetsu, and Nankai Railway. JR-West's market share in the region is roughly equal to that of the Big 4 put together, largely due to its comprehensive network and high-speed commuter trains (Special Rapid Service trains on the Kobe and Kyoto lines operate at up to 130 km/h).

Those in italics are announcement names.

- Akō Line
- Biwako Line

Officially Tōkaidō Main Line, Hokuriku Main Line

- Gakkentoshi Line

Officially Katamachi Line

- Hanwa Line
- Kansai Airport Line
- JR Kobe Line

Officially Tōkaidō Main Line, San'yō Main Line

- Kosei Line
- JR Kyoto Line

Officially Tōkaidō Main Line

- Nara Line
- Osaka Loop Line
- Osaka Higashi Line
- Sagano Line

Officially San'in Main Line

- Man-yo Mahoroba Line

Officially Sakurai Line

- JR Takarazuka Line

Officially Fukuchiyama Line

- JR Tōzai Line
- Yamatoji Line

Officially Kansai Main Line

- Wakayama Line
- JR Yumesaki Line

Officially Sakurajima Line

=== Intercity and regional lines ===
A number of other lines account for more than half of JR-West's track mileage. These lines mainly handle business and leisure travel between smaller cities and rural areas in western Japan. They account for about 20% of the company's passenger revenues.

==== Intercity lines ====
- Fukuchiyama Line

Includes JR Takarazuka Line.

- Hakubi Line
- Hokuriku Main Line

Includes Biwako Line.

- Seto-Ōhashi Line, Chayamachi — Kojima

Officially Seto-Ōhashi Line

- Kansai Main Line, Kameyama — JR Namba

Includes Yamatoji Line.

- Kisei Main Line, Shingū — Wakayamashi

Includes Kinokuni Line.

- San'in Main Line

Includes Sagano Line.

- San'yō Main Line, Kobe — Shimonoseki, Hyōgo — Wadamisaki.

Includes JR Kobe Line.

- ■ Takayama Main Line, Inotani — Toyama
- Tōkaidō Main Line, Maibara — Kobe

Includes Biwako Line, JR Kyoto Line, and JR Kobe Line.

==== Regional lines ====
- Bantan Line
- ■ Etsumi-Hoku Line

Nicknamed Kuzuryū Line

- Fukuen Line
- ■ Gantoku Line
- Geibi Line
- ■ Himi Line
- Inbi Line
- ■ Jōhana Line
- Kabe Line
- Kakogawa Line
- Momotarō Line

Officially Kibi Line

- Kishin Line
- Kisuki Line
- Kure Line

Includes Setouchi Sazanami Line

- Kusatsu Line
- Maizuru Line
- Mine Line
- ■ Nanao Line
- ■ Obama Line
- ■ Ōito Line, Minami-Otari — Itoigawa
- ■ Onoda Line
- Sakai Line
- Tsuyama Line
- ■ Ube Line
- Uno-Port Line

Officially Uno Line

- Yamaguchi Line
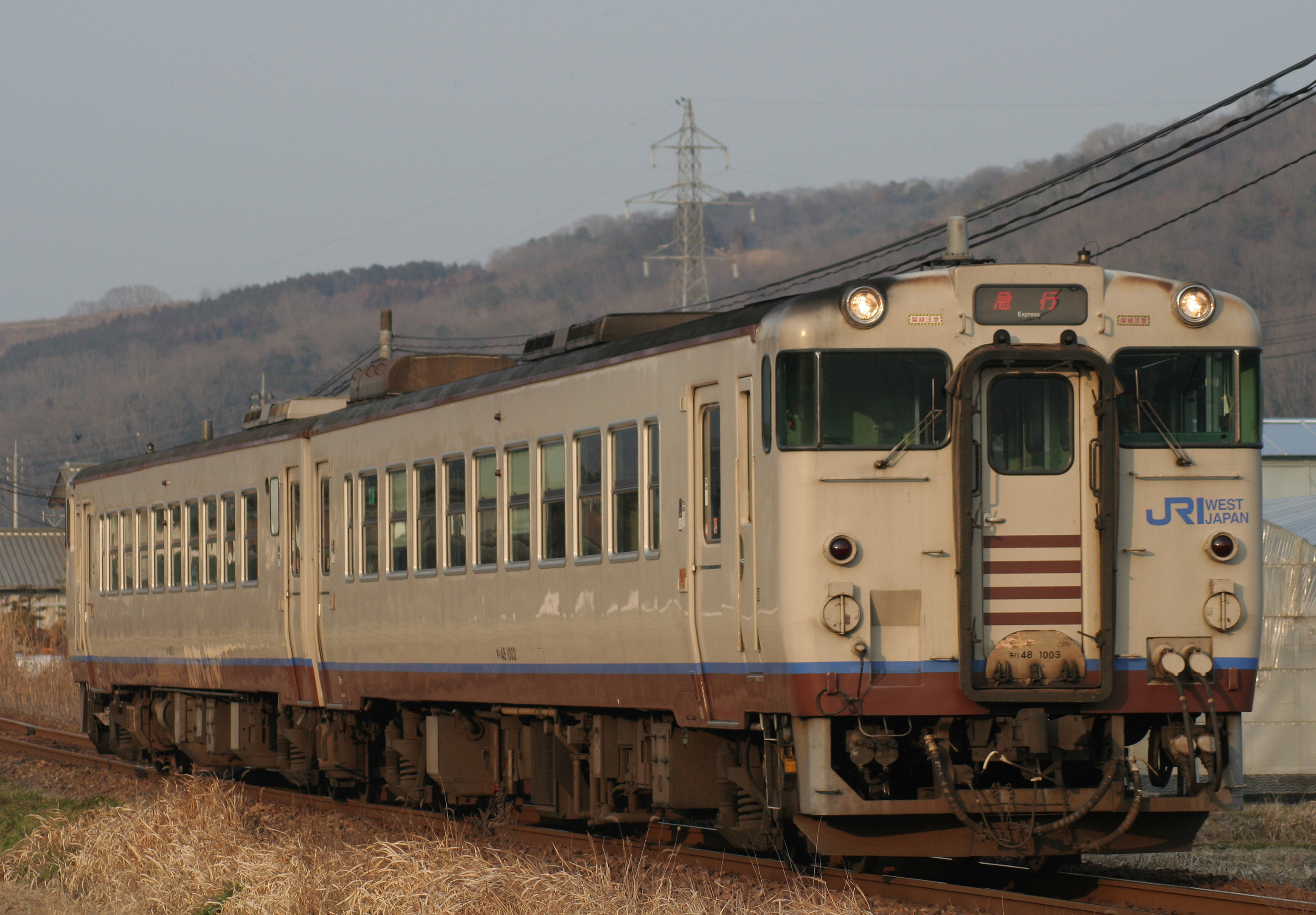
A diesel train on a Tsuyama Line express service

== Named train services ==
Limited express services operated by JR West include:

- Haruka, Kuroshio
- Thunderbird, Shirasagi
- Noto Kagaribi
- Kounotori, Hamakaze
- Rakuraku Harima
- Rakuraku Yamato, Mahoroba
- Kinosaki, Hashidate, Maizuru
- Yakumo
- Super Hakuto, Super Inaba
- Super Matsukaze, Super Oki
- Sunrise Seto, Sunrise Izumo
- Rakuraku Biwako

Limited express trains operated by other JR Group companies which also serve stations in the JR West area include the Hida, Nanki, Shiokaze, and Nampu.

== Other businesses ==
JR-West subsidiaries include the following.

- West Japan Railway Hotel Development Company - Owns Hotel Granvia Kyoto, Hotel Granvia Osaka, Hotel Granvia Wakayama, Hotel Granvia Okayama, Hotel Granvia Hiroshima, Nara Hotel, Sannomiya Terminal Hotel and Hotel Hopinn Aming
- West Japan Railway Isetan - A joint venture with Isetan Mitsukoshi Holdings Ltd; operates the Isetan department store in Kyoto Station
- West JR Bus Company - Intercity bus operator
- Chūgoku JR Bus Company - Intercity bus operator
- Japan Railway West Trading Co.
- Nippon Travel Agency Co., Ltd.
- Sagano Scenic Railway
- JR-West Miyajima Ferry Company - operator of JR Miyajima Ferry service to the island of Miyajima

== History ==
JR-West was incorporated as a business corporation (kabushiki kaisha) on April 1, 1987, as part of the breakup of the state-owned Japanese National Railways (JNR). Initially, it was a wholly owned subsidiary of the JNR Settlement Corporation (JNRSC), a special company created to hold the assets of the former JNR while they were shuffled among the new JR companies.

For the first four years of its existence, JR-West leased its highest-revenue line, the Sanyō Shinkansen, from the separate Shinkansen Holding Corporation. JR-West purchased the line in October 1991 at a cost of 974.1 billion JPY (about US$7.2 billion) in long-term debt.

JNRSC sold 68.3% of JR-West in an initial public offering on the Tokyo Stock Exchange in October 1996. After JNRSC was dissolved in October 1998, its shares of JR-West were transferred to the government-owned Japan Railway Construction Public Corporation (JRCC), which merged into the Japan Railway Construction, Transport and Technology Agency (JRTT) as part of a bureaucratic reform package in October 2003. JRTT offered all of its shares in JR-West to the public in an international IPO in 2004, ending the era of government ownership of JR-West. JR-West is now listed on the Tokyo Stock Exchange, Nagoya Stock Exchange, Osaka Securities Exchange and Fukuoka Stock Exchange.

== Accidents and incidents ==
- Shigaraki train disaster: A collision between a JR West and a Shigaraki Kōgen Railway train in Shigaraki (now Koka), Shiga Prefecture on 14 May 1991, killed 42 people.
- Amagasaki derailment: A train derailment in Amagasaki, Hyōgo Prefecture on 25 April 2005, killed 107 people.
