= List of mergers in Kyoto Prefecture =

Here is a list of mergers in Kyoto Prefecture, Japan since the Heisei era.

== Mergers from April 1, 1999 to Present ==
- On April 1, 2004 - the towns of Mineyama and Omiya (both from Naka District), the towns of Amino, Tango and Yasaka (all from Takeno District), and the town of Kumihama (from Kumano District) were merged to create the city of Kyōtango. Naka, Takeno and Kumano Districts were all dissolved as a result of this merger.
- On April 1, 2005 - the town of Keihoku (from Kitakuwada District) was merged into the expanded city of Kyoto, specifically at Ukyo Ward.
- On October 11, 2005 - the towns of Tamba, Mizuho and Wachi (all from Funai District) were merged to create the town of Kyōtamba.
- On January 1, 2006 - the towns of Miwa and Yakuno (both from Amata District), and the town of Ōe (from Kasa District) were merged into the expanded city of Fukuchiyama. Amata District and Kasa District were both dissolved as a result of this merger.
- On January 1, 2006 - the towns of Hiyoshi, Sonobe and Yagi (all from Funai District), and the town of Miyama (from Kitakuwada District) were merged to create the city of Nantan. Kitakuwada District was dissolved as a result of this merger.
- On March 1, 2006 - the towns of Iwataki, Kaya and Nodagawa (all from Yosa District) were merged to create the town of Yosano.
- On March 12, 2007 - the towns of Kamo, Kizu and Yamashiro (all from Sōraku District) were merged to create the city of Kizugawa.
