= Hiyoshi (disambiguation) =

Hiyoshi is a part of the city of Yokohama, Kanagawa Prefecture, Japan.

Hiyoshi may also refer to the following places in Japan:

- Hiyoshi, Ehime, a former village in Kitauwa District
- Hiyoshi, Kagoshima, a former town in Hioki District
- Hiyoshi, Kyoto, a former town in Funai District
- Hiyoshi, Nagano, a former village in Kiso District
- Hiyoshi Dam, a dam in Nantan, Kyoto Prefecture

== See also ==
- Hiyoshi Station (disambiguation)
