= Tachiki Station =

Railway station in Kyōtamba, Kyoto Prefecture, Japan

Tachiki Station 立木駅
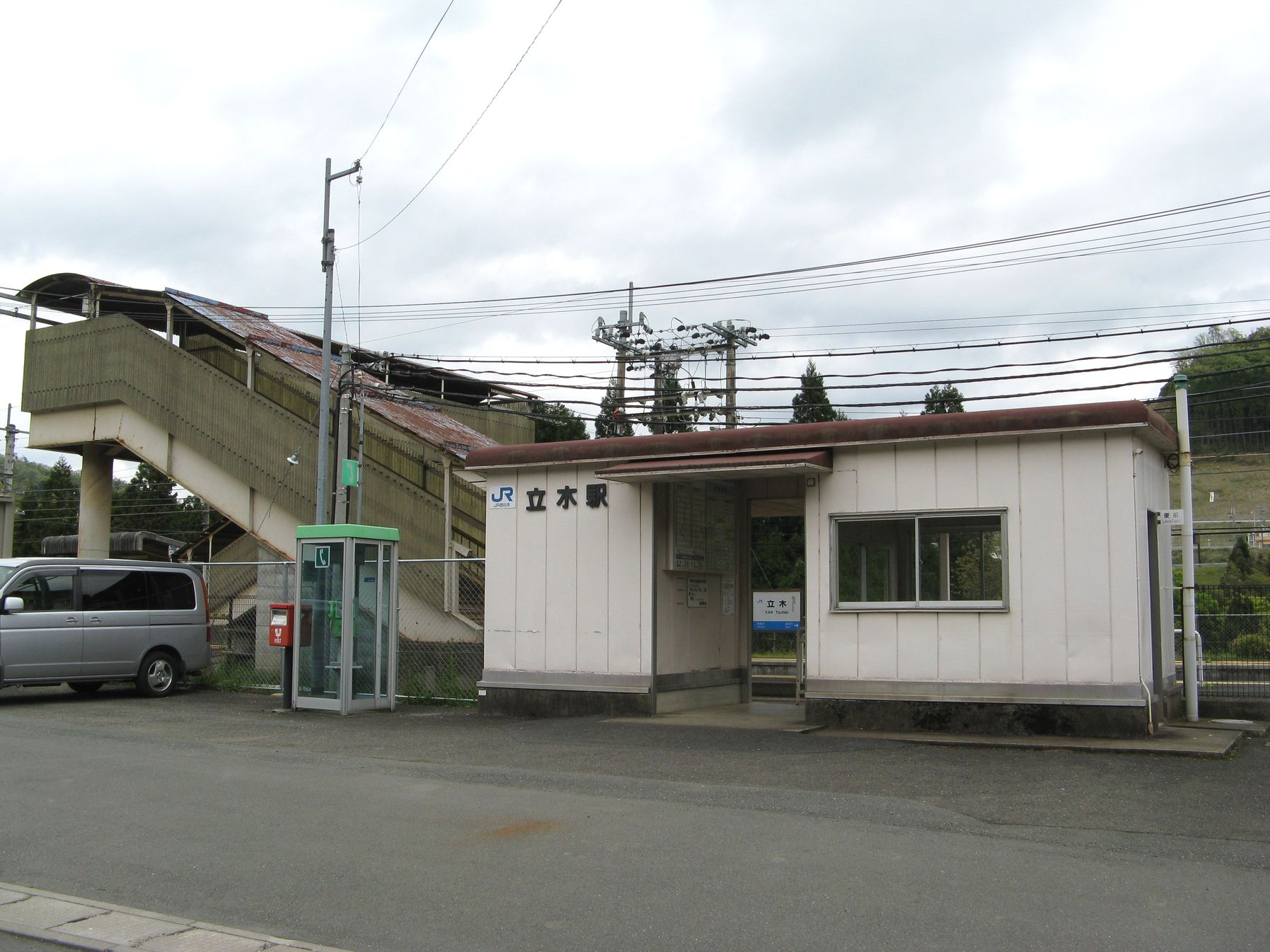
- Tachiki Station, April 2009

General information
- Location: Hokujo Hirono, Kyōtamba Town, Funai District, Kyoto Prefecture 629-1144; Japan
- Coordinates: 35.2741°N 135.3372°E
- Owner: JR West
- Operator: JR West
- Line: San'in Main Line
- Distance: 65.5 km (40.7 miles) from Kyoto
- Platforms: 2 side platforms
- Tracks: 2
- Connections: Bus stop

Construction
- Structure type: At grade

Other information
- Status: Unstaffed
- Website: Official website

History
- Opened: 1 November 1947; 78 years ago

Passengers
- FY 2023: 18 daily
Location
- Location within Kyoto Prefecture Location within Japan

Tachiki Station (立木駅, Tachiki-eki) is a passenger railway station located in the town of Kyōtamba, Funai District, Kyoto Prefecture, Japan, operated by West Japan Railway Company (JR West).

== Lines ==
Tachiki Station is served by the San'in Main Line, and is located 65.5 kilometers from the terminus of the line at Kyoto.

== Station layout ==
The station consists of two opposed ground-level side platforms connected to the station building by a footbridge. The station is unattended.

=== Platforms ===
1	San'in Main Line	for Ayabe and Fukuchiyama
2	San'in Main Line	for Sonobe and Kyoto

== Adjacent stations ==
«	Service	»
West Japan Railway Company (JR West) San'in Main Line
Aseri	Local	Yamaga
Wachi	Rapid service	Ayabe

== History ==
Tachiki Station opened on April 25, 1946, as a signal stop, and was upgraded to a full passenger station on November 1, 1947. With the privatization of the Japan National Railways (JNR) on April 1, 1987, the station came under the aegis of the West Japan Railway Company.

== Passenger statistics ==
In fiscal 2016, the station was used by an average of 18 passengers daily.

== Surrounding area ==
- Yura River
- Japan National Route 27

== See also ==
- List of railway stations in Japan
