= College of Medical Technology Meiji University of Oriental Medicine =

Private junior college in Hiyoshi, Japan

Coordinates: 35.181629°N 135.491226°E

- 明治鍼灸大学医療技術短期大学部
- Type: private
- Established: 2002
- Location: Nantan, Japan
- Website: www.meiji-u.ac.jp/daigaku/enkaku

College of Medical Technology Meiji University of Oriental Medicine (明治鍼灸大学医療技術短期大学部, Meiji Shinkyu Daigaku Iryogijutsu Tanki Daigakubu) was a private junior college in Hiyoshi, Kyoto or Nantan at present, Japan. It was established in 2002, and abolished in 2008.

== See also ==
- Meiji University of Integrative Medicine
