= Hiromu Nonaka =

Japanese politician (1925–2018)

- 野中 廣務
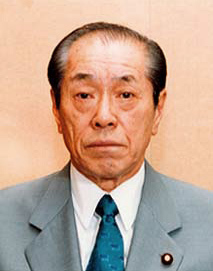
- Official portrait, 1998

Director-General of the Okinawa Development Agency
- In office 14 January 1999 – 5 October 1999
- Prime Minister: Keizo Obuchi
- Preceded by: Kichio Inoue
- Succeeded by: Mikio Aoki

Chief Cabinet Secretary
- In office 5 October 1998 – 30 July 1999
- Prime Minister: Keizo Obuchi
- Preceded by: Kanezo Muraoka
- Succeeded by: Mikio Aoki

Minister of Home Affairs
- In office 30 June 1994 – 8 August 1995
- Prime Minister: Tomiichi Murayama
- Preceded by: Hajime Ishii
- Succeeded by: Takashi Fukaya

Chairman of the National Public Safety Commission
- In office 30 June 1994 – 8 August 1995
- Prime Minister: Tomiichi Murayama
- Preceded by: Hajime Ishii
- Succeeded by: Takashi Fukaya

Member of the House of Representatives
- In office 8 August 1983 – 10 October 2003
- Preceded by: Shigesaburō Maeo
- Succeeded by: Hideo Tanaka
- Constituency: Kyoto 2nd (1983–1996); Kyoto 4th (1996–2003)

Member of the Kyoto Prefectural Assembly
- In office 23 April 1967 – May 1978
- Constituency: Funai District

Mayor of Sonobe
- In office 1958–1966
- Preceded by: Tashiro Nishida
- Succeeded by: Gentaro Nonoguchi

Member of the Sonobe Town Council
- In office 1951–1958

Personal details
- Born: 20 October 1925 Sonobe, Kyoto, Japan
- Died: 26 January 2018 (aged 92) Shimogyō, Kyoto, Japan
- Party: Liberal Democratic
- Children: 3

Hiromu Nonaka (野中 廣務, Nonaka Hiromu; 20 October 1925 – 26 January 2018) was a Japanese politician of the Liberal Democratic Party.

Nonaka served as a local politician in Kyoto Prefecture from 1951 to 1978 and in the House of Representatives from 1983 to 2003, becoming one of its most prominent members in the 1990s. Nonaka served as Minister of Home Affairs and Head of the National Public Safety Commission from 1994 to 1995, as Chief Cabinet Secretary from 1998 to 1999, and as Head of the Okinawa Development Agency in 1999. Nonaka was widely considered as a voice of reason within the Liberal Democratic Party and viewed by some as the most powerful person in Japan during the mid-to-late 1990s.

== Early life and local political career ==
Hiromu Nonaka was born on 20 October 1925 in Sonobe, Kyoto Prefecture (now part of the city of Nantan) into a family of burakumin background. After graduating from Kyoto Prefectural Sonobe Junior High School in 1943, Nonaka worked for the Japanese National Railways (JNR) in Osaka, an office managed at the time by future prime minister Eisaku Sato.

Nonaka encountered discrimination in his youth as a member of the burakumin group, and later said this discrimination was a factor in his decision to leave JNR and enter politics. Nonaka entered local politics in Sonobe, where he served as a member of the local assembly from 1951 to 1958, and as mayor from 1958 to 1966. Nonaka then won a seat in the Kyoto Prefectural Assembly and served from 1967 to 1978. Nonaka briefly served as vice-governor of Kyoto Prefecture in 1978, but resigned to establish and serve as the chairman of Japan's first care facility for individuals with profound physical disabilities.

== Diet career ==
Nonaka entered the House of Representatives through the Kyoto 2nd district by-election of 1983, in which two seats were open following the death of incumbent representatives Senichi Tanigaki and Shigesaburō Maeo. Tanigaki's son Sadakazu Tanigaki won the most votes in the election, followed by Nonaka.

In the 1980s, Nonaka was part of the House faction headed by Prime Minister Noboru Takeshita of the Liberal Democratic Party (LDP). In 1988, Nonaka rose to prominence following the Recruit scandal, which led to the collapse of the Takeshita's faction. The 1993 general election saw the LDP enter the opposition in Japan for the first time in decades. As few LDP Diet members had experience being part of the opposition, Nonaka drew on his experience as part of the local and prefectural assembly opposition in Kyoto to become one of the most prominent Diet critics of the government of Morihiro Hosokawa.

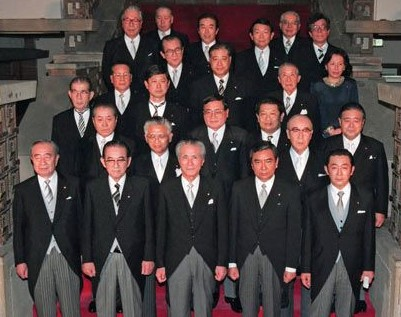
Hiromu Nonaka was inaugurated as Minister of State on June 30, 1994.

Following the collapse of the Hosokawa-led coalition in 1994, Nonaka entered the Cabinet for the first time as part of the government of Tomiichi Murayama.

Nonaka served as Minister of Home Affairs through the Tokyo subway sarin attack of 1995, and drew attention for his personal apology to a suspect falsely accused of poisoning his wife and neighbors with sarin.

In 1998, at the request of Prime Minister Ryutaro Hashimoto, Nonaka travelled to China to express remorse to victims of the Nanjing massacre. Later that year, in response to a demand for further apologies by General Secretary of the Chinese Communist Party Jiang Zemin, Nonaka described the issue as a "finished problem."

In 1998, Nonaka was named Chief Cabinet Secretary under Prime Minister Keizō Obuchi, where he wielded an unusual amount of power in this role. Nonaka was viewed by many insiders as a shadow leader of the government, arranging a major bank bailout plan and bringing the faction led by Ichiro Ozawa into the governing coalition. A TIME article in December 1998 called Nonaka "Japan's most powerful man."

In 2000, as LDP secretary-general, Nonaka played a key role in defeating a no-confidence motion against Prime Minister Yoshiro Mori.

In 2001, Nonaka was seen as a contender for the presidency of the LDP, and thereby for Prime Minister of Japan. Nonaka was reluctant to take the position as it would place his background as a burakumin in the spotlight. During his candidacy, future Prime Minister Tarō Asō allegedly made remarks disparaging towards Nonaka's burakumin heritage, for which Nonaka later remarked that he would "never forgive" Asō. Asō denied making the remarks when questioned in 2005. Nonaka ultimately supported Ryutaro Hashimoto in the election, but Hashimoto lost to Junichiro Koizumi.

Koizumi's politics led to a decline in the power of LDP factions, and Nonaka vigorously opposed the re-election of Koizumi as LDP president in September 2003, stating that "this election will decide whether Japan will be able to survive or go into decline as a nation." After Koizumi was re-elected, Nonaka announced his retirement from politics in October 2003. Nonaka did not run in the 2003 general election, but campaigned for the LDP candidate in his district in Kyoto Prefecture.

== Post-retirement ==
Following his 2003 departure from the Diet, Nonaka served as chairman of the National Federation of Land Improvement Industry Groups, a powerful supporter of the LDP. After the formation of the Democratic Party of Japan government in 2009, Nonaka resigned from the LDP in 2011 for the stated reason of preserving his neutrality. However, Nonaka rejoined the LDP in 2016.

On 5 June 2013, Nonaka led a delegation including former Prime Minister Yukio Hatoyama to visit Beijing and confer with Liu Yunshan, a member of the Politburo Standing Committee of the Chinese Communist Party. Nonaka told reporters that as a young politician in the 1970s, he had heard Kakuei Tanaka state that an agreement had been reached to shelve the dispute between Japan and China over the Senkaku Islands in order to normalize relations between the countries. Chief Cabinet Secretary Yoshihide Suga denied the claim as "baseless" and alleged that Nonaka had been influenced by "Chinese hospitality."

In 2017, Nonaka publicly criticized the LDP's plans to revise Article 9 of the Japanese Constitution, stating that "Japan should not go through the history of war again."

== Death ==
Nonaka died on 26 January 2018, at the age of 92, at a hospital in the Shimogyō Ward of Kyoto.

House of Representatives (Japan)
Preceded by Yoshiteru Uekusa	Chair, Lower House Committee on Communications; 1991	Succeeded by Sadakazu Tanigaki
Preceded by Makoto Koga	Chair, Lower House Committee on Construction; 1993	Succeeded by Kazuo Torii
Political offices
Preceded by Hajime Ishii	Minister of Home Affairs; 1994–1995	Succeeded by Takashi Fukaya
Preceded by Hajime Ishii	Chairman of the National Public Safety Commission; 1994–1995	Succeeded by Takashi Fukaya
Preceded by Kanezo Muraoka	Chief Cabinet Secretary; 1998–1999	Succeeded by Mikio Aoki
Preceded by Kichio Inoue	Director of the Okinawa Development Agency; 1999	Succeeded by Mikio Aoki
Party political offices
Preceded by Yoshirō Mori	Secretary-General of the Liberal Democratic Party; 2000	Succeeded by Makoto Koga
