= Aseri Station =

Railway station in Kyōtamba, Kyoto Prefecture, Japan

Aseri Station 安栖里駅
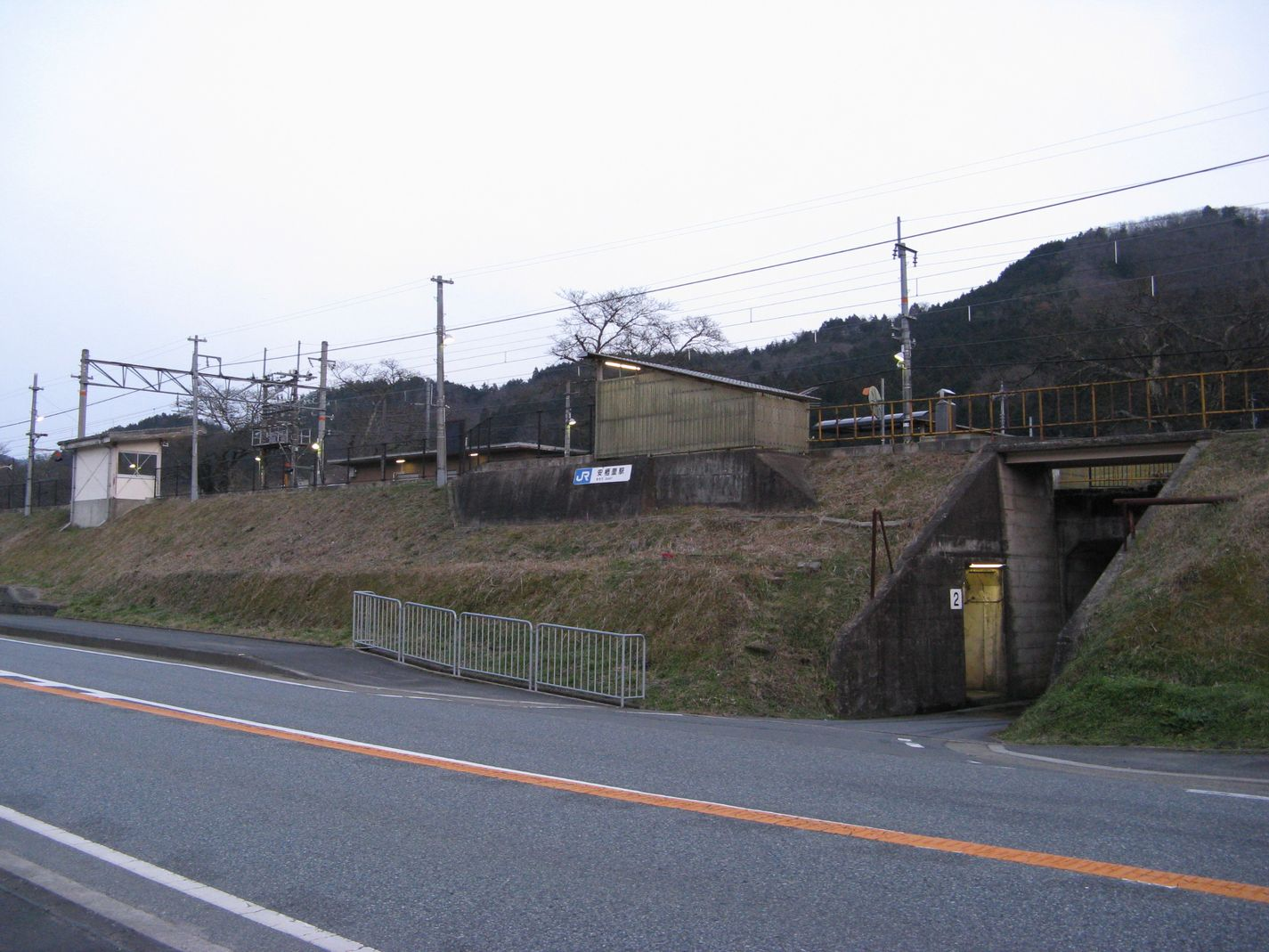
- Aseri Station of the San'in Main Line, view from National Highway No. 27

General information
- Location: Hagio Aseri,, Kyōtamba-cho, Funai-gun, Kyoto-fu 629-1141; Japan
- Coordinates: 35.2662°N 135.3851°E
- Owner: West Japan Railway Company
- Operator: West Japan Railway Company
- Line: San'in Main Line
- Distance: 60.7 km (37.7 miles) from Kyoto
- Platforms: 2 side platforms
- Connections: Bus stop

Other information
- Status: Unstaffed
- Website: Official website

History
- Opened: 11 February 1957

Passengers
- FY 2023: 32 daily

Services
Preceding station	JR West	Following station
Tachiki towards Kinosaki-Onsen	San'in Line Local Rapid	Wachi towards Kyoto
Location
- Location within Kyoto Prefecture Location within Japan

Aseri Station (安栖里駅, Aseri-eki) is a passenger railway station located in the town of Kyōtamba, Funai District, Kyoto Prefecture, Japan, operated by West Japan Railway Company (JR West).

== Lines ==
Aseri Station is served by the San'in Main Line, and is located 60.7 kilometers from the terminus of the line at Kyoto.

== Station layout ==
The station consists of two opposed ground-level side platforms on an embankment, connected to the station building by an underground passage. The station is unattended.

=== Platforms ===
1	■ San'in Main Line	for Ayabe and Fukuchiyama
2	■ San'in Main Line	for Sonobe and Kyoto

== History ==
Aseri Station opened on February 11, 1957. With the privatization of the Japan National Railways (JNR) on April 1, 1987, the station came under the aegis of the West Japan Railway Company.

== Passenger statistics ==
In fiscal 2016, the station was used by an average of 28 passengers daily.

== Surrounding area ==
- Yura River
- Japan National Route 27

== See also ==
- List of railway stations in Japan
