= Kyoto 4th district =

Japan House of Representatives constituency

- Parliamentary constituency for the Japanese House of Representatives
- Numbered map of Kyoto Prefecture single-member districts
- Prefecture: Kyoto
- Proportional District: Kinki
- Electorate: 392,075

Current constituency
- Created: 1994
- Seats: One
- Party: LDP
- Representatives: Keiro Kitagami
- Municipalities: Kameoka, Nantan, Funai District and Nishikyō-ku and Ukyō-ku of Kyoto City.

Kyoto 4th district (京都府第4区, Kyoto-fu dai-yonku or simply 京都4区, Kyoto-yonku ) is a single-member constituency of the House of Representatives in the national Diet of Japan located in Kyoto Prefecture.

== List of representatives ==
Election	Representative	Party	Notes
1996	Hiromu Nonaka	Liberal Democratic	
2000	Hiromu Nonaka	Liberal Democratic	
2003	Hideo Tanaka	Liberal Democratic	(Note: Tanaka failed to win the Liberal Democratic Party's nomination and became an independent because he voted against the postal service privatization law submitted by the Second Koizumi Cabinet.)
2003	Hideo Tanaka	Independent	(Note: Tanaka failed to win the Liberal Democratic Party's nomination and became an independent because he voted against the postal service privatization law submitted by the Second Koizumi Cabinet.)
2005	Yasuhiro Nakagawa	Liberal Democratic	
2009	Keiro Kitagami	Democratic	
2012	Hideyuki Tanaka	Liberal Democratic	
2014	Hideyuki Tanaka	Liberal Democratic	
2017	Hideyuki Tanaka	Liberal Democratic	
2021	Keiro Kitagami	Independent	
2024	Keiro Kitagami	Independent	
2026	Keiro Kitagami	LDP	

== Election results ==
2026
Party	Candidate	Votes	%	±%
Liberal Democratic	Keiro Kitagami (Incumbent)	142,149	73.7	
Communist	Koichi Yoshida	50,690	26.3	▲7.6
Majority		91,459	47.4	▲26.23
Registered electors		384,986		
Turnout		192,839	53.63	▲0.95
LDP hold				

2024
Party	Candidate	Votes	%	±%
Independent	Keiro Kitagami (Incumbent)	102,063	51.25	▲7.04
Liberal Democratic (endorsed by Komeito)	Hideyuki Tanaka	59,897	30.08	▼7.05
Communist	Koichi Yoshida	37,174	18.67	▲0.01
Majority		42,166	21.17	▲14.09
Registered electors		388,358		
Turnout		199,134	52.68	▼3.53
Independent hold				

2021
Party	Candidate	Votes	%	±%
Independent	Keiro Kitagami	96,172	44.21	New
Liberal Democratic (endorsed by Komeito)	Hideyuki Tanaka (Incumbent) (won PR seat)	80,775	37.13	
Communist	Koichi Yoshida	40,603	18.66	
Majority		15,397	7.08	
Registered electors		396,960		
Turnout			56.21	▲6.11
Independent gain from LDP				

2017
Party	Candidate	Votes	%	±%
Liberal Democratic (endorsed by Komeito)	Hideyuki Tanaka (Incumbent)	83,286	42.45	
Kibō no Tō	Keiro Kitagami (PR seat Incumbent)	71,068	36.23	New
Communist	Koichi Yoshida	38,219	19.48	
Happiness Realization	Yuki Enda	3,606	1.84	N/A
Majority		12,218	6.22	
Registered electors		402,079		
Turnout			50.10	
LDP hold				

2014
Party	Candidate	Votes	%	±%
Liberal Democratic (endorsed by Komeito)	Hideyuki Tanaka (Incumbent)	75,744	39.14	
Democratic	Keiro Kitagami	58,692	30.33	
Communist	Koichi Yoshida	32,895	17.00	
Innovation	Kunie Hatamoto	26,175	13.53	New
Majority		17,052	8.81	
Turnout				
LDP hold				

- Kitagami was additionally elected by Kinki proportional representation block following Kenta Izumi's resignation (running in a by-election).

2012
Party	Candidate	Votes	%	±%
Liberal Democratic (endorsed by Komeito)	Hideyuki Tanaka	73,162	33.14	
Democratic (endorsed by PNP)	Keiro Kitagami (Incumbent)	48,934	22.17	
Restoration	Kunie Hatamoto	36,587	16.57	New
Communist	Koichi Yoshida	25,276	11.45	
Your	Tetsuo Ishida	13,283	6.02	New
Independent	Yasuhiro Nakagawa	12,505	5.66	New
Tomorrow (endorsed by Daichi)	Juntaro Toyota	9,271	4.20	New
Happiness Realization	Mina Wada	1,745	0.79	
Majority		24,228	10.97	
Turnout				
LDP gain from Democratic				

2009
Party	Candidate	Votes	%	±%
Democratic (endorsed by PNP)	Keiro Kitagami (PR seat Incumbent)	109,865	41.24	
Independent	Hideo Tanaka	89,257	33.51	
Liberal Democratic (endorsed by Komeito)	Yasuhiro Nakagawa (Incumbent)	35,314	13.26	
Communist	Koichi Yoshida	30,410	11.42	
Happiness Realization	Hiroshi Deno	1,541	0.58	New
Majority		20,608	7.73	
Turnout				
Democratic gain from LDP				

2005
Party	Candidate	Votes	%	±%
Liberal Democratic	Yasuhiro Nakagawa	75,192	28.98	
Independent	Hideo Tanaka (Incumbent)	75,036	28.92	New
Democratic	Keiro Kitagami (won PR seat)	73,550	28.34	
Communist	Mariko Narumiya	35,705	13.76	
Majority		156	0.06	
Turnout				
LDP gain from Independent				

2003
Party	Candidate	Votes	%	±%
Liberal Democratic	Hideo Tanaka	108,209	49.67	
Democratic	Keiro Kitagami	72,665	33.35	
Communist	Mariko Narumiya	36,980	16.97	
Majority		35,544	16.32	
Turnout				
LDP hold				

2000
Party	Candidate	Votes	%	±%
Liberal Democratic	Hiromu Nonaka (Incumbent)	121,439	53.02	
Communist	Sirō Kamine	54,646	23.86	
Democratic	Kimiya Sagawa	34,522	15.07	New
Liberal	Juntaro Toyota	18,452	8.06	New
Majority		66,793	29.16	
Turnout				
LDP hold				

1996
Party	Candidate	Votes	%	±%
Liberal Democratic	Hiromu Nonaka	100,703	48.82	New
Communist	Sirō Kamine	60,918	29.53	New
New Frontier	Juntaro Toyota	44,637	21.64	New
Majority		39,785	19.29	
Turnout				
LDP win (new seat)				
