= Tani Sanzan =

Deafblind Japanese teacher

- たに さんざん
- Born: 1802; Yagi Village, Kyoto Prefecture, Japan
- Died: 11 December 1867 (aged 64–65)

Tani Sanzan (1802 – 11 December 1867) was a Japanese Confucian scholar and educator in the late Edo period. Deafened in his teenage years, Sanzan became blind in his later life and communicated with his students through tactile communication. In his writings he argued for the rejection of Western political and cultural influence.

== Life and work ==
Sanzan was born in Kyōwa 2 (1802) in a merchant house in Yagi Village. He was the third son of his father Shigeyuki and his mother Chiya. Sanzan lost his hearing around the age of 16.

He went to Kyoto to study in 1829. Sanzan studied with scholar Ikai Keisho (1761–1845) and was friends with intellectuals such as Rai San'yō and Yoshida Shōin. Sanzan opened a private school, Kojokan. Sanzan was appointed as a Confucian vassal by the lord of the Takatori domain. In 1847, Sanzan conducted a written conversation with scholar Setsusai Morita for three days and three nights.

He became a respected author of zuihitsu, a form of contemplative personal essay. His writings focused on promoting respect for the emperor and rejection of Western foreigners.

Sanzan lost his eyesight towards the end of his life, though he continued to teach by having students write characters on his palm. He died on 11 December 1867.
