= Yamaga Station =

Railway station in Ayabe, Kyoto Prefecture, Japan

Yamaga Station 山家駅
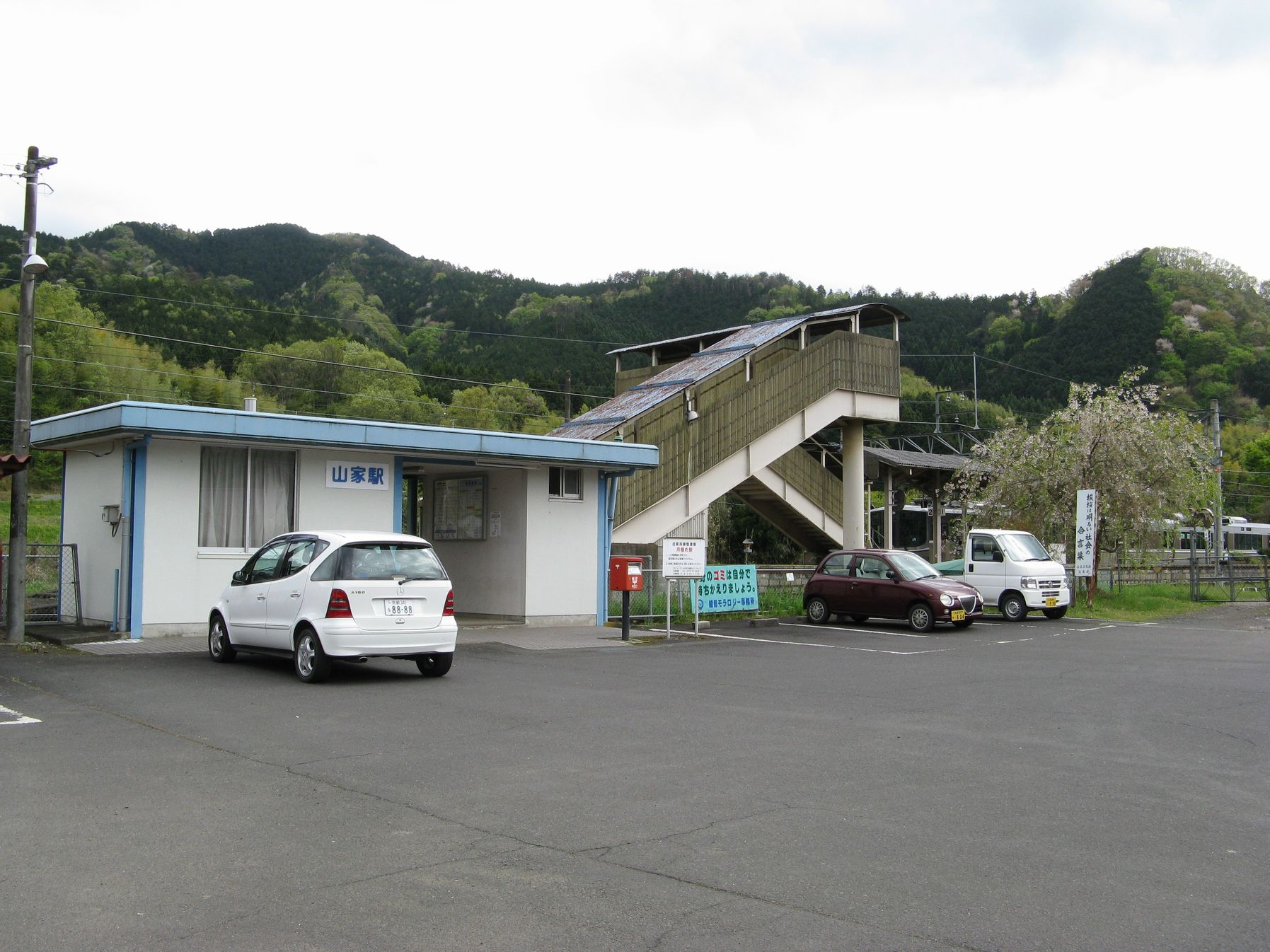
- Yamaga Station in 2009

General information
- Location: Kitora Kanbaracho, Ayabe-shi, Kyoto-fu 629-1271; Japan
- Coordinates: 35.2937°N 135.3188°E
- Owner: West Japan Railway Company
- Operator: West Japan Railway Company
- Line: San'in Main Line
- Distance: 69.0 km (42.9 miles) from Kyoto
- Platforms: 1 island platform
- Connections: Bus stop

Construction
- Structure type: Ground level

Other information
- Status: Unstaffed
- Website: Official website

History
- Opened: 25 August 1910

Passengers
- FY 2023: 16 daily

Services
Preceding station	JR West	Following station
Ayabe towards Kinosaki-Onsen	San'in Line	Tachiki towards Kyoto
Location
- Location within Kyoto Prefecture Location within Japan

Yamaga Station (山家駅, Yamaga-eki) is a passenger railway station located in the city of Ayabe, Kyoto Prefecture, Japan, operated by West Japan Railway Company (JR West).

== Lines ==
Yamaga Station is served by the San'in Main Line, and is located 69.0 kilometers from the terminus of the line at Kyoto.

== Station layout ==
The station consists of one ground-level island platforms connected to the station building by a footbridge. The station is unattended.

=== Platforms ===
1	■ San'in Main Line	for Sonobe and Kyoto
2	■ San'in Main Line	for Ayabe and Fukuchiyama

== Adjacent stations ==
«	Service	»
West Japan Railway Company (JR West) Sanin Main Line
Tachiki	Local (including Sagano Line rapid services)	Ayabe
Rapid Service (Sonobe—Fukuchiyama): Does not stop at this station

== History ==
Yamaga Station opened on August 25, 1910. With the privatization of the Japan National Railways (JNR) on April 1, 1987, the station came under the aegis of the West Japan Railway Company.

== Passenger statistics ==
In fiscal 2018, the station was used by an average of 46 passengers daily.

== Surrounding area ==
- Shofuku-ji Garden (National Place of Scenic Beauty)
- Yura River
- Japan National Route 27

== See also ==
- List of railway stations in Japan
