= Yasuhiro Nakagawa =

Japanese politician

- 中川 泰宏

Member of the House of Representatives
- In office 11 September 2005 – 21 July 2009
- Preceded by: Hideo Tanaka
- Succeeded by: Keiro Kitagami
- Constituency: Kyoto 4th

Mayor of Yagi
- In office 1992–2002
- Preceded by: Ken Hosomi
- Succeeded by: Yoshiharu Kishigami

Personal details
- Born: 19 September 1951 (age 74) Yagi, Kyoto, Japan
- Party: Liberal Democratic

Yasuhiro Nakagawa (中川 泰宏, Nakagawa Yasuhiro; born 19 September 1951) is a former Japanese politician who served in the House of Representatives in the Diet (national legislature) as a member of the Liberal Democratic Party. A native of Yagi, Kyoto and high school graduate he was elected to the Diet for the first time in 2005 after serving as mayor of his hometown Yagi from 1992 to 2002.
