= Tambaguri =

Tambaguri (or Tamba chestnut, scientific name: Castanea crenata f. gigantea) is a general term for Japanese chestnuts grown mainly in the Tanba and Sasayama regions of Japan. In general, it is known for its fine Japanese chestnuts with large fruits also called Ouguri. The representative cultivars are Ginyose and Tsukuba, which used to be called 'Ginyu' and 'Ginzen', but are now unified as 'Ginyose'.

== Overview ==
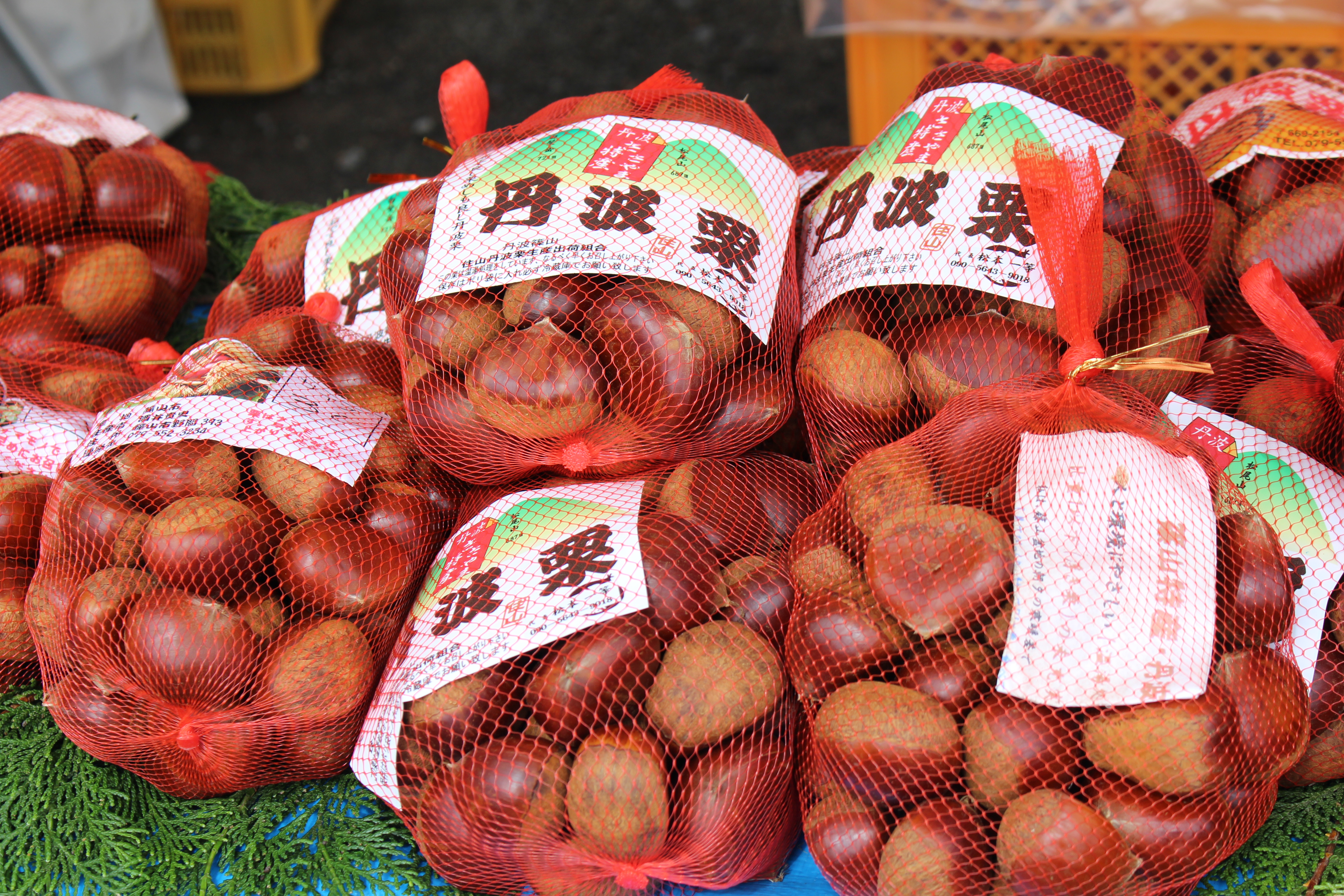
Tamba chestnuts sold at the Tamba Sasayama Festival

There are various theories about the history of Ginyose, but it is believed that in 1753 during the Edo period, Kanuemon Oku brought chestnut seeds from present-day Hiroshima Prefecture to Kura-gaki Village in Settsu Province (current-day Kasaoka City, Okayama Prefecture) Subsequently, it became widely cultivated in the Tamba region through graft propagation.

As of 2018, producer organizations, Kyoto Prefecture, and Hyogo Prefecture define Tamba chestnut as an ancient regional brand crop, likely one of Japan's oldest, with a long history of large-sized chestnut cultivation in the Tamba region, taking advantage of its unique climate. In other words, based on the long history of cultivation of large chestnuts in the Tanba region and the cultivation climate with temperature differences, it is probably the oldest regional brand crop name in Japan, which has existed since at least the Heian period, and in some cases even earlier. In the Edo period, saplings were propagated from the Tamba region to various places.

== History ==
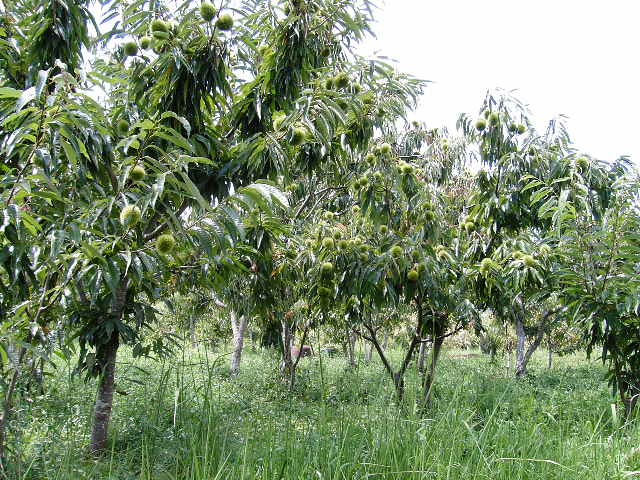
Tamba chestnuts grown in Kyotanba, Kyoto Prefecture

Tamba chestnuts have a long history, and are said to have been cultivated by Empress Jitō, and have been known since ancient times as their name appears in Kojiki, Man'yōshū, and Nihon Shoki. The Engishiki, which was created in the middle of the Heian period, introduces the name of chestnuts as a specialty product of Tanba Province, and it is believed that chestnuts were cultivated rather than naturally grown.

Historically, Tamba chestnuts were mainly propagated from seedlings, rather than fixed varieties through grafting, although this practice has changed in more recent times. Additionally, during the Meiji and Taisho periods, many excellent local varieties, including Choukouji, Tetouchi, Shougatsu, Keinaga, Jorou, Kanotsume, and Yagi, coexisted alongside Gin-yose. However, due to the spread of pests, especially the chestnut gall wasp, and global warming, most of these indigenous varieties, except for Gin-yose and a few others, were eliminated and have disappeared. Nearly all the old Tamba chestnut trees that were confirmed in the Showa period are now almost entirely lost. In comparison to the survival of old trees in the cooler climate of Tohoku and other regions, this suggests that global warming poses significant challenges to the survival of chestnut trees in the Tamba region.

As of now, Gin-yose remains the only nearly exclusive variety grown among modern Tamba chestnut cultivations. Although the name "Gin-yose" is sometimes used to refer to Tamba chestnut, it is essential to understand that Tamba chestnut primarily denotes the geographical origin of the product. As of 2022, the JA Tamba Sasayama recommends planting both Gin-yose and Tsukuba varieties.

In recent years, Tamba chestnut production in the Tamba region has slightly recovered due to encouragement by public institutions and producer organizations for new planting and the introduction of chestnut varieties resistant to pests. The practice of converting fallow fields to chestnut cultivation, which was once encouraged, is no longer recommended due to frequent occurrences of death of chestnut trees when grown in former paddy fields. However, the maintenance of chestnut trees in Kinki and western Japan has become increasingly challenging due to global warming, increased rainfall during the rainy season, and the rise in pest and disease occurrences, emphasizing the urgent need for disease-resistant rootstock development and advancements in cultivation techniques

The "Hirako no Tamba-guri" in Nishi-shirocho, Shobara City, Hiroshima Prefecture, is designated as a natural monument of Hiroshima Prefecture.
