= Shimoyama Station (Kyoto) =

Railway station in Kyōtamba, Kyoto Prefecture, Japan

Shimoyama Station 下山駅
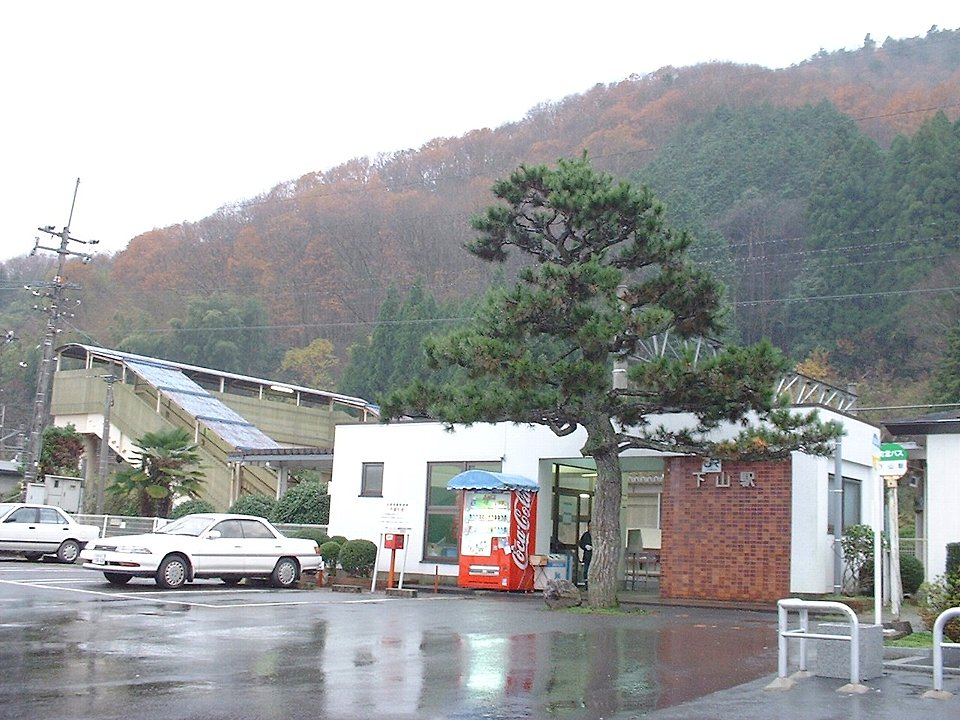
- Shimoyama Station, July 2006

General information
- Location: Shimoyama, Kyōtamba-cho, Funai-gun, Kyoto-fu 622-0201; Japan
- Coordinates: 35°12′44″N 135°25′22″E
- Owner: West Japan Railway Company
- Operator: West Japan Railway Company
- Line: San'in Main Line
- Distance: 51.9 km (32.2 miles) from Kyoto
- Platforms: 2 side platforms
- Tracks: 2
- Connections: Bus stop

Construction
- Structure type: Ground level

Other information
- Status: Unstaffed
- Website: Official website

History
- Opened: 10 October 1925

Passengers
- FY 2023: 138 daily

Services
Preceding station	JR West	Following station
Wachi towards Kinosaki-Onsen	San'in Line Local Rapid	Goma towards Kyoto
Location
- Location within Kyoto Prefecture Location within Japan

Shimoyama Station (下山駅, Shimoyama-eki) is a passenger railway station located in the town of Kyōtamba, Funai District, Kyoto Prefecture, Japan, operated by West Japan Railway Company (JR West).

== Lines ==
Shimoyama Station is served by the San'in Main Line, and is located 51.9 kilometers from the terminus of the line at Kyoto.

== Station layout ==
The station consists of two opposed ground-level side platforms connected to the station building by a footbridge. The station is unattended.

=== Platforms ===
1	■ San'in Main Line	for Sonobe and Kyoto
2	■ San'in Main Line	for Ayabe and Fukuchiyama

== History ==
Shimoyama Station opened on October 10, 1925. With the privatization of the Japan National Railways (JNR) on April 1, 1987, the station came under the aegis of the West Japan Railway Company.

== Passenger statistics ==
In fiscal 2016, the station was used by an average of 206 passengers daily.

== Surrounding area ==
- Kyotanba Town Shimoyama Elementary School
- Kyoto Prefectural Tamba Nature Sports Park

== See also ==
- List of railway stations in Japan
