= Wachi, Kyoto =

Dissolved municipality in Kyoto prefecture, Japan

Wachi (和知町, Wachi-chō) was a town located in Funai District, Kyoto Prefecture, Japan.

As of 2003, the town had an estimated population of 3,829 and a density of 32.11 persons per km^{2}. The total area was 119.25 km^{2}.

On October 11, 2005, Wachi, along with the towns of Tamba and Mizuho (all from Funai District), was merged to create the town of Kyōtamba.

== Schools ==
Wachi has one elementary school (Wachi Elementary) and one middle school (Wachi Middle School). As of 2010, Wachi Middle School had 97 students.

== Transportation ==
Wachi has three train stations, Wachi Station, Aseri Station, and Tachiki Station. Trains pass through Wachi about once every hour.
