= Ōe, Kyoto =

Coordinates: 35°18′14.1″N 135°13′33.3″E

Ōe (大江町, Ōe-chō) was a town located in Kasa District, Kyoto Prefecture, Japan.

As of 2003, the town had an estimated population of 5,571 and a density of 57.55 persons per km². The total area was 96.81 km².

On January 1, 2006, Ōe, along with the towns of Miwa and Yakuno (both from Amata District), was merged into the expanded city of Fukuchiyama.

== See also ==
- List of mergers in Kyoto Prefecture
