= Wachi Station =

Railway station in Kyōtamba, Kyoto Prefecture, Japan

Wachi Station 和知駅
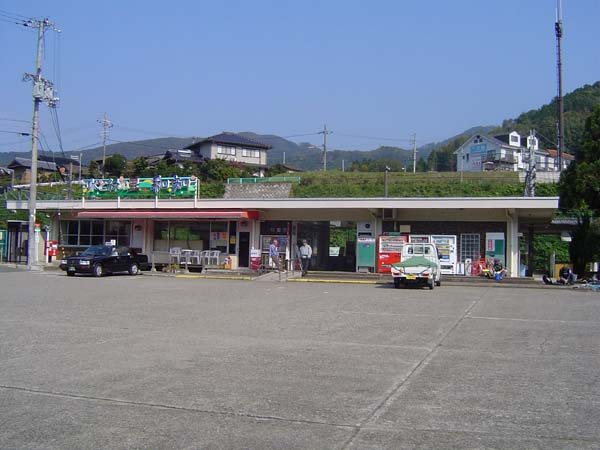
- Wachi Station, November 2006

General information
- Location: Kishimoto Honjo, Kyōtamba-cho, Funai-gun, Kyoto-fu 629-1121; Japan
- Coordinates: 35.2609°N 135.3988°E
- Owner: West Japan Railway Company
- Operator: West Japan Railway Company
- Line: San'in Main Line
- Distance: 58.6 km (36.4 miles) from Kyoto
- Platforms: 1 side + 1 island platform
- Tracks: 3
- Connections: Bus stop

Other information
- Status: Staffed
- Website: Official website

History
- Opened: 25 August 1910

Passengers
- FY 2023: 176 daily

Services
Preceding station	JR West	Following station
Aseri towards Kinosaki-Onsen	San'in Line Local Rapid	Shimoyama towards Kyoto
Location
- Location within Kyoto Prefecture Location within Japan

Wachi Station (和知駅, Wachi-eki) is a passenger railway station located in the town of Kyōtamba, Funai District, Kyoto Prefecture, Japan, operated by West Japan Railway Company (JR West).

== Lines ==
Wachi Station is served by the San'in Main Line, and is located 58.6 kilometers from the terminus of the line at Kyoto.

== Station layout ==
The station consists of one ground-level side platform and one ground-level island platform connected to the station building by a footbridge. The station is staffed.

=== Platforms ===
1	■ San'in Main Line	for Ayabe and Fukuchiyama
2, 3	■ San'in Main Line	for Sonobe and Kyoto

== History ==
Wachi Station opened on August 25, 1910. With the privatization of the Japan National Railways (JNR) on April 1, 1987, the station came under the aegis of the West Japan Railway Company.

== Passenger statistics ==
In fiscal 2016, the station was used by an average of 338 passengers daily.

== Surrounding area ==
- Kyotamba Town Hall Wachi Branch (formerly Wachi Town Hall)
- Kyotanba Town Wachi Elementary School
- Kyoto Prefectural College of Forestry
- Yura River
- Japan National Route 27

== See also ==
- List of railway stations in Japan
