= Keihoku, Kyoto =

Keihoku 京北町
- Town
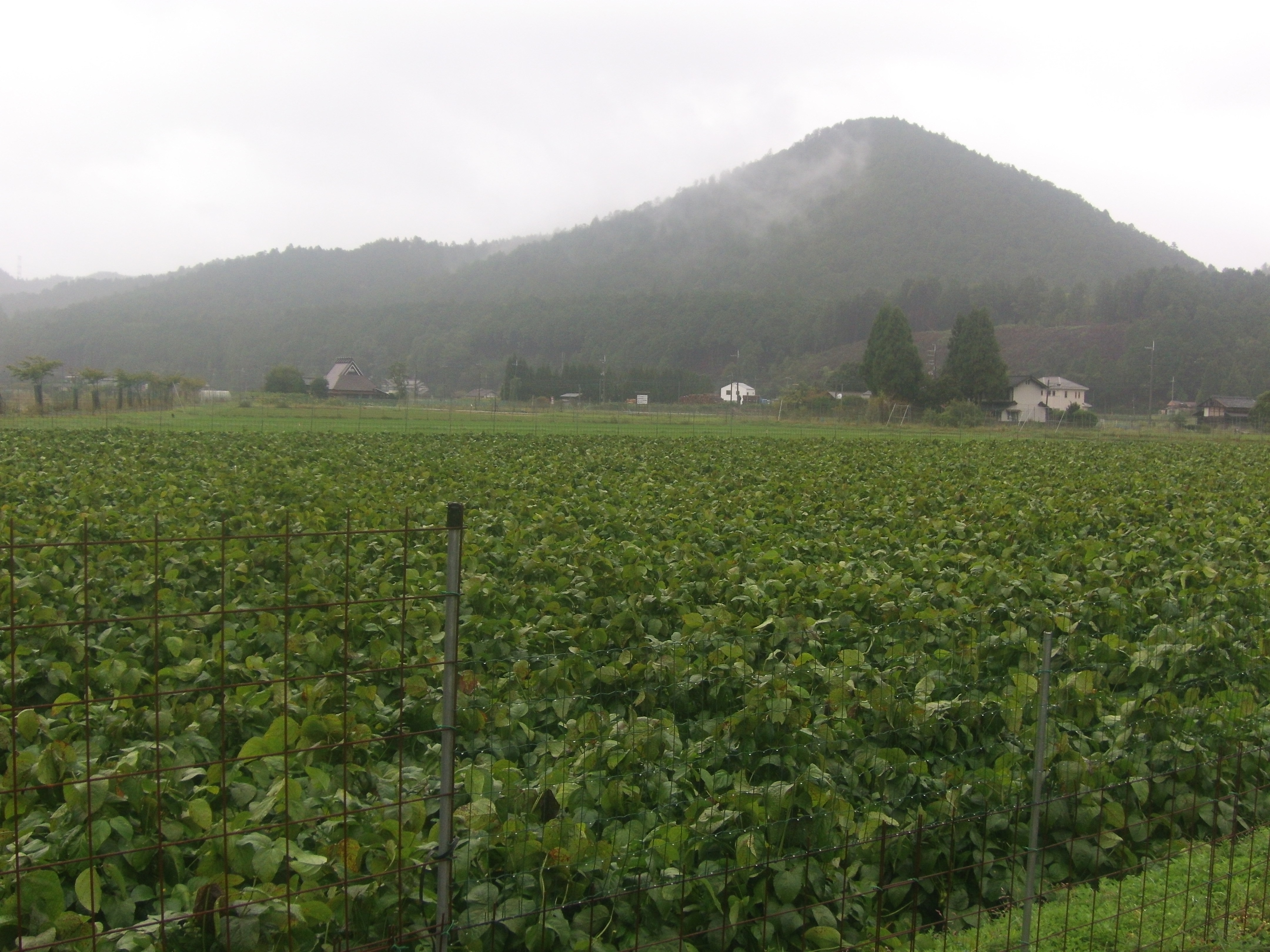
- Farmland in Keihoku

- Flag Emblem

- Coordinates: 35.217°N 135.683°E
- Country: Japan
- Region: Kansai
- Prefecture: Kyoto Prefecture
- District: Kitakuwata District

Area
  - Total: 217.68 km^{2} (84.05 sq mi)

Population (March 31, 2004)
  - Total: 6,749
- Time zone: UTC+9 (Japan Standard Time)
- Tree: Japanese cedar
- Merged with: Ukyo Ward, Kyoto,
- Phone number: 0771-52-0300
- Address: Kamiterada-1-1 Keihokushuzancho, Ukyo Ward, Kyoto, 601-0251
- Website: kyoto-keihoku.jp kyoto-keihoku.jp/en/

Keihoku (京北町, Keihoku-chō) was a town located in Kitakuwada District, Kyoto Prefecture, Japan. The town was the second largest among the towns and villages in the Kyoto Prefecture. The town was entirely on the Tamba plateau. The town, being surrounded by mountains, had an inland climate with cool summers, cold winters, and a huge amount of precipitation.

As 90% of the area was covered in forest, forestry has been a key industry in Keihoku. The construction of Heian-kyō, capital of Imperial Japan from 794 to 1868, relied hugely on the timber imports from Keihoku. Local villagers and lumberjacks used to deliver the timber to Kyoto through Katsura River during the ancient times.

As of 2003, the town had an estimated population of 6,362 and a density of 29.23 persons per km^{2}. The total area was 217.68 km^{2}. It was said that more artisans are moving to Keihoku in pursue of better quality of life.

On April 1, 2005, Keihoku was merged into the expanded city of Kyoto, specifically at Ukyo Ward, and thus is no longer an independent municipality.

== Tourism and transportation ==
ROOTS Journey, a Keihoku-based company is established to promote sustainable tourism within the region. Other than its rich historic background and forestry industry, the region is notable for its "satoyama" lifestyle, traditional thatched roof houses and natural landscapes.

=== Public transportation ===
- West JR Bus Ser Kyotsuru Line (Kyoto Station - Nijo Station -Kaohsiung-Tsumenoo- Zhouyama)
- Miyama-Keihoku Bus
- Local Furusato bus

=== National highways ===
- Japan National Route 162 (Zhoushan Highway)
- Japan National Route 477

Take JR bus of Takao/Keihoku Line from Kyoto station (terminal No.3) via Omiya, Nijo and Enmachi station. Shuzan terminal is a final stop and it takes around 1 hour 30 mins from Kyoto station. Transport fare costs 1200 yen, or you can use Japan Rail Pass.

=== Attractions ===
- Joshokoji Temple
- Shuzan Castle ruins
- Fukutokuji Temple
- Yamakuni Shrine
- Shuzan Abandoned Temple
