= Kasa District, Kyoto =

Former district in Kyōto prefecture, Japan

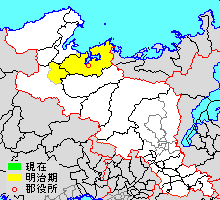
Location of Kasa in Kyoto prefecture

Kasa (加佐郡, Kasa-gun) is a former district located in Kyoto Prefecture, Japan. It was dissolved on January 1, 2006 when its last remaining municipality, the town of Ōe, Kyoto was merged with the city of Fukuchiyama

== Towns and Villages ==
Kasa district formerly encompassed:

- Maizuru (entire city)
- Miyazu (Yura, Ishiura neighborhoods)
- Fukuchiyama, Kyoto (Ōe neighborhood)

== History ==
Kasa District was an ancient district of Tanba Province, and was one of the five districts for Tanba which were separated into Tango Province in 713.The provincial capital and kokubun-ji of the province were located in Kasa district. At the end of the Edo Period, the district was organized into one town (Maizuru) and 134 villages, mostly under the control of Tango-Tanabe Domain. Modern Kasa District was established on April 10, 1879 within Kyoto Prefecture. With the establishment of the modern municipalities system on April 1, 1889, it was organized into one town (Maizuru) and 24 villages.
