= Tanba, Kyoto =

Dissolved municipality in Kyoto prefecture, Japan

Tanba (丹波町, Tanba-chō) was a town located in Funai District, Kyoto Prefecture, Japan.

As of 2003, the town had an estimated population of 8,516 and a density of 114.94 persons per km^{2}. The total area was 74.09 km^{2}.

On October 11, 2005, Tanba, along with the towns of Mizuho and Wachi (all from Funai District), was merged to create the town of Kyōtamba.
