= Mizuho, Kyoto =

Dissolved municipality in Kyoto prefecture, Japan

Mizuho (瑞穂町, Mizuho-chō) was a town located in Funai District, Kyoto Prefecture, Japan.

As of 2003, the town had an estimated population of 4,987 and a density of 45.45 persons per km^{2}. The total area was 109.73 km^{2}.

On October 11, 2005, Mizuho, along with the towns of Tanba and Wachi (all from Funai District), was merged to create the town of Kyōtamba.

The Tamba region, in which Mizuho (now Kyōtamba) is located, is known for its kuri (chestnuts), matsutake mushrooms, and kuromame (black beans).

Mizuho is home to Kyoto prefecture's largest limestone cave and Greenland Mizuho, a sports park and camping area. Every year the town hosts various events, including a summer fireworks show and festival on August 17, the Kyōtamba Road Race on November 3, a Field Hockey Festival, and neighborhood festivals centering on local shrines, the most famous of which is held in the Shitsumi area.
