= Hiyoshi Dam =

Dam in Nantan, Kyoto Prefecture, Japan

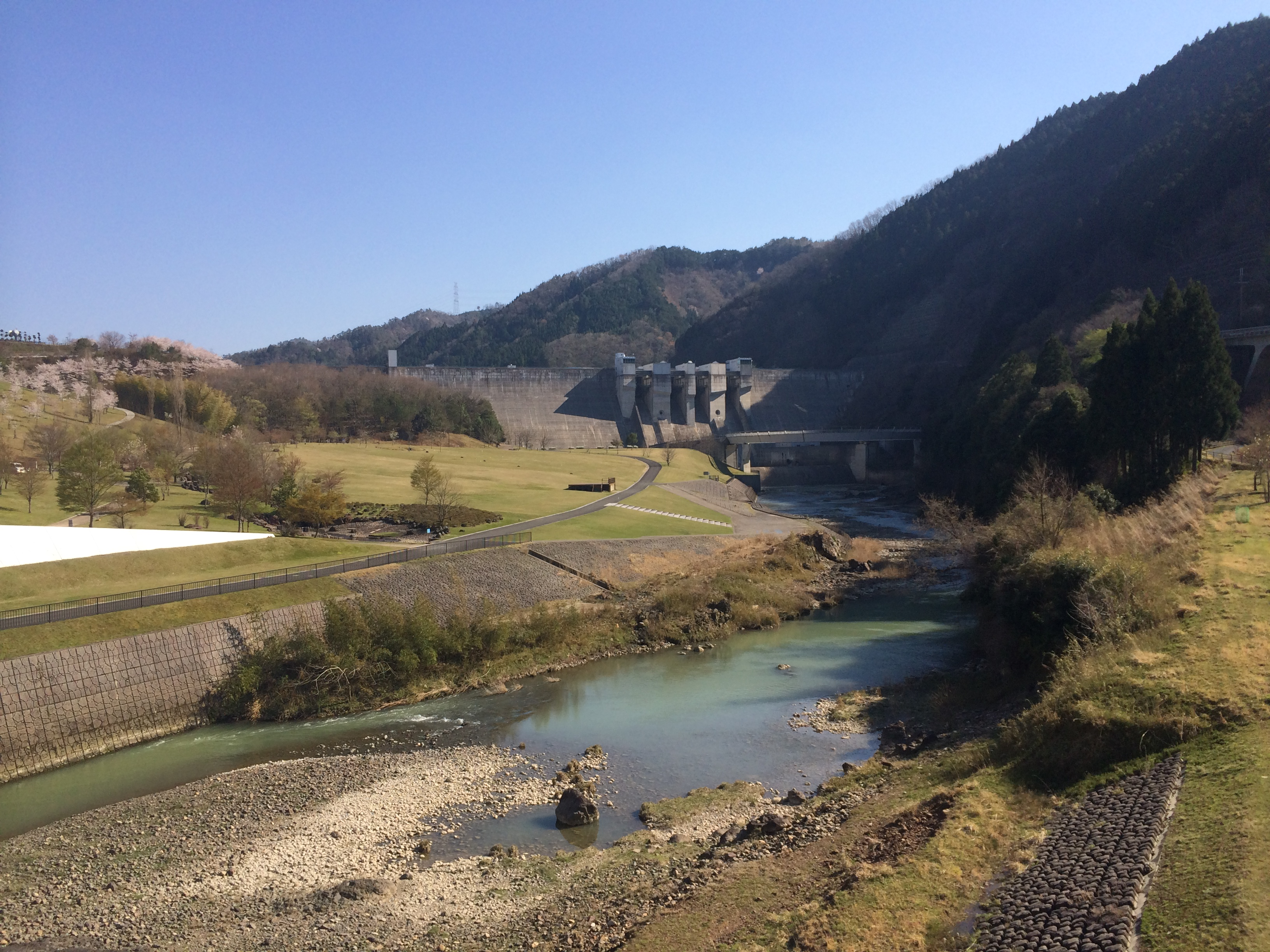

- Location within Japan
- Location: Nantan, Kyoto Prefecture, Japan
- Coordinates: 35°08′51″N 135°31′01″E
- Construction began: 1992
- Opening date: 1996

Dam and spillways
- Type of dam: Concrete gravity
- Impounds: Katsura River
- Height: 67.4 m (221 ft)
- Length: 438 m (1,437 ft)
- Dam volume: 670,000 m^{3}

Reservoir
- Total capacity: 66,000,000 m^{3}
- Catchment area: 290 km^{2}
- Surface area: 2.74 km^{2}

Power Station
- Installed capacity: 850 kW

Hiyoshi Dam (日吉ダム) is a concrete gravity dam in Nantan, Kyoto Prefecture, Japan. Constructed from 1992 to 1996, the dam has a height of 67.4 m and a length of 438 m. It creates the artificial lake Amawaka (天若湖, Amawaka-ko), with an area of 2.74 km^{2}. Initial planning for its construction started in 1961, as a measure to protect downstream area from frequent floods by the Katsura river.

Hiyoshi Dam is used for three main purposes: flood control, river maintenance and water supply.

The dam temporarily stores surges in river water during floods, regulating the flow and avoiding damage to downstream areas. The dam is designed for 100-year floods (floods estimated to occur once every 100 years). The maximum release of water during flood control operations in normal situations is 150 m^{3} per second. However, if not enough, the dam is able to discharge more water when the level in the reservoir surpass the surcharge water level. One such situations occurred in September 2013, when heavy rain from Typhoon 18 forced a maximum outflow of 504 m^{3} per second. In case of emergency, with floods bigger than the estimated 100-year flood for which the dam is designed, the emergency spillways can discharge up to 3,100 m^{3} per second, ensuring the safety of the structure. These spillways have been used only during trials.

The dam also helps to ensure that the river water flow downstream is above a certain minimum level during drought periods. Hiyoshi Dam also supplies 3.7 m^{3} per second of additional water supply, sufficient for about 1 million people, supplying domestic water to cities in Kyoto Prefecture, Osaka Prefecture and Hyogo Prefecture.

Hiyoshi Dam includes a small hydroelectric power generator with a capacity of 850 kW. The energy is used to power the dam facilities, with the excess generation sold to the grid.

188 houses were submerged.

== Gallery ==
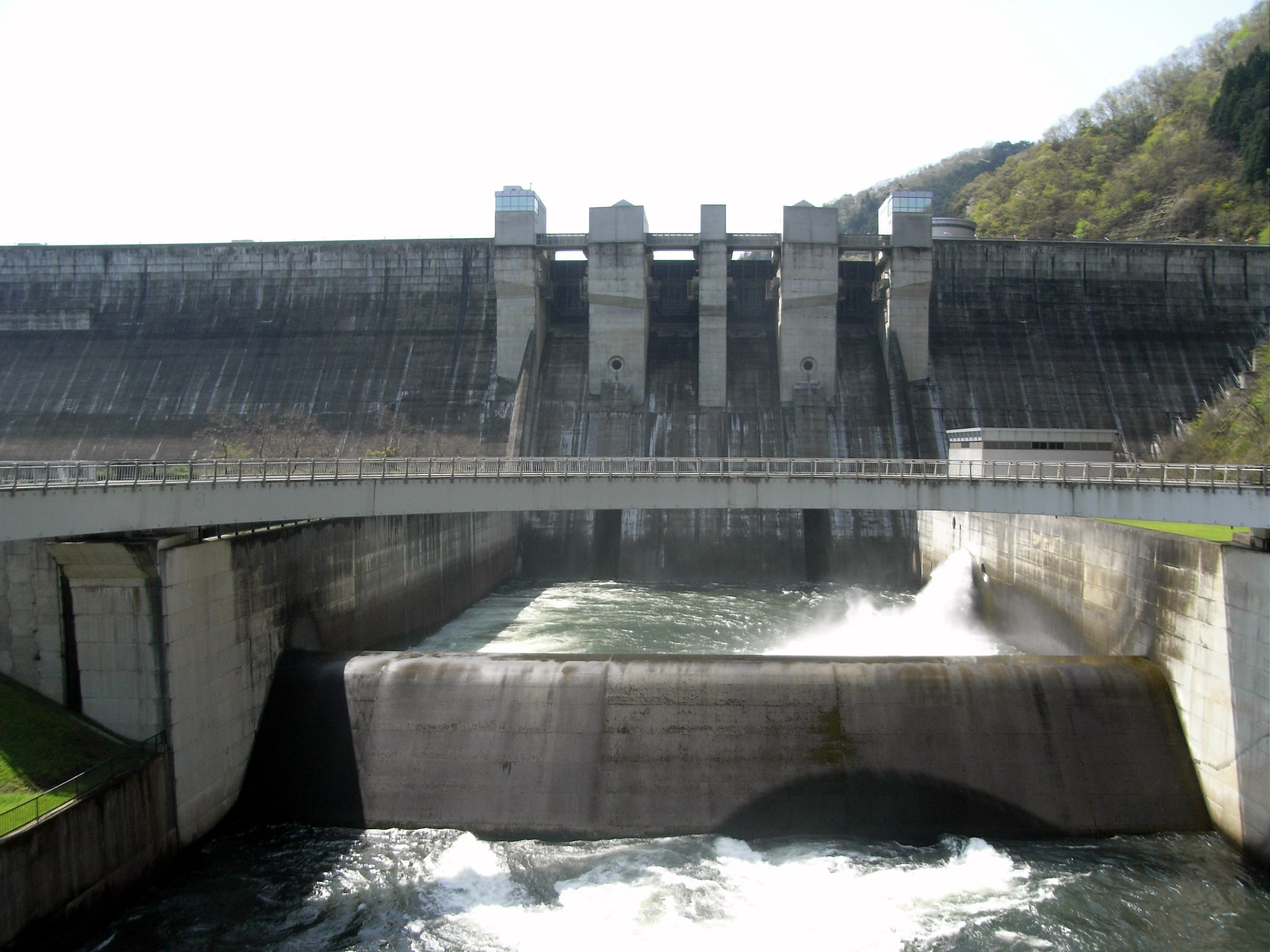
Emergency spillways

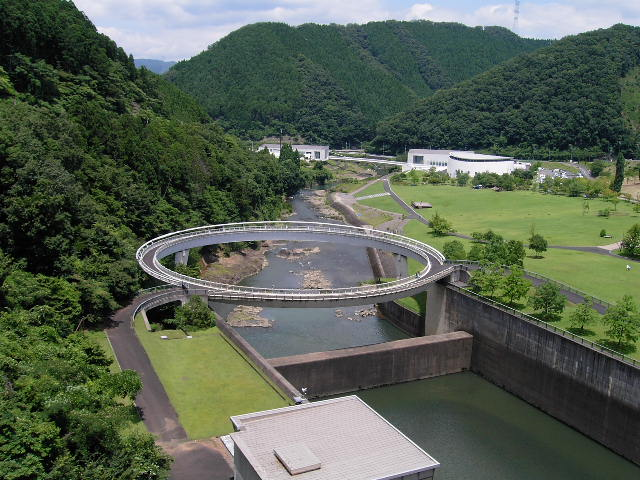
The park downstream of the dam

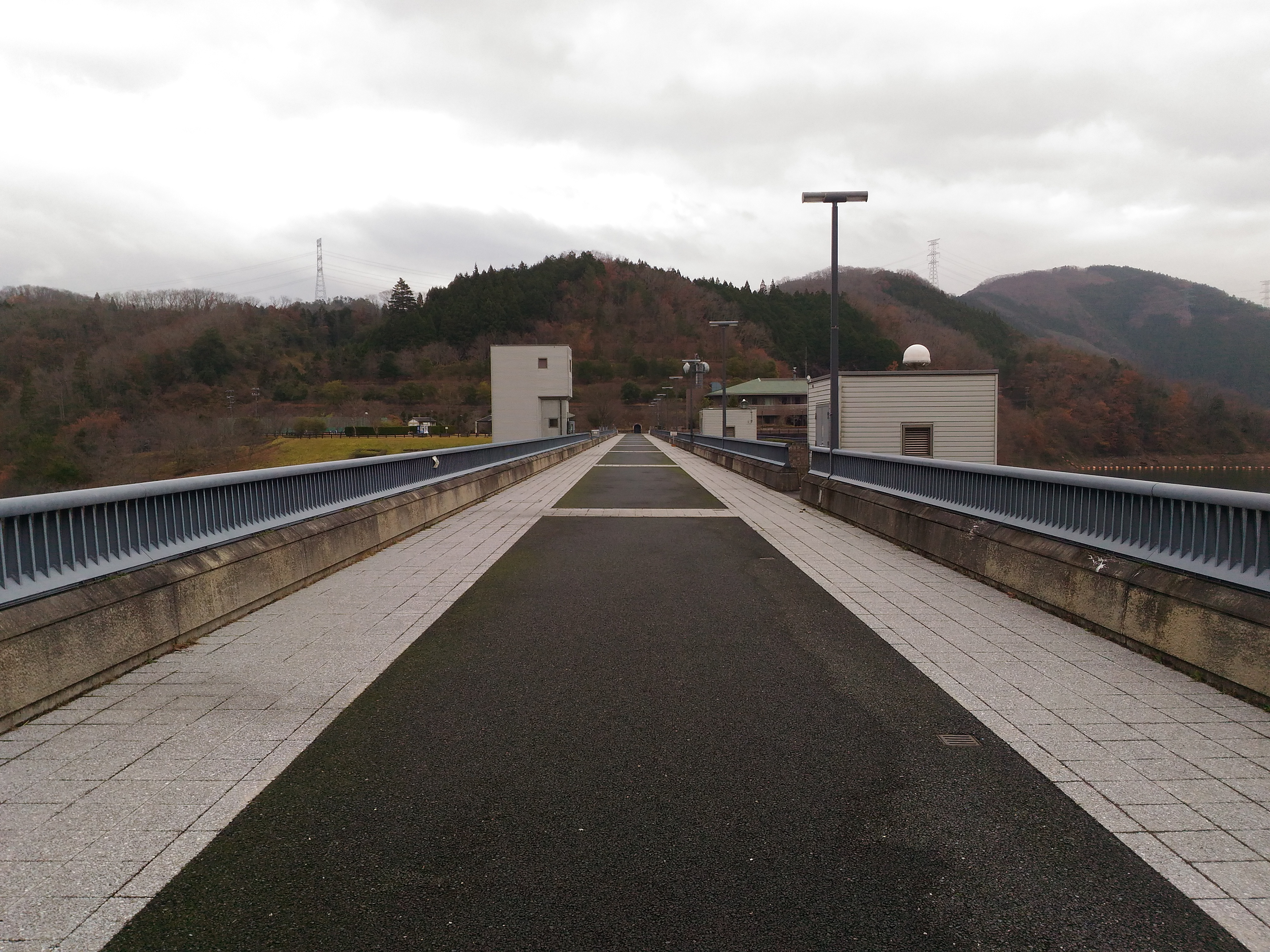
On the top of the dam

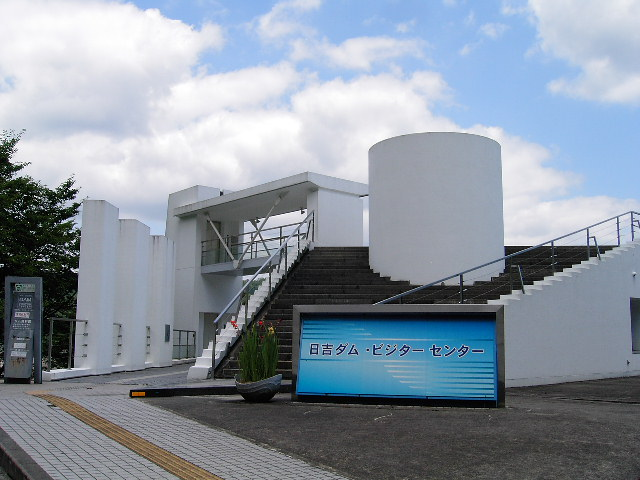
Hiyoshi Dam visitor center

== See also ==
- List of dams and reservoirs in Japan
