= Kyōtamba =

Kyōtamba 京丹波町
- Town
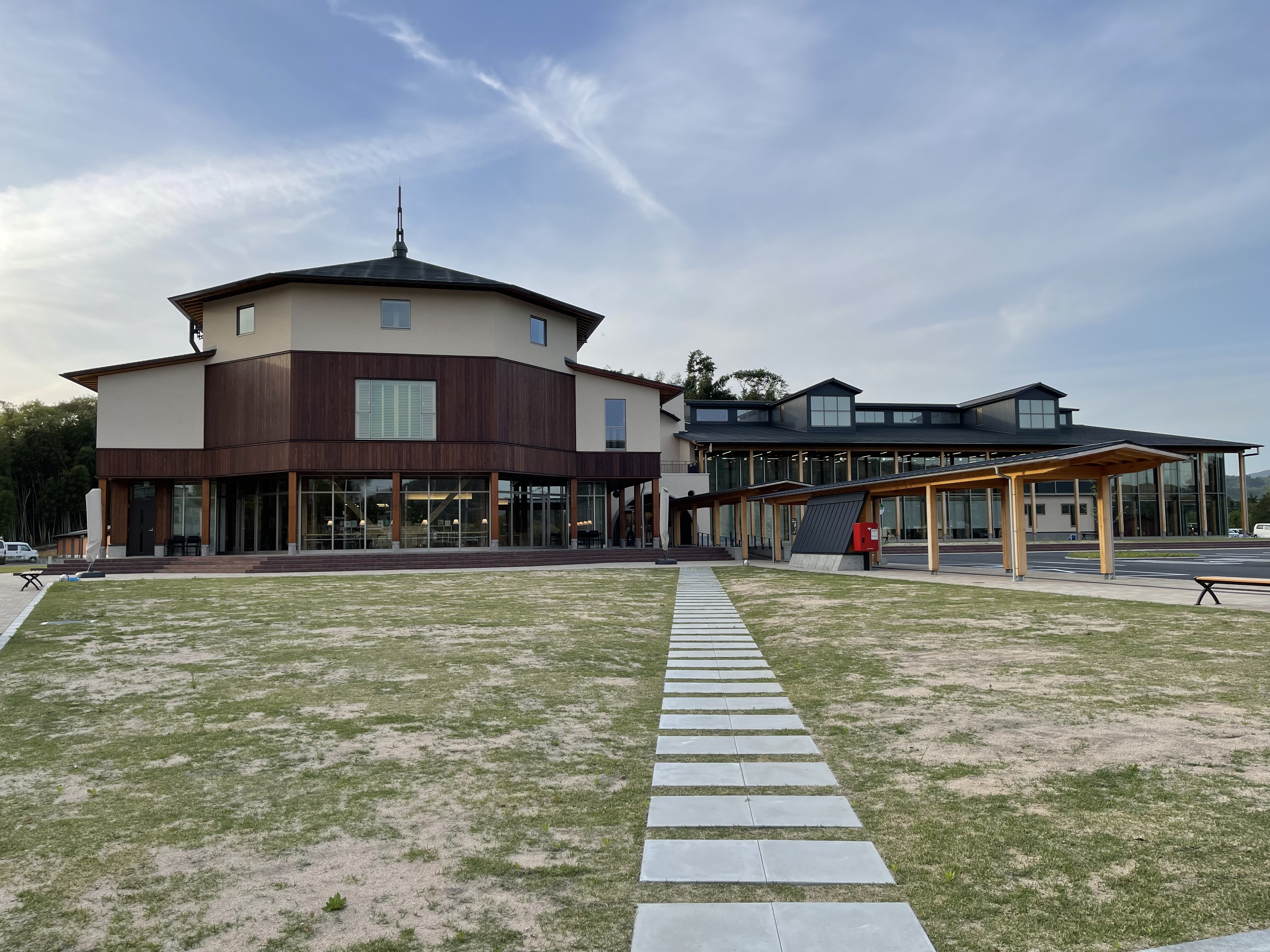
- Kyōtamba Town Hall

- Flag Emblem

- Location of Kyōtamba in Kyoto Prefecture

- Location in Japan
- Coordinates: 35°10′N 135°25′E
- Country: Japan
- Region: Kansai
- Prefecture: Kyoto
- District: Funai

Area
  - Total: 303.09 km^{2} (117.02 sq mi)

Population (May 1, 2022)
  - Total: 13,195
  - Density: 43.535/km^{2} (112.75/sq mi)
- Time zone: UTC+09:00 (JST)
- City hall address: 487-1, Gamōno, Gamō, Kyōtamba-cho, Kyoto-fu 622-0292
- Website: Official website
- Symbols
- Bird: Japanese bush warbler
- Flower: Rhododendron
- Tree: Ginkgo biloba

Kyōtamba (京丹波町, Kyōtanba-chō) is a town located in Funai District, Kyoto Prefecture, Japan. As of 1 May 2022, the town had an estimated population of 13,195 in 6188 households and a population density of 44 persons per km^{2}. The total area of the town is 303.09 square kilometres (117.02 sq mi). Its name comes from the first syllable of Kyōto and the former town of Tamba, a namesake of the historic Tanba Province.

== Geography ==
Kyōtamba is located between the Fukuchiyama basin and the Kameoka basins in the central part of the Tamba region in central Kyoto Prefecture. the southern part of the town is the watershed between the Yodo River system and the Yura River systems.

=== Neighbouring municipalities ===
Hyōgo Prefecture

- Sasayama

Kyoto Prefecture

- Ayabe
- Fukuchiyama
- Nantan

=== Climate ===
Kyōtamba has a humid subtropical climate (Köppen Cfa) characterized by warm summers and cool winters with light to no snowfall. The average annual temperature in Kyōtamba is 13.7 °C. The average annual rainfall is 1771 mm with September as the wettest month. The temperatures are highest on average in August, at around 25.5 °C, and lowest in January, at around 2.4 °C.

== Demographics ==
Per Japanese census data, the population of Kyōtamba peaked around 1950 and has declined by roughly half in the decades since.

Historical population
Year	Pop.	±%
1920	22,723	—
1930	21,155	−6.9%
1940	20,182	−4.6%
1950	25,648	+27.1%
1960	23,929	−6.7%
1970	20,061	−16.2%
1980	19,677	−1.9%
1990	18,696	−5.0%
2000	17,292	−7.5%
2010	15,732	−9.0%
2020	12,907	−18.0%

== History ==
The area of the modern town of Kyōtamba was within ancient Tanba Province. In the Edo Period, most of the area was tenryō territory controlled directly by the Tokugawa shogunate. The village of Shuchi was established with the creation of the modern municipalities system on April 1, 1889. It was elevated to town status on July 19, 1901, and changed its name to Tanba on April 1, 1955. The town of Kyōtamba was founded on October 11, 2005, by the merger of the former towns of Tanba, Mizuho and Wachi, all from Funai District.

== Government ==
Kyōtamba has a mayor-council form of government with a directly elected mayor and a unicameral town council of 13 members. Kyōtamba, together with the city of Nantan contributes one member to the Kyoto Prefectural Assembly. In terms of national politics, the town is part of Kyoto4th district of the lower house of the Diet of Japan.

== Economy ==
Kyōtamba has an economy based on agriculture and forestry. The main products include grapes, matsutake mushrooms, black soybeans, chestnuts, Tamba beef, Kyōtamba pork and Tanba wine.

== Education ==
Kyōtamba has five public elementary schools and three public middle schools operated by the town government and one public high school operated by the Kyoto Prefectural Department of Education. The prefecture also operates one forestry training school,

== Transportation ==
=== Railway ===
JR West – San'in Main Line

- Shimoyama - Wachi - Aseri - Tachiki

=== Highway ===
- Kyoto Jūkan Expressway
- National Route 9
- National Route 27
- National Route 173
- National Route 478

== Sister cities ==
- City of Hawkesbury, Australia, since 1988

== Noted people from Kyōtamba ==
- Kenji Hatanaka, Imperial Japanese Army officer
- Atsushi Sakahara, movie director and producer
