= Hiyoshi Station =

Hiyoshi Station (日吉駅) may refer to:

- Hiyoshi Station (Kyoto) in Nantan, Kyoto Prefecture, Japan, connected with the JR San'in Main Line
- Hiyoshi Station (Kanagawa) in Kōhoku-ku, Yokohama, Japan, connected with Tōyoko line, Meguro line, Tōkyū Shin-yokohama line and Yokohama Municipal Subway Green line
