= Keiro Kitagami =

Japanese politician (born 1967)

- 北神 圭朗
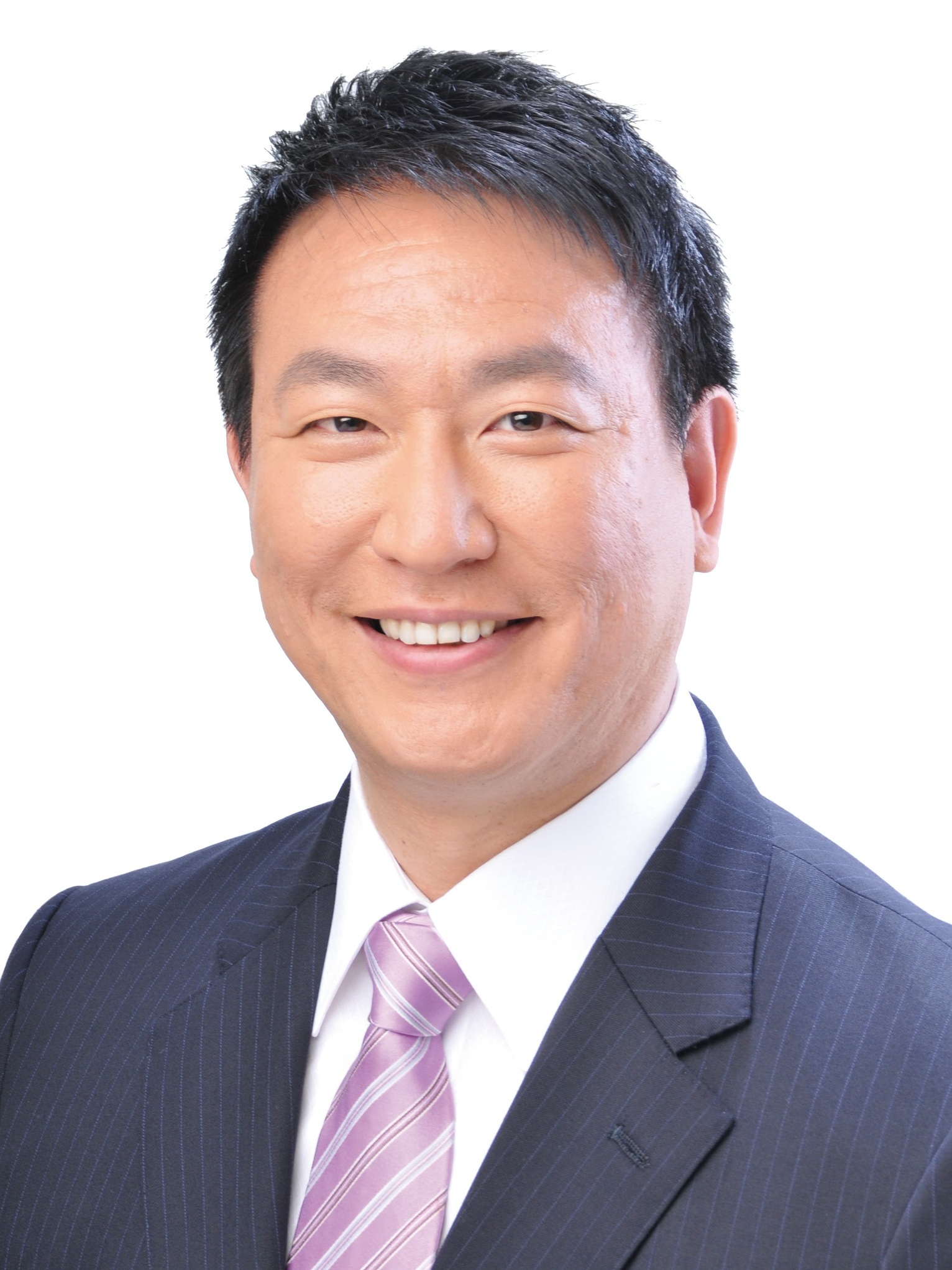
- Official portrait, 2012

Member of the House of Representatives
- Incumbent
- Assumed office 2 November 2021
- Preceded by: Hideyuki Tanaka
- Constituency: Kyoto 4th
- In office 21 April 2016 – 28 September 2017
- Preceded by: Kenta Izumi
- Succeeded by: Multi-member district
- Constituency: Kinki PR
- In office 11 September 2005 – 16 November 2012
- Preceded by: Multi-member district
- Succeeded by: Hideyuki Tanaka
- Constituency: Kinki PR (2005–2009); Kyoto 4th (2009–2012)

Personal details
- Born: 1 February 1967 (age 59) Tokyo, Japan
- Party: Liberal Democratic (Shikōkai)
- Other political affiliations: DPJ (2003–2016); DP (2016–2017); KnT (2017–2018); Independent (2018–2025); Yūshi no Kai (2021–2025)
- Education: Kyoto University
- Website: 北神圭朗公式サイト

Keiro Kitagami (北神 圭朗, Kitagami Keirō; born 1 February 1967) is a Japanese politician who is serving as a member of the House of Representatives in the National Diet.

A native of Tokyo, Kitagami studied abroad at Servite High School in Anaheim, California, and is graduate of Kyoto University. He joined the Ministry of Finance early in his career. After leaving the ministry, he was elected for the first time in 2005. In 2004, Kitagami was honored as an Inamori Fellow by the Inamori Foundation and in 2007 as a Young Global Leader at the World Economic Forum (Davos Forum). Kitagami was appointed as Parliamentary Vice-Minister of Economy, Trade and Industry by Yoshihiko Noda in 2011, and served as Special Advisor to the Prime Minister during the Noda Cabinet in 2012.
