= Meiji University of Integrative Medicine =

Private university in Japan

Coordinates: 35.181629°N 135.491226°E

Meiji University of Integrative Medicine (明治国際医療大学, Meiji kokusai iryō daigaku) is a private university in Nantan, Kyoto, Japan. The predecessor of the school was founded in 1925. It was chartered as a junior college in 1978 and became a four-year college in 1983. The present name of the school was adopted in 2008.
