= Kitakuwada District, Kyoto =

Former district in Kyōto prefecture, Japan

Kitakuwada (北桑田郡, Kitakuwada-gun) was a district located in Kyoto Prefecture, Japan.

As of 2005, the district had an estimated population of 5,233 and a density of 15.37 persons per km^{2}. The total area was 340.47 km^{2}.

== Former towns and villages ==
- Keihoku
- Miyama

== Mergers ==
- On April 1, 2005 - the town of Keihoku merged into the city of Kyoto (Ukyo Ward).
- On January 1, 2006 - the town of Miyama, along with the towns of Hiyoshi, Sonobe and Yagi (all from Funai District), were merged to create the city of Nantan. Kitakuwada District was dissolved as a result of this merger.
