= Miyama, Kyoto =

Dissolved municipality in Kyoto prefecture, Japan

Coordinates: 35.312899°N 135.622069°E

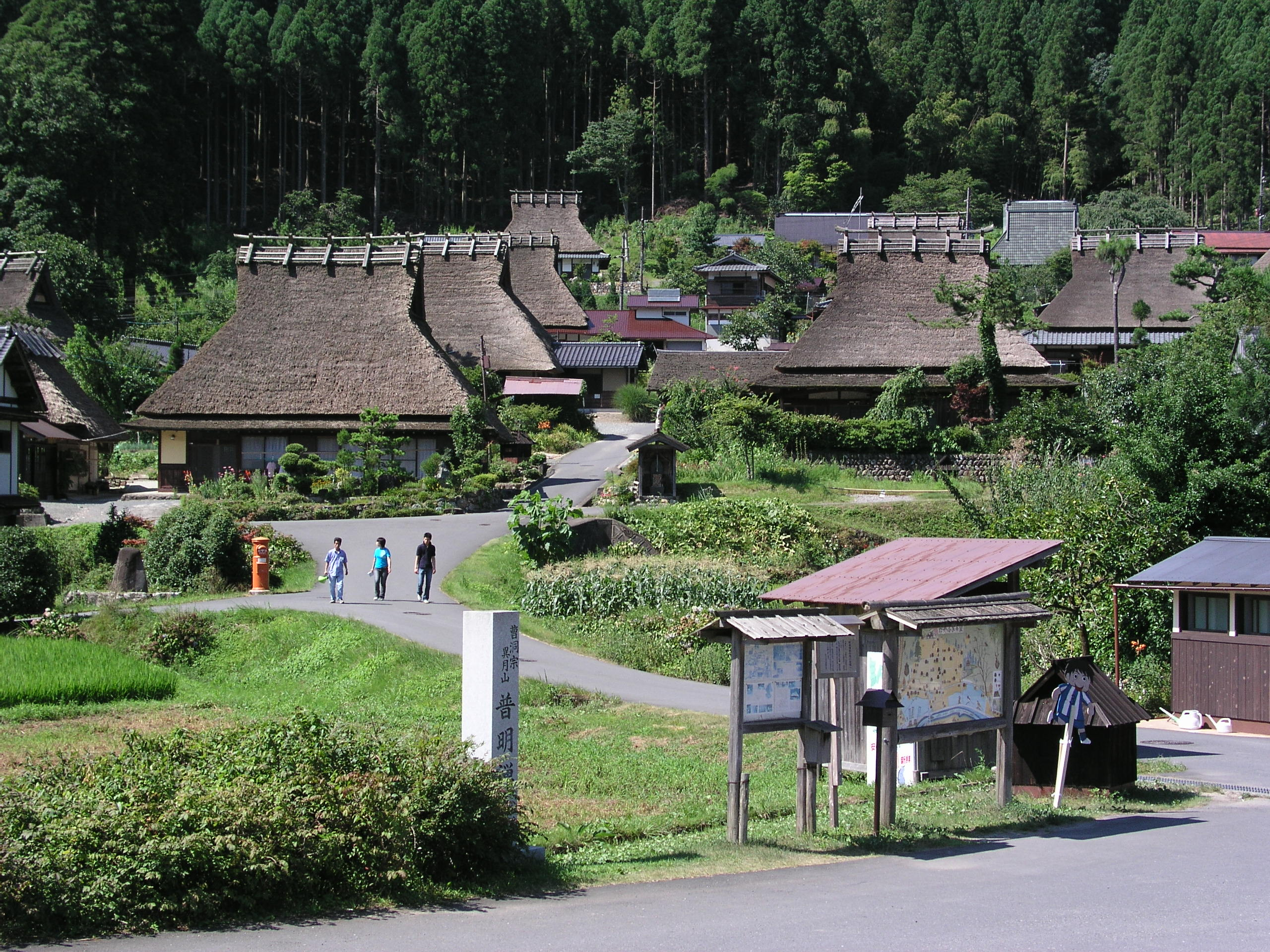
Traditional houses in Miyama

Miyama (美山町, Miyama-chō) is an agricultural town located in Kitakuwada District, Kyoto Prefecture, Japan.

As of 2003, the town had an estimated population of 5,070 and a density of 14.89 persons per km^{2}. The total area was 340.47 km^{2}.

On January 1, 2006, Miyama, along with the towns of Hiyoshi, Sonobe, and Yagi (all from Funai District), was merged to create the city of Nantan.

== Tourism ==
Miyama is best known for its thatched roof houses that create a rustic village ambience. Its top tourist attraction is Miyama Kayabuki-no-Sato.

Miyama is located 55km from Kyoto City. The various homestay options in the town facilitate short getaways for people who want a quick escape from city life.
