= Hiyoshi, Kyoto =

Hiyoshi
- Town
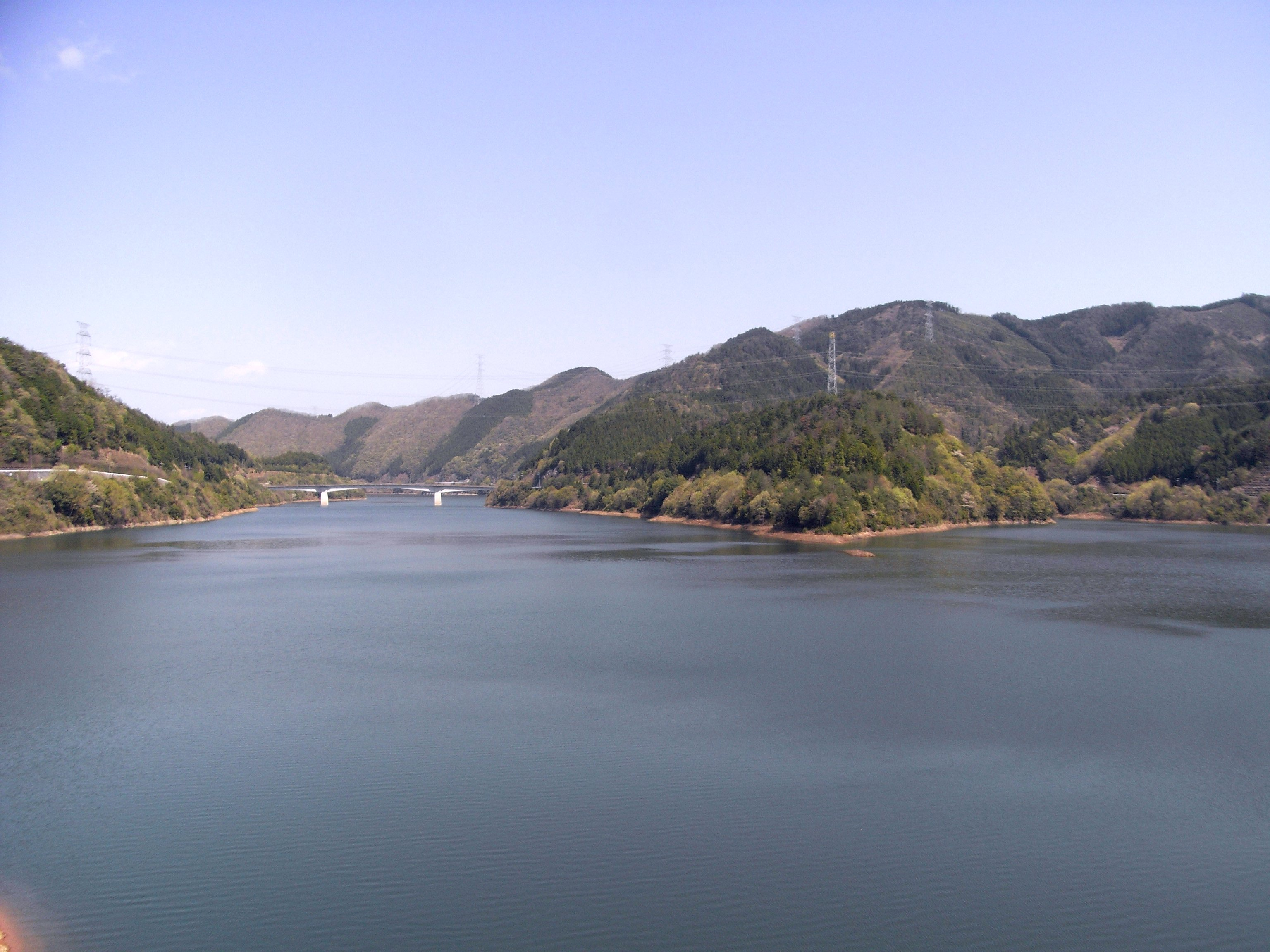
- Hiyoshi Dam

- Flag Emblem
- Interactive map of Hiyoshi
- Country: Japan
- Prefecture: Kyoto Prefecture
- District: Funai district

Hiyoshi (日吉町, Hiyoshi-chō) was a town located in Funai District, Kyoto Prefecture, Japan.

As of 2003, the town had an estimated population of 6,090 and a density of 49.31 persons per km^{2}. The total area was 123.50 km^{2}.

On January 1, 2006, Hiyoshi, along with the towns of Sonobe and Yagi (all from Funai District), and the town of Miyama (from Kitakuwada District), was merged to create the city of Nantan.
