= Sonobe, Kyoto =

Town in Kyoto, Japan

Sonobe 園部町
- Town
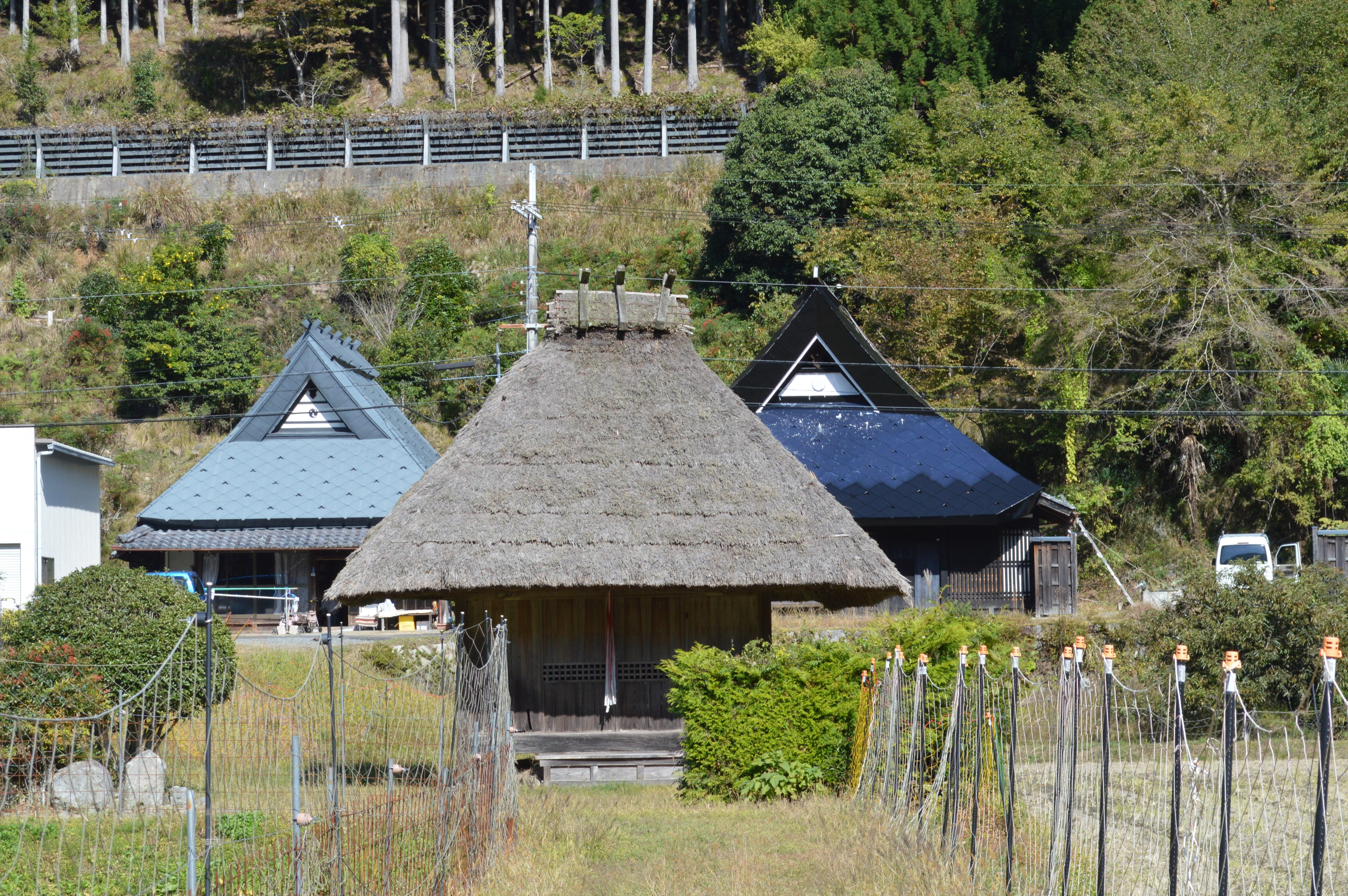
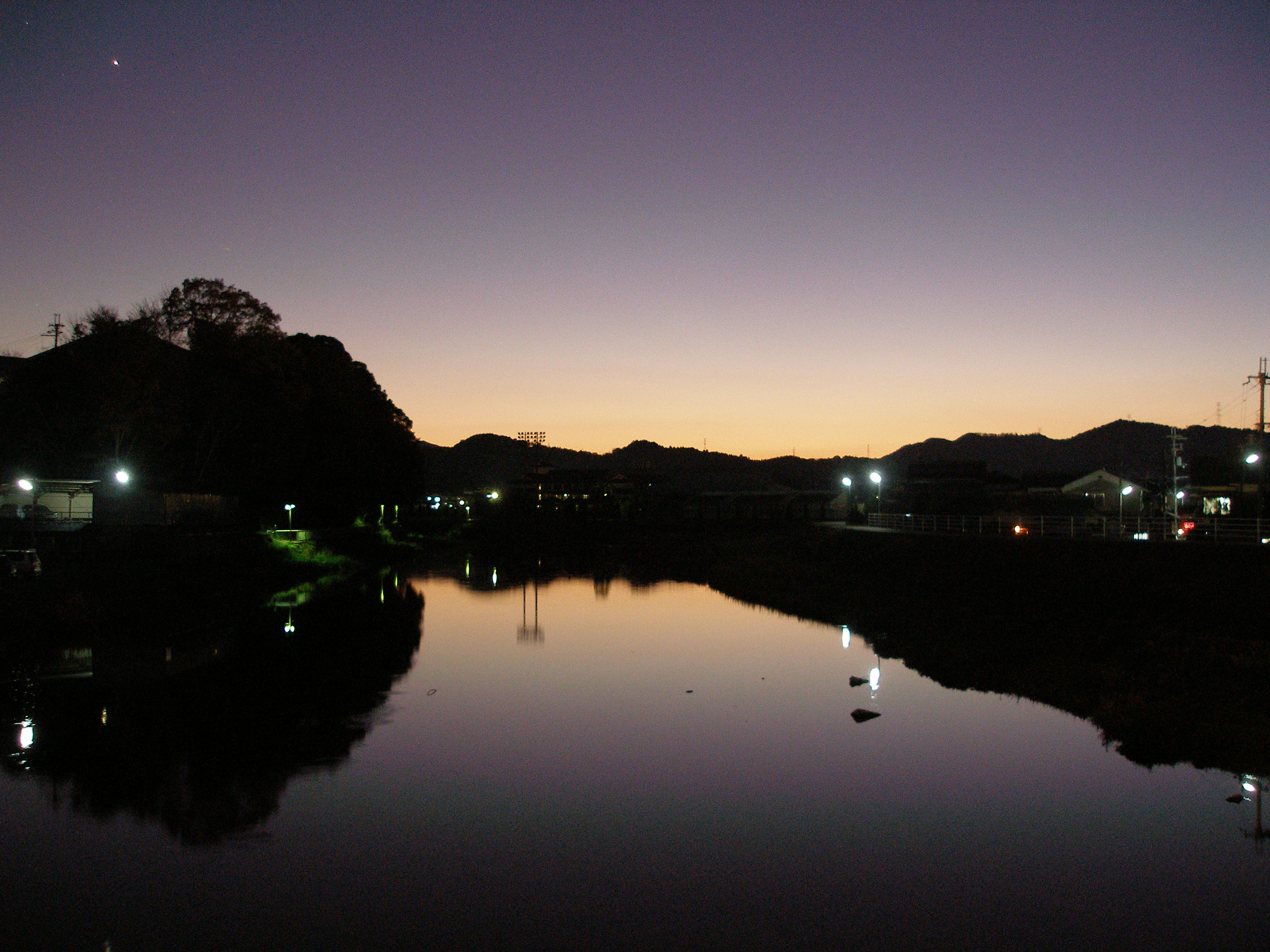
- Traditional thatched houses in Sonobe Sonobe sunset

- Flag Emblem

- Location within Japan
- Country: Japan
- Region: Kansai
- Prefecture: Kyoto Prefecture
- District: Funai District

Area
  - Total: 102.78 km^{2} (39.68 sq mi)

Population (2003)
  - Total: 16,958
  - Density: 164.99/km^{2} (427.3/sq mi)
- Time zone: UTC+9 (Japan Standard Time)
- Merged into: Nantan, Kyoto,

Sonobe (園部町, Sonobe-chō) was a town located in Funai District, Kyoto Prefecture, Japan.

On January 1, 2006, Sonobe, along with the towns of Hiyoshi and Yagi (all from Funai District), and the town of Miyama (from Kitakuwada District), was merged to create the city of Nantan.

Sonobe served as the administrative center of Nantan.

== Notable people ==
- Shigeru Miyamoto, video game designer and Nintendo's representative director
