= Nantan =

Nantan 南丹市
- City
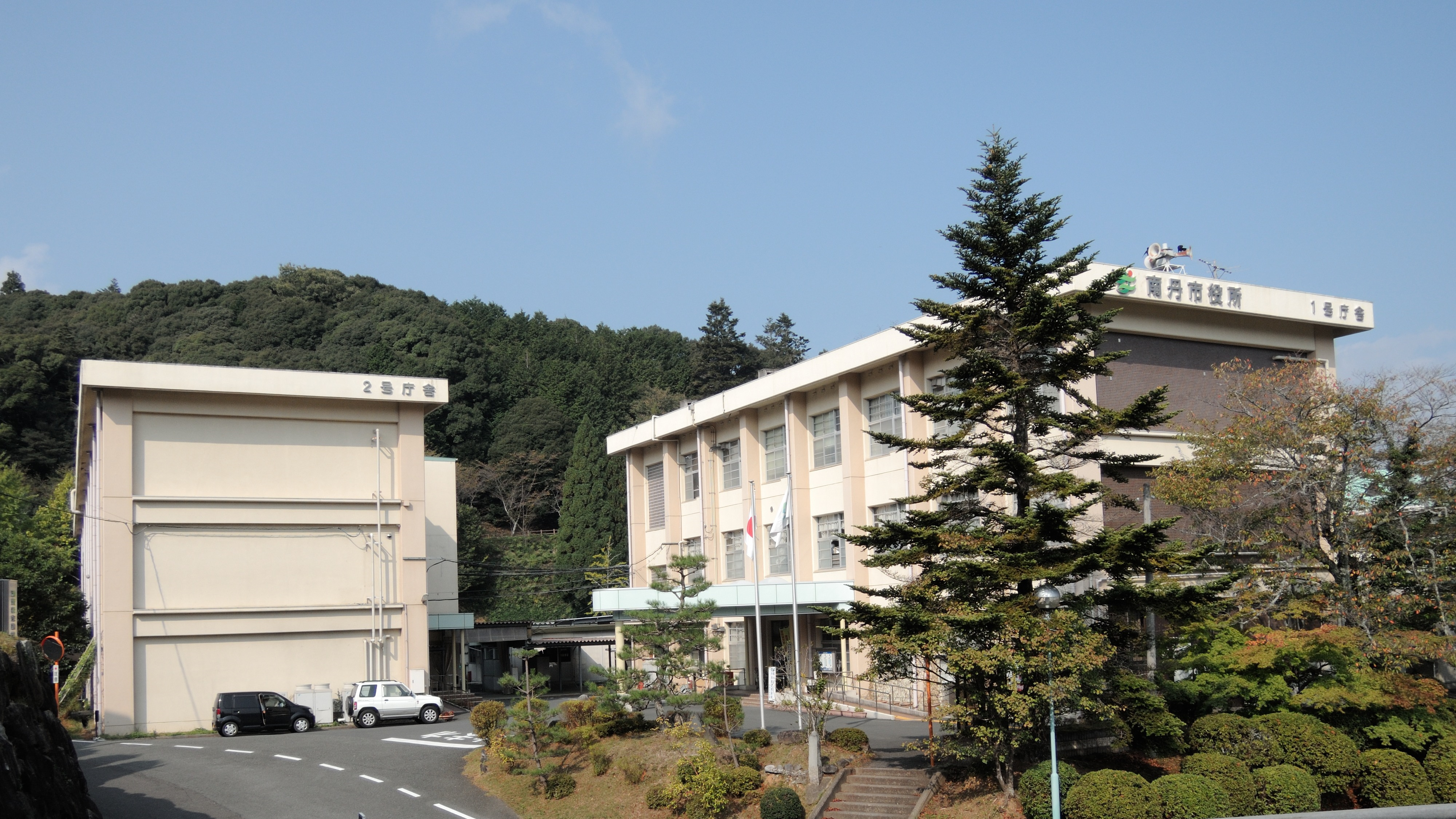
- Nantan City hall

- Flag Emblem

- Location of Nantan in Kyoto Prefecture

- Location in Japan
- Coordinates: 35°6′N 135°28′E
- Country: Japan
- Region: Kansai
- Prefecture: Kyoto

Government
  - Mayor: Yoshitaka Nishimura (西村好高) - from March 2026

Area
  - Total: 616.40 km^{2} (237.99 sq mi)

Population (May 1, 2022)
  - Total: 30,744
  - Density: 49.877/km^{2} (129.18/sq mi)
- Time zone: UTC+09:00 (JST)
- City hall address: 47 Kozakura, Sonobe-cho, Nantan-shi, Kyoto-fu 622-8651
- Climate: Cfa
- Website: Official website
- Symbols
- Bird: Blue-and-white flycatcher
- Flower: Cherry blossom
- Tree: Fagus crenata

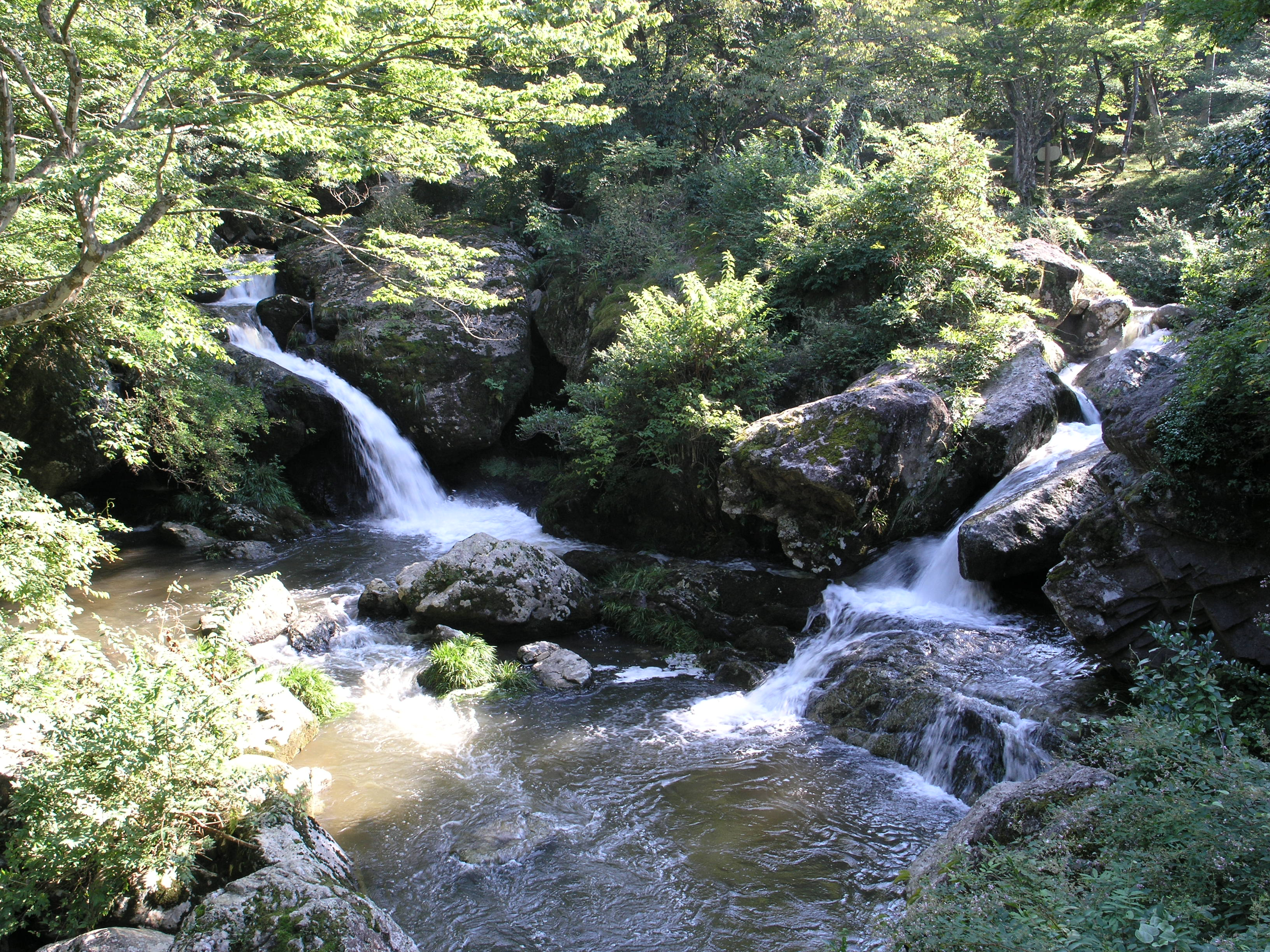
Rurikei Prefectural Natural Park

Nantan (南丹市, Nantan-shi) is a city located in Kyoto Prefecture, Japan. As of 1 May 2022, the city had an estimated population of 30,744 in 14406 households and a population density of 50 persons per km^{2} (130 per sq. mi.). The total area of the city is 616.40 square kilometres (237.99 sq mi).

== Geography ==
Nantan is located in the southern part of the Tamba region in central Kyoto Prefecture.

=== Neighbouring municipalities ===
Fukui Prefecture

- Ōi

Hyōgo Prefecture

- Tamba-Sasayama

Kyoto Prefecture

- Ayabe
- Kameoka
- Kyōtamba
- Kyoto

Osaka Prefecture

- Nose

Shiga Prefecture

- Takashima

=== Climate ===
Nantan has a humid subtropical climate (Köppen Cfa) characterized by warm, wet summers and cold winters with heavy snowfall. The average annual temperature in Nantan is 13.0 °C (55.4 °F). The average annual rainfall is 1,808.3 mm (71.19 in) with July as the wettest month. The temperatures are highest on average in August, at around 25.2 °C (77.4 °F), and lowest in January, at around 1.7 °C (35.1 °F). Its record high is 36.7 °C (98.1 °F), reached on 27 July 2023, and its record low is −11.8 °C (10.8 °F), reached on 28 February 1981.

Climate data for Nantan (1991−2020 normals, extremes 1978−present)
Month	Jan	Feb	Mar	Apr	May	Jun	Jul	Aug	Sep	Oct	Nov	Dec	Year
Record high °C (°F)	16.9 (62.4)	21.1 (70.0)	25.1 (77.2)	29.8 (85.6)	32.7 (90.9)	36.0 (96.8)	37.7 (99.9)	37.2 (99.0)	36.2 (97.2)	30.8 (87.4)	26.7 (80.1)	21.8 (71.2)	37.7 (99.9)
Mean daily maximum °C (°F)	6.2 (43.2)	7.0 (44.6)	11.5 (52.7)	17.8 (64.0)	22.9 (73.2)	25.8 (78.4)	29.7 (85.5)	31.2 (88.2)	26.6 (79.9)	20.9 (69.6)	15.2 (59.4)	9.2 (48.6)	18.7 (65.6)
Daily mean °C (°F)	1.7 (35.1)	2.1 (35.8)	5.6 (42.1)	11.1 (52.0)	16.2 (61.2)	20.3 (68.5)	24.3 (75.7)	25.2 (77.4)	21.2 (70.2)	15.1 (59.2)	9.4 (48.9)	4.2 (39.6)	13.0 (55.5)
Mean daily minimum °C (°F)	−1.3 (29.7)	−1.5 (29.3)	0.7 (33.3)	5.0 (41.0)	10.4 (50.7)	15.8 (60.4)	20.5 (68.9)	21.0 (69.8)	17.1 (62.8)	11.0 (51.8)	5.2 (41.4)	0.7 (33.3)	8.7 (47.7)
Record low °C (°F)	−11.2 (11.8)	−11.8 (10.8)	−8.7 (16.3)	−3.3 (26.1)	1.3 (34.3)	4.2 (39.6)	11.9 (53.4)	12.8 (55.0)	6.7 (44.1)	1.3 (34.3)	−3.7 (25.3)	−6.7 (19.9)	−11.8 (10.8)
Average precipitation mm (inches)	140.3 (5.52)	128.5 (5.06)	139.5 (5.49)	121.9 (4.80)	149.7 (5.89)	177.1 (6.97)	205.1 (8.07)	148.8 (5.86)	202.3 (7.96)	161.7 (6.37)	107.3 (4.22)	126.3 (4.97)	1,808.3 (71.19)
Average snowfall cm (inches)	73 (29)	73 (29)	9 (3.5)	0 (0)	0 (0)	0 (0)	0 (0)	0 (0)	0 (0)	0 (0)	0 (0)	26 (10)	179 (70)
Average precipitation days (≥ 1.0 mm)	17.9	16.2	15.4	11.9	11.3	12.6	12.7	9.2	12.0	11.4	12.3	16.1	159
Average snowy days (≥ 3 cm)	6.9	6.6	1.0	0	0	0	0	0	0	0	0	2.2	16.7
Mean monthly sunshine hours	74.1	85.3	124.1	168.2	184.3	129.9	136.9	177.1	126.5	128.5	109.5	88.0	1,533.8
Source: Japan Meteorological Agency

Climate data for Sonobe, Nantan (2002−2020 normals, extremes 2002−present)
Month	Jan	Feb	Mar	Apr	May	Jun	Jul	Aug	Sep	Oct	Nov	Dec	Year
Record high °C (°F)	17.3 (63.1)	21.5 (70.7)	24.7 (76.5)	31.1 (88.0)	33.0 (91.4)	36.6 (97.9)	39.1 (102.4)	38.5 (101.3)	37.8 (100.0)	31.8 (89.2)	25.2 (77.4)	22.5 (72.5)	39.1 (102.4)
Mean daily maximum °C (°F)	7.7 (45.9)	9.0 (48.2)	13.0 (55.4)	19.1 (66.4)	24.4 (75.9)	27.4 (81.3)	31.0 (87.8)	32.8 (91.0)	28.3 (82.9)	22.2 (72.0)	16.3 (61.3)	10.3 (50.5)	20.1 (68.2)
Daily mean °C (°F)	2.2 (36.0)	3.3 (37.9)	6.5 (43.7)	12.0 (53.6)	17.5 (63.5)	21.6 (70.9)	25.4 (77.7)	26.4 (79.5)	22.4 (72.3)	15.9 (60.6)	9.7 (49.5)	4.4 (39.9)	13.9 (57.1)
Mean daily minimum °C (°F)	−2.0 (28.4)	−1.4 (29.5)	0.6 (33.1)	5.2 (41.4)	11.3 (52.3)	16.9 (62.4)	21.5 (70.7)	22.0 (71.6)	17.9 (64.2)	11.1 (52.0)	4.6 (40.3)	−0.1 (31.8)	9.0 (48.1)
Record low °C (°F)	−10.8 (12.6)	−10.5 (13.1)	−5.5 (22.1)	−3.2 (26.2)	1.6 (34.9)	8.1 (46.6)	15.0 (59.0)	13.9 (57.0)	9.1 (48.4)	0.8 (33.4)	−3.9 (25.0)	−12.8 (9.0)	−12.8 (9.0)
Average precipitation mm (inches)	60.8 (2.39)	78.4 (3.09)	115.2 (4.54)	117.4 (4.62)	129.8 (5.11)	166.5 (6.56)	205.3 (8.08)	159.5 (6.28)	200.3 (7.89)	162.9 (6.41)	72.9 (2.87)	77.6 (3.06)	1,570.2 (61.82)
Average precipitation days (≥ 1.0 mm)	10.2	11.4	11.6	10.8	9.8	12.0	12.6	8.9	10.5	9.1	8.2	9.7	124.8
Mean monthly sunshine hours	103.4	107.4	151.4	179.6	191.9	140.6	142.7	193.4	147.3	142.1	117.8	109.4	1,729.6
Source: Japan Meteorological Agency

== Demographics ==
Per Japanese census data, the population of Nantan has declined slightly in recent decades.

Historical population
Year	Pop.	±%
1960	45,262	—
1965	41,853	−7.5%
1970	39,318	−6.1%
1975	38,409	−2.3%
1980	38,215	−0.5%
1985	37,709	−1.3%
1990	36,693	−2.7%
1995	37,841	+3.1%
2000	37,617	−0.6%
2005	36,736	−2.3%
2010	35,214	−4.1%
2015	33,145	−5.9%
2020	31,629	−4.6%
Nantan population statistics

== History ==
The area of the modern town of Nantan was within ancient Tanba Province, and may have been the site of the provincial capital in the Nara period. During the Edo Period, Sonobe Domain was located within its borders. The town of Sonobe was established with the creation of the modern municipalities system on April 1, 1889. Sonobe merged with the neighboring towns of Hiyoshi, and Yagi (all from Funai District), and the town of Miyama (from Kitakuwada District) to form the city of Nantan on January 1, 2006.

== Government ==
Nantan has a mayor-council form of government with a directly elected mayor and a unicameral town council of 22 members. Nantan, together with the town of Kyōtamba contributes one member to the Kyoto Prefectural Assembly. In terms of national politics, the city is part of Kyoto 4th district of the lower house of the Diet of Japan.

== Economy ==
Nantan has an economy based on regional commerce, agriculture and forestry. The main products include mizuna and other "Kyoto vegetables".

== Education ==
=== Colleges and universities ===
- Bukkyo University, Sonobe campus
- College of Medical Technology Meiji University of Oriental Medicine
- Kyoto College of Medical Technology
- Kyoto University of Arts and Crafts
- Meiji University of Integrative Medicine

=== Primary and secondary schools ===
Nantan has seven public elementary schools and five public middle schools operated by the city government and three public high schools operated by the Kyoto Prefectural Department of Education. There is also one private middle school and one private high school. The prefecture also operates one special education school for the handicapped.

== Transportation ==
=== Railway ===
JR West – San'in Main Line / Sagano Line

- Yagi - Yoshitomi - Sonobe - Funaoka - Hiyoshi - Shinkyū-Daigaku-mae - Goma

=== Highway ===
- Kyoto Jūkan Expressway
- National Route 9
- National Route 162
- National Route 372
- National Route 477

== Sister cities ==
- Clutha District, New Zealand
- Manila, Philippines

== Local attractions ==
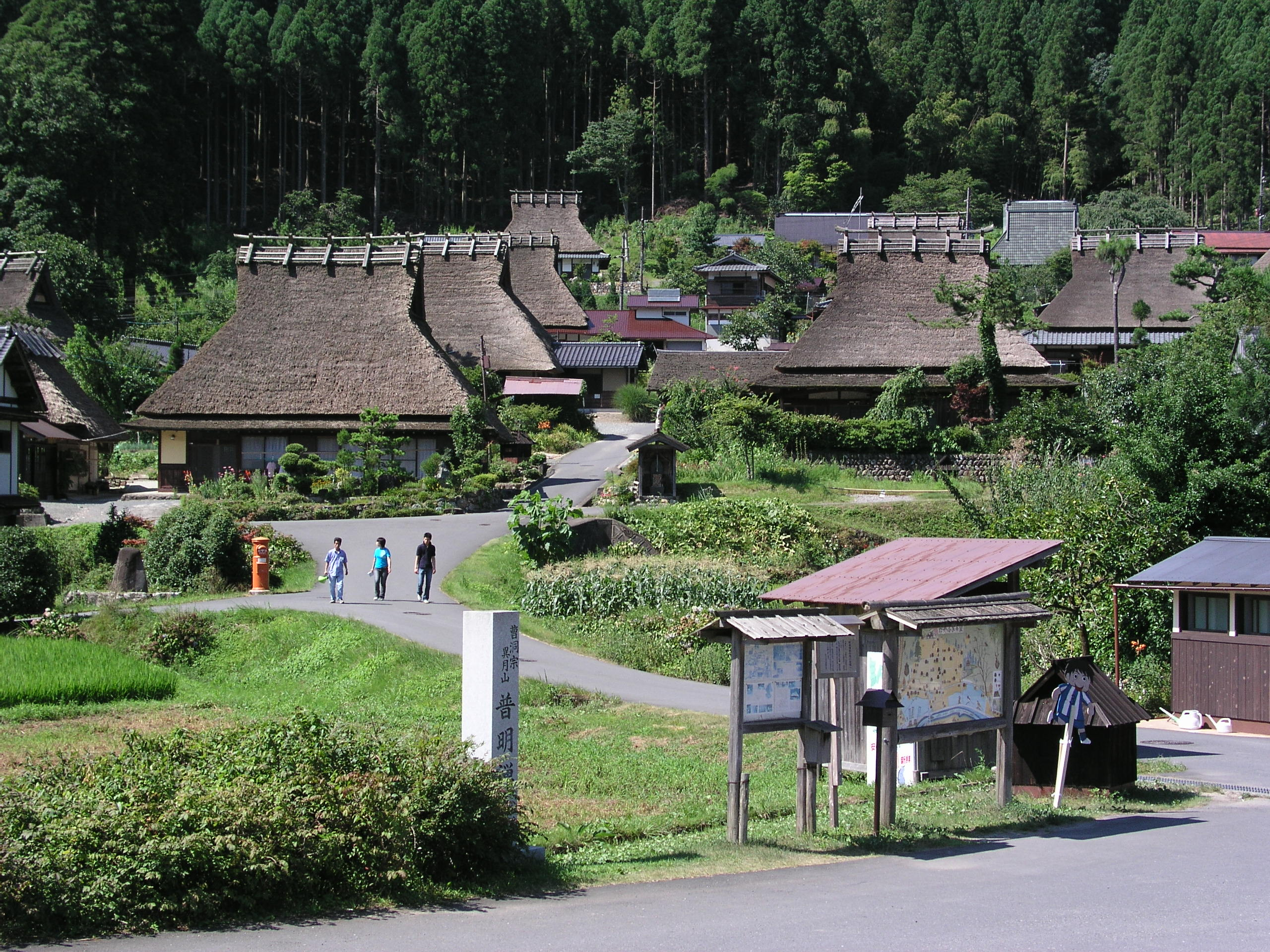
Kayabuki no sato

Sights include the Rurikei Prefectural Natural Park and Miyama Kayabuki-no-Sato. Miyama Kayabuki-no-Sato is a small village that consists of cottages made with thatched (kayabuki) roofs and showcase the classic and traditional scenery of Japan. Within this town is a museum that exhibits the history and agriculture used to make these famous thatched houses, located in what is known as the Miyama Archive of Local History and Folklore. Upon visitation, it is also possible to go in and walk around a few of these houses to experience the history first hand.

== Noted people from Nantan ==
- Makoto Fujita – actor
- Shigeru Miyamoto – video game designer and creator of Mario and The Legend of Zelda
- Yasuhiro Nakagawa – politician
- Hiromu Nonaka – politician
- Bonnie Pink – singer-songwriter
- Yoshimi Tanaka – politician
