= Yagi, Kyoto =

Dissolved municipality in Kyoto prefecture, Japan

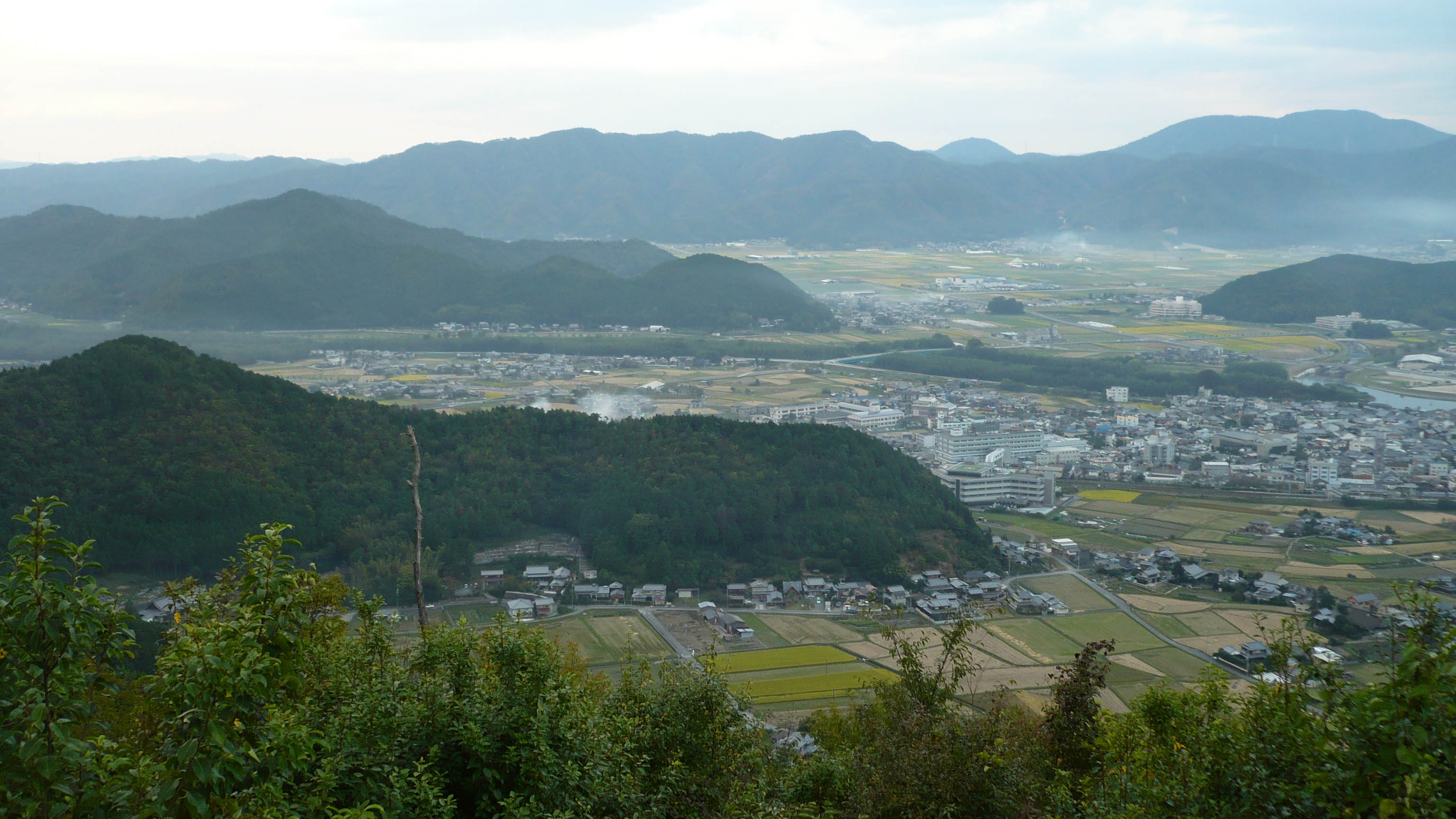
View from Yagi castle ruins

Yagi (八木町, Yagi-chō) was a town located in Funai District, Kyoto Prefecture, Japan.

As of 2003, the town had an estimated population of 8,916 and a density of 179.90 persons per km^{2}. The total area was 49.56 km^{2}.

On January 1, 2006, Yagi, along with the towns of Hiyoshi, Sonobe (all from Funai District), and the town of Miyama (from Kitakuwada District), was merged to create the city of Nantan.

Nestled between mountains and situated in the Ōi River basin, Yagi is more a collection of small villages than a single town. The town center, situated along the river, is only a small part of Yagi's total area. Though Yagi is decidedly rural, its proximity to Kyoto by train makes it an extended suburb of sorts. It is estimated that about 60% of Yagi's adult working population commutes to Kyoto or Osaka daily. Yagi is easily accessible via the JR Sagano Train Line from Kyoto.

Yagi has a long history dating back at least as far as the Nara Period, when Yagi's extant Sanin Road was a main route through the prefecture, linking Kyoto to Kameoka and Sonobe.

In 1960 Yagi and the surrounding area was hit by a massive typhoon. The banks of the Ōi River collapsed, and the town suffered extensive flooding. A number of people died during the storm and the flood that followed.

Yagi has one junior high school and five elementary schools: Yagi, Tomimoto, Shinjo, Yoshitomi and Kamiyoshi. Yagi has been a long-time participant in the JET Programme, and employs a foreigner and native speaker to teach English in the town's schools.

== Notable attributes ==
Yagi is famous throughout the Kansai Region for its annual fireworks festival, held on or around August 14. Thousands of people gather near Yagi's Ōi River Bridge to watch the fireworks show, the largest of its kind in Kyoto Prefecture. The festival was first held in 1947, and officially begins every year at 6 p.m. with Tōrō nagashi, a Buddhist ceremony in which paper lanterns are floated down the river. The fireworks show is now held both as celebration of summer and a commemoration for those who died in the 1960 typhoon.

Yagi is also known for several progressive environmental projects. In 1995, Yagi Junior High became the first school in Japan to be solar powered, and Yoshitomi and Shinjo elementary schools also use supplemental solar and wind energy. Additionally, Yagi's Bio-Ecology Center turns cow manure from nearby dairy farms into electricity by utilizing the methane gas produced during decomposition.

Seigen-ji temple, in Yagi's northern foothills, is famous because it houses 22 wood carvings created by the wandering ascetic priest Mokujiki-san. Mokujiki-san traveled throughout Japan on a pilgrimage whose purpose was to spread Buddhist teachings and carve 1,000 images of the Buddha and his disciples. Shaka, the image of Buddha at Seigen-ji, is the 1,000th carving, which Mokujiki-san completed in 1806.

Yagi's northern foothills are also home to Kyoto Taishakuten, a Buddhist temple established in 780. Other temples and shrines are to be found throughout the region.
