= Yura River (Japan) =

Yura River 由良川
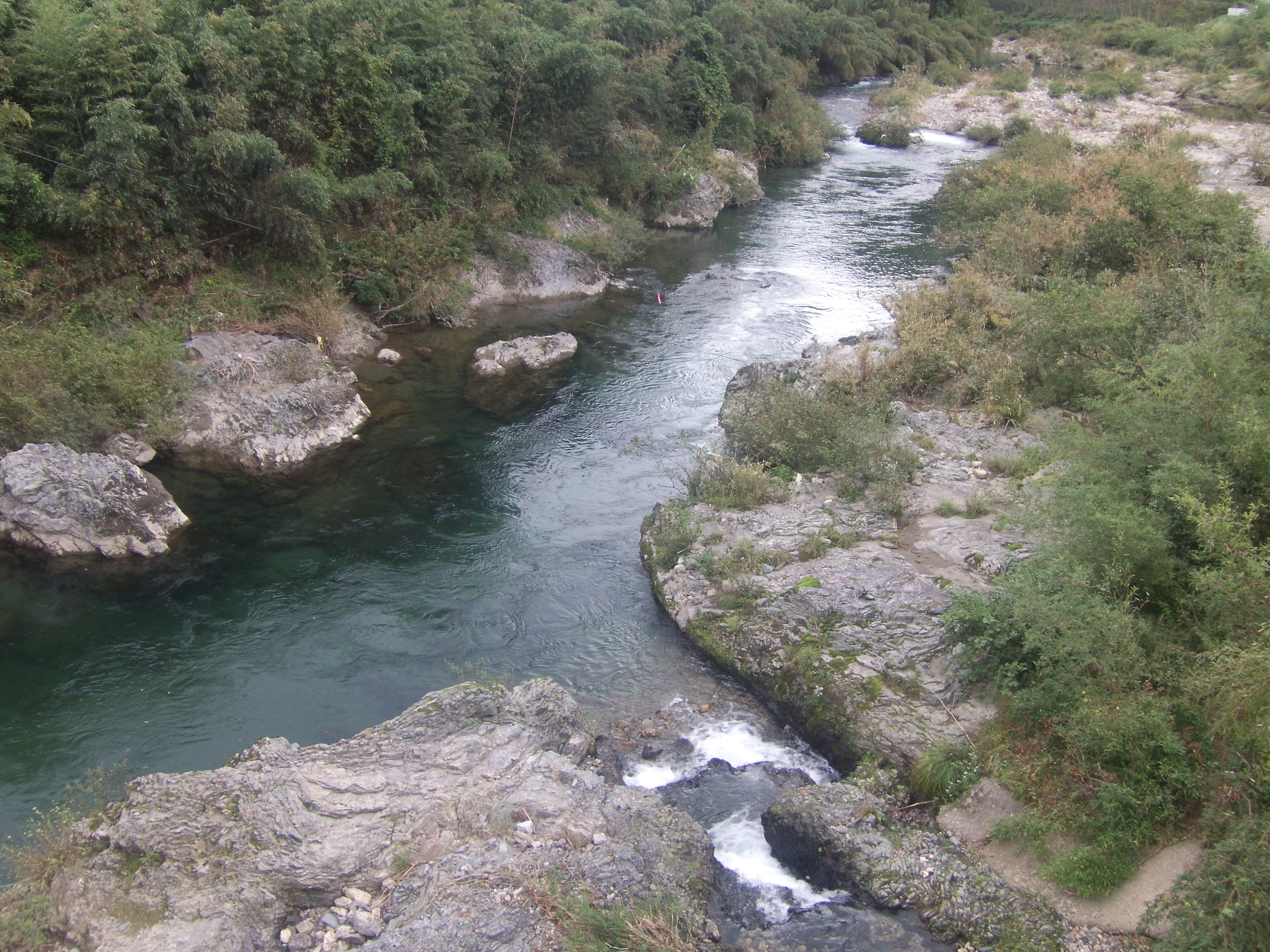
- Yura River in Nantan, 2016

- Location within Japan

Location
- Country: Japan
- State: Honshu
- Region: Kyoto, Hyōgo

Physical characteristics
- Source: Mikunidake
  - elevation: 775.9 m (2,546 ft)
- Mouth: Sea of Japan
  - coordinates: 35°30′59″N 135°17′15″E
- Length: 146 km (91 mi)
- Basin size: 1,880 km^{2} (730 sq mi)

The Yura River (由良川, Yuragawa) is a Class A river in Kyoto Prefecture and Hyōgo Prefecture, Japan . It is 146 km (91 mi) long and has a watershed of 1,880 km^{2} (730 sq mi).
