= Funai District =

District in Kyōto prefecture, Japan

Coordinates: 35°10′N 135°25′E

Location of Kyōtamba in Kyoto prefecture

Funai (船井郡, Funai-gun) is a district located in Kyoto Prefecture, Japan.

As of 2006, the district has an estimated population of 17,945 and a density of 59 persons per km^{2}. The total area is 303.07 km^{2}.

== Towns and villages ==
- Kyōtamba

== Mergers ==
- On October 11, 2005 the towns of Tanba, Mizuho and Wachi merged to form the new town of Kyōtamba.
- On January 1, 2006 the towns of Hiyoshi, Sonobe and Yagi merged with the town of Miyama, from Kitakuwada District, to form the new city of Nantan.
