= 223 series =

Japanese train type

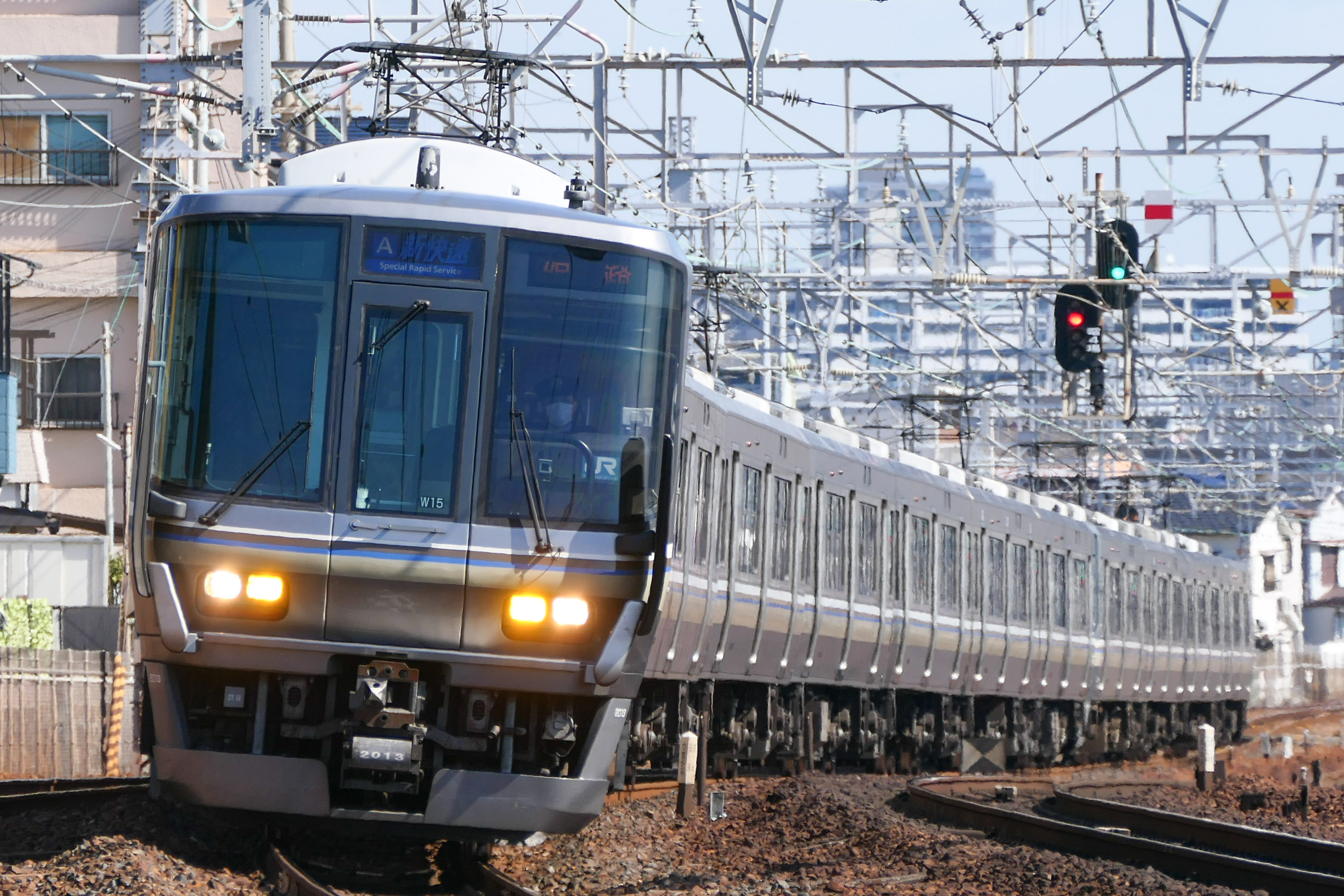
- 223-2000 series set W15, February 2021
- In service: 1994–present
- Manufacturers: Hitachi, Kawasaki Heavy Industries, Kinki Sharyo
- Built at: Kudamatsu, Kobe, Higashiōsaka
- Replaced: 103 series, 113 series, 115 series, 117 series, 213 series, 221 series
- Constructed: 1993–2008
- Entered service: 1 April 1994
- Refurbished: 2018–
- Number built: 927 vehicles
- Number in service: 926 vehicles
- Number scrapped: 1 vehicle (KuMoYa 223-9001 "U@tech")
- Formation: 2/4/6/8 cars per trainset
- Fleet numbers: HE401–HE435 (223-0/2500 series); V1–V55, V58–V66 (223-1000/2000/Aboshi-based 6000 series 4-car sets); W1–W39 (223-1000/2000 series 8-car sets); J1–J14 (223-2000 series 6-car sets); P1–P7 (223-5000 series); F1–F16 (223-5500 series); MA1–MA20 (Miyahara-based 223-6000 series); R01-R02 (Kyoto-based 223-6000 series)
- Operator: JR West
- Depots: Hineno, Kyoto, Aboshi, Miyahara, Fukuchiyama, Okayama
- Lines served: A Tōkaidō Main Line; A Sanyō Main Line; A Hokuriku Main Line; A Akō Line; B Kosei Line; C Kusatsu Line; E Sanin Main Line; G Fukuchiyama Line; J Bantan Line; L Maizuru Line; O Osaka Loop Line; R Hanwa Line; S Kansai Airport Line; W Kisei Main Line; Seto-Ōhashi Line

Specifications
- Car body construction: Stainless steel
- Car length: 20,000 mm (65 ft 7 in)
- Width: 2,950 mm (9 ft 8 in)
- Doors: 3 pairs per side 2 pairs per side (A-SEAT cars)
- Maximum speed: 120 km/h (75 mph) (223-0/2500/5500/6000 series), 130 km/h (81 mph) (other series)
- Traction system: Variable frequency 3-level GTO (223-0 series); 3-level IGBT (223-1000/5000 series); 2-level IGBT (223-9000 series); 2 or 3-level IGBT (other series)
- Acceleration: 2.5 km/(h⋅s) (1.6 mph/s)
- Deceleration: 223-0/2500/5500 series:3.5 km/(h⋅s) (2.2 mph/s) (service); 4.2 km/(h⋅s) (2.6 mph/s) (emergency) other series:4.3 km/(h⋅s) (2.7 mph/s) (service); 5.2 km/(h⋅s) (3.2 mph/s) (emergency)
- HVAC: WAU702 x2 (223-0 series); WAU705 x2 (powered car), WAU304 x2 (trailer car)(223-1000 series); WAU705A x2 (other series)
- Electric system: 1,500 V DC overhead
- Current collection: WPS27D scissors-type pantograph single-arm pantograph (223-9000 series)
- Bogies: WDT55A (powered car),WTR239A (trailer car)(223-0 series); WDT56 (powered car),WTR234 (trailer car)(223-1000 series); WDT56XA (223-9000 series); WDT59 (powered car),WTR243 (trailer car)(other series)
- Braking systems: Dynamic brake (223-9000 series), regenerative brake, electronically controlled pneumatic brakes, snow-resistant brake
- Safety systems: ATS-SW, ATS-P (except 223-5000 series)
- Coupling system: Shibata-Type
- Multiple working: 225 series 221 series (for 223-5500/6000 series only); JR Shikoku 5000 series (for 223-5000 series only); 213 series (U@tech)
- Track gauge: 1,067 mm (3 ft 6 in)

The 223 series (223系, 223-kei) is a suburban electric multiple unit (EMU) train type operated by the West Japan Railway Company (JR-West) in the Kansai region, Chūgoku region and Shikoku region of Japan. Multiple batches of the model have been built with varying differences (particularly motor output control), although the overall general appearance remains similar.

Design of the rolling stock was an improved adaptation of the 221 series, with three pairs of doors per side per car and a transverse seating layout. Production of the train type first began in 1993.

== Variants ==
=== 223-0, 223-2500 series ===
The first model (223–0) was delivered earlier than expected, and saw introduction into service on 1 April 1994, on the Hanwa Line. On 4 September of the same year, it began serving the Kansai Airport Line Rapid Service as Kansai International Airport opened. The train was initially fitted with luggage racks, for passengers travelling to/from the airport. A 1 + 2 seating configuration has been adopted to allow passengers to place bulky luggage on the floor where necessary.

Between 1996 and 1998, baggage cars were included, but due to lack of use it was reverted. Unable to cope with the increasing passenger traffic, new cars were produced and designated as the 223–2500, based on the 223-2000 model. These cars were introduced in 1999.

The 223-0 and 223–2500 series see regular service on the Osaka Loop Line, Hanwa Line (and Kansai Airport Line), and the Kisei Main Line. They are typically operated in 4+4-car formations, uncoupled at Hineno.

In May 2018, set HE401 was refurbished, and began test running later on the same month.

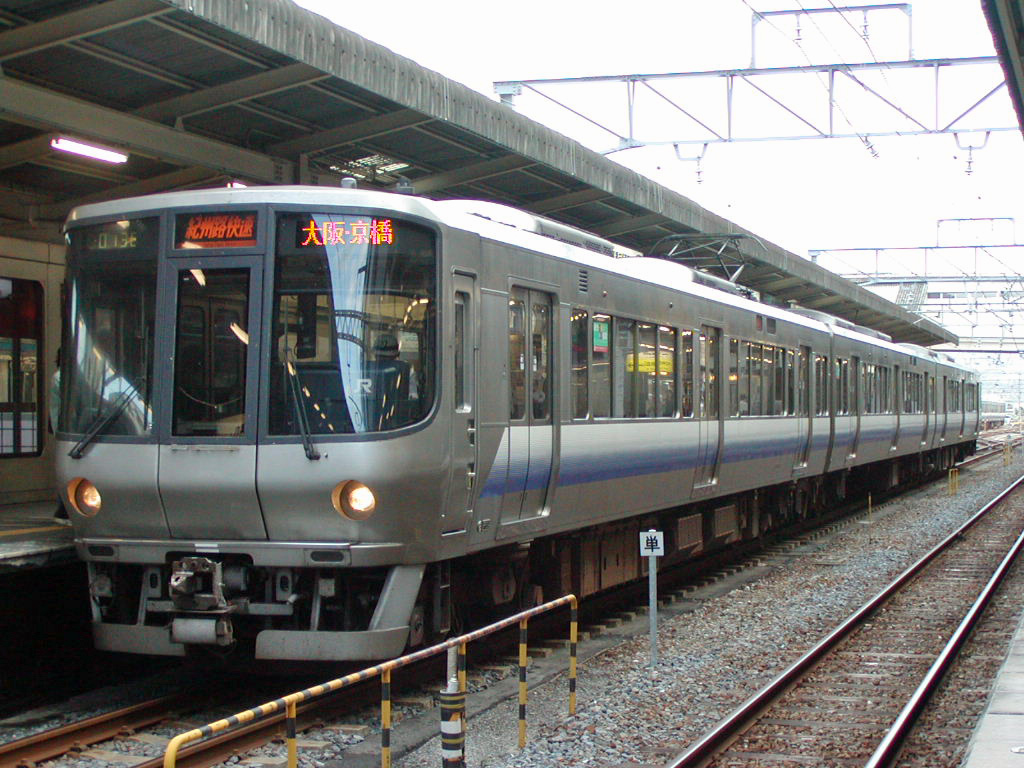
223-0 series as it was when it first appeared, August 2004

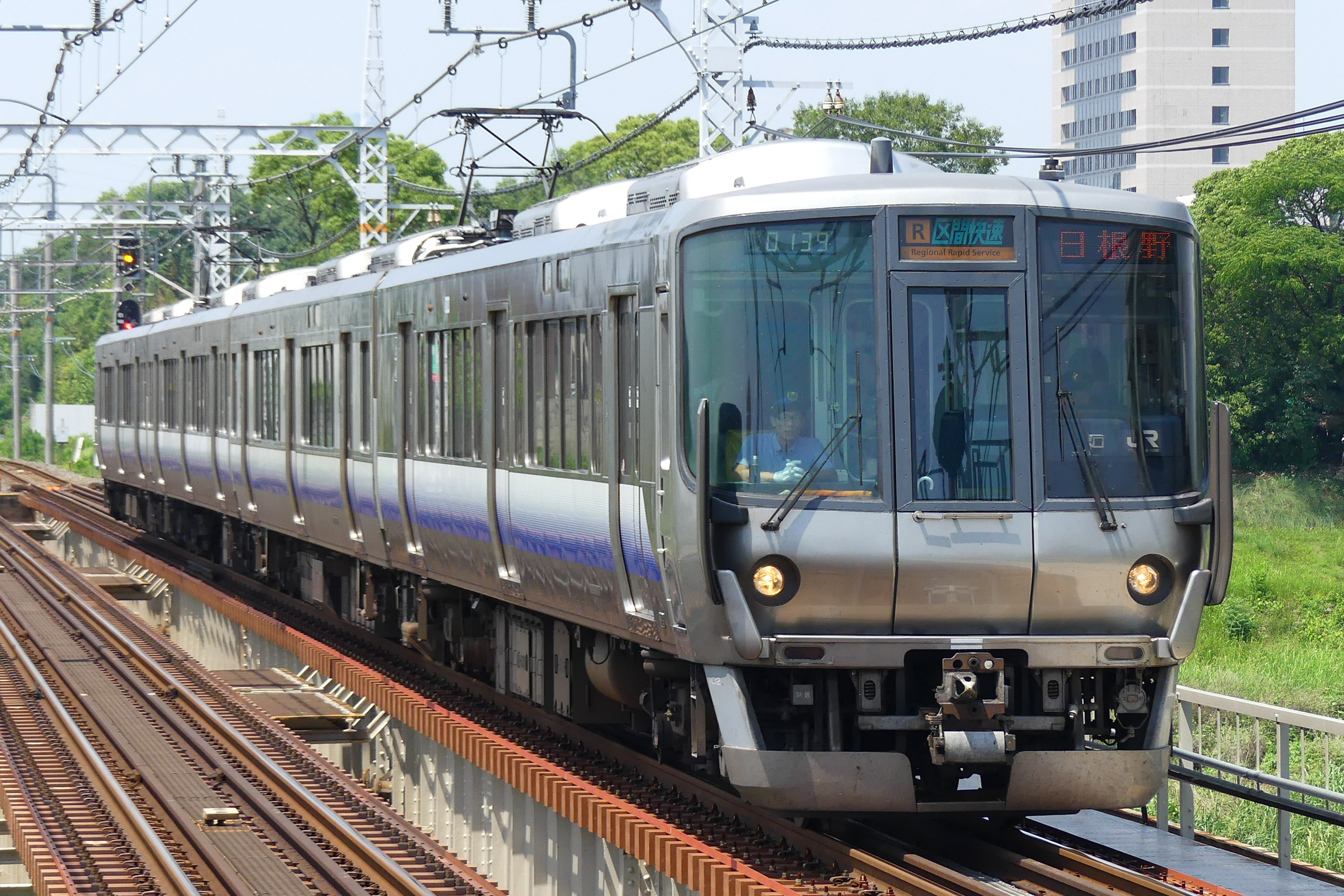
223-0 series set HE411, July 2017

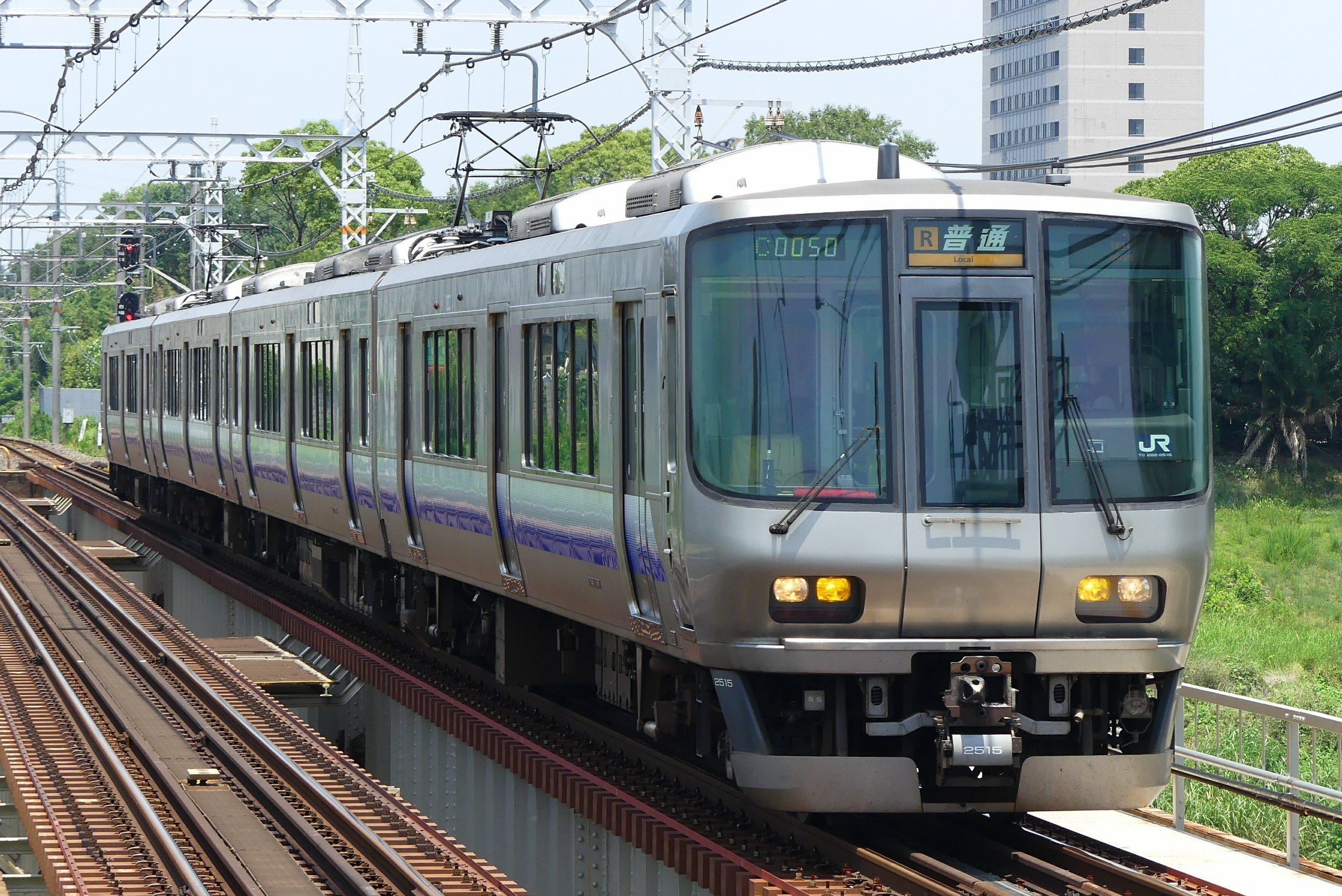
State before attaching the safety fence set HE431, July 2019

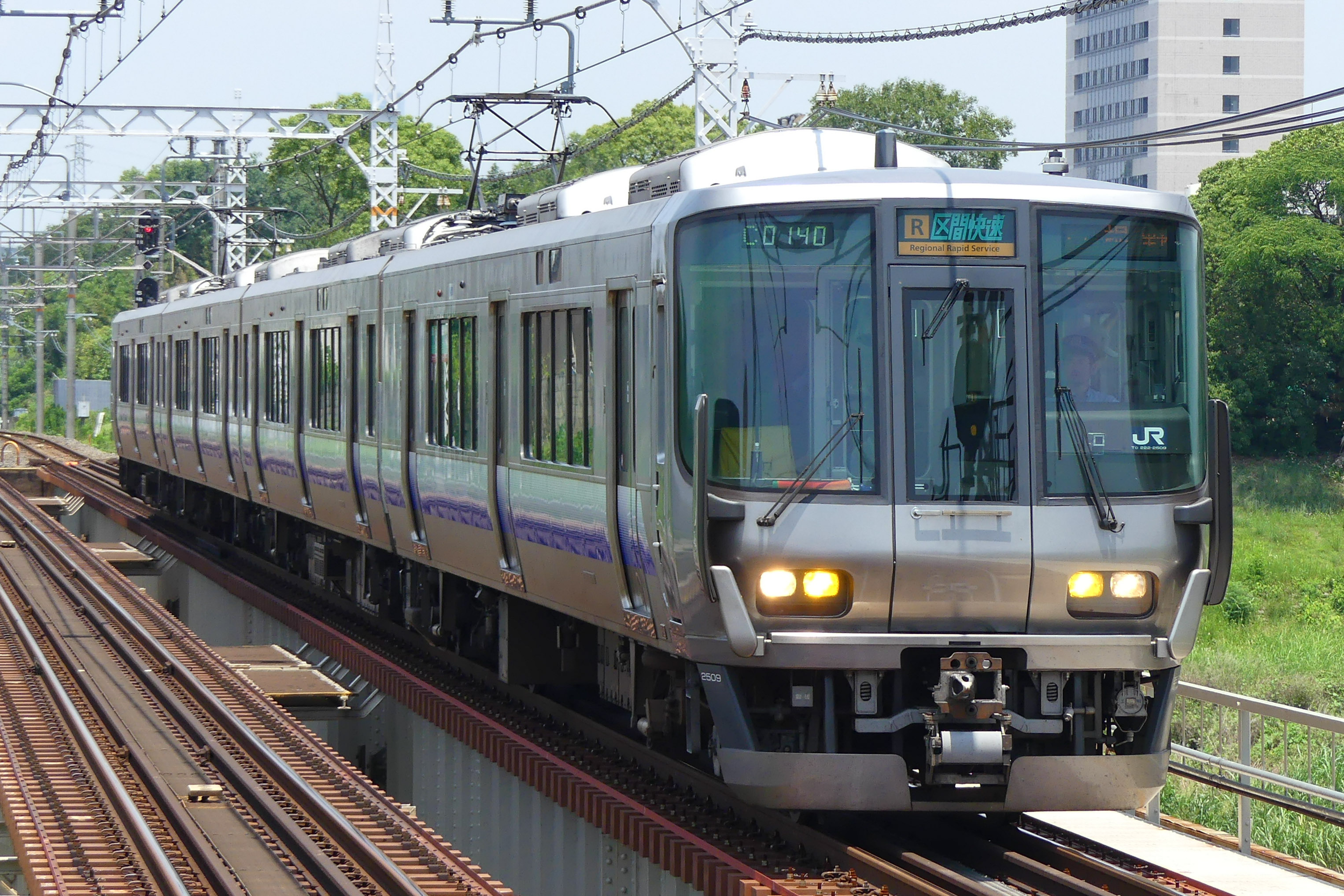
223-2500 series set HE425, July 2017

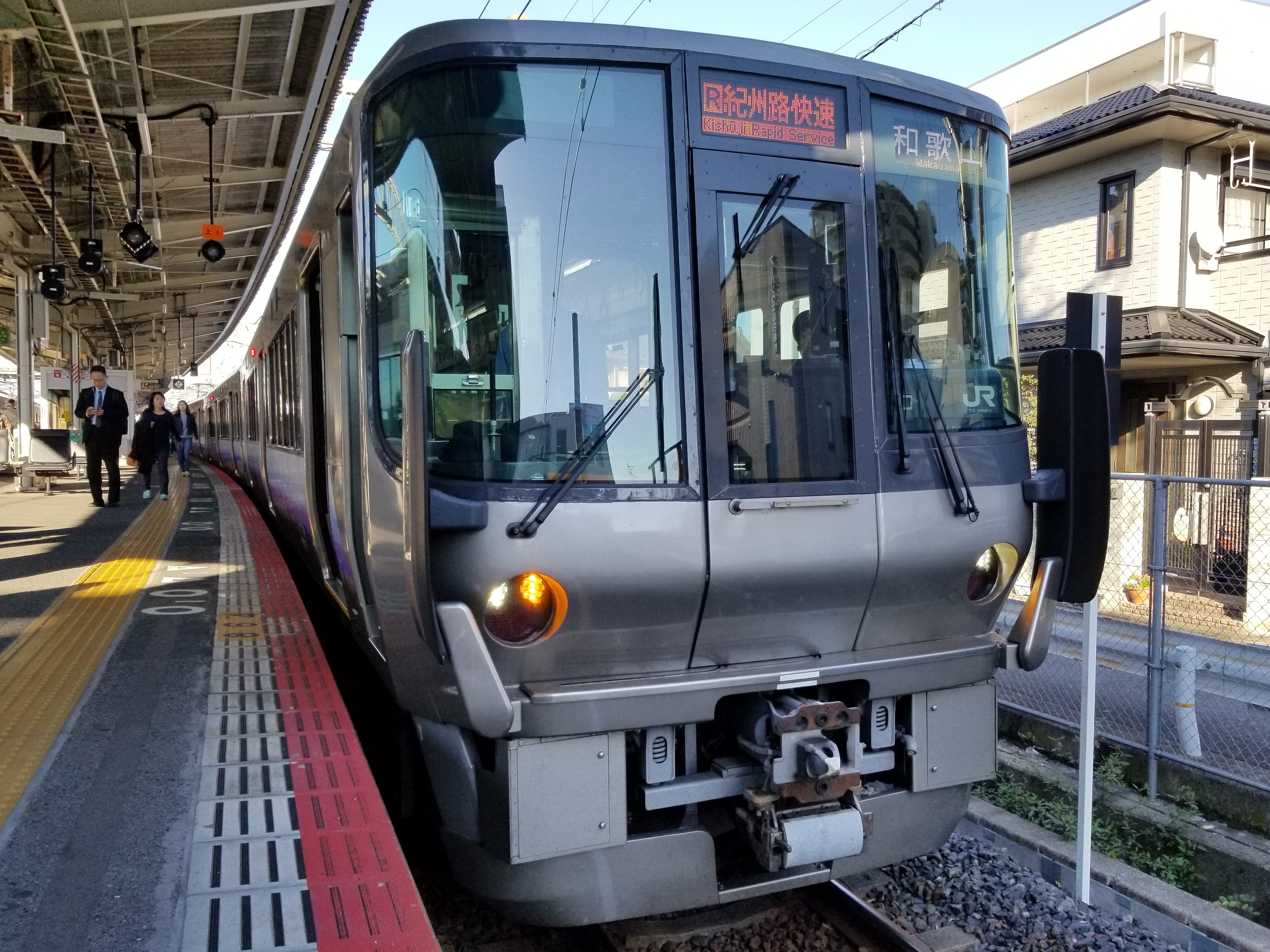
The first refurbished set, HE401, November 2018

=== 223-1000 series ===
This sub-series was manufactured in 1995, and were quickly pressed into service in the summer of the same year to curb dwindling passenger travel in the aftermath of the Great Hanshin earthquake, replacing older 221 series sets on Special Rapid services. The trains sport a higher top service speed of 130 km/h, and were manufactured jointly between Kinki Sharyo, Hitachi, and Kawasaki Heavy Industries. Fold-up seats replace some of the regular ones, in order to increase standing capacity during peak hours. To lower the center of gravity, air-conditioning units have been shifted to the bottom of the carriages.

The 223–1000 series is used on several routes: Hokuriku Main Line, Tōkaidō Main Line, Sanyō Main Line, Kosei Line, Kusatsu Line, and Sagano Line. A total of 92 cars were produced, and they are typically in 4- or 8-car formations.

In Q1 2019, selected 223-1000 end cars on 4-car sets underwent modifications to introduce the "A-Seat", a reserved seat service currently found on select 12-car Special Rapid Service trains. On these cars, straight blue stripes run along the sides of the car and the center door is permanently sealed. Seating is in a 2 + 2 configuration and WiFi is equipped along with power outlets.

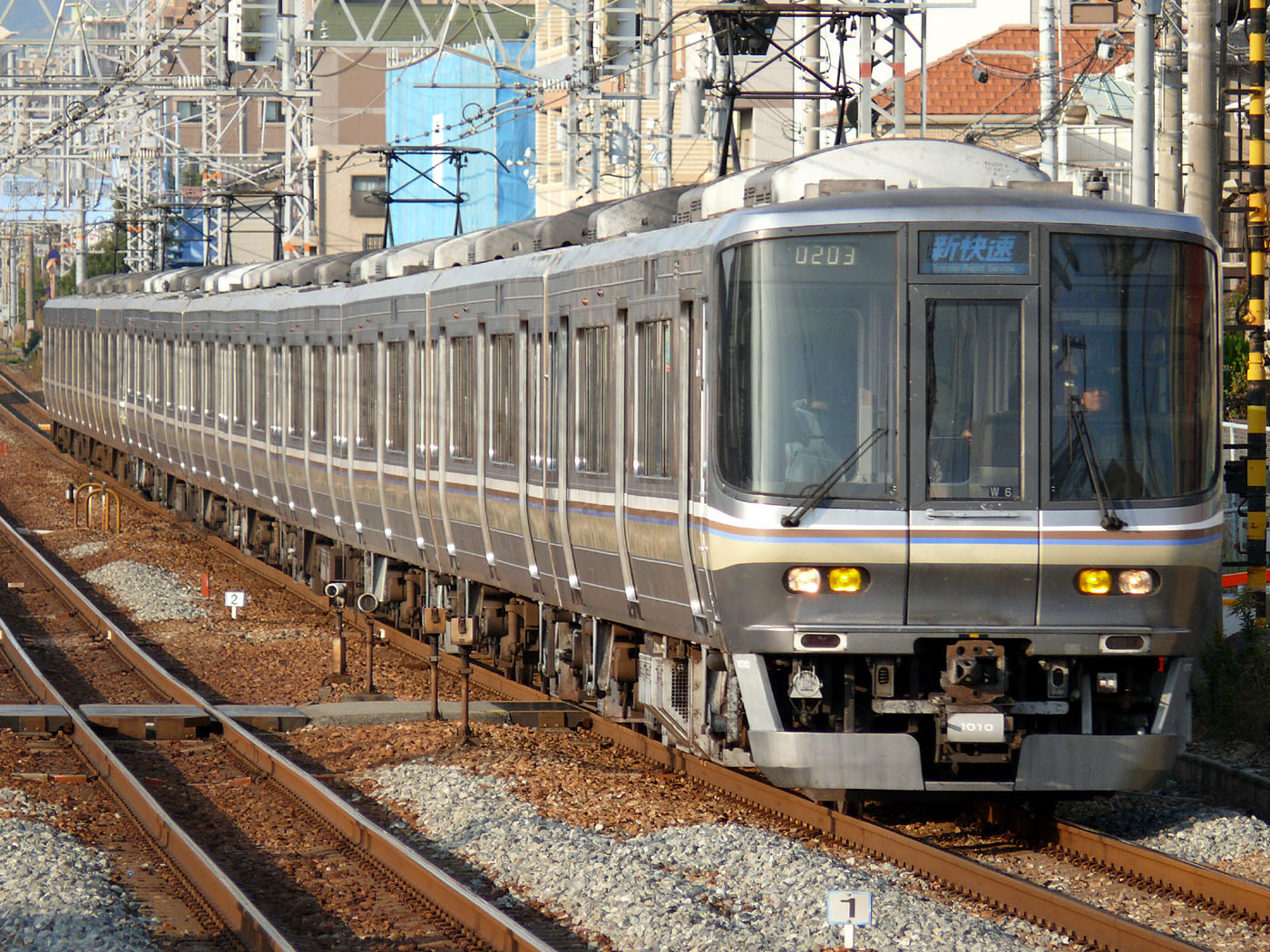
State before attaching the safety fence set W6, November 2007

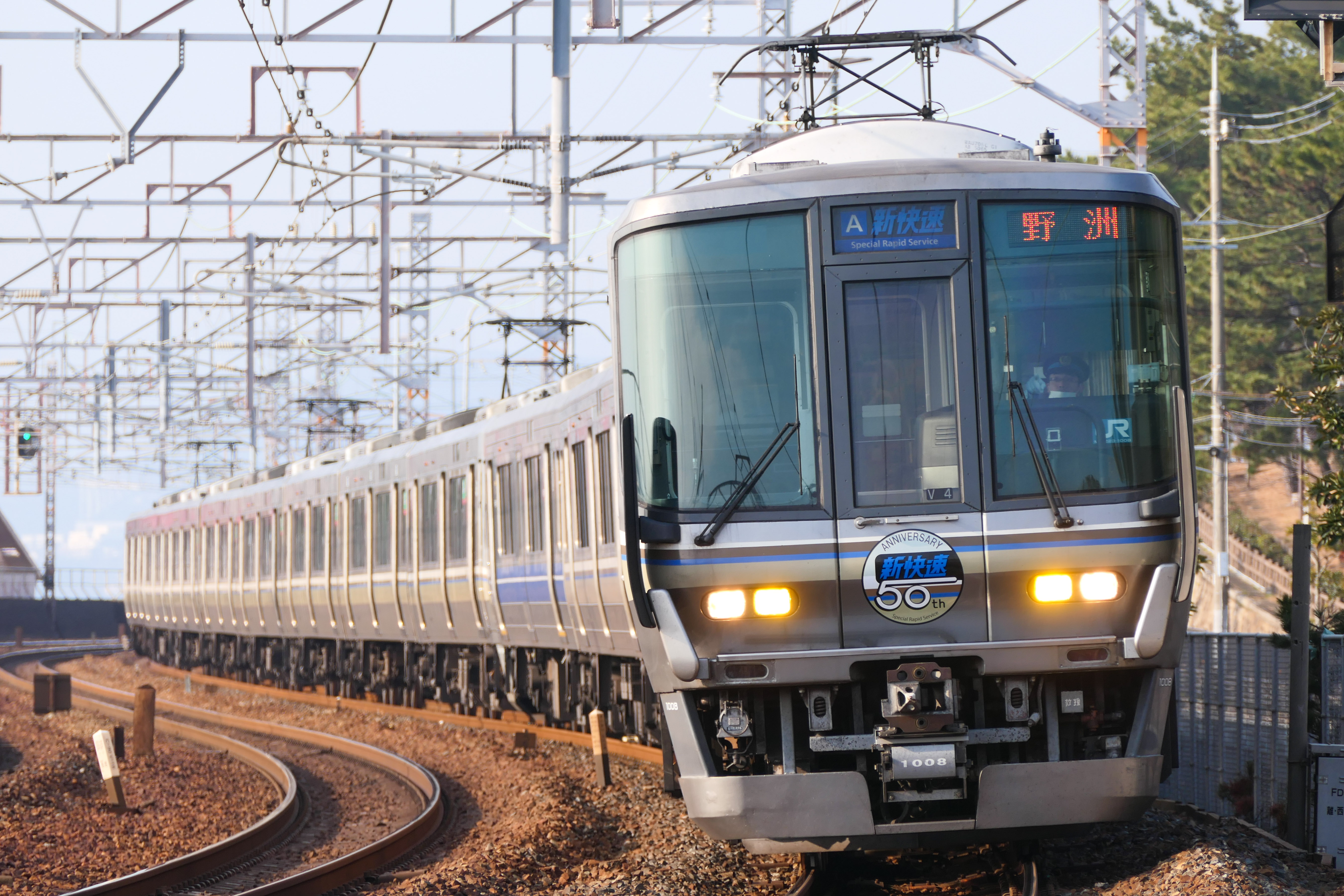
With safety fence attached 4-car set V4, January 2021

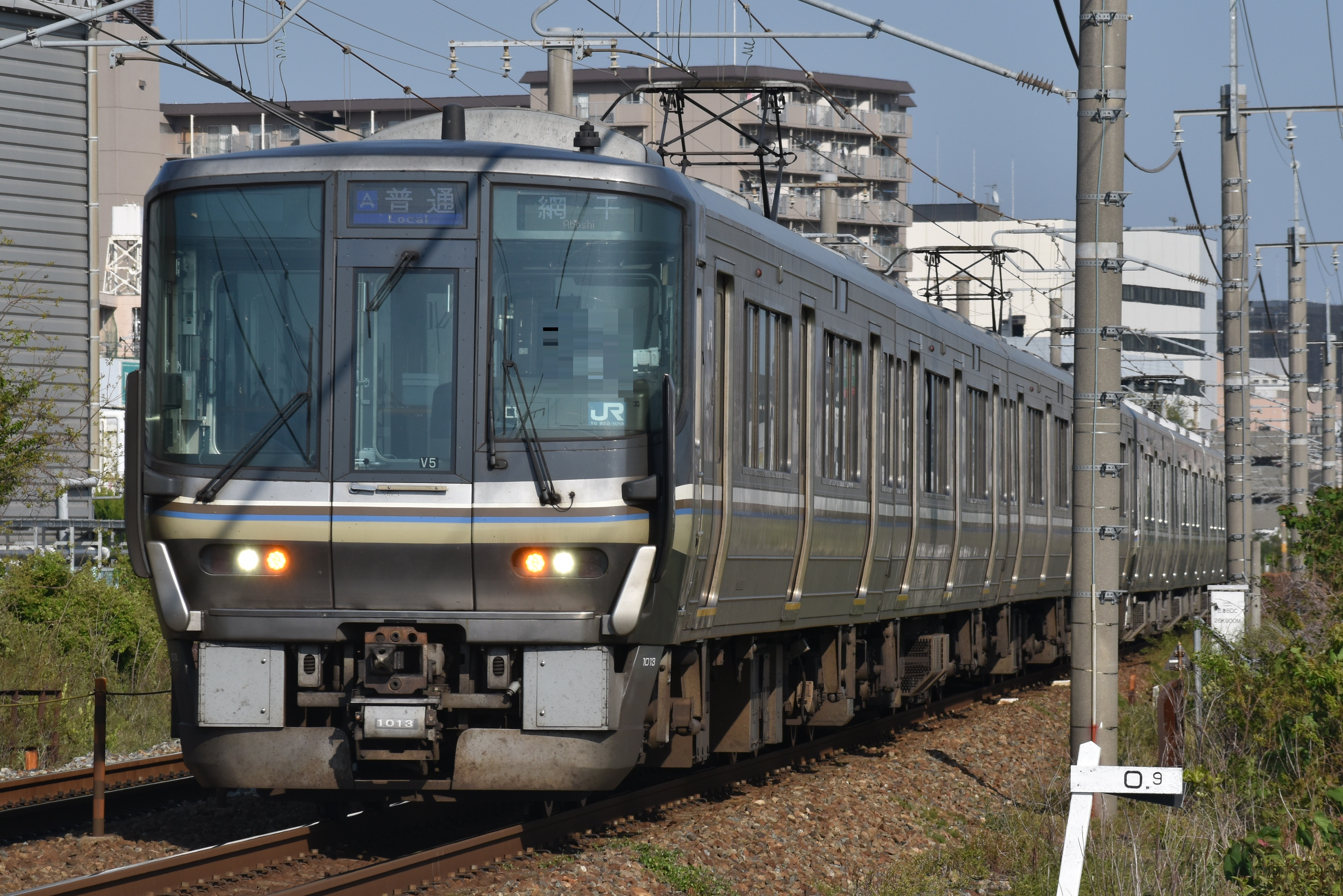
223-1000 series refurbished 4-car set V5, April 2021

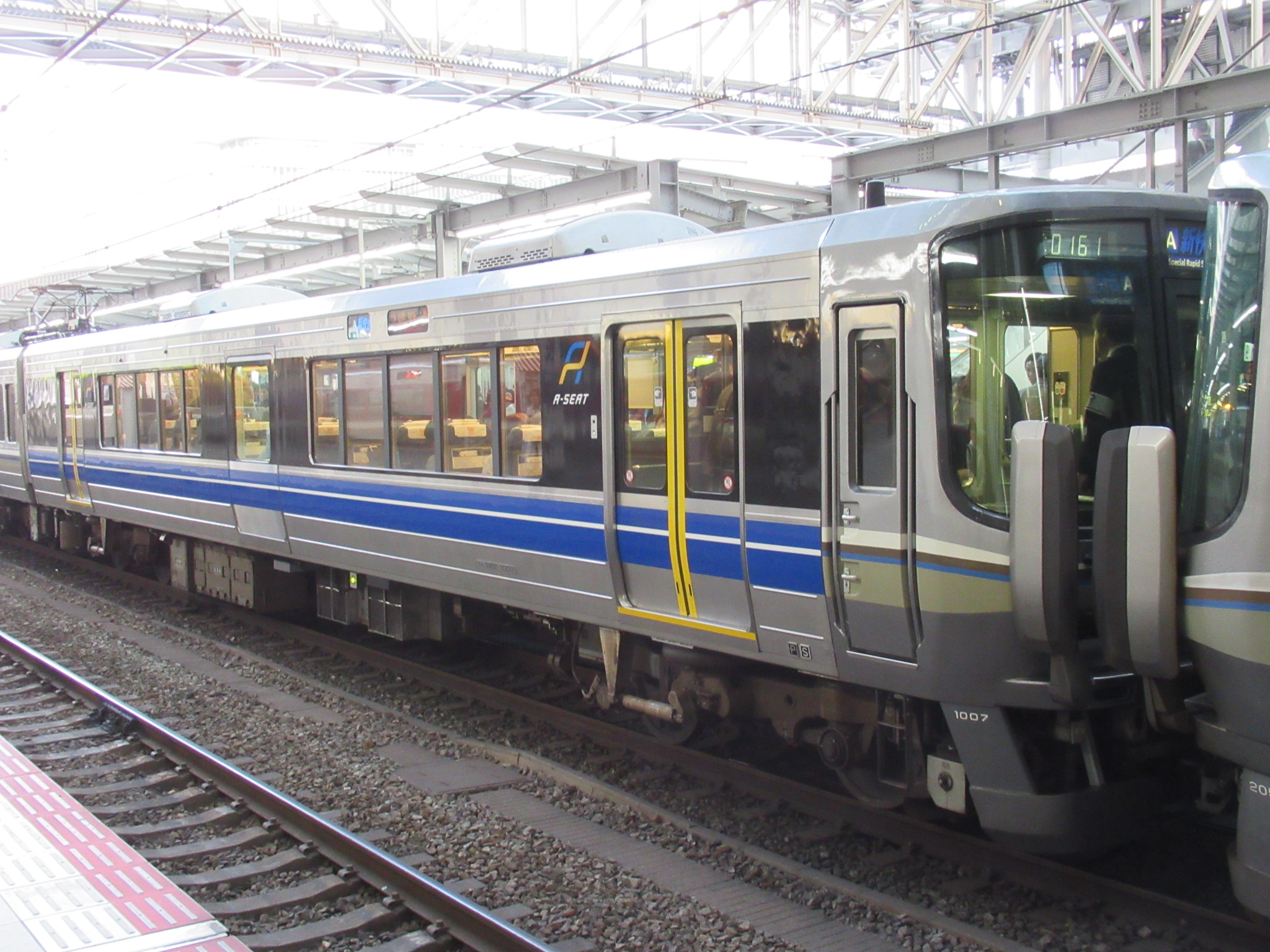
223-1000 series A-SEAT car, April 2019

=== 223-2000 series ===
In 1999, Kawasaki Heavy Industries and Kinki Sharyo received a further order of 236 cars. This sub-series was built with substantial improvements: for example universal access toilets and heat absorbent windows. Its formation and assignment of routes are similar to the 223-1000 model. 223 series set V8 was refurbished in Q1 2025, then re-entered service a few months after. It features LED headlights and full colour LED screens at the front of the train.

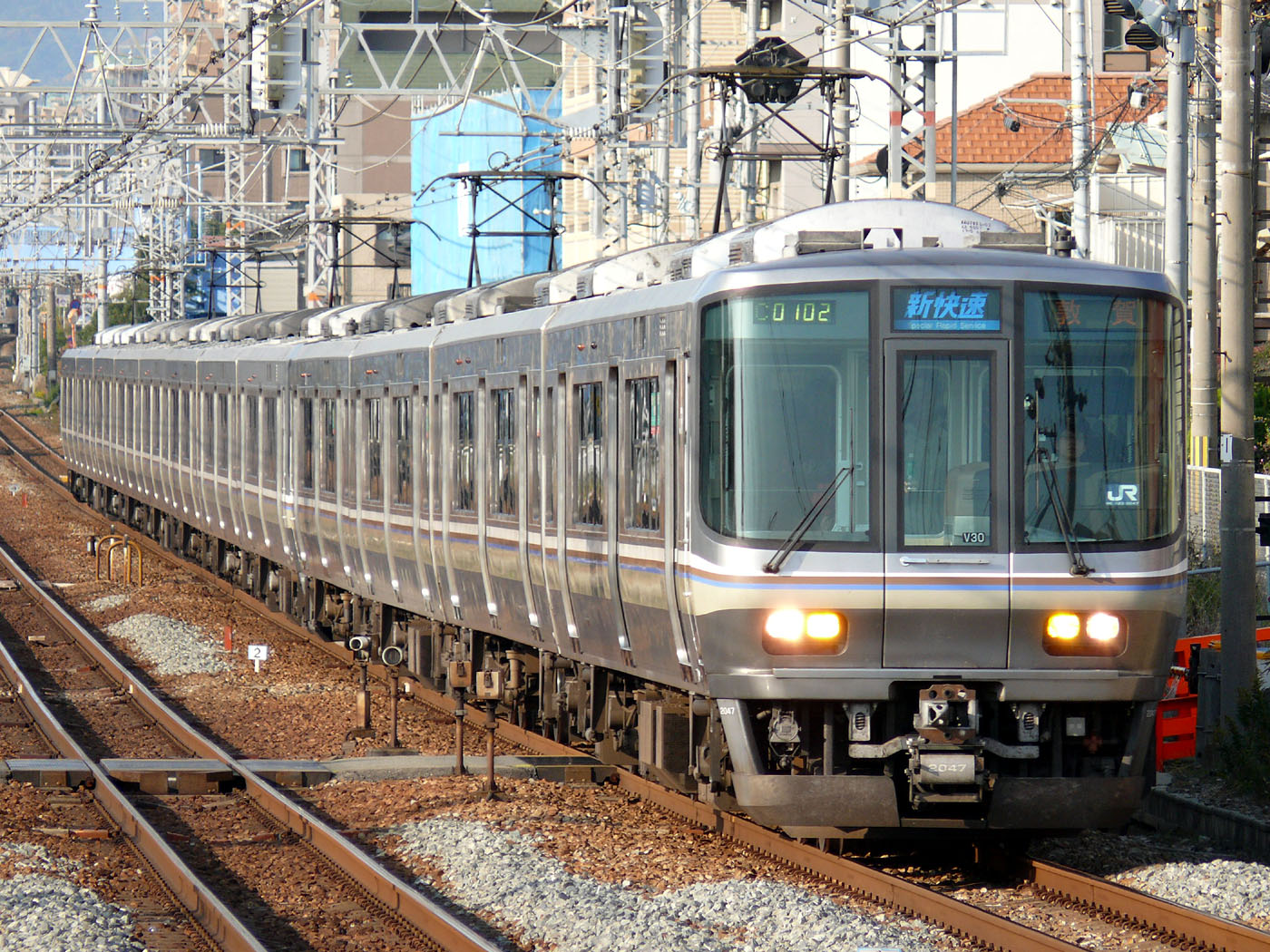
State before attaching the safety fence set W30, November 2007

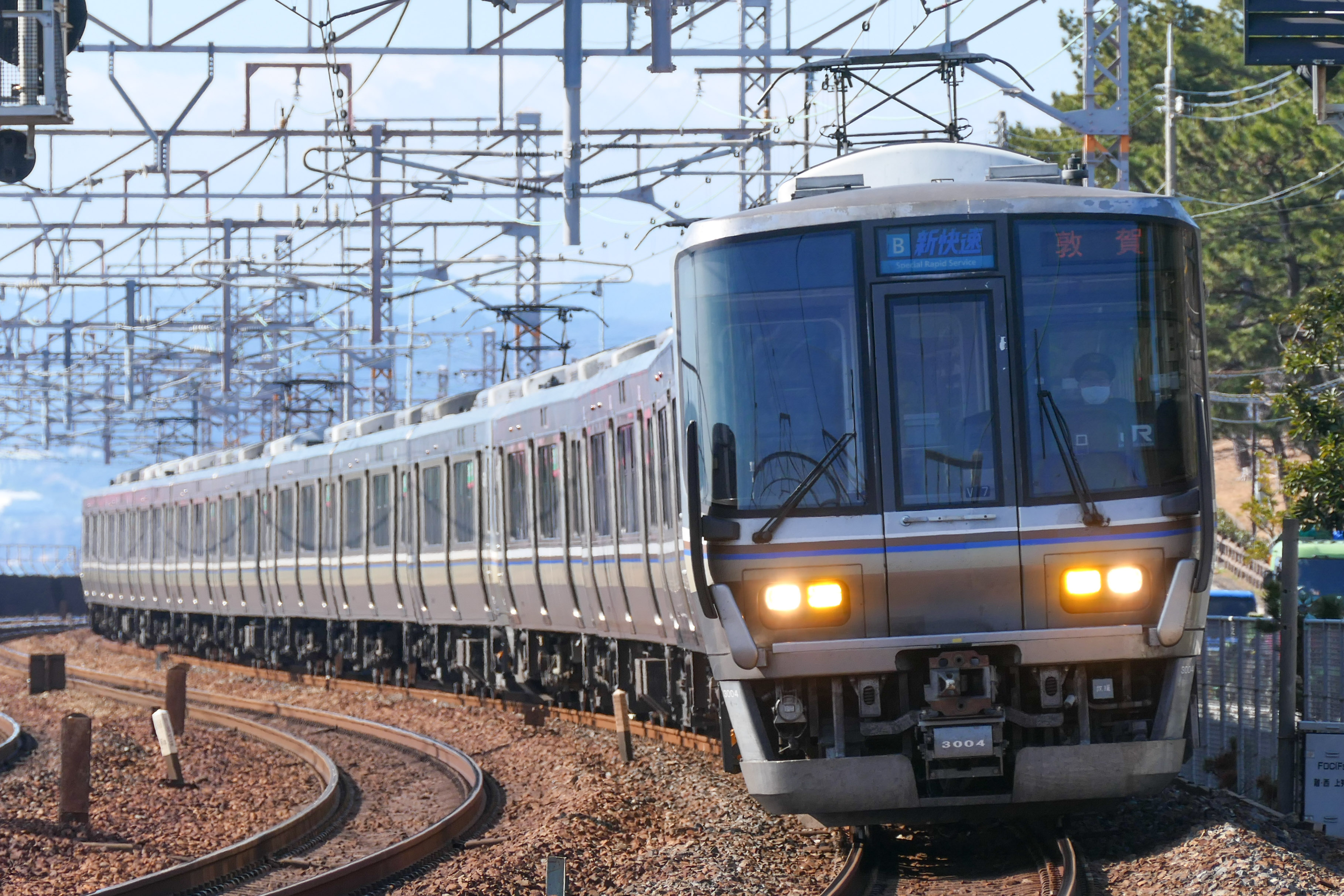
The prototype unit, 4-car set V7, 16 February 2021

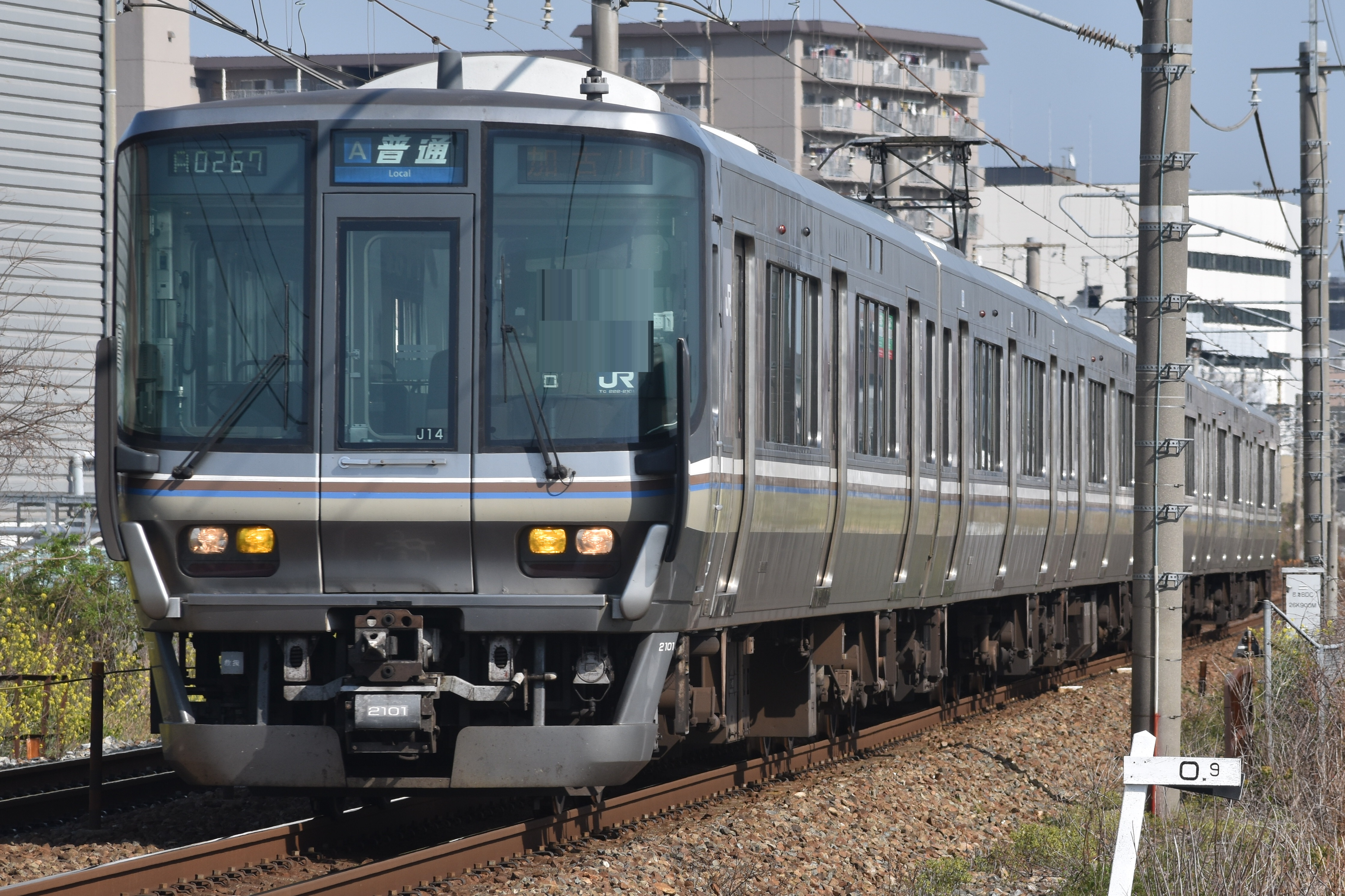
223-2000 series 6-car set J14, March 2021

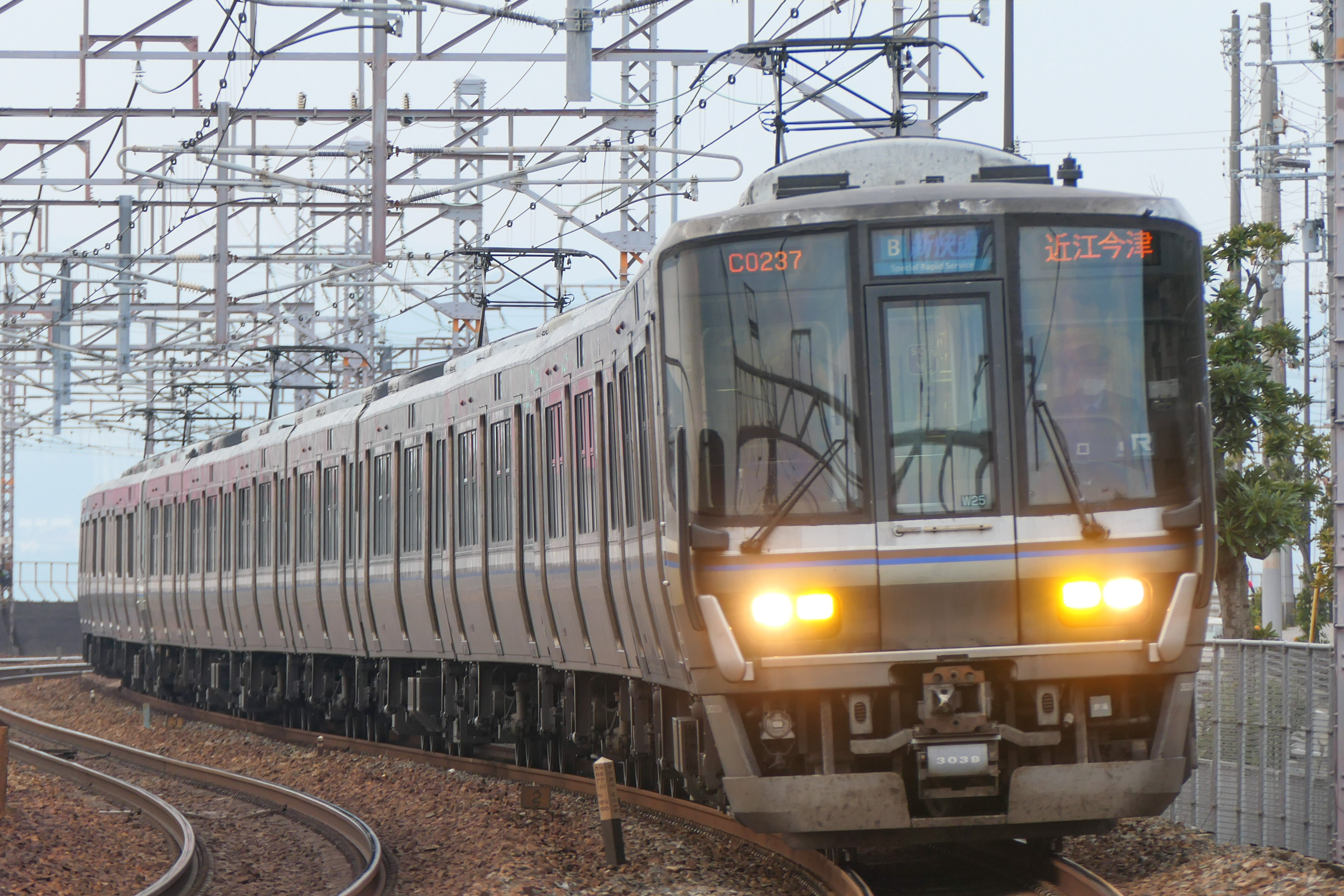
223-2000 series 8-car set W25, January 2021

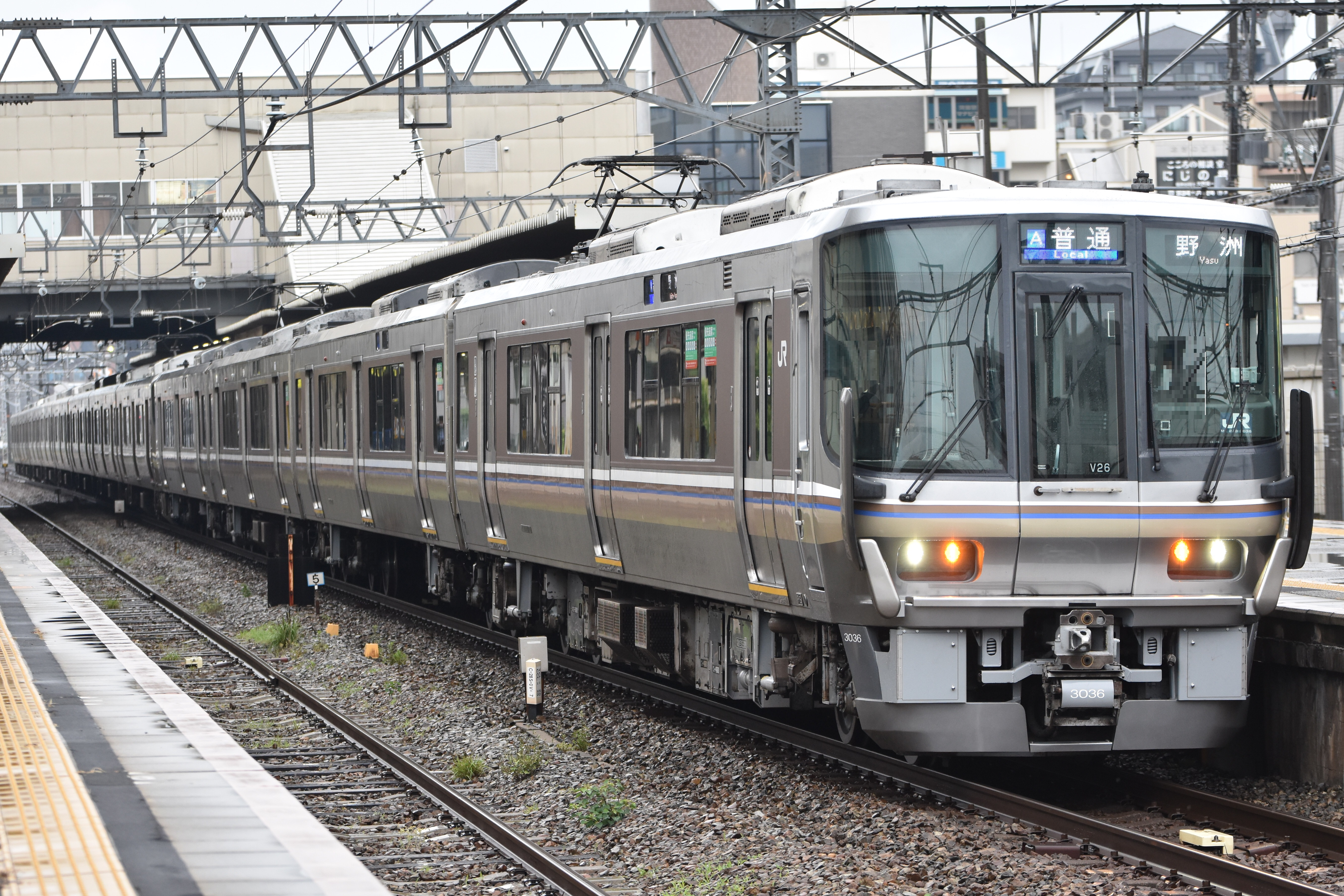
Refurbished 223-2000 series set V26, 14 June 2025

=== 223-5000 series ===
This sub-series was built in 2003 by Kawasaki Heavy Industries, intended to replace the aging 213 series operating on the Marine Liner services on the Seto-Ōhashi line. It can be coupled to the bi-level (double deck) JR Shikoku 5000 series, and ATS-P is not utilized. It was subsequently introduced on October 1 of the same year. JR-West classifies its sets as 223–5000, while JR Shikoku classifies its sets as 5000 series which were delivered as 3 car sets but subsequently reduced to two car sets (plus the bi-level reserved seat car).

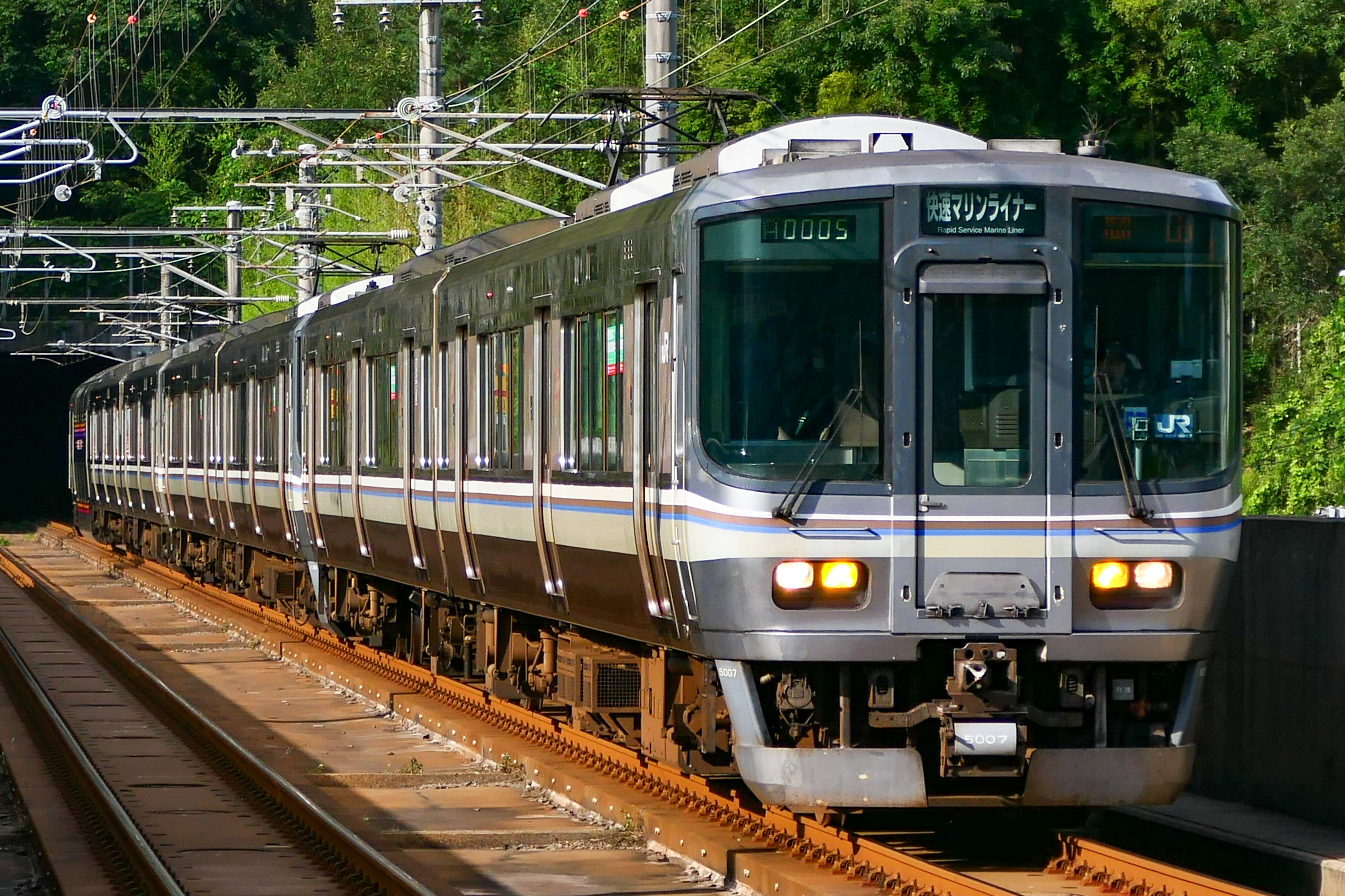
223-5000 series set P7, 18 July 2023

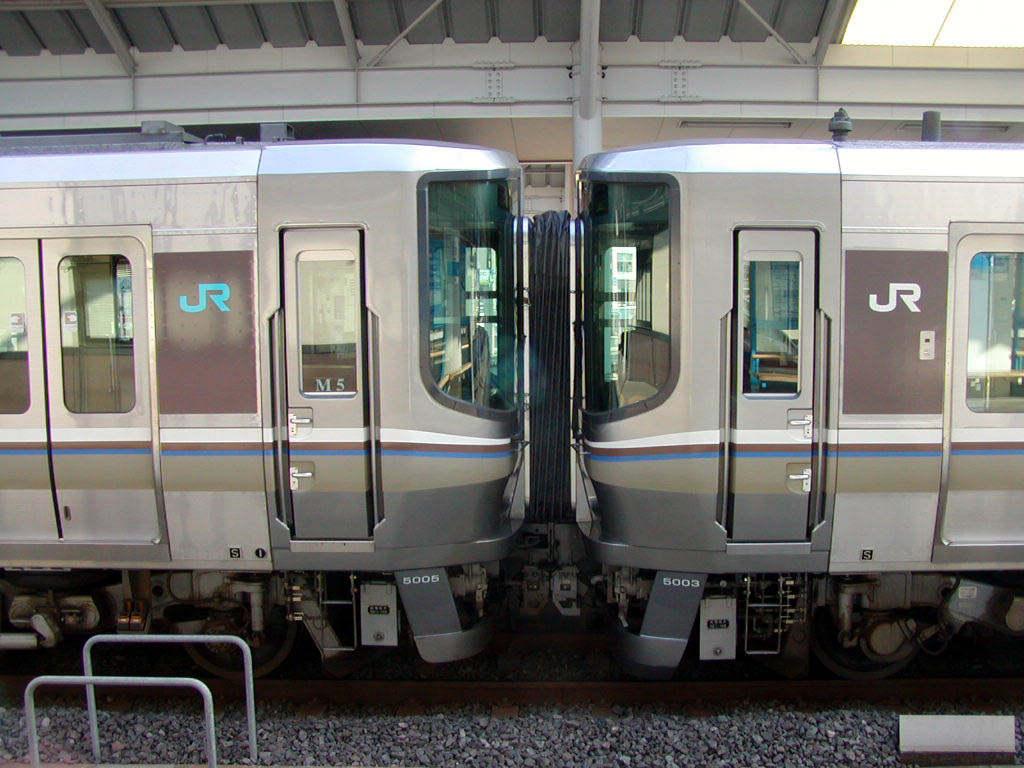
A 223–5000 series (right) coupled with a JR Shikoku 5000 series (left)

=== 223-5500 series ===
16 2-car sets were delivered in 2008, with the first sets entering service in July 2008. These sets are based at Fukuchiyama Depot, and are equipped for wanman driver-only-operation. Formation is KuMoHa223-5500 + KuHa222-5500.

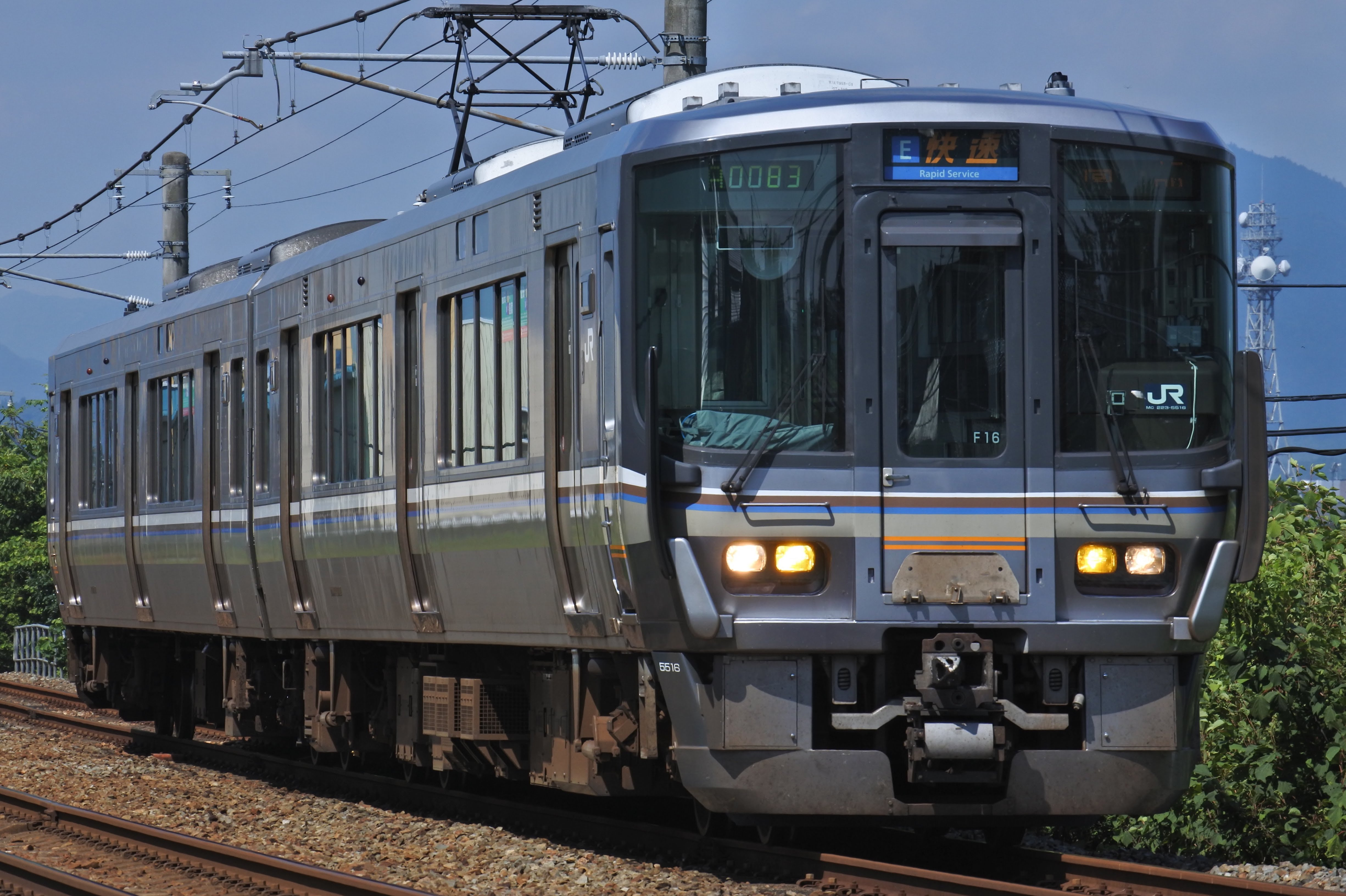
223-5500 series set F16, October 2019

=== 223-6000 series ===
This sub-series was created by modifying 223–2000 series sets with performance restricted to match that of 221 series sets. The first 4-car set (V25) was returned to service on 21 January 2008. These sets are distinguished by an orange stripe on the front gangway doors between the headlight clusters.

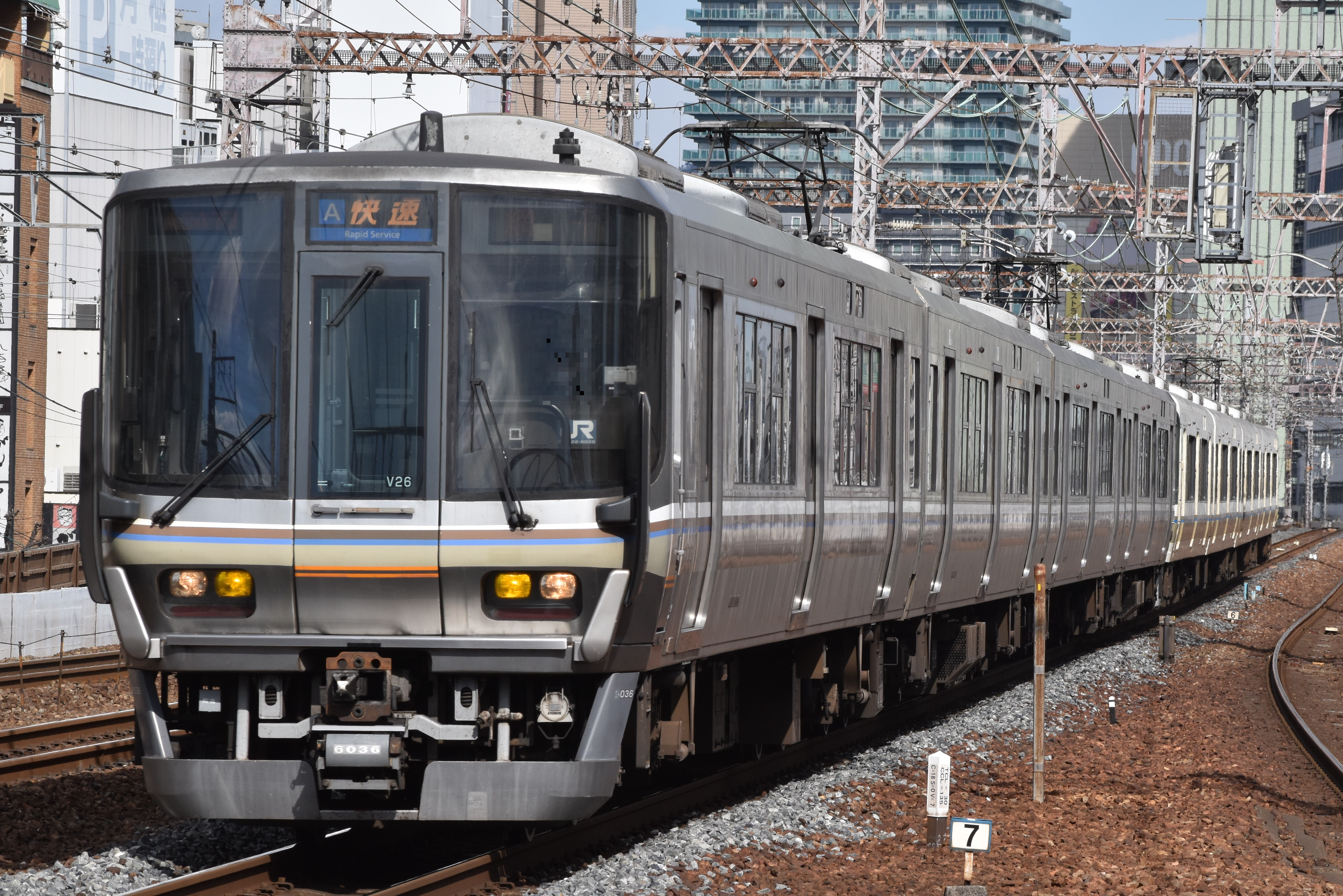
223-6000 series set V26 leading an 8-car consist

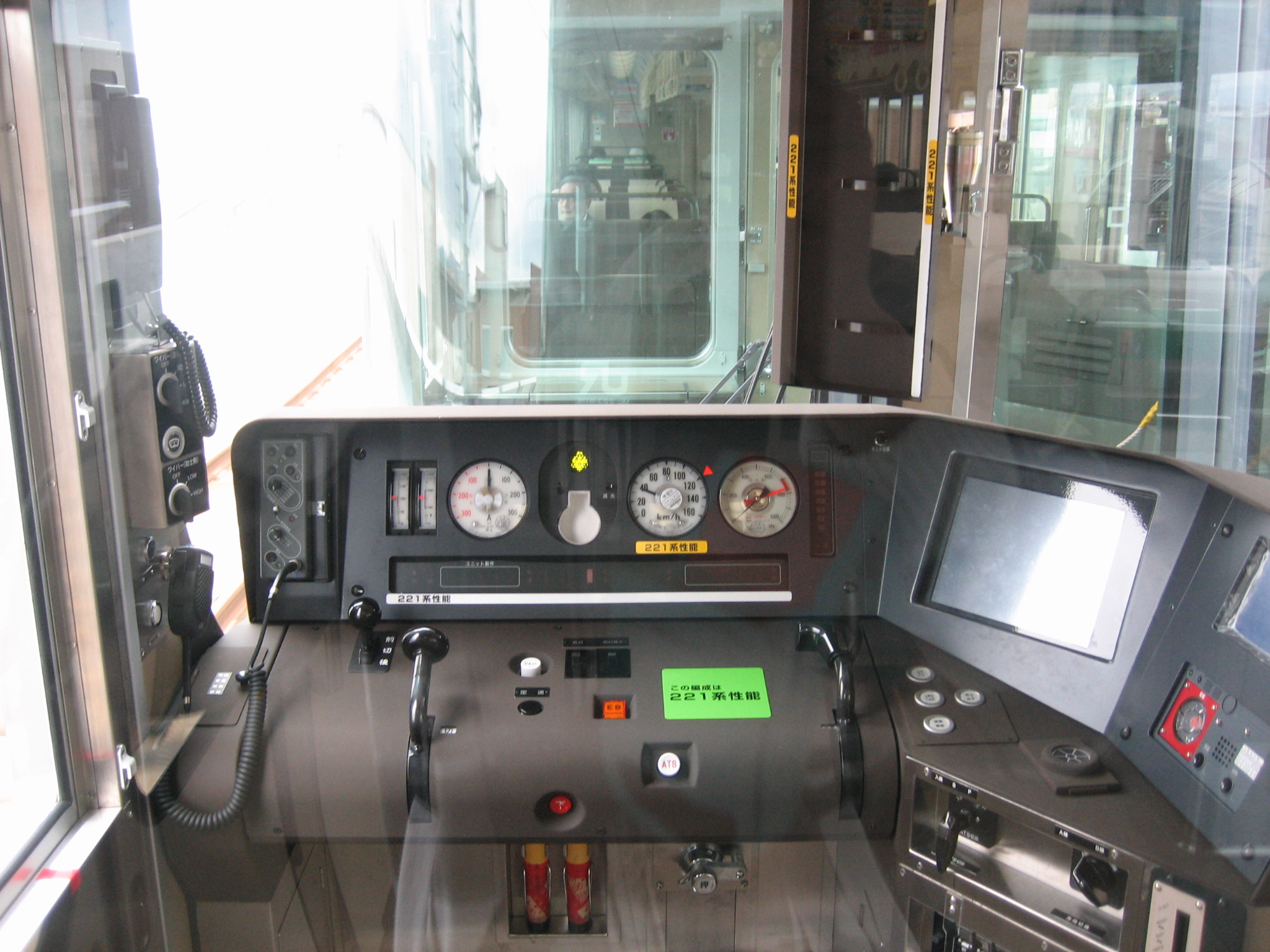
Driver's cab of a 223–6000 series

=== 223-9000 series (U@tech) ===
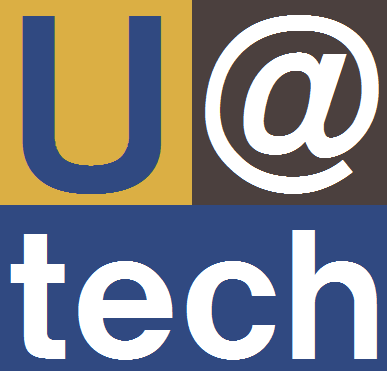
U@tech logo

In September 2004, JR-West unveiled the 3-car "U@tech" (you, Urban Network, ubiquitous, future + technology) experimental EMU converted from former Kawasaki Heavy Industries KuMoHa 223–9001, which was the prototype of the 223–2000 series and Seto-Ōhashi Line 213 series cars. This set was used to test and develop new technology for use on future narrow-gauge trains. It was based at Suita Depot and began testing on the JR Kyoto Line and JR Kobe Line from August 2004, and was withdrawn on 31 March 2019.

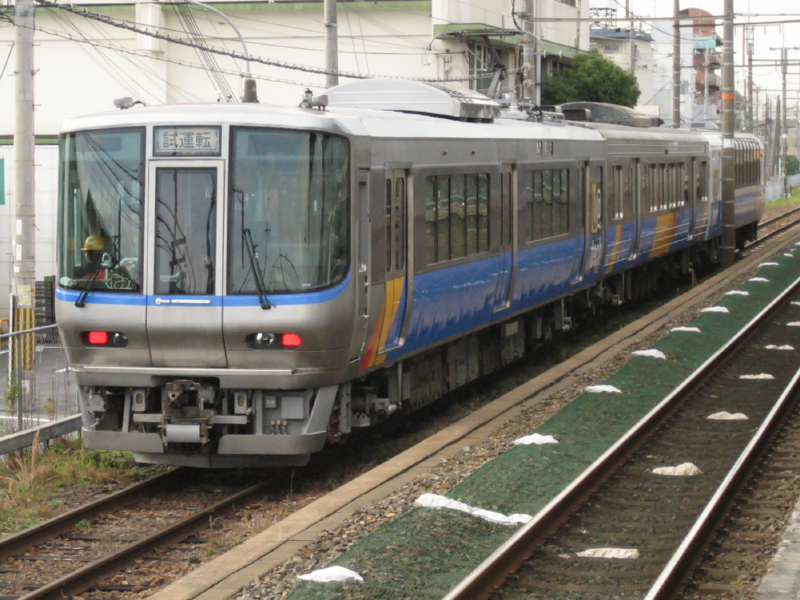
KuMoYa 223–9001

== Gallery ==
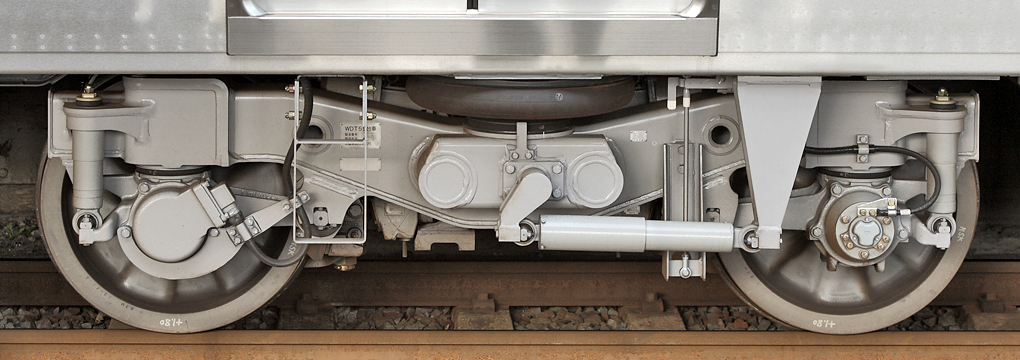
WDT59 powered bogie

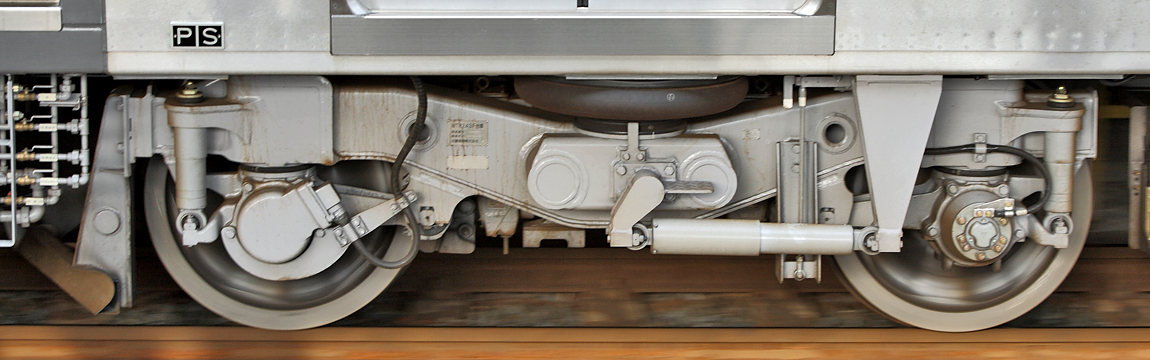
WTR243A trailer bogie

== Operations ==
=== JR-West ===
==== 223-0 series ====
- Osaka Loop Line
- Hanwa Line (through services from Kansai Airport Line)
- Kansai Airport Line
- Kisei Main Line (Kinokuni Line) (Wakayama - Susami or Kii-Tanabe)

==== 223-1000/2000 series ====
- Tōkaidō Main Line (Biwako Line, JR Kyoto Line, JR Kobe Line) (Maibara - Kōbe)
- Sanyō Main Line (JR Kobe Line) (Kōbe - Kamigōri)
- Hokuriku Main Line (Biwako Line) (Tsuruga - Maibara)
- Kosei Line (through services from Hokuriku Main Line)
- Kusatsu Line
- Akō Line (Aioi - Banshū-Akō)

==== 223-2500 (Hineno depot) series ====
- Osaka Loop Line
- Hanwa Line (through services from Kansai Airport Line)
- Kansai Airport Line
- Kisei Main Line (Kinokuni Line) (Wakayama - Susami or Kii-Tanabe)

==== 223-2500 (Kyoto depot) series ====
- Tōkaidō Main Line (Biwako Line) (Yamashina - Kyoto)
- Kosei Line (Yamashina - Nagahara)
- Sanin Main Line (Sagano Line) (Kyoto - Goma)

==== 223-5000 series ====
- Seto-Ōhashi Line (Marine Liner)
  - Uno Line (Okayama - Chayamachi)
  - Honshi-Bisan Line (Chayamachi - Kojima)

==== 223-5500 series ====
- Fukuchiyama Line (Sasayamaguchi - Fukuchiyama)
- Sanin Main Line (Sagano Line) (Kyoto - Kinosaki Onsen)
- Maizuru Line

==== 223-6000 (Aboshi depot) series ====
- Tōkaidō Main Line (Biwako Line, JR Kyoto Line, JR Kobe Line) (Maibara - Kōbe)
- Sanyō Main Line (JR Kobe Line) (Kōbe - Kamigōri)
- Bantan Line (Himeji - Teramae, sometimes substituted for 103 and 221 series)
- Akō Line (Aioi - Banshū-Akō)

==== 223-6000 (Miyahara depot) series ====
- Tōkaidō Main Line (JR Kobe Line) (Ōsaka - Amagasaki)
- Fukuchiyama Line (JR Takarazuka Line) (Amagasaki - Sasayamaguchi or Fukuchiyama)

==== 223-6000 (Kyoto depot) series ====
- Tōkaidō Main Line (Biwako Line) (Kyoto - Yamashina)
- Kosei Line (Yamashina - Nagahara)
- Sanin Main Line (Sagano Line) (Kyoto - Goma)

=== JR Shikoku ===
==== 223-5000 series ====
- Seto-Ōhashi Line (Marine Liner)
  - Honshi-Bisan Line (Kojima - Utazu)
  - Yosan Line (Utazu - Takamatsu)

== Formations ==
=== 223-0, 223-2500 series ===
==== 4-car sets (HE prefix) ====
Car No.	1	2	3	4
Designation	T'c	M	T	Mc
Numbering	KuHa 222-0	MoHa 223-0	SaHa 223-100	KuMoHa 223–0
Designation	T'c	M	T	Mc
Numbering	KuHa 222-2500	MoHa 223-2500	SaHa 223-2500	KuMoHa 223–2500
Designation	T'c1	M	T	Mc1
Numbering	KuHa 222-100	MoHa 223-2500	SaHa 223-0	KuMoHa 223–100
Designation	T'c	M	T	Mc
Numbering	KuHa 222-2500	MoHa 223-2500	SaHa 223-0	KuMoHa 223–2500

The KuMoHa 223 and MoHa 223 cars are each fitted with one scissors-type pantograph.

=== 223-1000 series ===
==== 8-car sets (W prefix) ====
Car No.	1	2	3	4	5	6	7	8
Designation	T'c	M	T	T	M	T	T	Mc
Numbering	KuHa 222-1000	MoHa 223-1000	SaHa 223–1000	SaHa 223-1000	MoHa 223-1000	SaHa 223–1000	SaHa 223-1000	KuMoHa 223–1000

==== 4-car sets (V prefix) ====
Car No.	1	2	3	4
Designation	T'c	M	T	Mc
Numbering	KuHa 222-1000	MoHa 223-1000	SaHa 223-1000	KuMoHa 223–1000

The KuMoHa 223 and MoHa 223 cars are each fitted with one scissors-type pantograph.

=== 223-2000 series ===
==== 8-car sets (W prefix) ====
Car No.	1	2	3	4	5	6	7	8
Designation	T'c	M	T	T	M'	T	T	Mc3
Numbering	KuHa 222-2000	MoHa 223-2000	SaHa 223–2000	SaHa 223-2000	MoHa 222-2000	SaHa 223–2000	SaHa 223-2000	KuMoHa 223–3000
Designation	T'c	M	T	T	M1	T	T	Mc
Numbering	KuHa 222-2000	MoHa 223-2000	SaHa 223–2000	SaHa 223-2000	MoHa 223-2100	SaHa 223–2000	SaHa 223-2000	KuMoHa 223–2000

==== 6-car sets (J prefix) ====
Car No.	1	2	3	4	5	6
Designation	T'c	T	M	T	T	Mc
Numbering	KuHa 222-2000	SaHa 223-2000	MoHa 223-2000	SaHa 223–2000	SaHa 223-2000	KuMoHa 223–2000

==== 4-car sets (V prefix) ====
Car No.	1	2	3	4
Designation	T'c	M'3	T	Mc3
Numbering	KuHa 222-2000	MoHa 222-3000	SaHa 223-2000	KuMoHa 223–3000
Designation	T'c	M1	T	Mc
Numbering	KuHa 222-2000	MoHa 223-2100	SaHa 223-2000	KuMoHa 223–2000

The KuMoHa 223 and MoHa 223/222 cars are each fitted with one scissors-type pantograph.

=== 223-5000 series ===
==== 2-car sets (P prefix) ====
Car No.	1	2
Designation	T'c	Mc
Numbering	KuHa 222-5000	KuMoHa 223–5000

The KuMoHa 223 cars are each fitted with one scissors-type pantograph.

=== 223-5500 series ===
==== 2-car sets (F prefix) ====
Car No.	1	2
Designation	T'c	Mc
Numbering	KuHa 222-5500	KuMoHa 223–5500

The KuMoHa 223-5501/5502/5503/5504/5509 cars are equipped with a second de-icing pantograph.

=== 223-6000 series ===
==== 4-car Aboshi depot sets (CV prefix) ====
Car No.	1	2	3	4
Designation	T'c	M'3	T	Mc3
Numbering	KuHa 222-6000	MoHa 222-7000	SaHa 223-6000	KuMoHa 223–7000

The KuMoHa 223 and MoHa 222 cars are each fitted with one scissors-type pantograph.

==== 4-car Miyahara depot sets (MA prefix) ====
Car No.	1	2	3	4
Designation	T'c	M1	T	Mc
Numbering	KuHa 222-6000	MoHa 223-6100	SaHa 223-6000	KuMoHa 223–6000

The KuMoHa 223 and MoHa 223 cars are each fitted with two scissors-type pantograph.

==== 4-car Kyoto depot sets (R prefix) ====
Car No.	1	2	3	4
Designation	T'c	M1	T	Mc
Numbering	KuHa 222-6000	MoHa 222-6000	SaHa 223-6000	KuMoHa 223–6000

The KuMoHa 223 and MoHa 222 cars are each fitted with one scissors-type pantograph.

=== 223-9000 series (U@tech) ===
Car No.	1	2	3
Designation	T'zc	Tz	Mzc
Numbering	KuYa 212-1	SaYa 213-1	KuMoYa 223–9001

The KuMoYa 223 end car was fitted with one single-arm pantograph.

== Interior ==
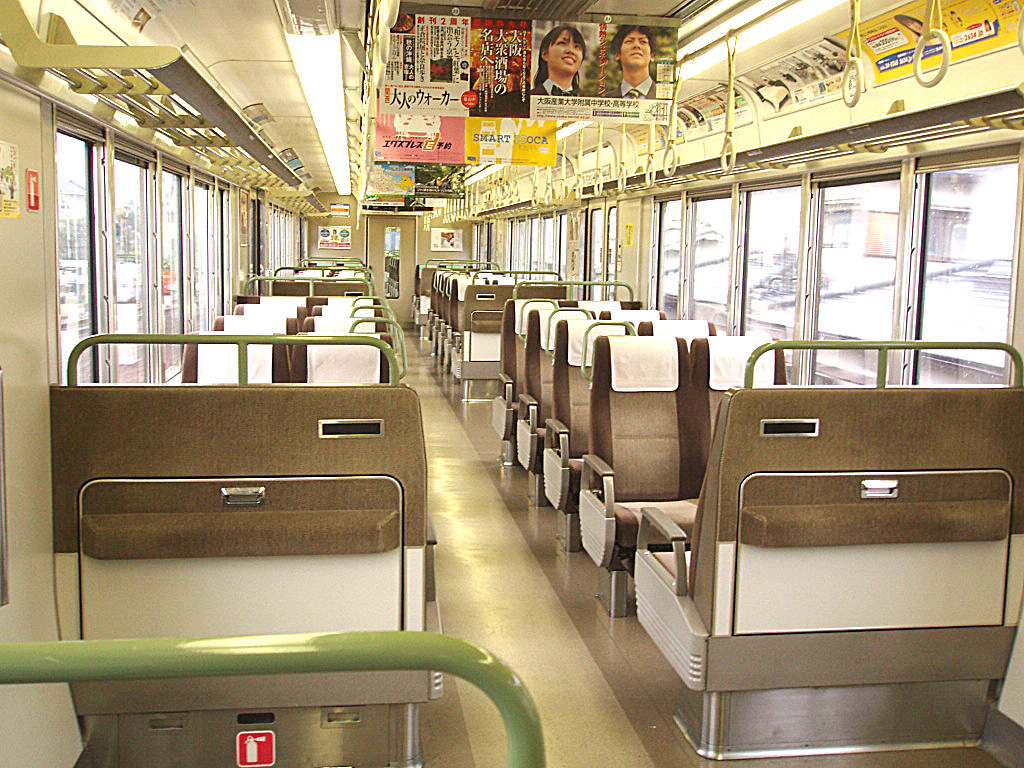
Interior view of 223–1000 series

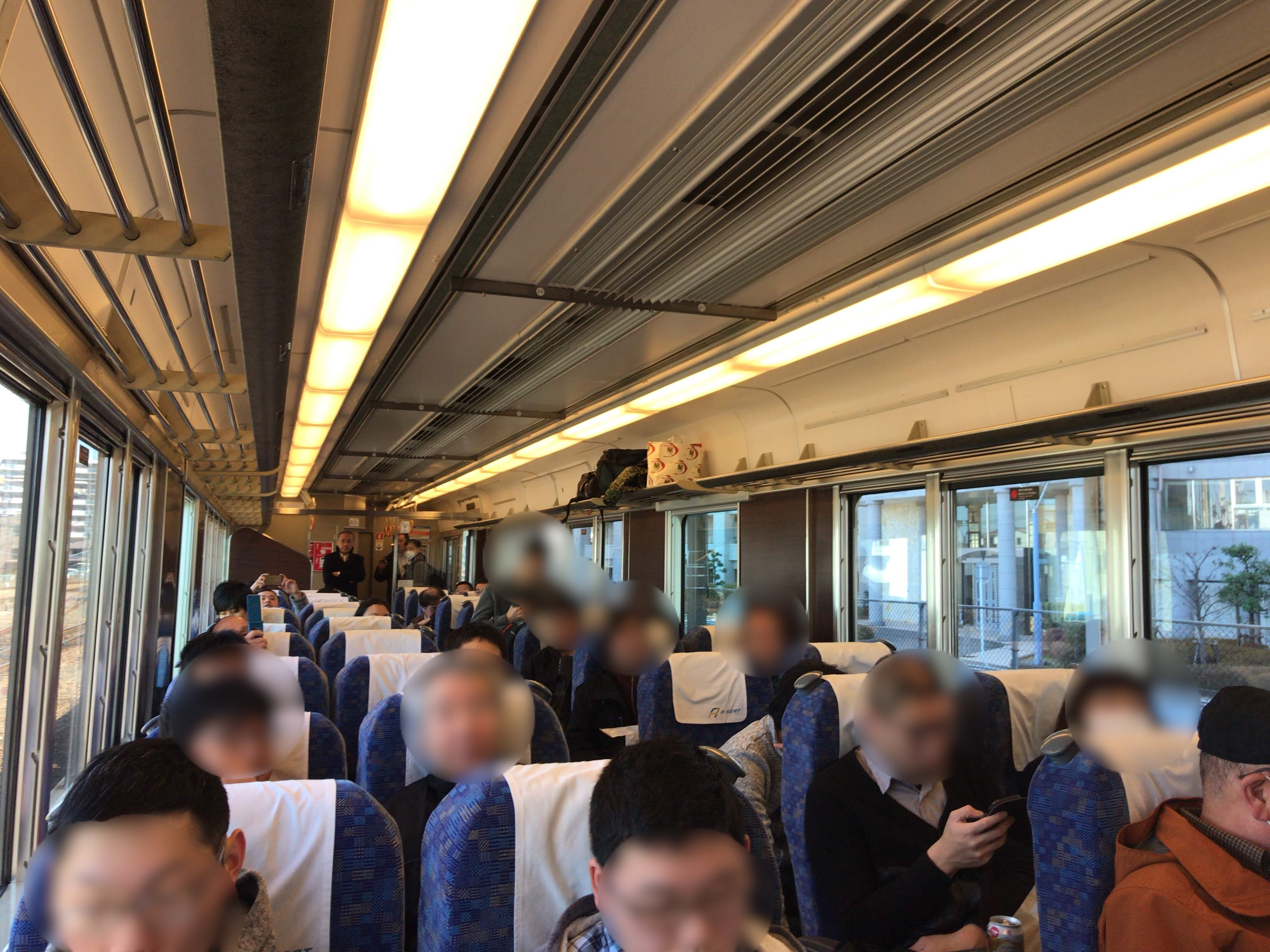
Interior view of 223–1000 series A-SEAT car

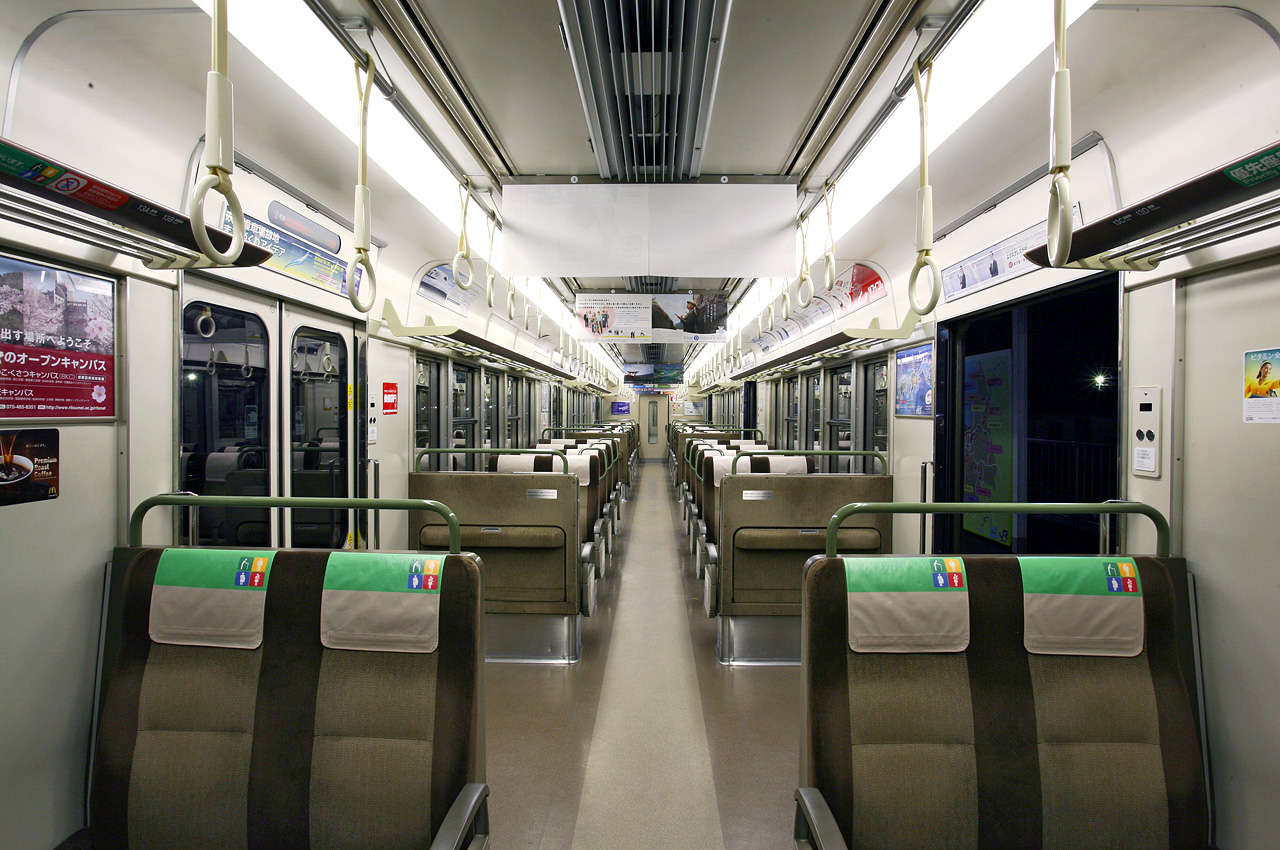
Interior view of 223–2000 series

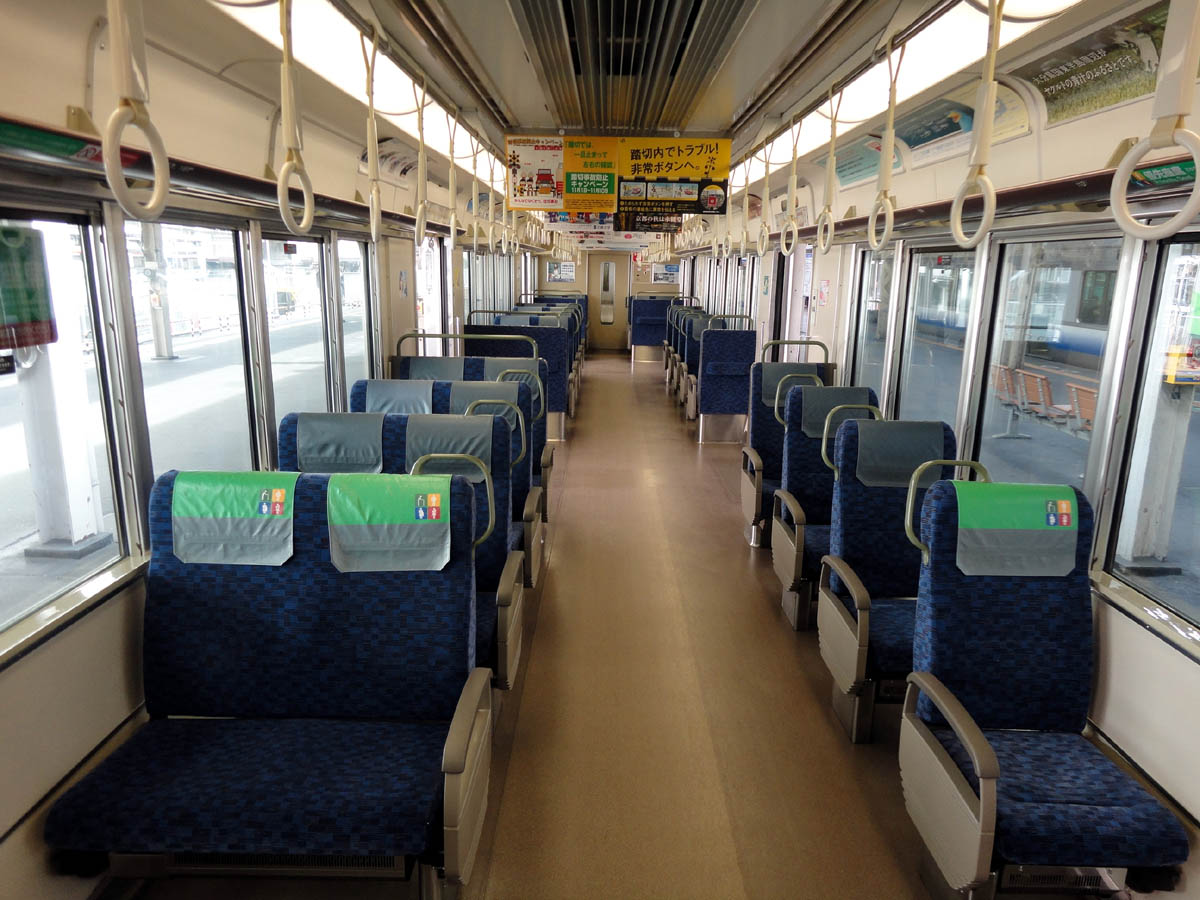
Interior view of 223–2500 series

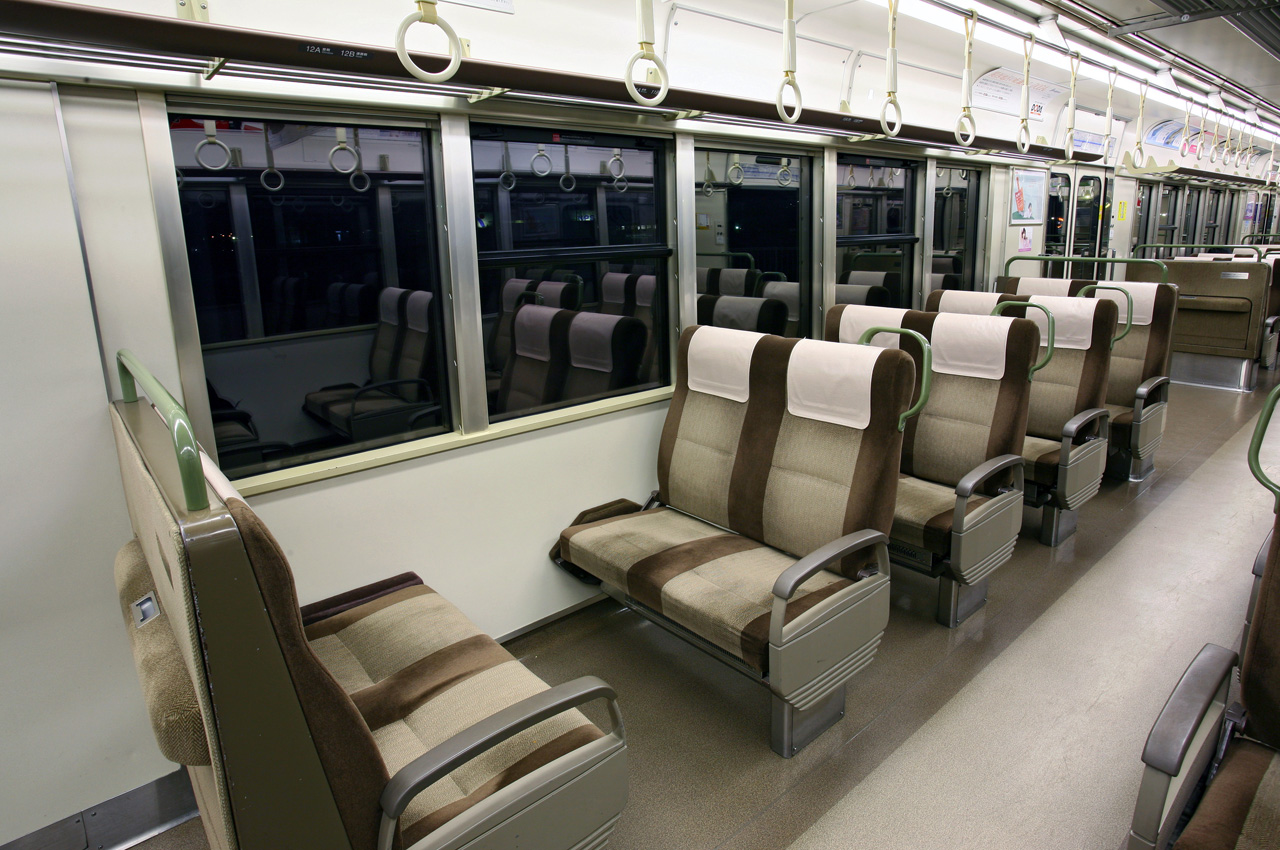
2-abreast flip-over seats

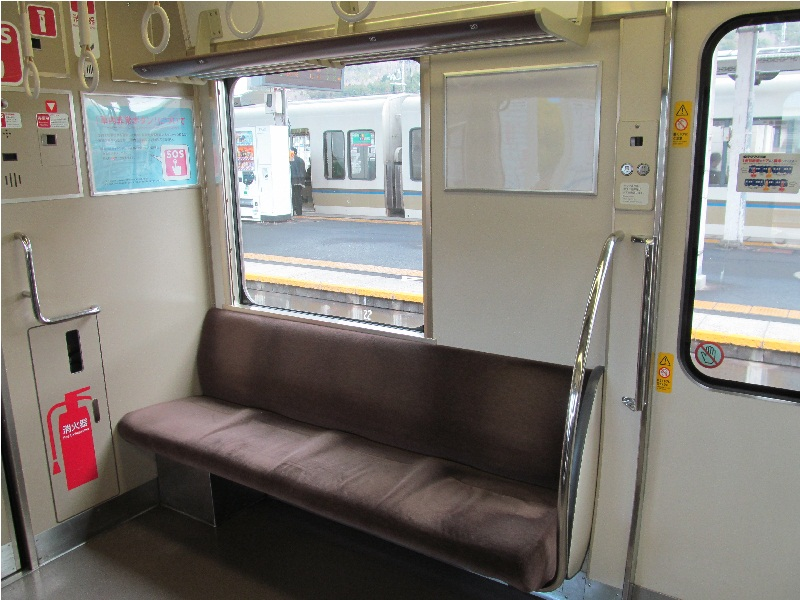
223-5500 series longitudinal seating

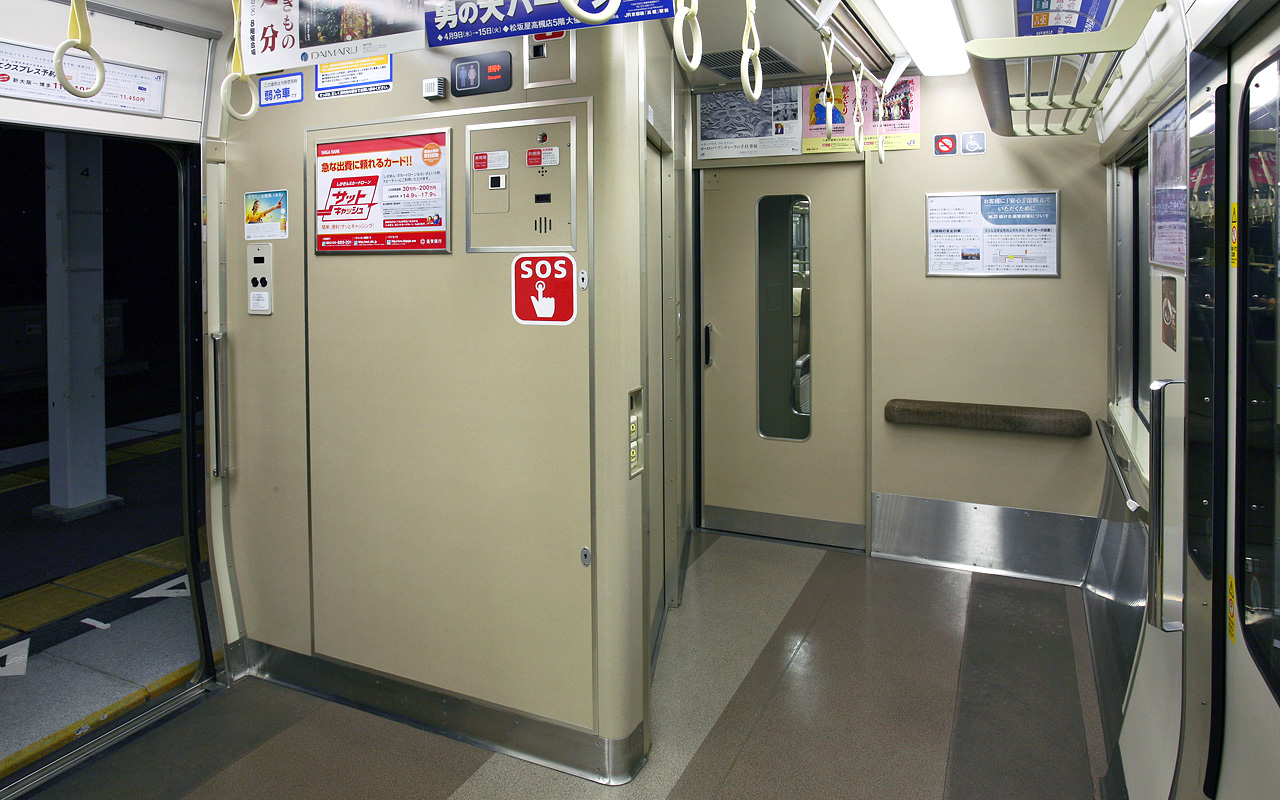
223-2000 series universal access toilet

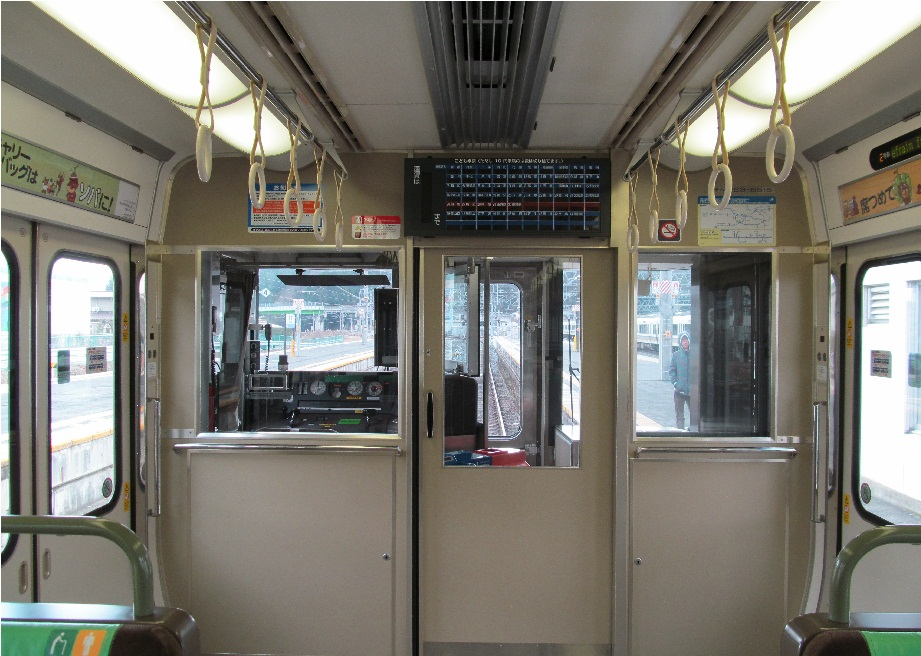
Driver's cab end of 223–5500 series showing LED fare board for wanman driver-only operation

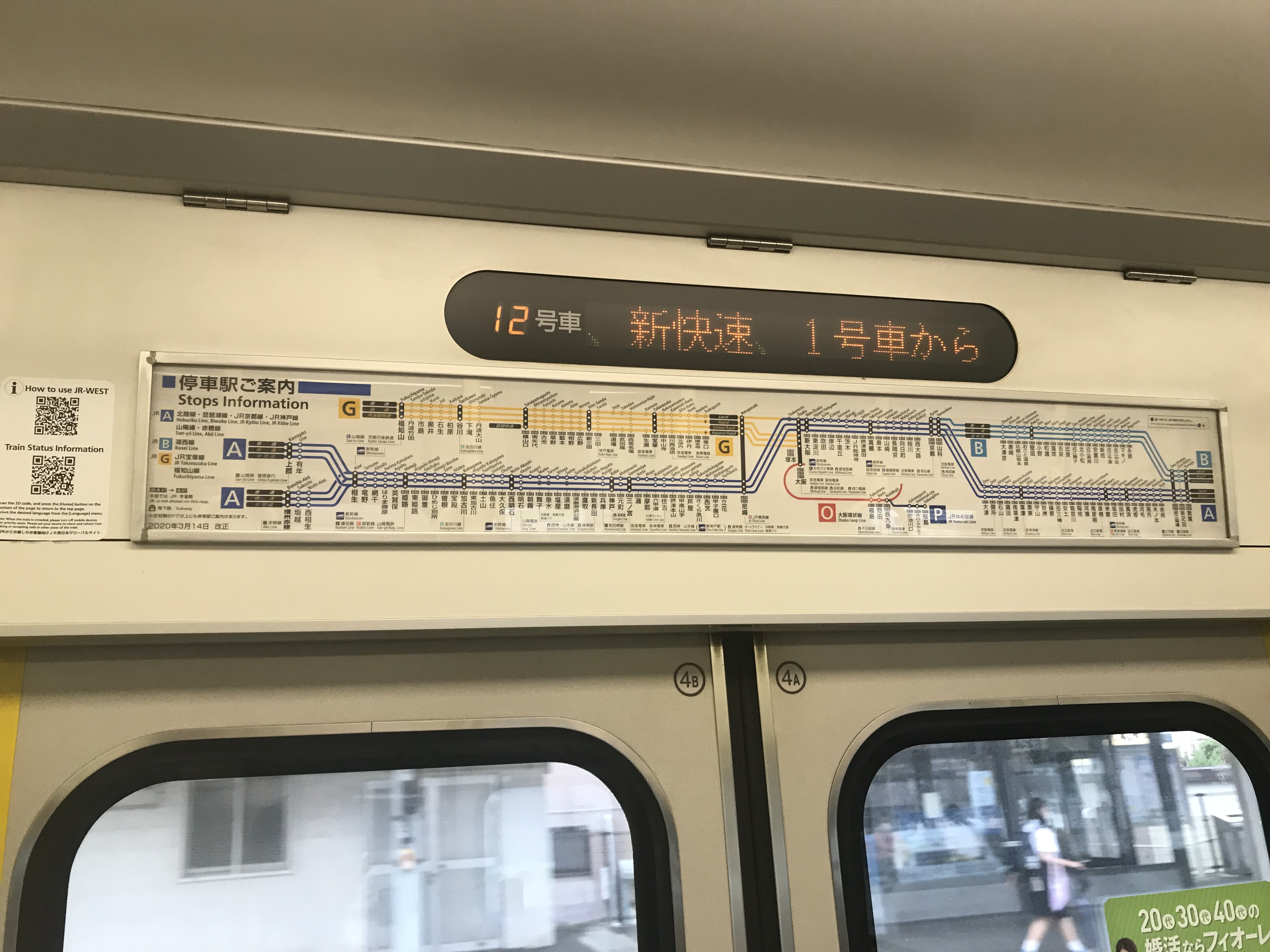
223-2000 series original passenger information display

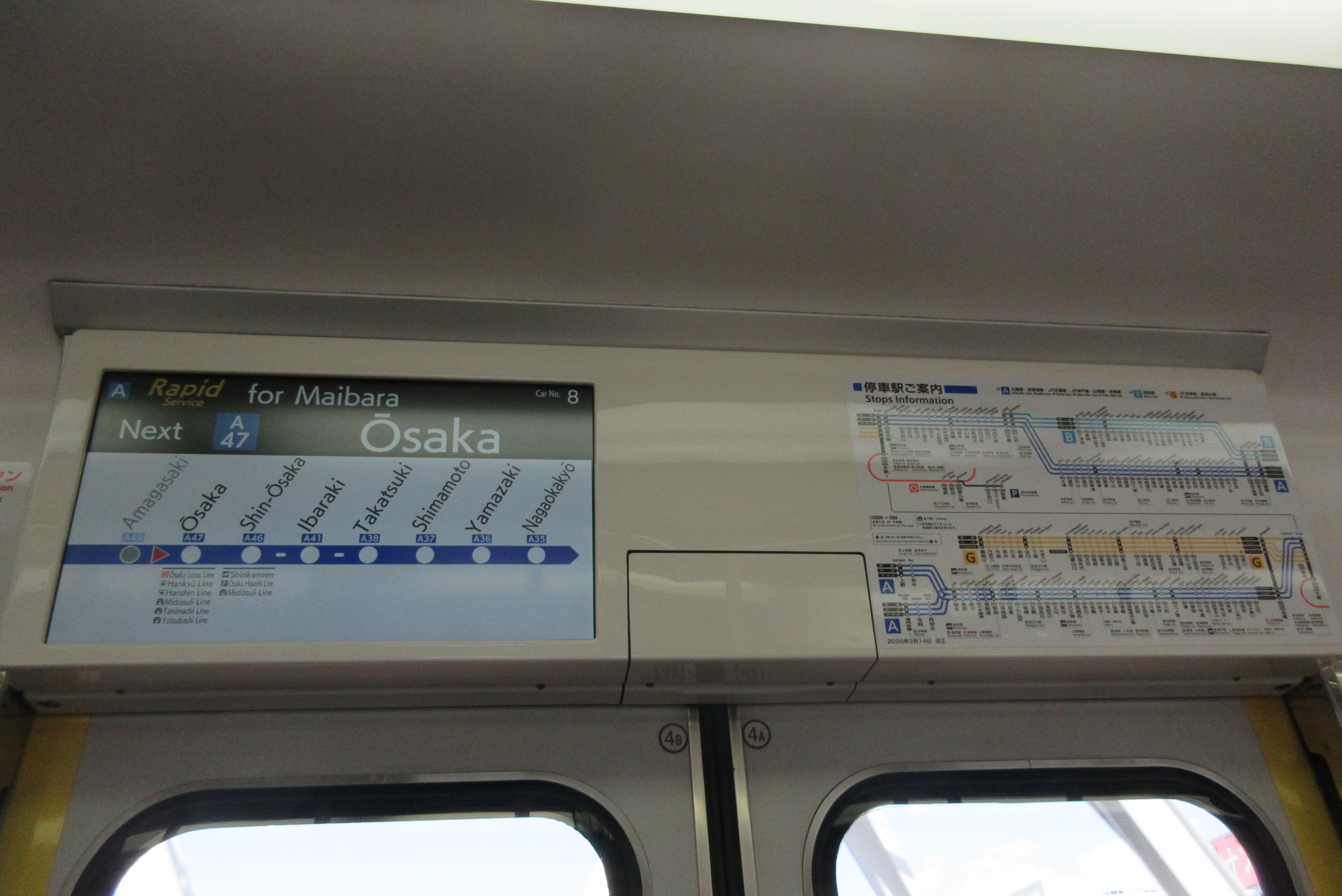
223-2000 series LCD for passenger information

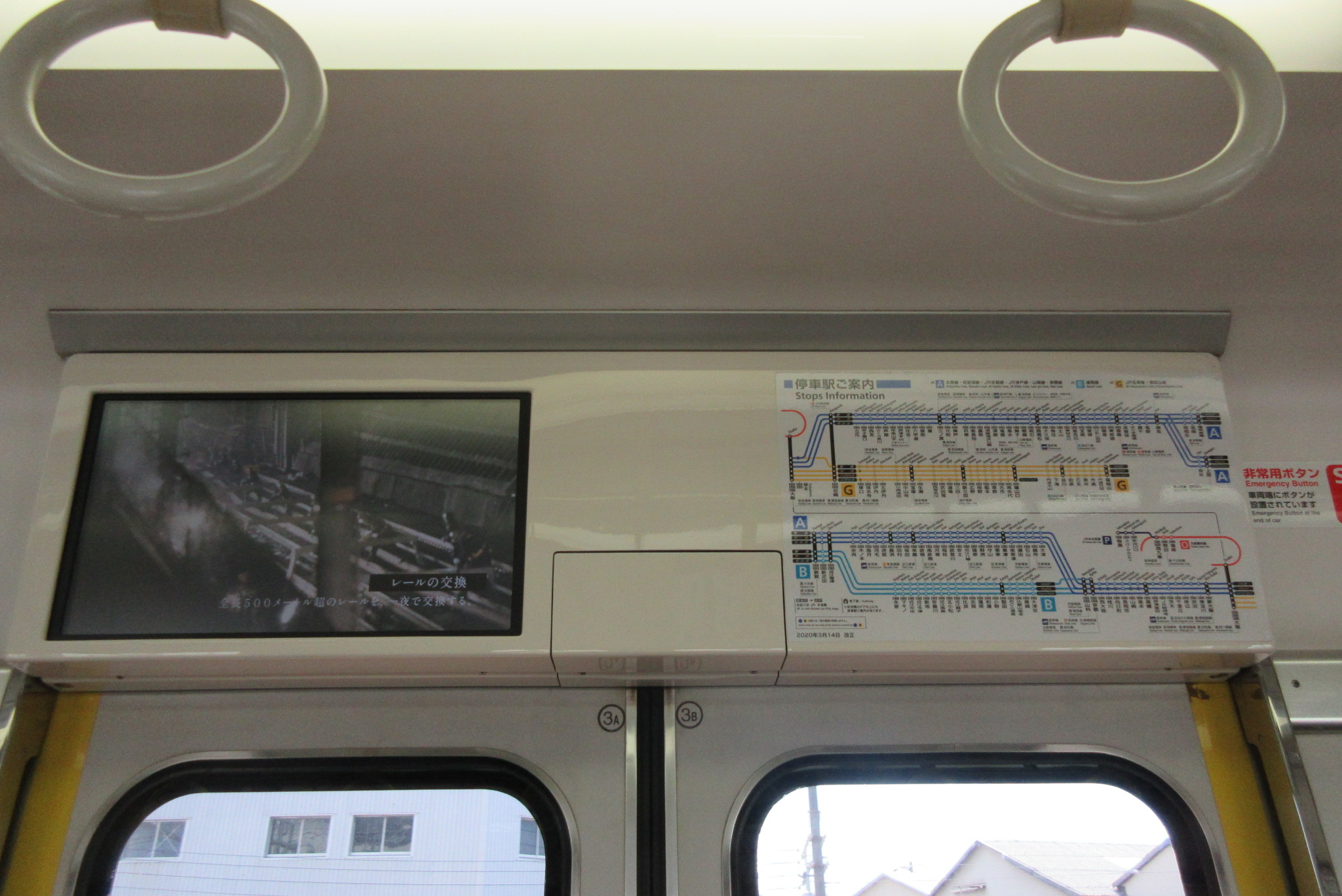
223-2000 series LCD for digital signage
