= Shinkyū-Daigaku-mae Station =

Railway station in Nantan, Kyoto Prefecture, Japan

Shinkyū-Daigaku-mae Station 鍼灸大学前駅
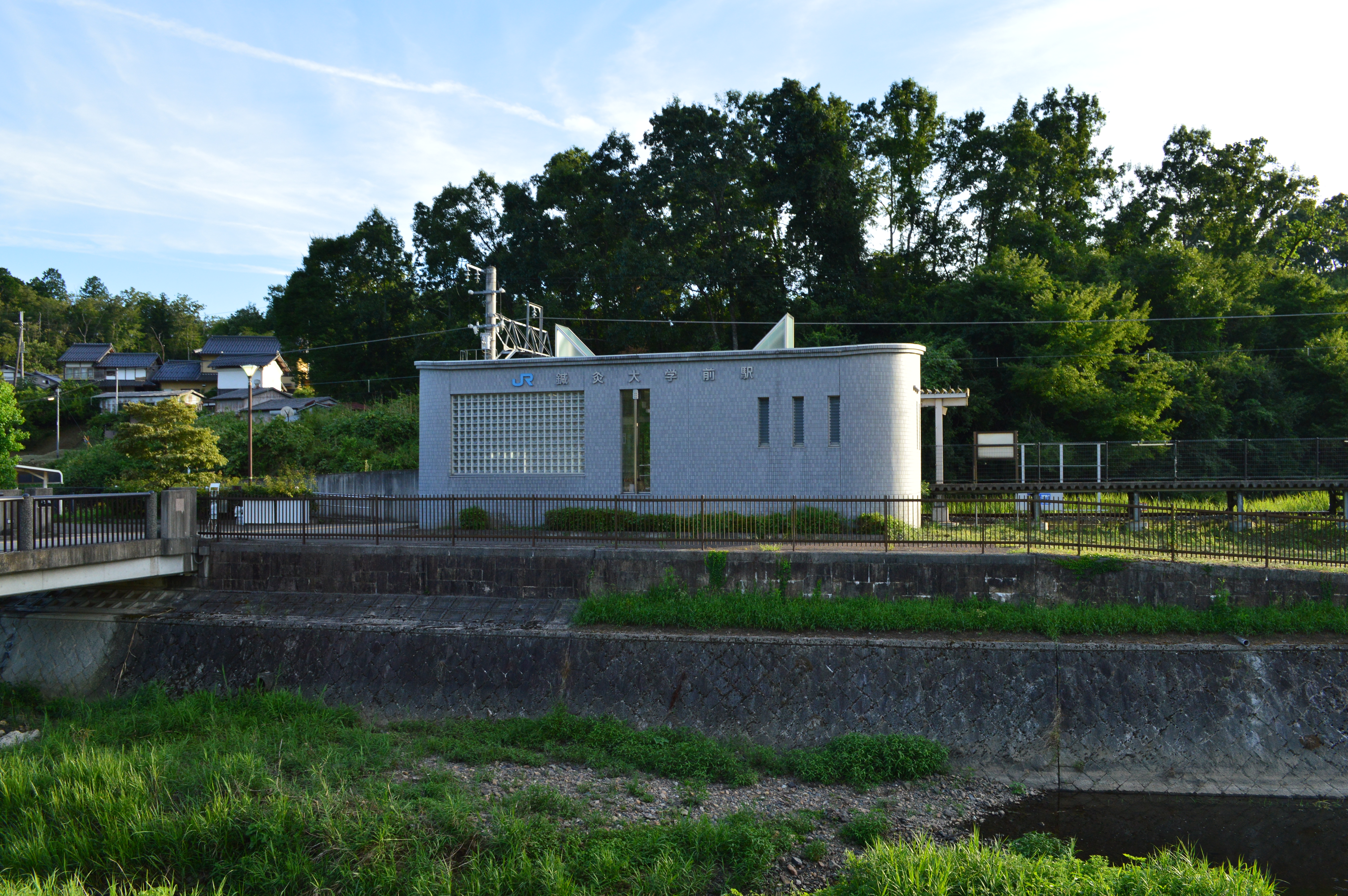
- Shinkyū-Daigaku-mae Station in August 2018

General information
- Location: Hiyoshicho Honda, Nantan-shi, Kyoto-fu 629-0301; Japan
- Coordinates: 35.1790°N 135.4900°E
- Owner: West Japan Railway Company
- Operator: West Japan Railway Company
- Line: San'in Main Line
- Distance: 44.3 km (27.5 miles) from Kyoto
- Platforms: 1 side platform
- Connections: Bus stop

Other information
- Status: Unstaffed
- Website: Official website

History
- Opened: 16 March 1996

Passengers
- FY 2023: 822 daily

Services
Preceding station	JR West	Following station
Goma towards Kinosaki-Onsen	San'in Line Local Rapid	Hiyoshi towards Kyoto
Location
- Location within Kyoto Prefecture Location within Japan

Shinkyū-Daigaku-mae Station (鍼灸大学前駅, Shinkyūdaigakumae-eki) is a passenger railway station located in the city of Nantan, Kyoto Prefecture, Japan, operated by West Japan Railway Company (JR West).

== Lines ==
Shinkyū-Daigaku-mae Station is served by the San'in Main Line, and is located 44.3 kilometers from the terminus of the line at Kyoto.

== Station layout ==
The station consists of one ground-level side platform serving single bi-directional track. The station is unattended.

== History ==
Shinkyū-Daigaku-mae Station opened on 16 March 1996.

== Passenger statistics ==
In fiscal 2018, the station was used by an average of 714 passengers daily.

== Surrounding area ==
- Meiji University of Integral Medicine, University Hospital

== See also ==
- List of railway stations in Japan
