= Goma Station =

Railway station in Nantan, Kyoto Prefecture, Japan

Goma Station 胡麻駅
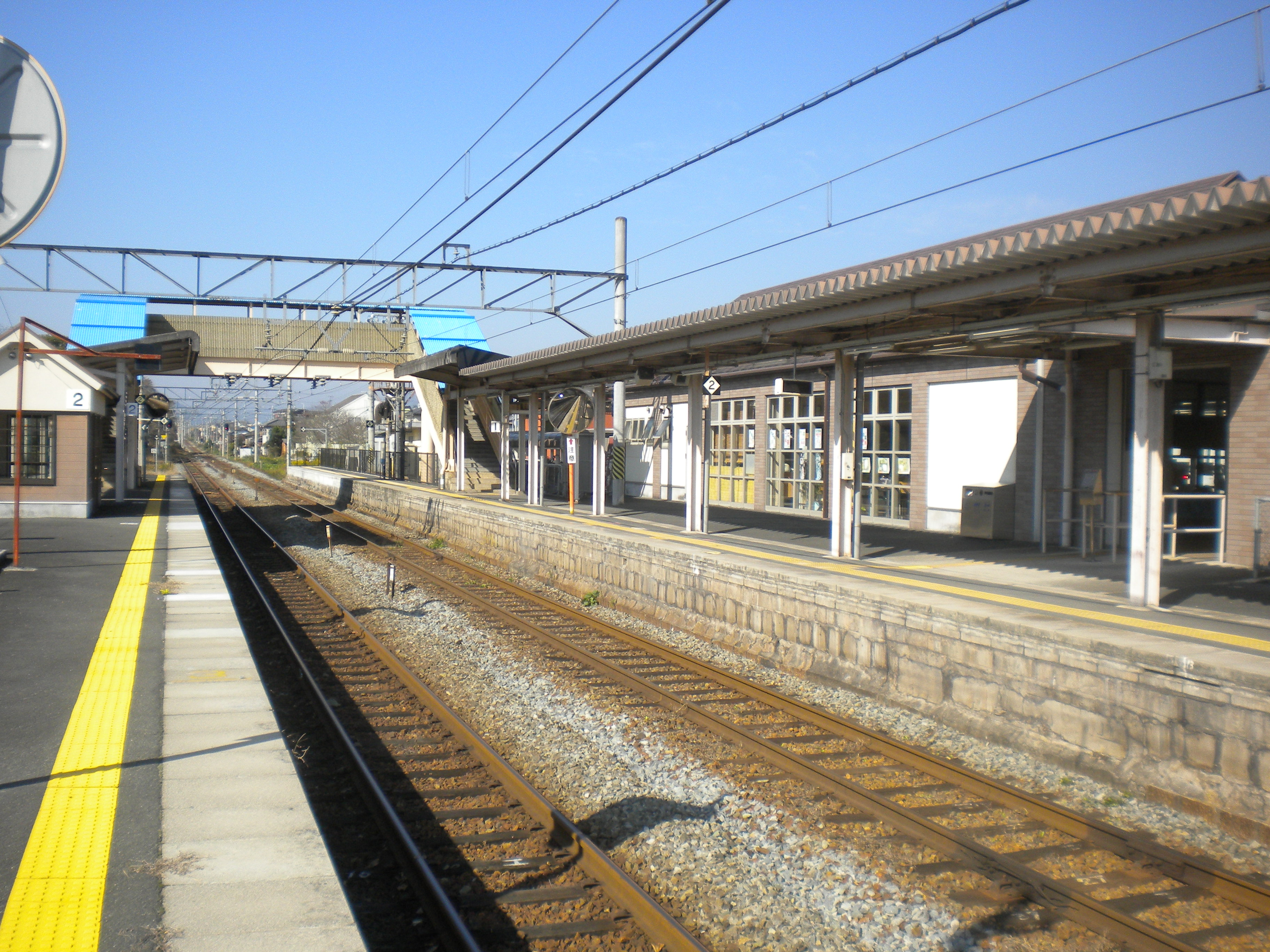
- Goma Station in November 2009

General information
- Location: Hiyoshicho Goma, Nantan-shi, Kyoto-fu 629-0311; Japan
- Coordinates: 35.1954°N 135.4682°E
- Owner: West Japan Railway Company
- Operator: West Japan Railway Company
- Line: San'in Main Line
- Distance: 47.1 km (29.3 miles) from Kyoto
- Platforms: 1 side + 1 island platform
- Tracks: 3
- Connections: Bus stop

Construction
- Structure type: Ground level

Other information
- Status: Unstaffed
- Website: Official website

History
- Opened: 25 August 1910

Passengers
- FY 2023: 478 daily

Services
| Preceding station | JR West | Following station |
|---|---|---|
| Shimoyama towards Kinosaki-Onsen | San'in Line Local Rapid | Shinkyū-Daigaku-mae towards Kyoto |
Location
- Location within Kyoto Prefecture Location within Japan

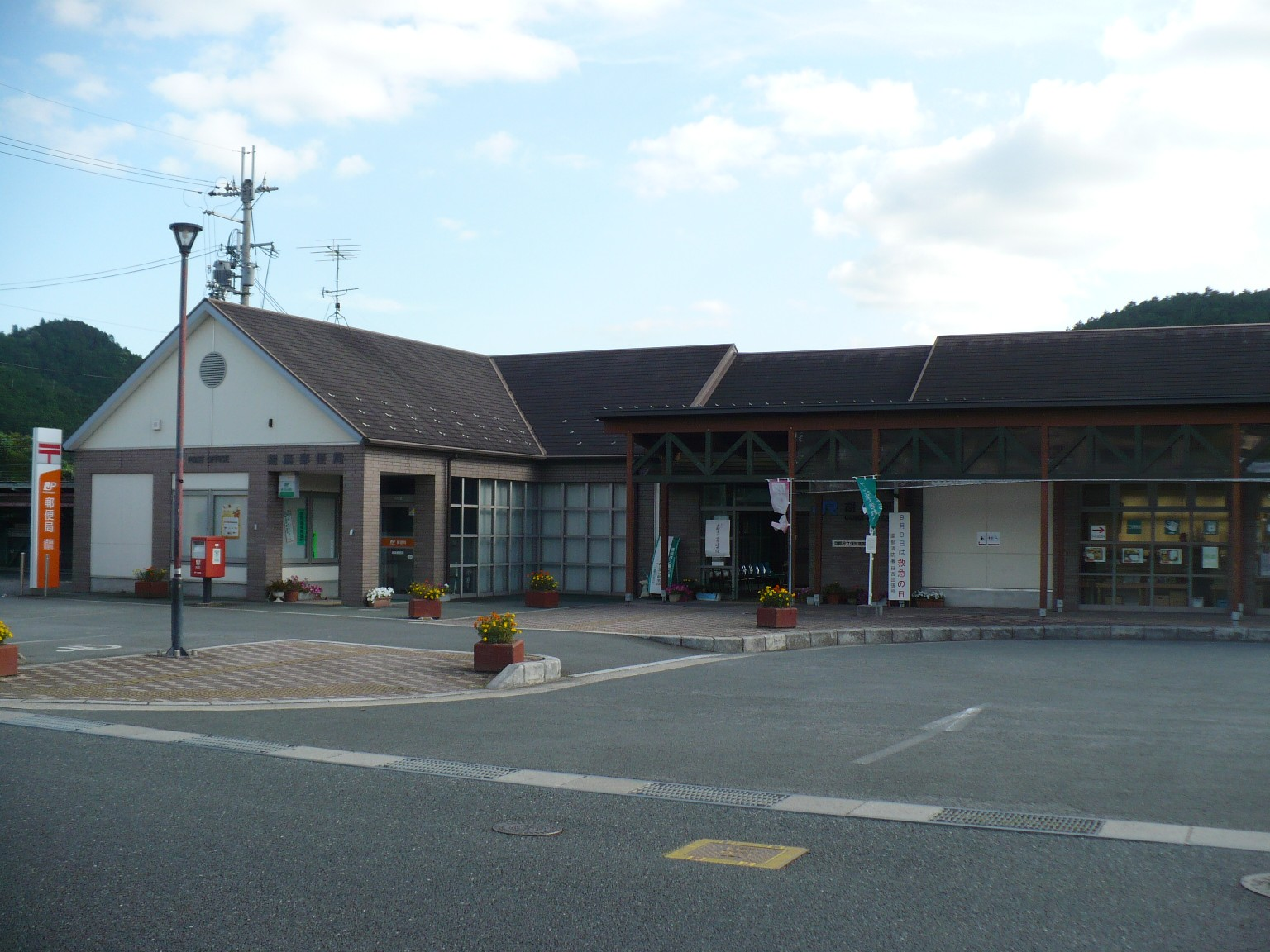
Goma Station and Goma Post Office

Goma Station (胡麻駅, Goma-eki) is a passenger railway station located in the city of Nantan, Kyoto Prefecture, Japan, operated by West Japan Railway Company (JR West).

== Lines ==
Goma Station is served by the San'in Main Line, and is located 47.1 kilometers from the terminus of the line at Kyoto.

== Station layout ==
The station consists of one ground-level island platform and one ground-level side platform connected to the station building by a footbridge. The station is unattended.

=== Platforms ===
| 1 | ■ San'in Main Line | for Sonobe and Kyoto |
| 2, 3 | ■ San'in Main Line | for Ayabe and Fukuchiyama |

== History ==
Goma Station opened on August 25, 1910. With the privatization of the Japan National Railways (JNR) on April 1, 1987, the station came under the aegis of the West Japan Railway Company.

== Passenger statistics ==
In fiscal 2018, the station was used by an average of 586 passengers daily.

== Surrounding area ==
- Nantan Municipal Komago Elementary School

== See also ==
- List of railway stations in Japan
