= Manju =

Manju may refer to:

- Manchuria or Manju, a region of China
  - Manju or Manchu people, a people from Manju
- Manju (era), a Japanese era name
- Manjū, a Japanese confection
- Manju (novel), an Indian novel written by M. T. Vasudevan Nair
  - Manju (film), a 1982 Indian film based on the novel

== People with the given name ==
Manju is a predominantly feminine Indian given name, from Sanskrit mañju 'pleasant, sweet, snow, beautiful, clouds, morning dew'. People with this name include:

- Manju Basu, Indian politician
- Manju Bharat Ram (1945–2012), Indian educationist
- Manju Bhargavi, Indian actress
- Manju Borah (fl. 1999–present), Indian film director
- Manju Dey (1926–1989), Indian film actress in Bengali cinema
- Manju Kak (fl. 1992–present), Indian writer
- Manju Kapur, Indian writer
- Manju Malhi (born c. 1972), British-Indian chef
- Manju Manikuttan (born 1976), Indian social worker
- Manju Pathrose (born 1972), Indian actress
- Manju Rani (boxer) (born 1999), Indian boxer
- Manju Rani (athlete), Indian track and field athlete
- Manju Ray, Indian enzymologist and cancer biochemist
- Manju Sharma (disambiguation)
  - Manju Sharma (biologist) (born 1940), Indian biotechnologist
- Manju Swaraj (born 1982), Indian film director
- Manju Qamaraidullāhī (1908–1983), Indian dramatist and poet
- Manju Warrier (born 1978), Indian actress

== See also ==
- Monju (disambiguation)
- Manjunath (disambiguation)
- Manchu (disambiguation)
- Mandu (disambiguation)
- Manjula, an Indian feminine given name
- Manjul (born 1971), an Indian cartoonist
- Manjushri, a bodhisattva in Mahayana Buddhism
- Sugaar or Maju, a Basque deity
