= Manthey =

Manthey, Mantey, or Mantei may refer to:

- Jerri Manthey (born 1970)
- August Christian Manthey (1811–1880), Norwegian politician
- Carl Viggo Manthey Lange (1904–1999), Norwegian politician
- Halvard Manthey Lange (1902–1970), Norwegian diplomat, politician and statesman
- Ludvig Johan Carl Manthey (1809–1875), Norwegian civil servant
- Marie Manthey (1935–2024), American nurse, author, and entrepreneur
- Olaf Manthey (born 1955), German race driver and team owner
  - Manthey Racing, German Porsche racing team

== Mantei ==
- Matt Mantei (1973), American baseball player
- Mantei River, see Chilka Lake
- Manteis, Greek for "prophet"
  - The Manteis (The Prophets), a fragmentary play by Sophocles

== Mantey ==
- Mantey, Kansas, a community in the United States
- Edward Mantey (born 1946), senior commander in Ghana Air Force
- Patrick Mantey, computer scientist and professor
- Nery Mantey Niangkouara, swim athlete in the 2004 Summer Olympics
- Eberhard von Mantey (1869–1940), German Vice Admiral and Naval historian, see Operational Plan Three

== See also ==
- Manta (disambiguation)
- Ciudad Mante, city in Tamaulipas, Mexico
- Manti (disambiguation)
- Mantis (disambiguation)
