= Myoko =

Myoko may refer to:

- Myōkō, Niigata, a city in Japan
- Mount Myōkō, a volcano located in Niigata Prefecture, Japan
- Japanese cruiser Myōkō, a former cruiser of the Imperial Japanese Navy
- JDS Myōkō (DDG-175), a guided missile destroyer of the Japan Maritime Self-Defense Force
- Myōkō (train), a train service in Japan
