= Monju (disambiguation) =

Monju Nuclear Power Plant was a Japanese nuclear reactor, located in Fukui Prefecture.

Monju may also refer to:

- Monju (train), a train service in Japan
- Monju, the Japanese name for the bodhisattva Manjusri

== See also ==
- Manju (disambiguation)
