= List of Urdu dramatists =

This is a list of those dramatists who wrote their work in the Urdu language. Despite the historical presence of Sanskrit dramas, the history of Urdu drama is begins only with British influences on Urdu in the 19th century. Today Urdu drama has been developed as a separate branch of Urdu literature.

== List ==
| Name | Era | Nationality | Works |
|---|---|---|---|
| Agha Hasan Amanat | 1915–1858 | British India | Andar Sabha (1853) |
| Rawnaq Banarasi | 1882 | British India | Insaf Mahmud Shah |
| Mia Hussaini (Pen name Zareef) | | British India | Asmat, Khuda Dost, Chand Bibi, Bulbul |
| Munshi Banayak Parshad Talib Banarasi | death | British India | |
| Syed Mehdi Hasan Pen name; Ahsan Lakhnuvi) | | British India | Waqiaat Anees, Bhool Bhalian, Chalta Purza |
| Betab Dehluvi | | British India | Qatal e Nazeer, Maha Bharat, |
| Agha Hashar Kashmiri | 1879 – 28 April 1935 | British India | Shaheed Naz, Mureed Shak, Turkey Hur |
| Ghulam Hussain Zareef | 1889 | British India | Anjam Sakhawat |
| Muhammad Abdul Waheed Qais | | British India | Jalsa Paristan |
| Faqir Muhammad Taigh | | British India | Anjam e Ulfat e wa Benazir |
| Feroz Shah Khan | | British India | |
| Ahmad Hassan Wafar | | British India | Bulbul e Bemar |
| Mir Karamatullah | | British India | |
| Mir Wajidullah | | British India | |
| Amrao Ali | | British India | Albert Bill (first Political Urdu Drama), Jehangir (Translation of Hemlat) |
| Munshi Ghulam ALi | | British India | Taeed Yazdani |
| Munshi Muhammad Ibrahim | | British India | Aatishi Nag |
| Munshi Rahmat Ali | | British India | Dard e Jigar |
| Dawarka Parshad Ufaq | | British India | Ram Natak |
| Mirza Abbas | | British India | Noor Jahan wa Shahi Farman |
| Agha Shair Dehluvi | | British India | Hur o Jannat |
| Lala Khishan Chand | | British India | |
| Lala Knwar Seen | | British India | Brhman Natak |
| Hakim Ahmad Shuja | 1893 – 1969 | Pakistan | Bap ka Gunah, Bharat ka lal |
| Syed Imtiaz Ali | | British India | Anar Kali, Dulhan |
| Syed Dilawar Ali Shah | | British India | Punjab MAil |
| Khan Ahmad Hussain | | British India | Husan Ka Bazar |
| Radhy Sham | | British India | |
| Jamiluddin Aali | 1925 – 23 November 2015 | Pakistan | |
| Rajinder Singh Bedi | 1915 – 1984 | Indian | |
| Habib Tanvir | 1923 – 8 June 2009 | India | |
| Manju Qamaraidullāhī | 1908–1983 | India | |
| Shamim Hanfi | 1938–2021 | India | |
| Sajjad Zaheer | 1899 – 13 September 1973 | Pakistan | |
| Munnu Bhai | 1933-2008 | Pakistan | |
| Muhammad Mansha Yaad | | Pakistan | |
| Anwar Maqsood | 1935 | Pakistan | |
| Bano Qudsia | 1928 – 4 February 2017 | Pakistan | |
| Ashfaq Ahmed | 1925 – 7 September 2004 | Pakistan | |
| Zahida Hina | 1946 | Pakistan | |
| Haseena Moin | 1941–2021 | Pakistan | |
| Abdul Hameed | 1925–2011 | Pakistan | |
| Khalid Ahmad | 1943–2013 | Pakistan | |
| Shoaib Hashmi | | Pakistan | |
| Shahid Nadeem | 1947– | Pakistan | |
| Sarwat Nazir | | Pakistan | Main Abdul Qadir Hun |
| Samira Fazal | | Pakistan | Daastan |
| Taj Haider | 1942 | Pakistan | |
| Shamim Hanfi | 1938–2021 | Pakistan | |
| Javed Siddiqi | 1942- | Indian | |
