= Moonlight Nagara =

Japanese seasonal rapid overnight train service (2009–2021)

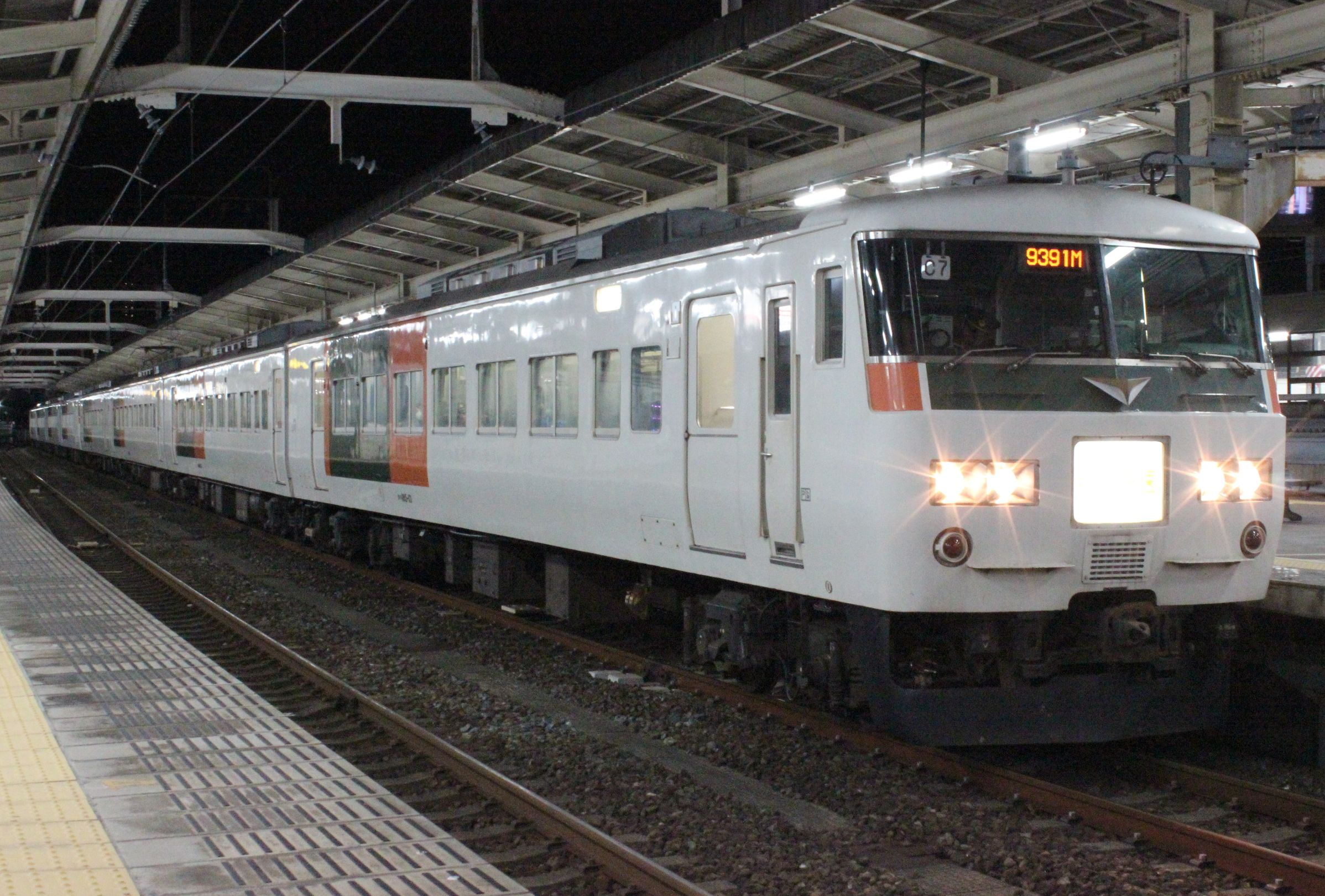
- A 185 series EMU formation on a Moonlight Nagara service, December 2013

Overview
- Service type: Rapid
- Status: Seasonal operation
- Locale: Japan
- First service: 16 March 1996
- Last service: 29 March 2020 (Final operation)
- Current operator(s): JR East, JR Central

Route
- Termini: Tokyo; Ōgaki
- Stops: Shinagawa, Yokohama, Odawara, Numazu, Shizuoka, Hamamatsu, Toyohashi, Nagoya, Gifu
- Average journey time: 6:40 westbound, 6:16 eastbound
- Service frequency: Seasonal
- Line(s) used: Tokaido Main Line

On-board services
- Catering facilities: None

Technical
- Rolling stock: 185 series EMU
- Track gauge: 1,067 mm (3 ft 6 in)
- Electrification: 1,500 V DC

The Moonlight Nagara (ムーンライトながら) was a seasonal rapid overnight train service operated by East Japan Railway Company (JR East) and Central Japan Railway Company (JR Central), which ran from Tokyo to Ōgaki in Gifu Prefecture via the Tokaido Main Line. From 2009, the service had been offered approximately three weeks per year, corresponding to the spring, summer and year-end holiday seasons.

On 22 January 2021, JR East and JR Central announced the cessation of the Moonlight Nagara service, with no replacements offered at the time, due to increased popularity of highway buses and the ageing of trains operated on the line. Since the train service had not operated during the summer and winter of 2020 due to the COVID-19 pandemic, this announcement caused 29 March 2020 to be the final run of the Nagara. As a result, this day also marked the complete cessation of "Moonlight"-branded services from Japan.

== Rolling stock ==
From December 2013, Moonlight Nagara services were formed from 185 series electric multiple unit (EMU) 10-car (4+6-car) formations based at Omiya Depot.

Moonlight Nagara 185 Series Formation (4+6 cars)
Car No.	1	2	3	4	5	6	7	8	9	10
Accommodation	Reserved	Reserved	Reserved	Reserved	Reserved	Reserved	Reserved	Reserved	Reserved	Reserved

- All cars were non-smoking
- Passengers were unable to pass between cars 4 and 5.
- All cars featured reserved seating, meaning a seat reservation ticket (座席指定券) was required to board the train

=== Past rolling stock ===
- 165 series EMUs
- 373 series EMU 9-car formations
- 183/189 series EMUs

Trains normally comprised three three-car 373 series EMUs operated by JR Central and based at Shizuoka Depot. Additional Moonlight Nagara 91 and 92 trains also operated during busy seasons, and these comprised ten-car 183 series EMU sets owned by JR East and based at Tamachi Depot.

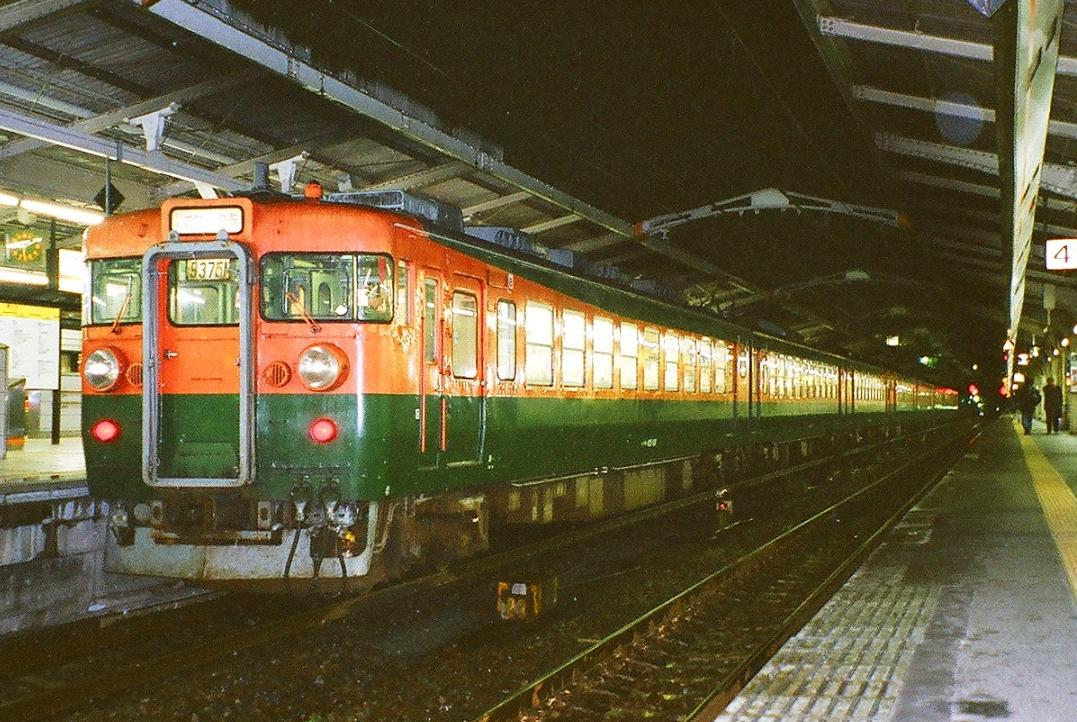
165 series, December 2000

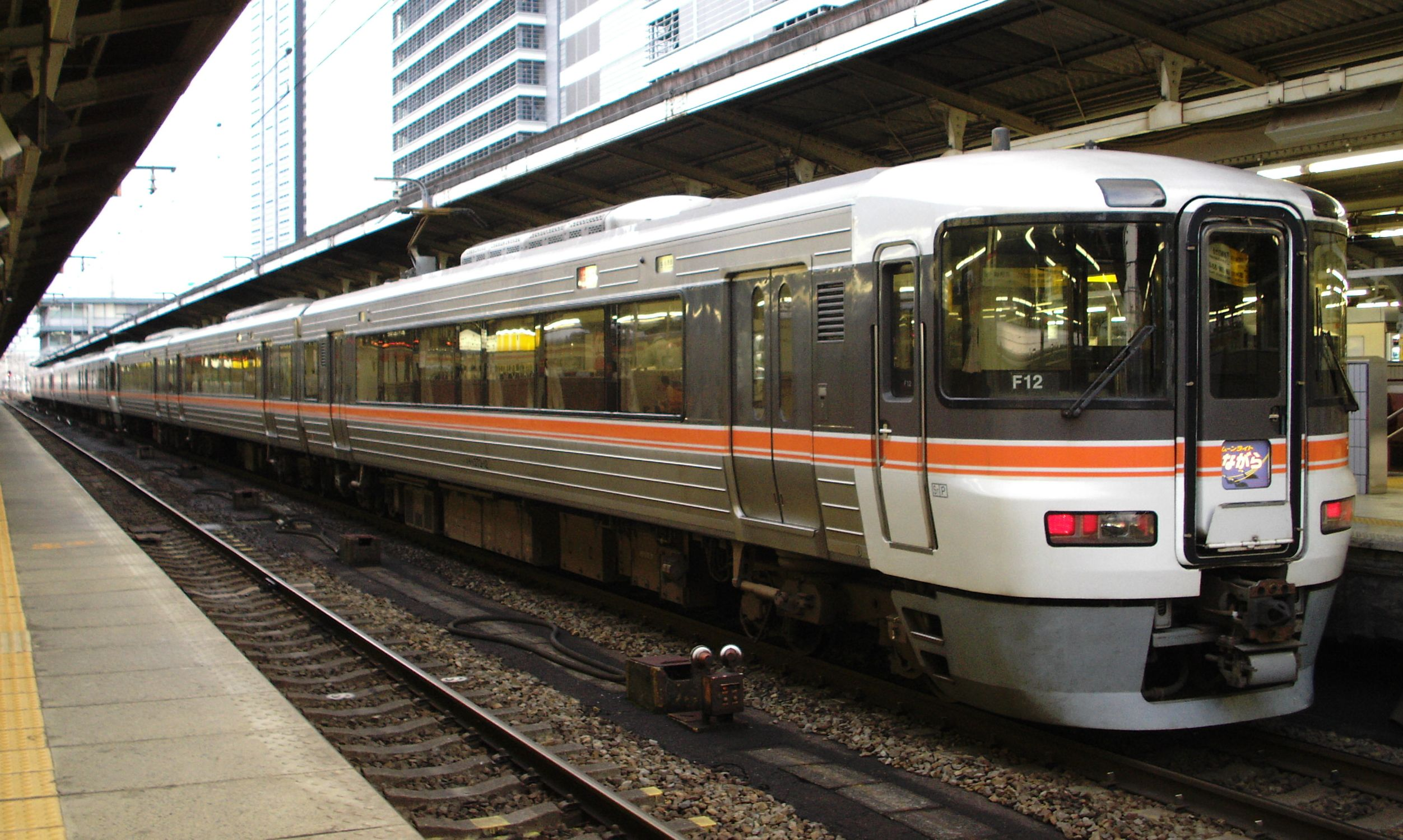
373 series, September 2007

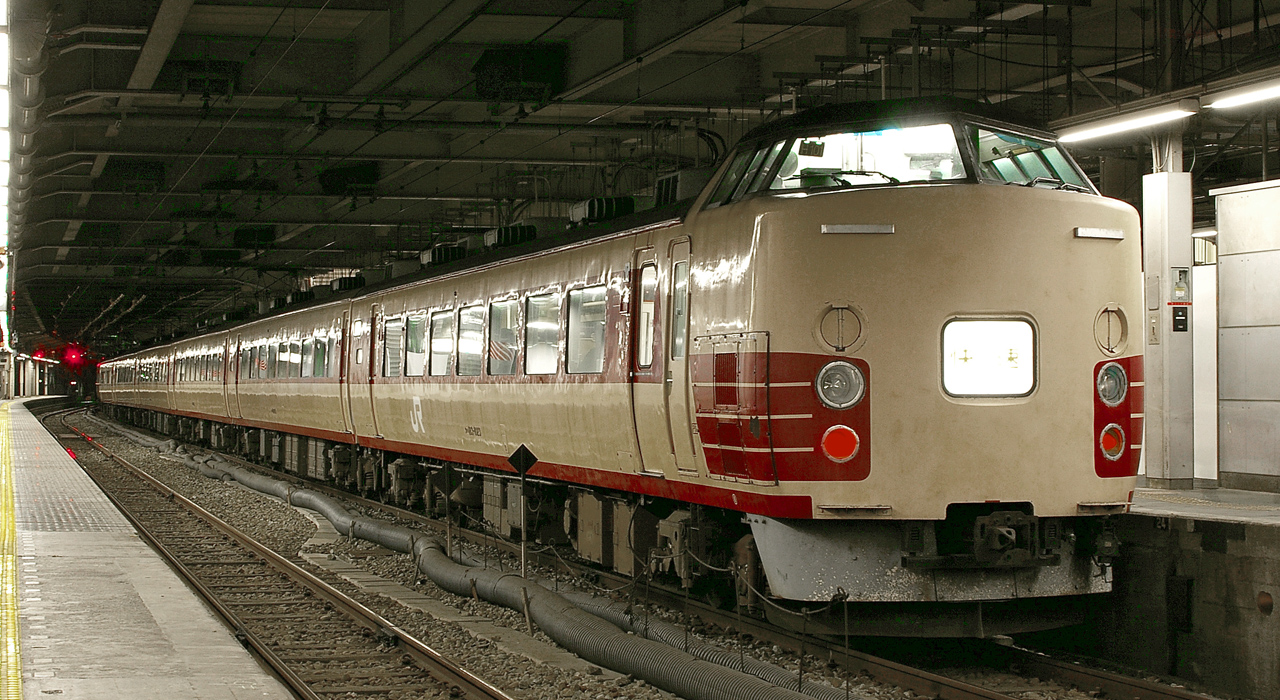
183/189 series, January 2007

== Station list ==
Station		Distance (km)		Time		Location		Remarks
Name	Japanese	Between stations	From Tokyo	Westbound (-> Ōgaki)	Eastbound (-> Tokyo)	Ward / City	Prefecture / Metropolis	Remarks
Tokyo	東京	-	0.0	23:10 Departure	5:05 Arrival	Chiyoda	Tokyo	
Shinagawa	品川	6.8	6.8	23:17 Arrival 23:18 Departure	4:57 Arrival 4:58 Departure	Minato	Tokyo	
Yokohama	横浜	22.0	28.8	23:35 Arrival 23:36 Departure	4:40 Arrival 4:41 Departure	Yokohama	Kanagawa	
Odawara	小田原	55.1	83.9	0:30 Arrival 0:31 Departure	↑	Odawara	Kanagawa	Westbound: First stop after midnight (12am)
Numazu	沼津	42.3	126.2	1:07 Arrival 1:08 Departure	3:05 Arrival 3:19 Departure	Numazu	Shizuoka	
Shizuoka	静岡	54.0	180.2	1:48 Arrival 1:50 Departure	1:52 Arrival 1:55 Departure	Shizuoka	Shizuoka	
Hamamatsu	浜松	76.9	257.1	2:46 Arrival 3:15 Departure	0:46 Arrival 0:55 Departure	Hamamatsu	Shizuoka	Westbound: 29 minutes stop Eastbound: 9 minutes stop
Toyohashi	豊橋	36.5	293.6	↓	0:15 Arrival 0:18 Departure	Toyohashi	Aichi	Eastbound: First stop after midnight (12am)
Nagoya	名古屋	72.4	366.0	5:19 Arrival 5:21 Departure	23:18 Arrival 23:20 Departure	Nagoya	Aichi	
Gifu	岐阜	30.3	396.3	5:40 Arrival 5:41 Departure	22:58 Arrival 22:59 Departure	Gifu	Gifu	
Ōgaki	大垣	13.7	410.0	5:50 Arrival	22:48 Departure	Ōgaki	Gifu	

== History ==
The Moonlight Nagara service was introduced on 16 March 1996. The name was taken from the Nagara River in Gifu Prefecture, and was formerly used for a semi express service which ran between Tokyo and Ōgaki from 1 June 1960 until 1 October 1965.

Overnight services on the Moonlight Nagara route had existed in various forms since 1899, when through services commenced between Shimbashi in Tokyo and Kobe, extending as far west as Kagoshima in the 1940s. Prior to World War II, as many as seven overnight round-trip services existed on this route. Rail services were cut dramatically in the wake of the war. The line briefly saw three to four daily overnight services in the late 1950s, but electrification of the line, coupled with the opening of the Tokaido Shinkansen high-speed line in 1964, reduced the need for overnight services.

Initially, cars 4 to 9 were designated as non-reserved seating cars west of Yokohama Station, but from the start of the March 2007 timetable revision, all cars were designated as reserved seating between Tokyo and Toyohashi.

The service's popularity declined in the 2000s due to competition from discounted overnight bus services. From 14 March 2009, the Moonlight Nagara stopped running on a daily basis and became a seasonal train running only during busy periods.

== See also ==
- List of named passenger trains of Japan
