= 183 series =

Japanese train type

183 / 189 series
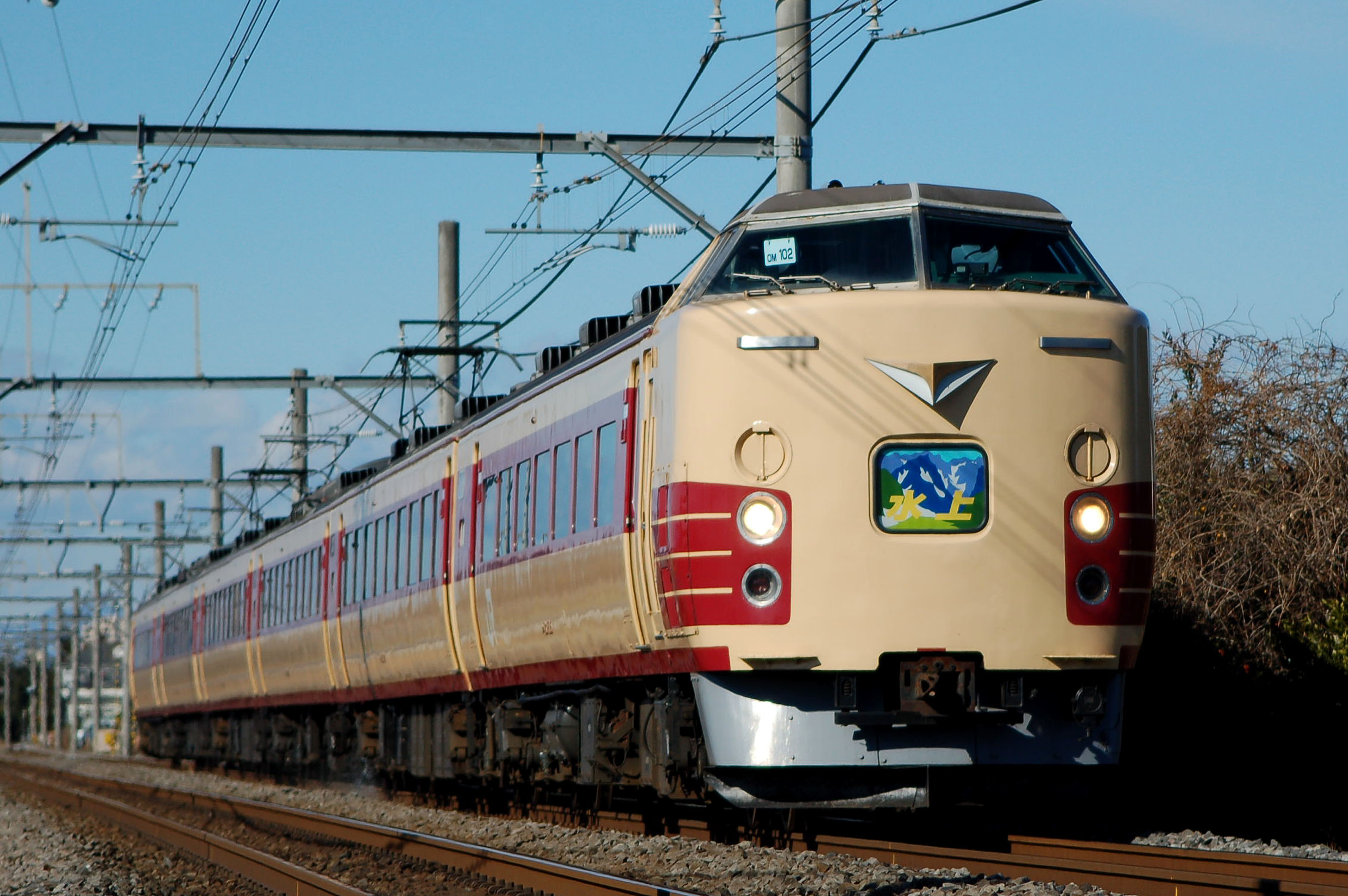
- A 183 series set on an additional Minakami service in January 2008
- In service: July 1972 – March 2019
- Manufacturers: Kawasaki Heavy Industries, Kinki Sharyo, Nippon Sharyo, Tokyu Car Corporation, JR-West
- Constructed: 1972–1982 (183 series); 1975, 1978–1979 (189 series)
- Entered service: July 1972 (183 series); October 1975 (189 series)
- Refurbished: 1990–2009
- Scrapped: 2013–2019
- Number built: 512 vehicles (183 series); 155 vehicles (189 series)
- Number in service: None
- Number preserved: 6 vehicles (183 series); 5 vehicles (189 series)
- Number scrapped: 506 vehicles(183 series); 150 vehicles (189 series)
- Successor: 253 series, 255 series, 287 series, E257 series, E351 series
- Formation: 4, 6, 9, 10, 11 or 12 cars per set (183 series); 4, 6 or 8 cars per set (189 series)
- Operators: 183 series JNR (1972–1987); JR East (1987–2015); JR West (1990–March 2013); 189 series JNR (1975–1987); JR East (1987–March 2019)
- Depot: Various
- Line served: Various

Specifications
- Car body construction: Steel
- Car length: 21 m (68 ft 11 in) (end cars); 20.5 m (67 ft 3 in) (intermediate cars)
- Width: 2,946 mm (9 ft 8.0 in)
- Maximum speed: 120 km/h (75 mph)
- Traction system: Resistor control
- Electric system: 1,500 V DC
- Current collection: Overhead catenary
- Braking systems: Dynamic brake, electro-pneumatic brake
- Safety systems: ATS-S, ATC-5
- Track gauge: 1,067 mm (3 ft 6 in)

Notes/references
- This train won the 16th Blue Ribbon Award in 1973.

The 183 series (183系, 183-kei) was a Japanese limited express electric multiple unit (EMU) train type introduced in 1972 by Japanese National Railways (JNR). Following the privatization of JNR, the 183 series was operated by East Japan Railway Company (JR East) and West Japan Railway Company (JR-West). In terms of design, it is closely based on the late-model AC/DC 485 series, with minor cosmetic differences and DC-only drive. The last 189 series sets were withdrawn on 29 March 2019.

The trains were built by Hitachi, Kawasaki Heavy Industries, Kinki Sharyo, Nippon Sharyo, and Tokyu Car Corporation.

== Former operations ==
=== JR East ===
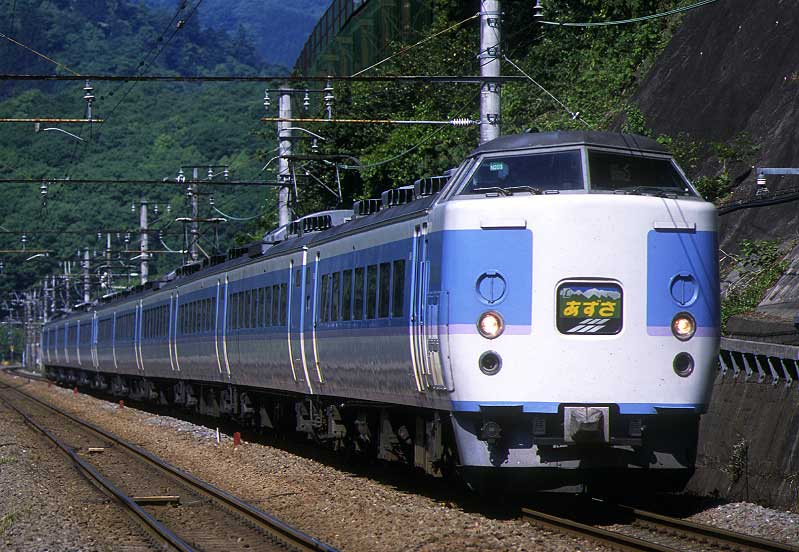
A 183 series displaying on an Azusa service in May 2001

- Azusa (seasonal only)
- Kaiji (seasonal only)
- Wing
- Moonlight Shinshū
- Moonlight Nagara
- Sazanami
- Wakashio
- Shiosai
- Ayame
- Suigo
- Toki
- Amagi
- Odoriko
- Asama
- Myōkō
- Ohayō Liner
- Chūō Liner (until March 2008)
- Ōme Liner (until June 2002)

=== JR-West ===
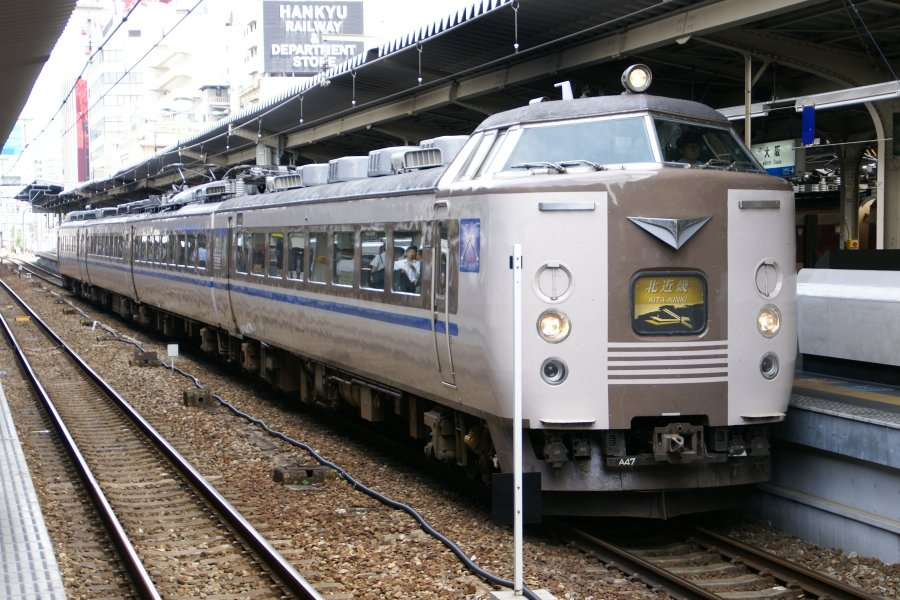
183 series on a Kitakinki service at Osaka Station in September 2007

The 183 series trains operated by JR-West were actually DC-only conversions of 485 series trainsets. They were used on limited-express services from Kyoto and Shin-Osaka to the northern coast of Kyoto and Hyogo prefectures, as part of the "Kitakinki Big X Network." These trainsets were gradually phased out from spring 2011 in favor of the new 287 series, and completely removed from regular scheduled services by the start of the revised timetable on 16 March 2013.

- Kitakinki (until March 2011)
- Kounotori (until 15 March 2013)
- Kinosaki (until March 2013)
- Tamba (until March 2011)
- Hashidate (until March 2013)
- Maizuru (until March 2011)
- Monju (until March 2011)
