= Mandu =

Mandu may refer to:

== Geographic toponyms ==
- Mandu River, a river in Minas Gerais, Brazil
- Mandu, Democratic Republic of the Congo, a village
- Mandu, Madhya Pradesh, a ruined city in Dhar district, Madhya Pradesh, India
- Mandu, Jharkhand, a township in Ramgarh district, Jharkhand, India
  - Mandu Assembly constituency, assembly constituency in Jharkhand, India
  - Mandu (community development block), Jharkhand, India

== Other uses ==
- Mandu (food), a type of filled dumpling in Korean cuisine
- Mandu, a mutated pig adopted by Kipo in the DreamWorks animated series Kipo and the Age of Wonderbeasts.

== See also ==
- Manju (disambiguation)
- Manti (disambiguation)
- Mándu, Australian rock singer from the 1970s
