= Moonlight Shinshū =

Japanese overnight rapid train service (2002–2018)

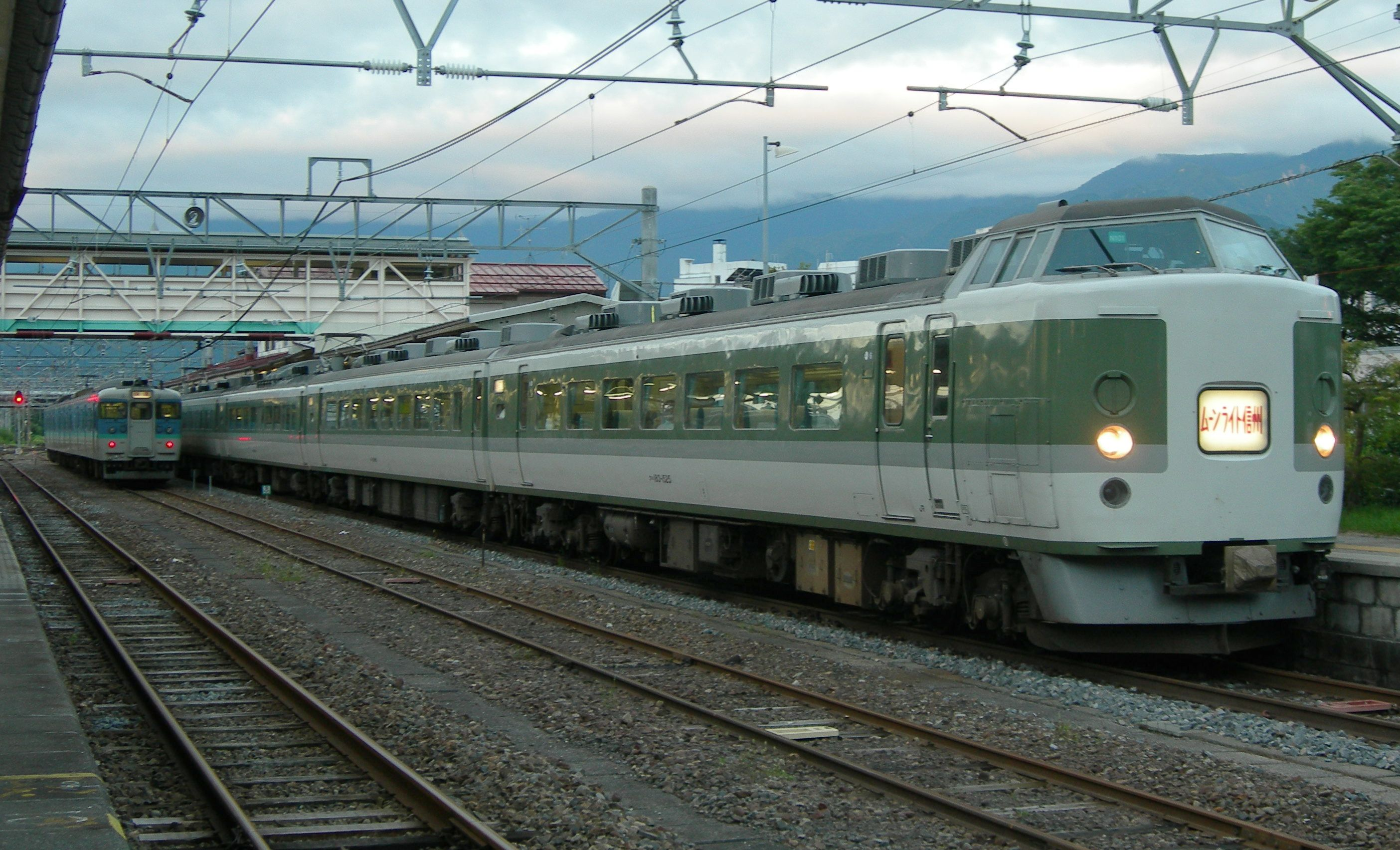

Overview
- Service type: Rapid
- Status: Discontinued
- Locale: Japan
- First service: 2002
- Last service: 2018
- Current operator(s): JR East

Route
- Line(s) used: Chūō Main Line, Shinonoi Line, Ōito Line

Technical
- Rolling stock: 189 series EMUs

The Moonlight Shinshū (ムーンライト信州) was a seasonal overnight Rapid service operated by East Japan Railway Company (JR East), which ran between Shinjuku and Hakuba Station via the Chūō Main Line, Shinonoi Line, and Ōito Line. The service started in 2002, and is operated using 6- or 9-car 183 series or 189 series EMUs. While JR East has not formally announced its discontinuation, no services have operated since December 30, 2018.

== Route ==
The main station stops for the Moonlight Shinshū service were as follows, although the exact stopping patterns vary depending on the time of year.

- Shinjuku - Tachikawa - Hachiōji - Takao - Ōtsuki - Enzan - Kōfu - Kobuchizawa - Fujimi - Chino - Kami-Suwa - Shimo-Suwa - Okaya - Shiojiri - Matsumoto - Shinano-Ōmachi - Hakuba

== Formations ==
←Shinjuku							Matsumoto/Hakuba→
1 Reserved	2 Reserved	3 Reserved	4 Reserved	5 Reserved	6 Reserved	7 Green	8 Reserved	9 Reserved

←Shinjuku						Matsumoto/Hakuba→
1 Reserved	2 Reserved	3 Reserved	4 Reserved	5 Reserved	6 Reserved

== See also ==
- List of named passenger trains of Japan
