= Tamba (train) =

Japanese limited express train service (1960–2011)

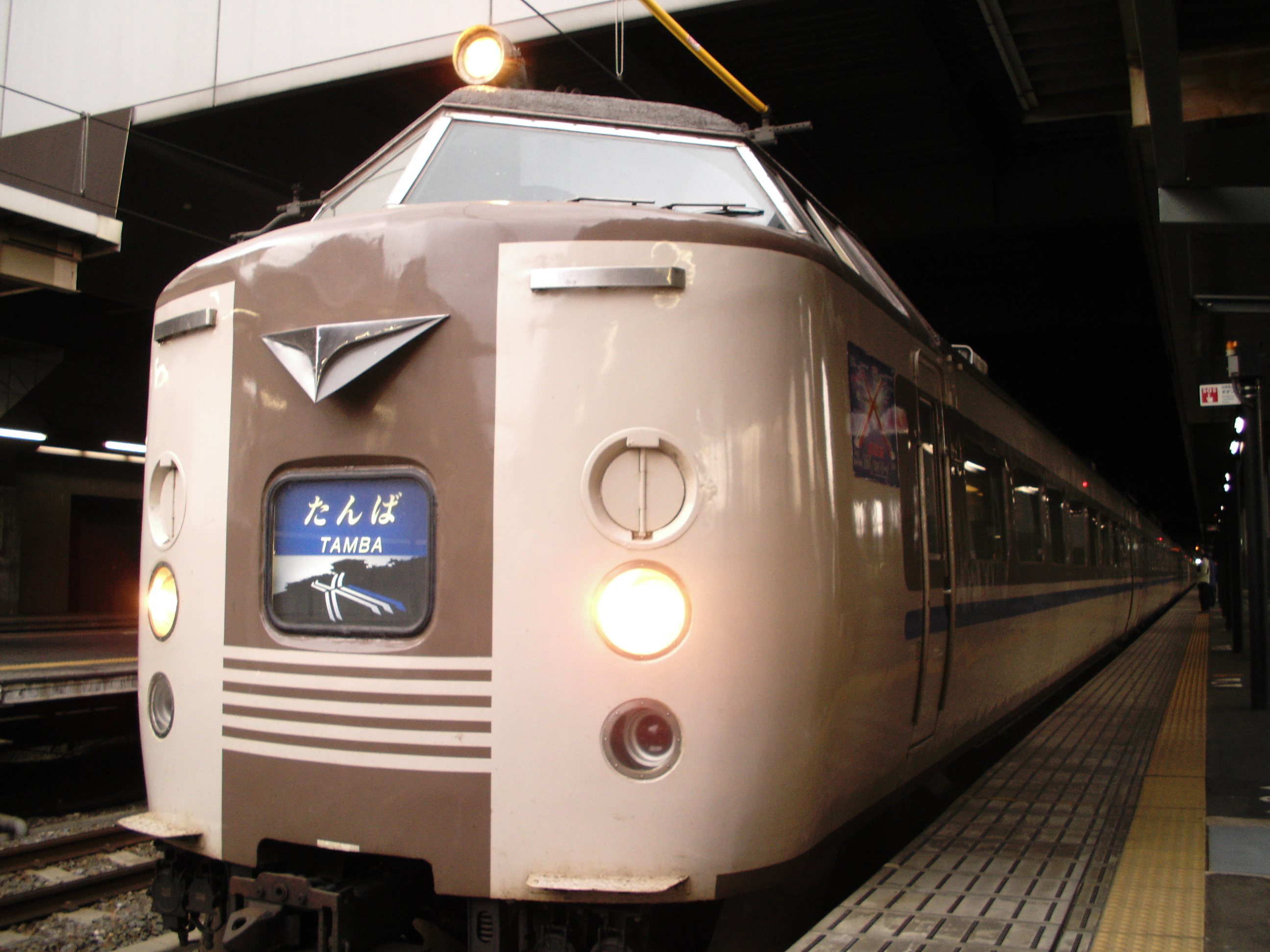
- 183 series train on a Tamba service at Kyoto Station, March 2006

Overview
- Service type: Limited express
- First service: 1960
- Last service: 2011
- Former operator(s): JR West

Route
- Line(s) used: San'in Main Line

Technical
- Rolling stock: 183 series
- Operating speed: 120 km/h (75 mph)

The Tamba (たんば) was a limited express train service operated by West Japan Railway Company (JR West) in Japan. It operated from 1960 to 2011 between Kyoto and Fukuchiyama via the San'in Main Line, and was one of the services that make up JR West's "Kitakinki Big X Network" in northern Kansai. The color associated with the service was blue.

== Station stops ==
Kyoto – Nijō – Kameoka – Sonobe – (Hiyoshi) – (Goma) – (Wachi) – Ayabe – Fukuchiyama

Stations in parentheses were not served by all trains.

== Rolling stock ==
This service was operated with 4-car 183 series electric multiple unit trains based at Fukuchiyama Depot. Some trains operated coupled with 3-car Maizuru sets between Kyoto and Ayabe. Some services had an entire Green (first class) car as car 1, while some services had only half of car 1 providing Green car accommodation.

== History ==
The Tamba (丹波) service was first introduced on 1 June 1960 as a "semi express" service operating between Osaka and Kinosaki (now Kinosaki Onsen). It was upgraded to become an "express" service from 5 March 1966. It was however discontinued from 1 November 1986. The name Tamba comes from the feudal-era Tanba Province, which was situated in what is now northern Kyoto Prefecture and northeastern Hyōgo Prefecture.

From 16 March 1996, the Tamba name was revived for new limited express services operating between Kyoto and Fukuchiyama following the electrification of the Sanin Main Line. From 18 March 2007, all cars were made non-smoking. From the start of the 12 March 2011 timetable revision, Tamba services were absorbed into Kinosaki services.
