= Myōkō (train) =

Japanese limited-stop train service (1997–2015)

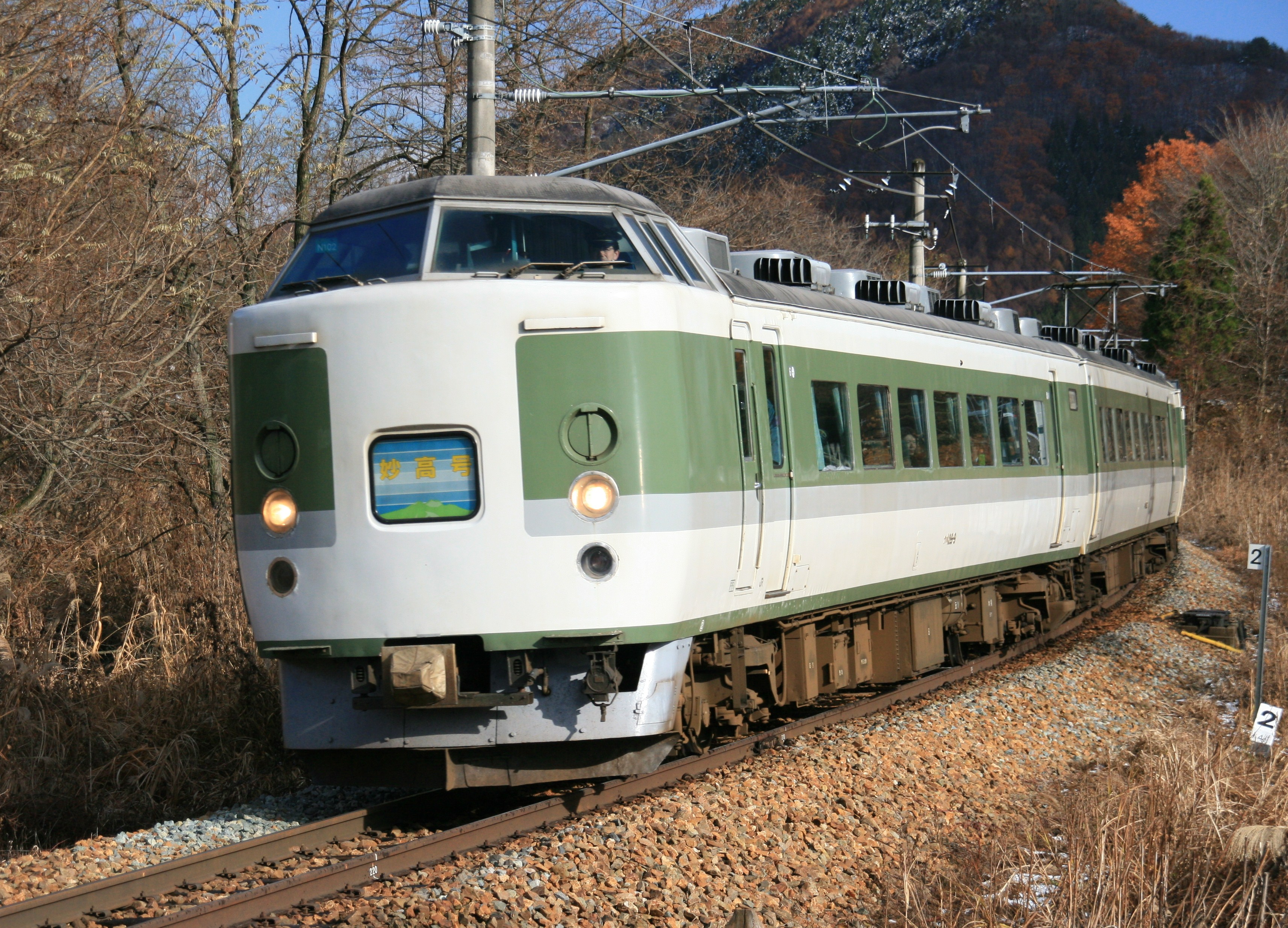
- 189 series EMU on a Myōkō rapid service, November 2008

Overview
- Service type: Rapid
- Status: Discontinued
- Locale: Honshu, Japan
- First service: 14 April 1958 (Semi express); 1 December 1962 (Express); 1 October 1997 (Rapid)
- Last service: 13 March 2015
- Former operator(s): JNR, JR East

Route
- Termini: Nagano; Naoetsu
- Service frequency: 5 return workings daily
- Line(s) used: Shinetsu Main Line

On-board services
- Class(es): Standard only

Technical
- Rolling stock: 189 series EMUs
- Track gauge: 1,067 mm (3 ft 6 in)
- Electrification: 1,500 V DC overhead
- Operating speed: 95 km/h (60 mph)

The Myōkō (妙高) was a limited-stop "Rapid" train service in Japan operated by the East Japan Railway Company (JR East) between Nagano and Naoetsu on the Shinetsu Main Line from October 1997 until March 2015. The train was named after Mount Myōkō on the boundary between Nagano and Niigata Prefecture.

== Service pattern ==
Services consisted of five trains in each direction daily.

== Rolling stock ==
Services were formed using a fleet of three Nagano-based 6-car 189 series EMUs, numbered N101 to N103, of which the rear car (car 1 from Nagano, car 6 from Naoetsu) was designated as reserved seating.

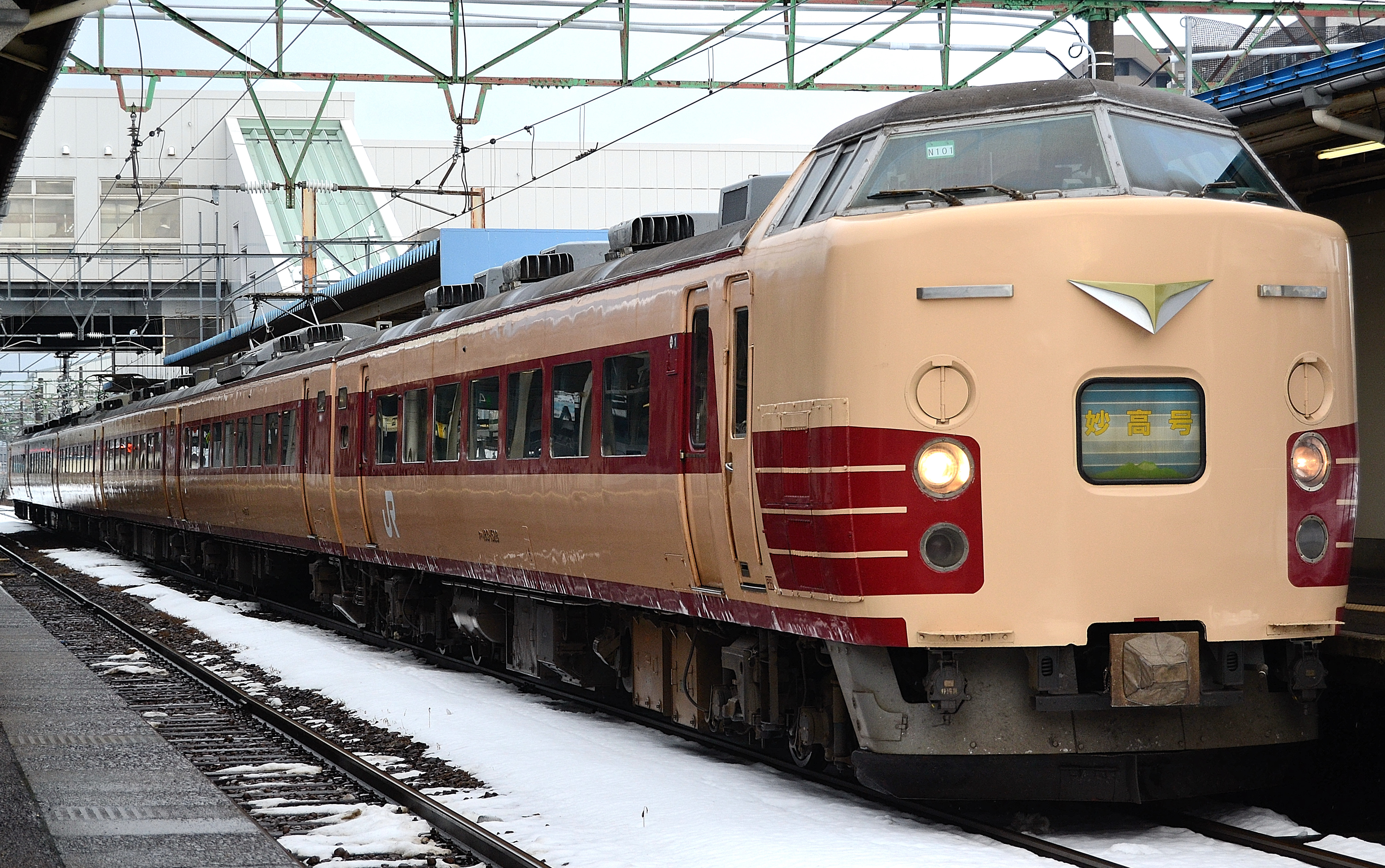
Set N101 in JNR livery, December 2014

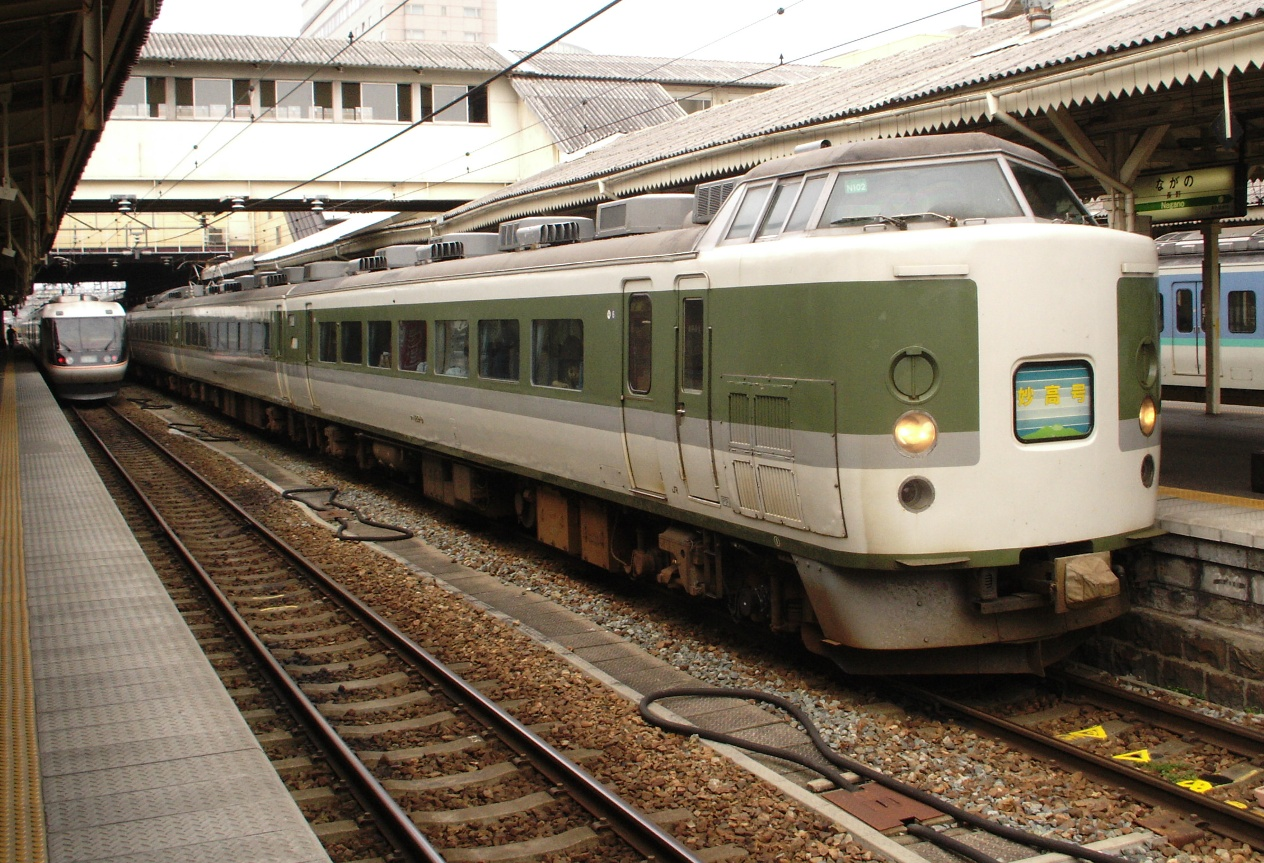
Set N102, July 2007

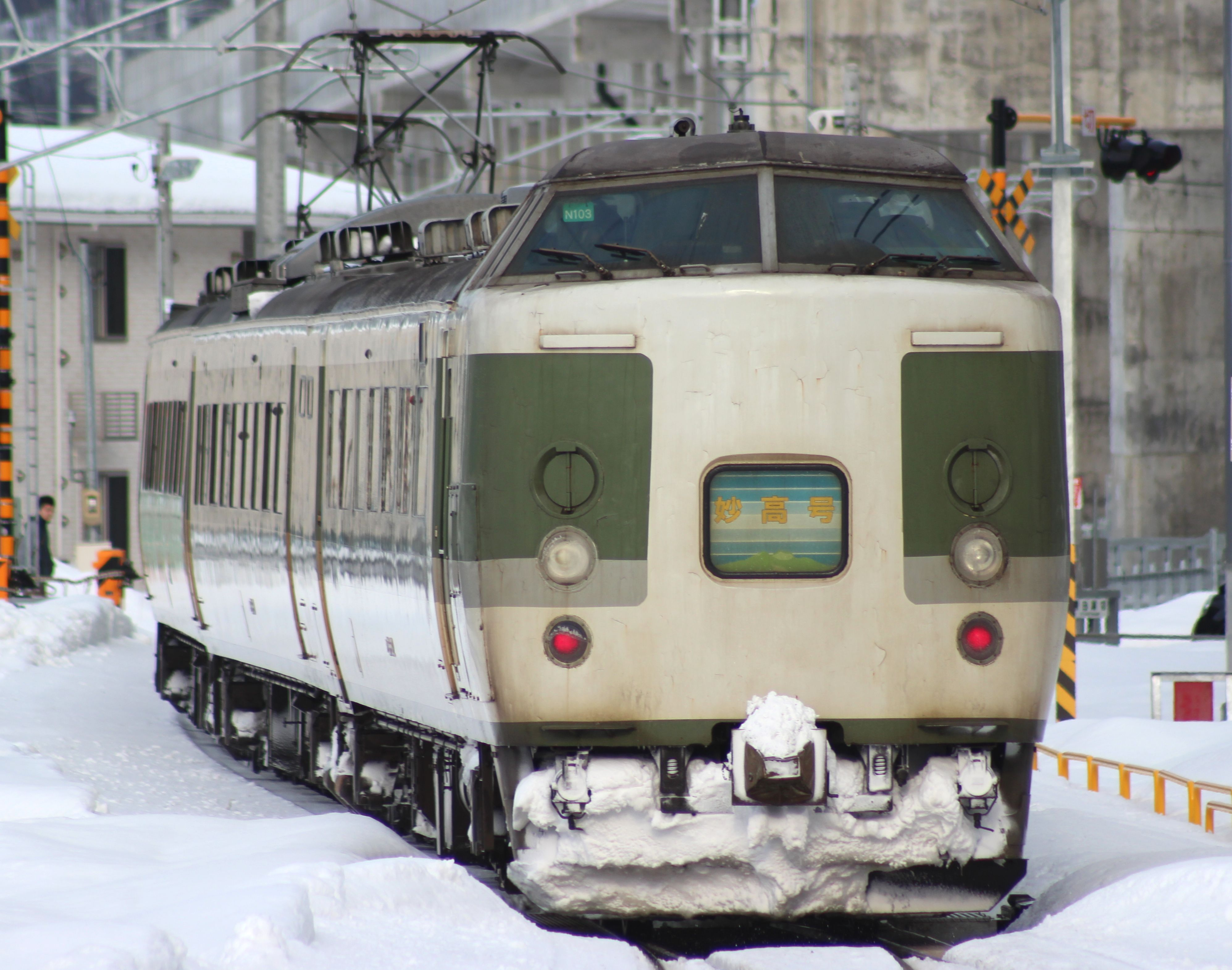
Set N103, January 2015

== Formation ==
Trains were formed as shown below, with car 1 at the Nagano end.

Car No.	1	2	3	4	5	6
Numbering	KuHa 189	MoHa 188	MoHa 189	MoHa 188	MoHa 189	KuHa 189

Set N101 had 183-1500 series driving cars.

== History ==
=== Original semi express ===
The Myōkō name was first used on 14 April 1958 for an overnight semi express service operating between Ueno in Tokyo and Naoetsu, via Nagano.

From the start of the timetable revision in October 1961, the former Shirakaba daytime service between Ueno and Nagano was extended to run to Naoetsu, and became the Myōkō 1 service.

=== Diesel express ===
From 1 December 1962, new KiHa 57 series 6-car diesel multiple unit (DMU) trains were introduced on the daytime Myōkō service, which was upgraded to "express" status. The overnight semi express service was meanwhile renamed Asama.

=== Electrification ===
Following the electrification of the Shinetsu Main Line between Takasaki and Naoetsu, new 165 series 8-car electric multiple unit (EMU) trains were introduced on Myōkō services from the start of the October 1966 timetable revision.

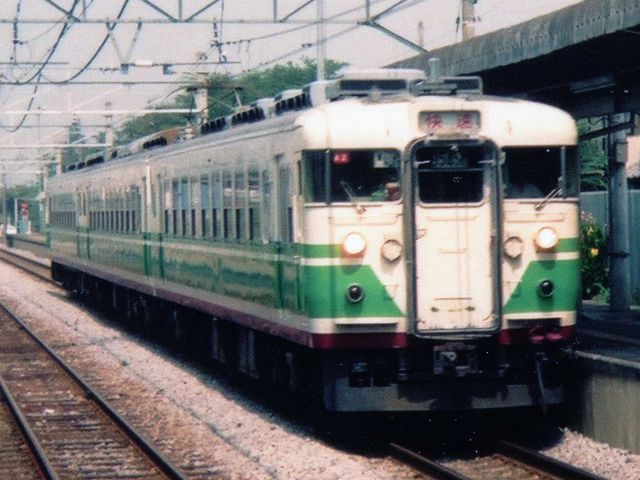
A Nagano-based 169 series EMU in 1991

With the expansion of daytime Hakusan and Asama services, daytime Myōkō services were cut back, and from the start of the November 1982 timetable revision, consisted of one overnight return working formed of 14 series locomotive-hauled sleeping car and seating accommodation coaches. From March 1985, the locomotive-hauled rolling stock was replaced with 169 series EMUs, and from March 1988, these sets were themselves replaced by 9-car 189 series EMUs also used on Asama services, with the operating route reduced to between Ueno and Nagano. These services were ultimately discontinued from 18 March 1993.

=== Rapid service (October 1997 - March 2015) ===
The Myōkō name was revived for new rapid services introduced from the start of the revised timetable on 1 October 1997, named Shinetsu Relay Myōkō, to provide connections at Nagano with the newly opened Nagano Shinkansen services. This was renamed Myōkō from 1 December 2002 following the discontinuation of the Minori limited express services which operated between Nagano and Niigata.

From the start of the revised timetable on 17 March 2012, two Myōkō services in each direction (services 3, 6, 7, 10) were discontinued, with the remaining three return workings operated using regular commuter rolling stock.

The remaining Myōkō services were finally discontinued from the start of the revised timetable on 14 March 2015, coinciding with the opening of the Hokuriku Shinkansen extension from Nagano to Kanazawa. The last train ran on 13 March 2015.

== See also ==
- List of named passenger trains of Japan
