= Asama (train) =

Japanese high-speed Shinkansen train service

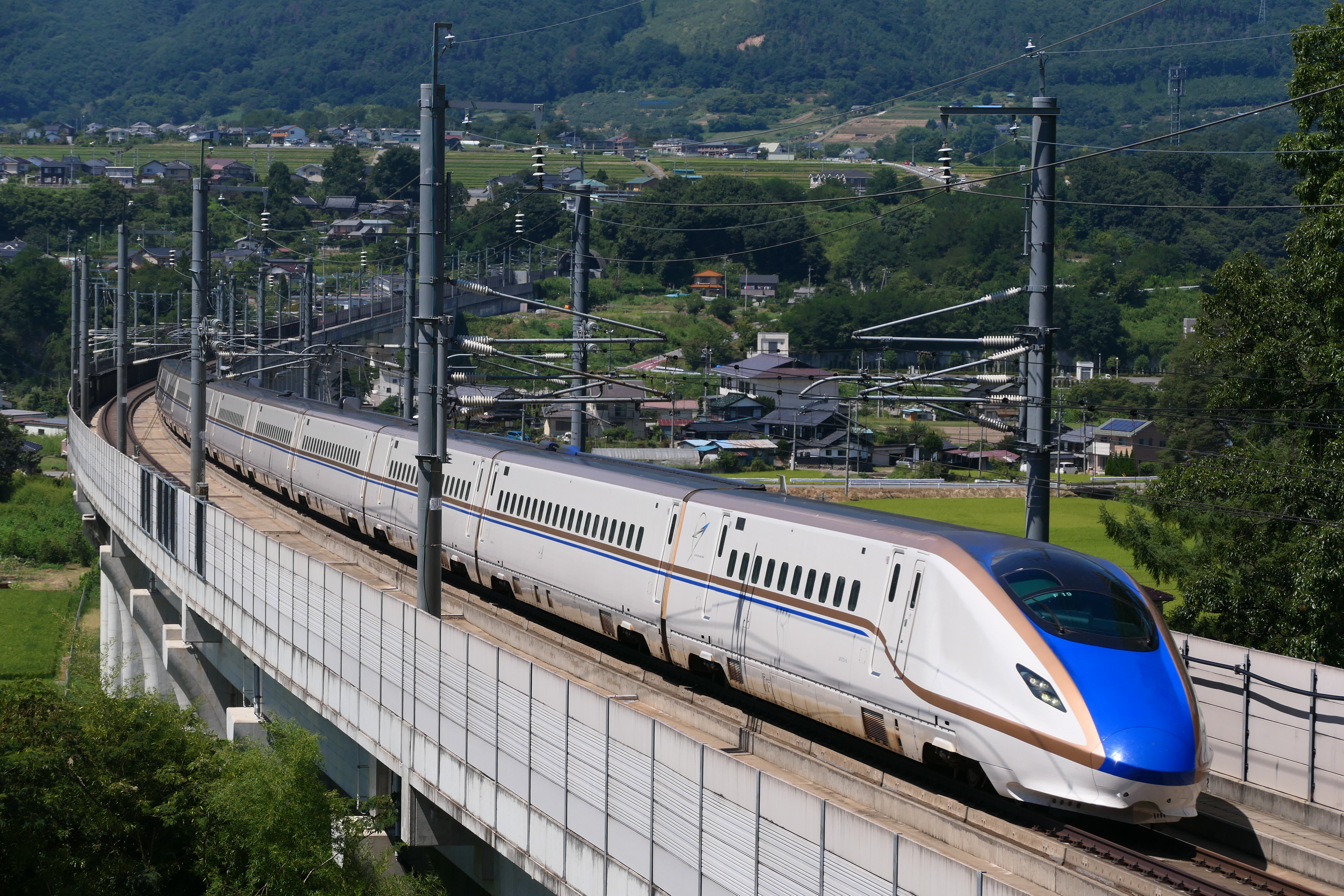
- E7 series set operating an Asama service near Sakudaira Station, August 2020

Overview
- Service type: Shinkansen (Local)
- Status: Operational
- Locale: Japan
- First service: Limited express: 1 March 1961; Shinkansen: 1 October 1997
- Current operator: JR East
- Former operator: Japanese National Railways

Route
- Termini: Tokyo; Nagano
- Service frequency: 16 round trips daily
- Line used: Hokuriku Shinkansen

On-board services
- Classes: Ordinary, Green, Gran Class
- Disabled access: Yes, cars 7 and 11
- Seating arrangements: 2+3 (Ordinary car); 2+2 (Green car); 1+2 (Gran Class)
- Catering facilities: Trolley service

Technical
- Rolling stock: E7 and W7 series
- Track gauge: 1,435 mm (4 ft 8 1/2 in) standard gauge
- Electrification: Overhead line: 25 kV 50 Hz AC; 25 kV 60 Hz AC
- Operating speed: 275 km/h (171 mph)

The Asama (Japanese: あさま) is a local high-speed Shinkansen service on the Hokuriku Shinkansen operated by the East Japan Railway Company (JR East). It operates between Tokyo and Nagano in Japan. The Shinkansen service was introduced in October 1997, although the name Asama was first used for a limited express service operated by Japanese National Railways (JNR) in 1961. The service is named after Mount Asama, an active volcano near Karuizawa, on the boundary between Gunma and Nagano prefectures.

== Operations ==
All 16 Asama services stop at Tokyo, Ueno, Ōmiya, Takasaki, Karuizawa, Sakudaira, Ueda, and Nagano. 11 of them make an additional stop at Kumagaya, Honjō-Waseda, and Annaka-Haruna.

== Train formations ==
Asama services are operated using 12-car E7 series or W7 series trainsets formed as shown below, with car 1 at the Tokyo end. Car 11 is a "Green" car, and car 12 is a "Gran Class" car with 2+1 seating. Unlike Kagayaki services, however, a dedicated attendant service is not provided in Gran Class cars on Asama services. All cars are no-smoking.

	1	2	3	4	5	6	7	8	9	10	11	12
Class	Non-reserved	Non-reserved	Non-reserved	Non-reserved	Non-reserved	Reserved	Reserved	Reserved	Reserved	Reserved	Green	Gran Class
Facilities	Toilets		Toilets, phone		Toilets		Wheelchair space, accessible toilet, phone		Toilets		Wheelchair space, accessible toilet	Toilets

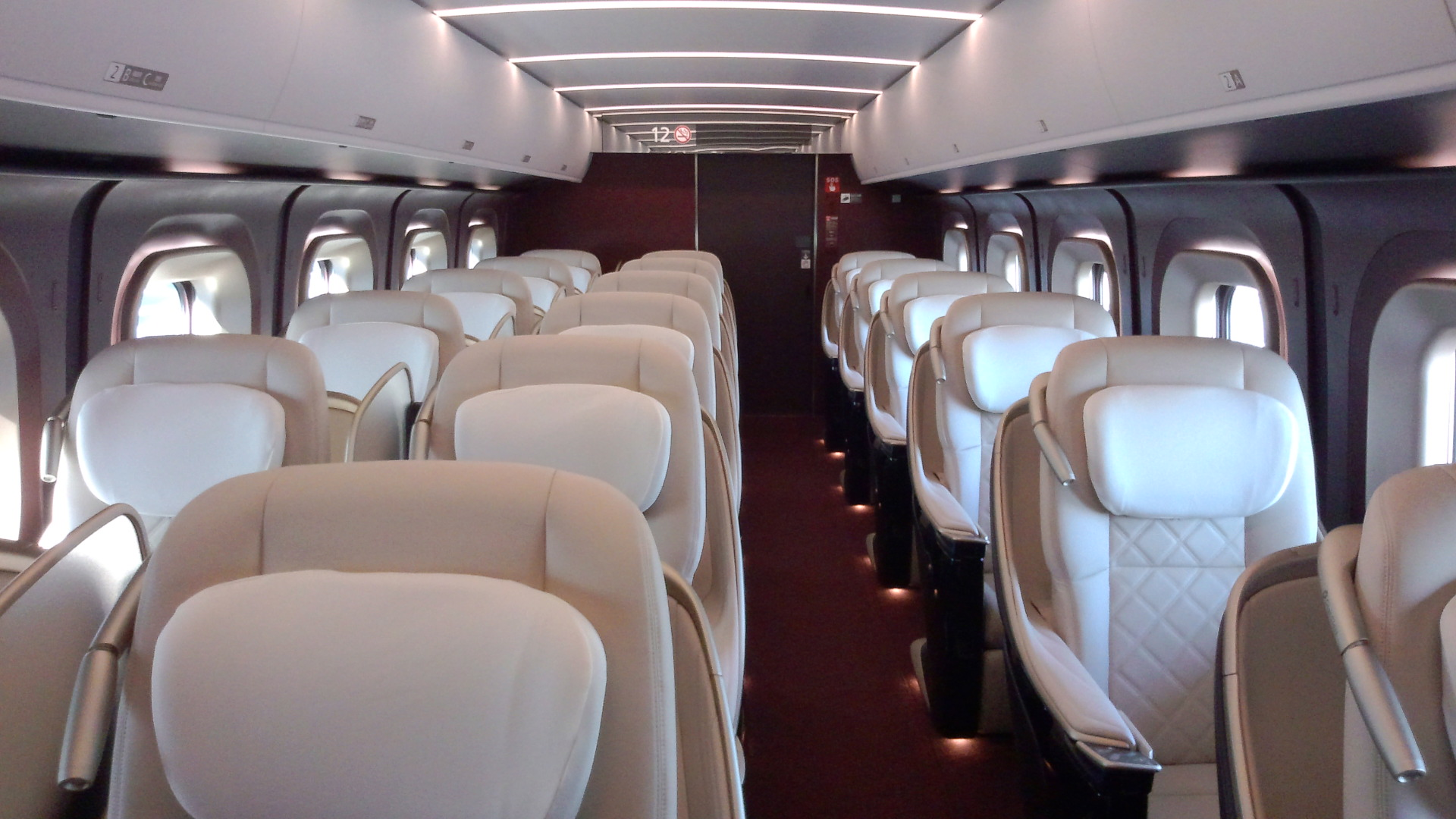
Interior of an E7 series Gran Class car 12

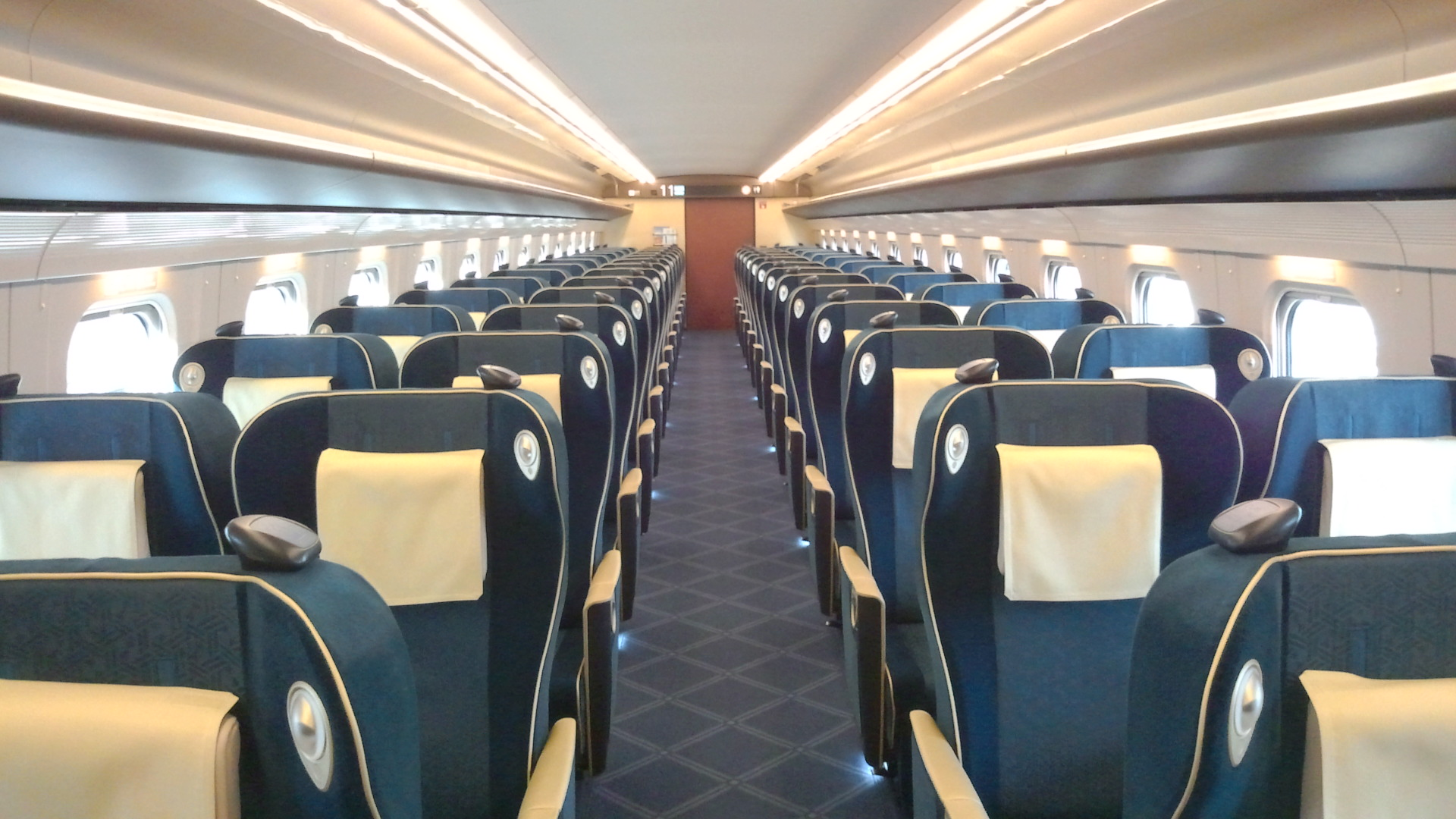
Interior of an E7 series Green car 11

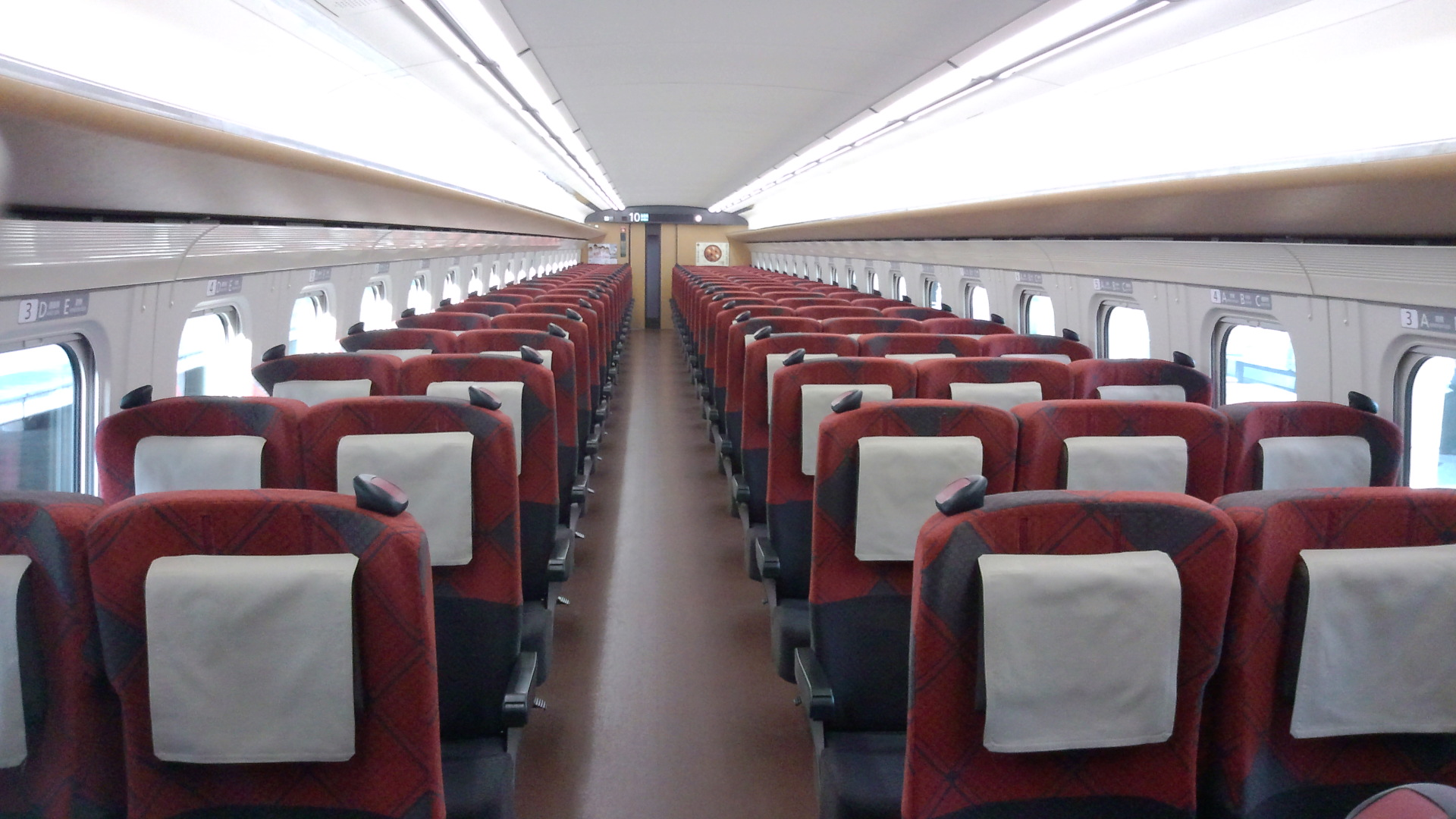
Interior of an E7 series ordinary-class car 10

== Rolling stock ==
- E7 series 12-car F sets (since 15 March 2014)
- W7 series 12-car W sets (since 14 March 2015)

Services were initially operated using a dedicated fleet of fourteen 8-car E2 series "N" sets based at Nagano Shinkansen Depot. Trains are designed to maintain speeds of 260 km/h (160 mph) on the 30 km continuous gradient of 30‰ between Takasaki and Karuizawa.

New E7 series 12-car sets, also based at Nagano Depot, were introduced on Asama services from the start of the revised timetable on 15 March 2014. These trains included "Gran Class" seating arranged 2+1 abreast. E7 series trainsets were initially used on seven return services daily, with a further four return workings added from 19 April 2014. JR West W7 series 12-car sets, based at Hakusan Depot, were introduced from the start of the revised timetable on 14 March 2015.

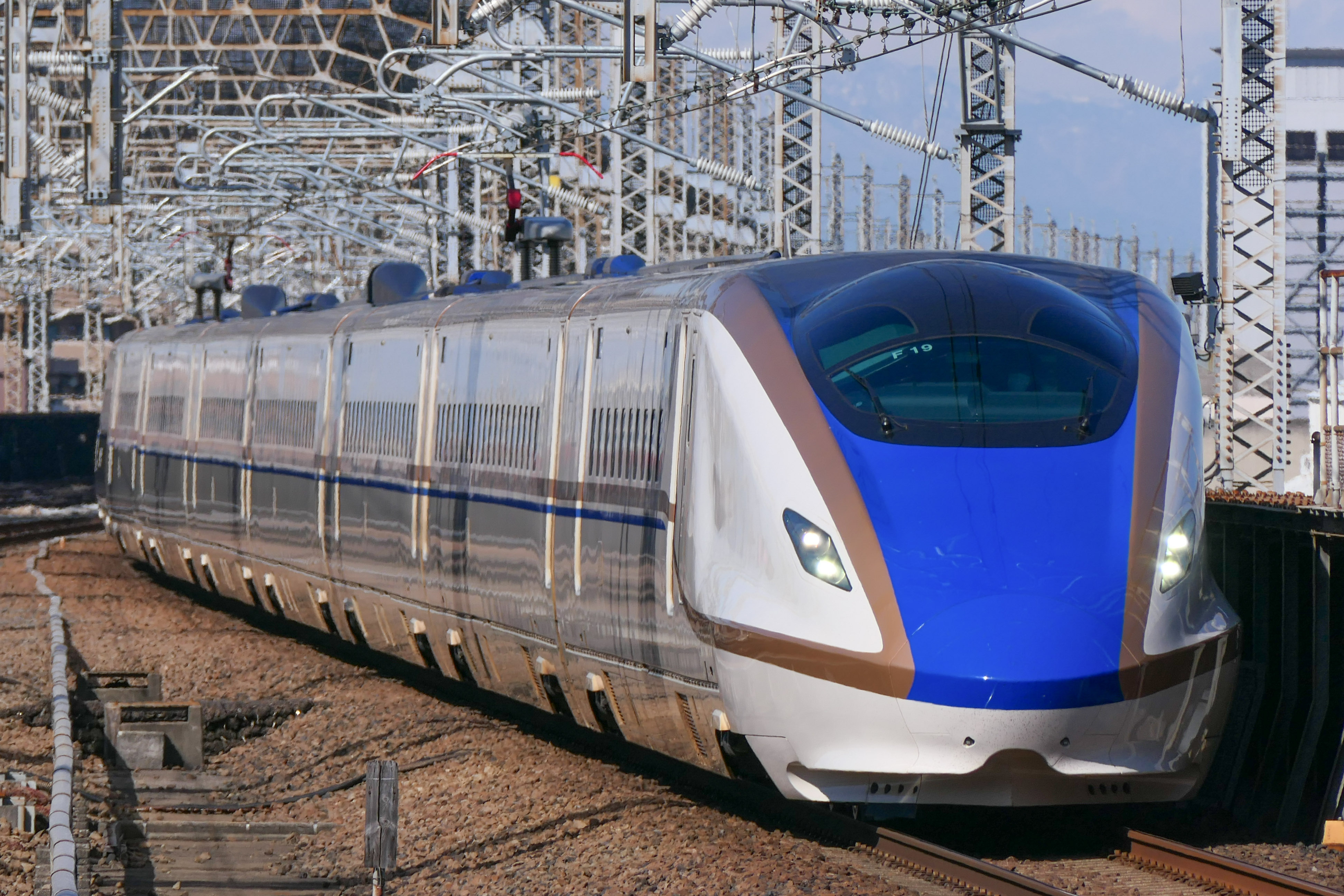
An E7 series set on an Asama service in February 2021

=== Former rolling stock ===
- E2 series 8-car J sets (from 1 October 1997 until 2002)
- E2 series 8-car N sets (from 1 October 1997 until 31 March 2017)
- 200 series 12-car F80 set (February 1998 only)
- E4 series 8-car P50/P80 sets, as Max Asama (22 July 2001 - 15 September 2003)
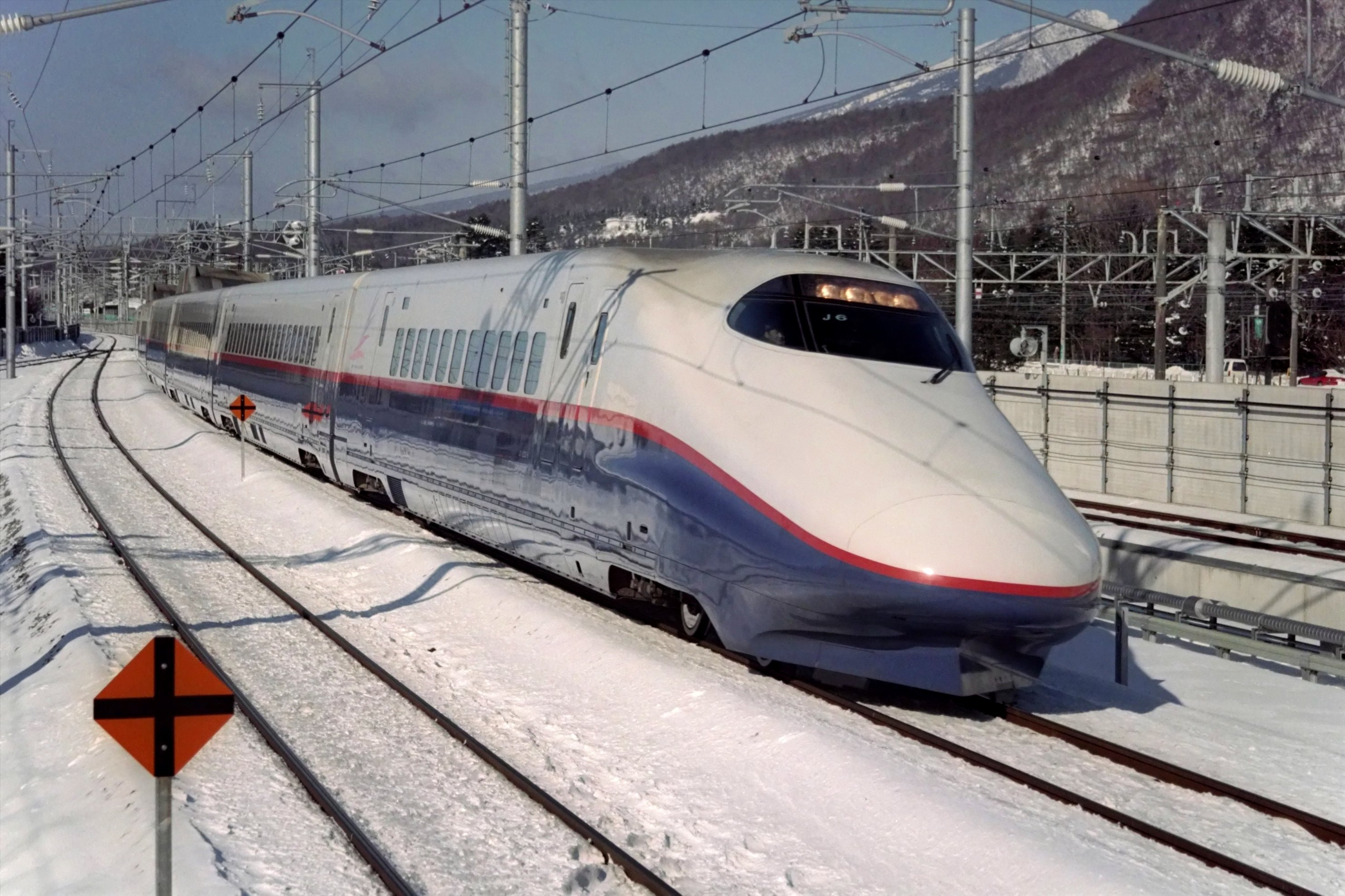
An 8-car Nagano Shinkansen E2 series set J6 arriving at Karuizawa Station on a Tokyo-bound Asama service in February 1998

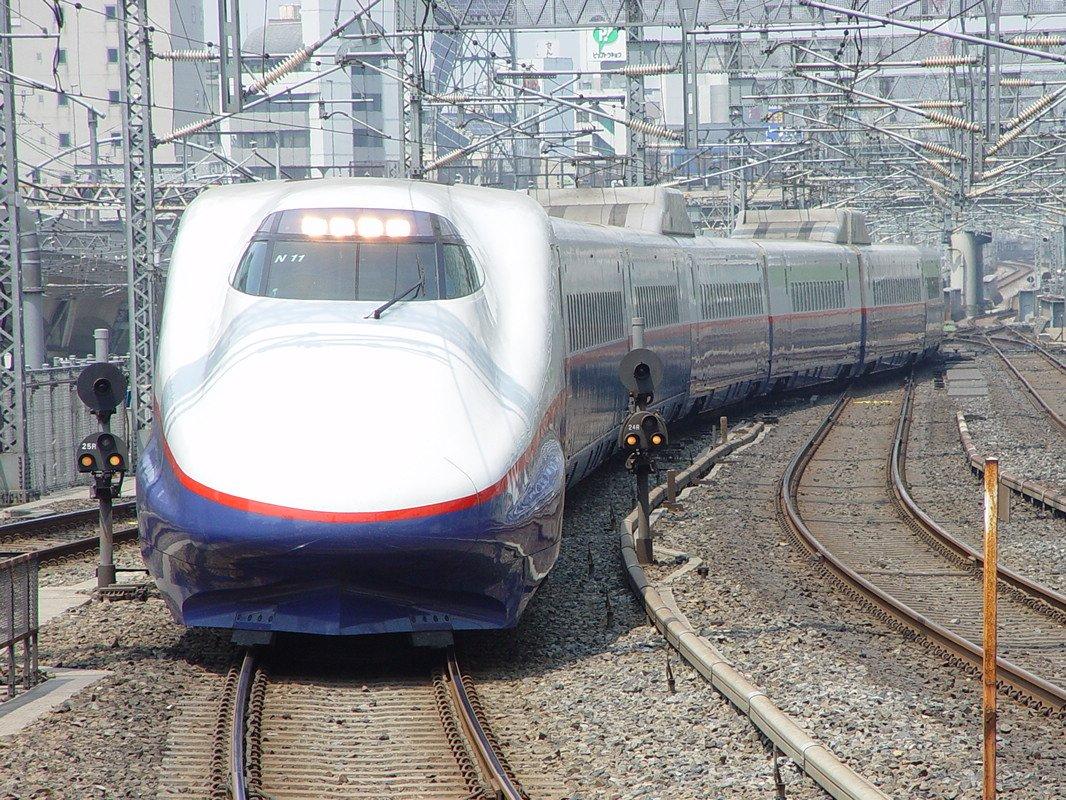
A JR East E2 series set N11 arriving at Tokyo Station on an Asama service in June 2002

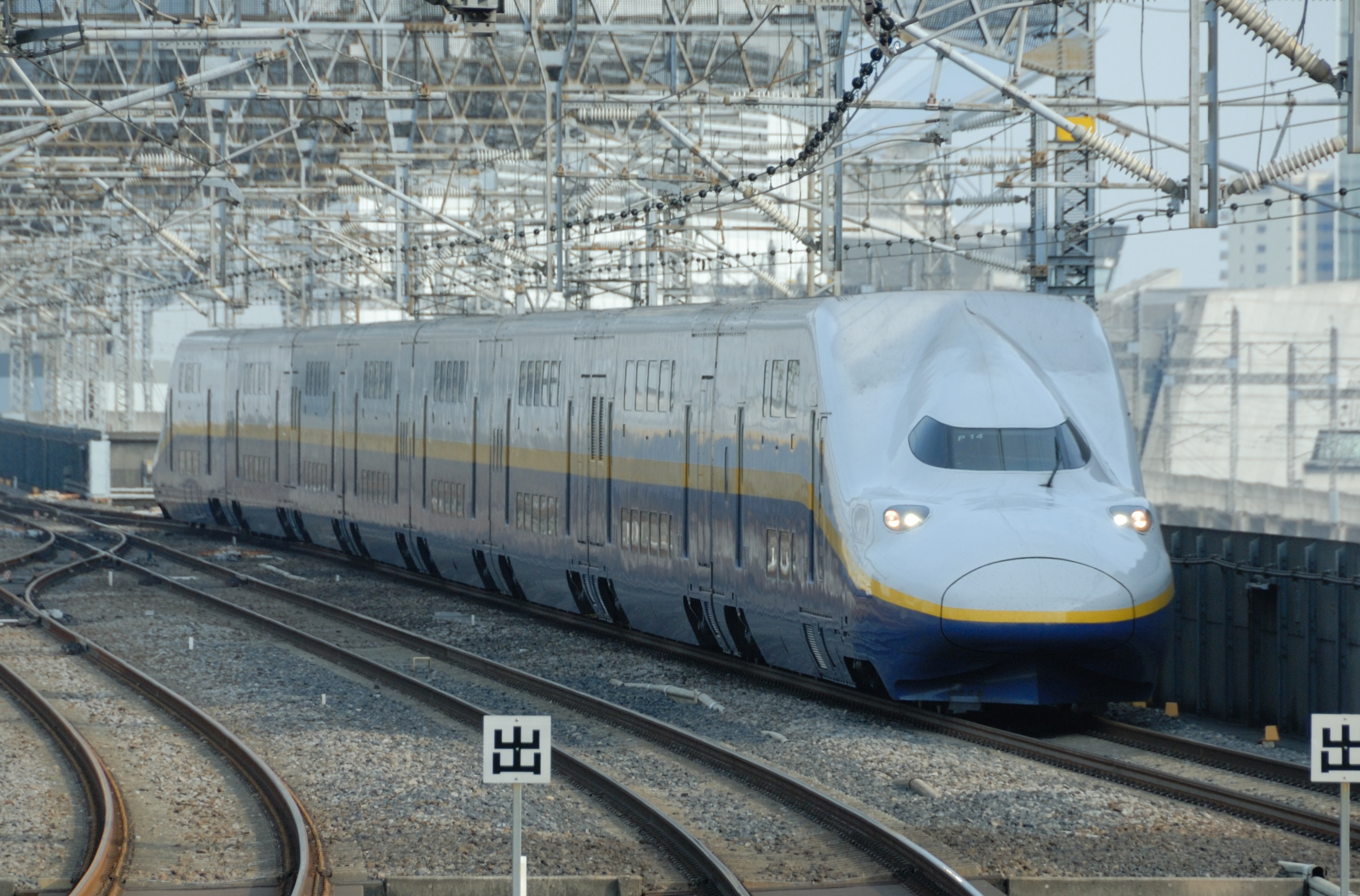
An E4 series set

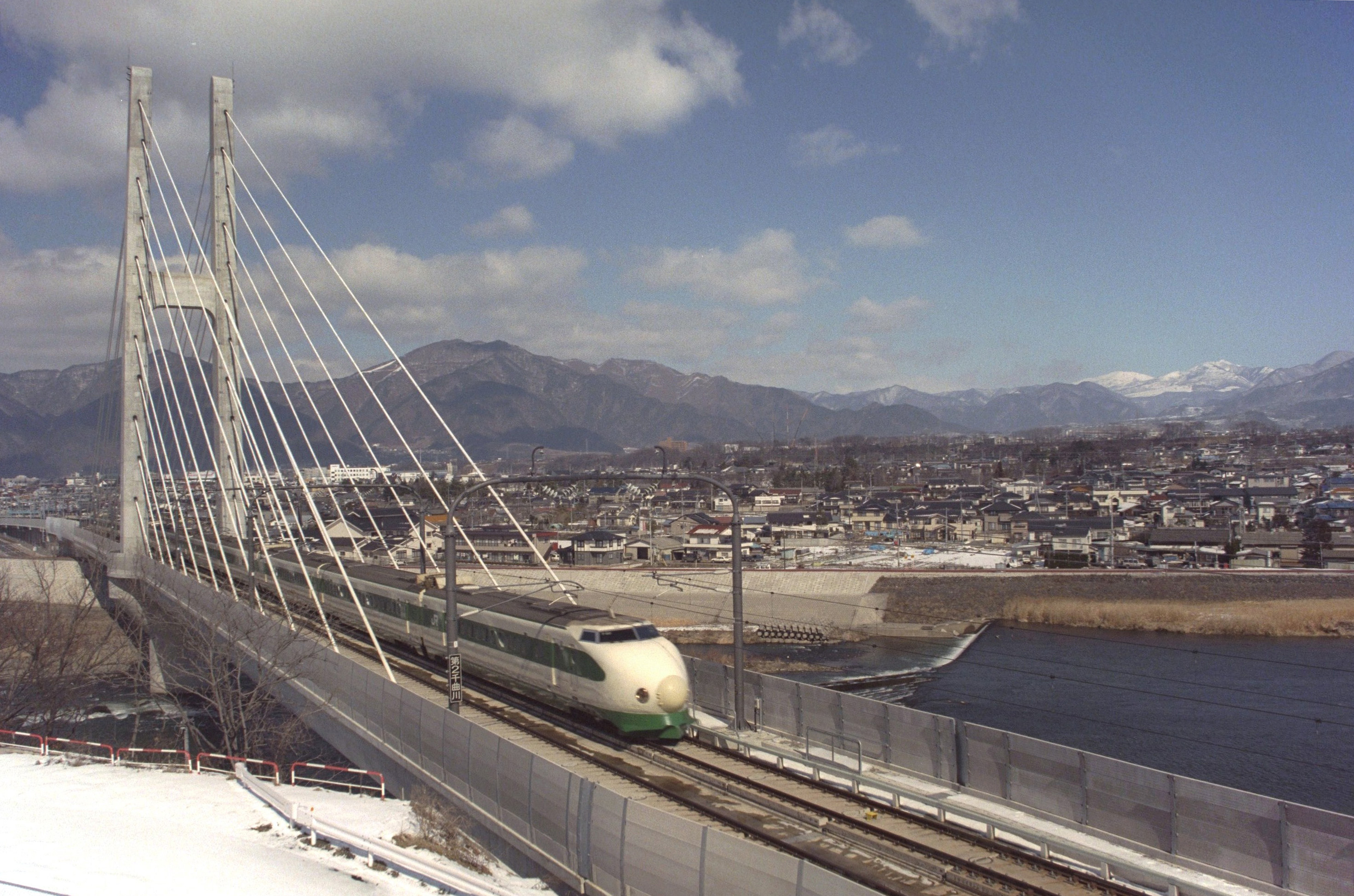
Modified set F80 on a Nagano Shinkansen Asama service in February 1998

=== Pre-shinkansen ===
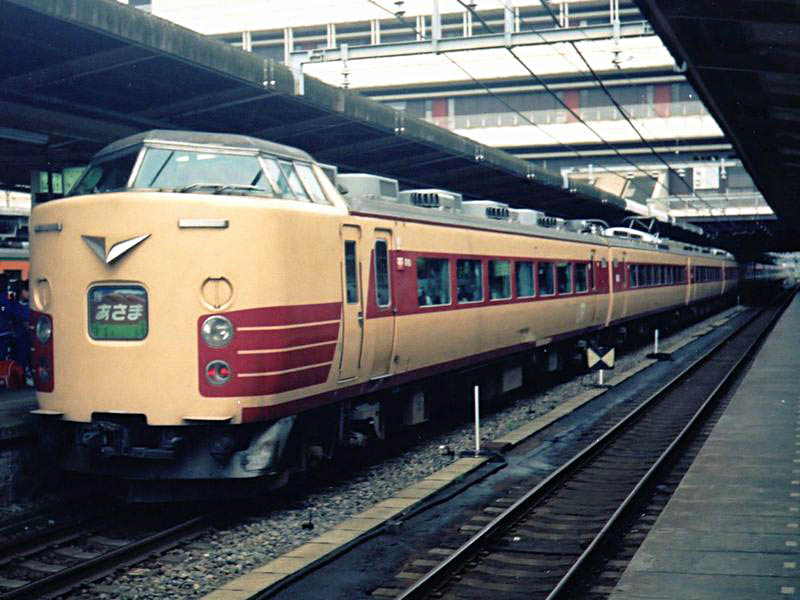
189 series Asama service at Ōmiya Station in 1991

- 181 series EMU sets (October 1966–)
- 189 series EMU 9/11/12-car sets (October 1975–September 1997)
- 489 series EMU sets

== History ==
=== Semi-express Asama ===
The name Asama was first introduced on 1 March 1961 for semi-express (準急, junkyū) services operating between Nagano and Niigata. This service operated until 30 November 1962, after which the train was renamed Akakura (赤倉). From 1 December 1962, the name was used for the semi-express services operating between Ueno in Tokyo and Nagano on the Shinetsu Line. This service continued until 30 September 1963, after which the train was renamed Maruike (丸池).

=== Limited express Asama ===
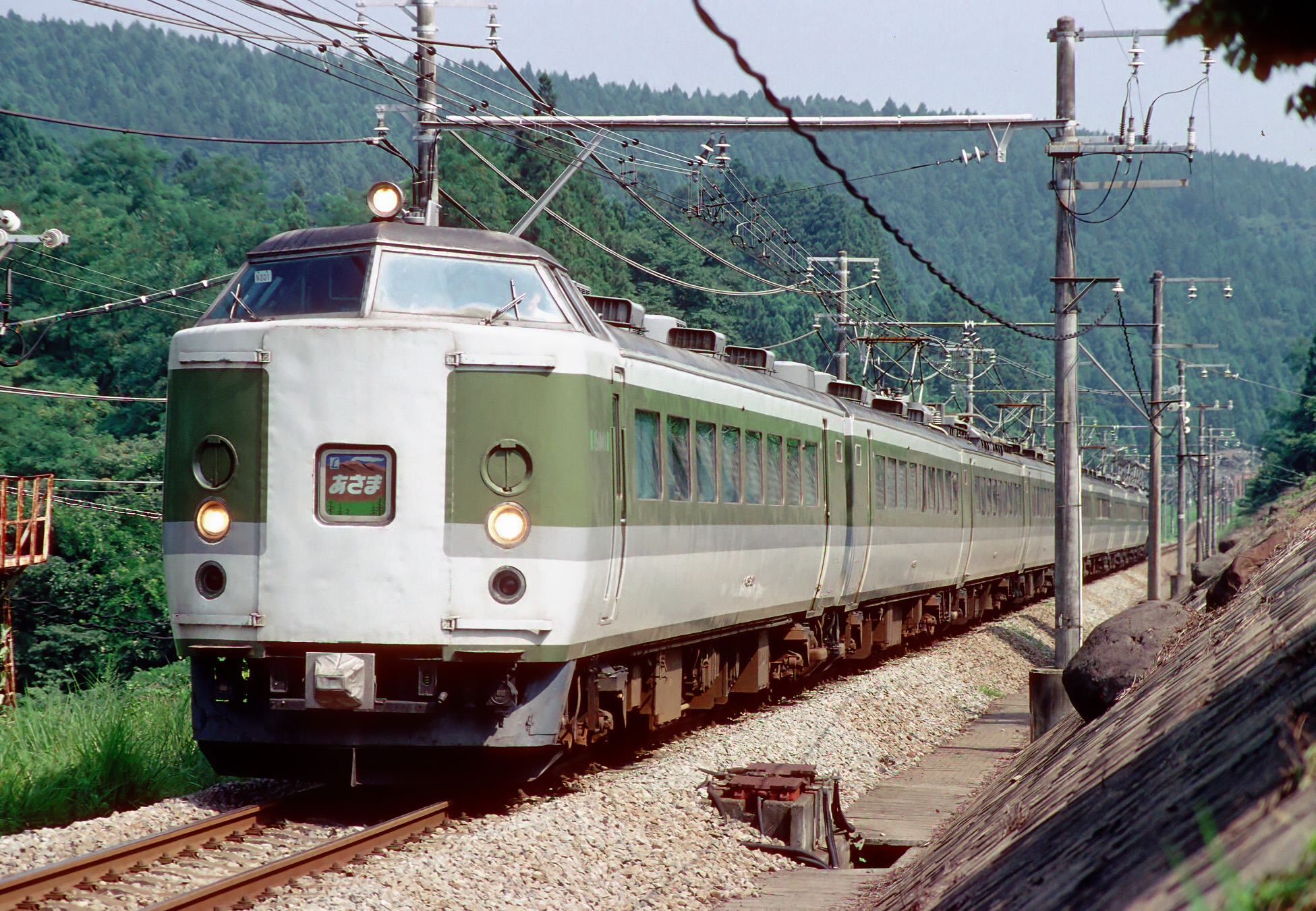
489 series in Asama livery on the Shinetsu Main Line, August 1997

After a gap of three years, the name Asama was re-introduced from 1 October 1966 on the Limited express services operating between Ueno and Nagano or Naoetsu. By the late 1990s, there were 29 workings daily in each direction, formed of 9- or 11-car 189 series EMU formations. During the busy summer periods, a second Green car was sometimes added to increase formations to 12 cars.

The typical 11-car 189 series formation in 1995 was as shown below, with car 1 at the Ueno end.

Car No.	1	2	3	4	5	6	7	8	9	10	11
Numbering	KuHa 189	MoHa 188	MoHa 189	MoHa 188	MoHa 189	SaRo 189	MoHa 188	MoHa 189	MoHa 188	MoHa 189	KuHa 189
Accommodation	Reserved	Reserved	Reserved	Reserved	Reserved	Green	Reserved	Non-reserved	Non-reserved	Non-reserved	Non-reserved

=== Shinkansen Asama ===
From 1 October 1997, the name Asama was used for the services on the newly opened Nagano Shinkansen (absorbed into the Hokuriku Shinkansen from 2015), operating between Tokyo and Nagano.

During the 1998 Winter Olympics in February 1998, additional services were provided using one specially modified 200 series train (set F80), limited to a maximum speed of 210 km/h. Four E4 series double-decker "Max" trains (sets P51/52 and P81/82) were also specially built for seasonal use on the Nagano Shinkansen as Max Asama services, but only two (sets P81 and P82) are capable of travelling as far as Nagano because the line west of Karuizawa runs on a 60 Hz power supply, unlike the rest of the line that runs on a 50 Hz power supply.

From the start of the revised timetable on 10 December 2005, Asama services were made entirely no-smoking.

The services operated using E2 series eight-car sets (until 31 March 2017) were formed as follows. Car 7 was a "Green" (first class) car. All cars were no-smoking.

Car No.	1	2	3	4	5	6	7	8
Class	Non-reserved	Non-reserved	Non-reserved	Non-reserved	Reserved	Reserved	Green	Reserved
Facilities	Toilet		Toilet	Phone	Toilet		Toilet, wheelchair space	Wheelchair space, phone

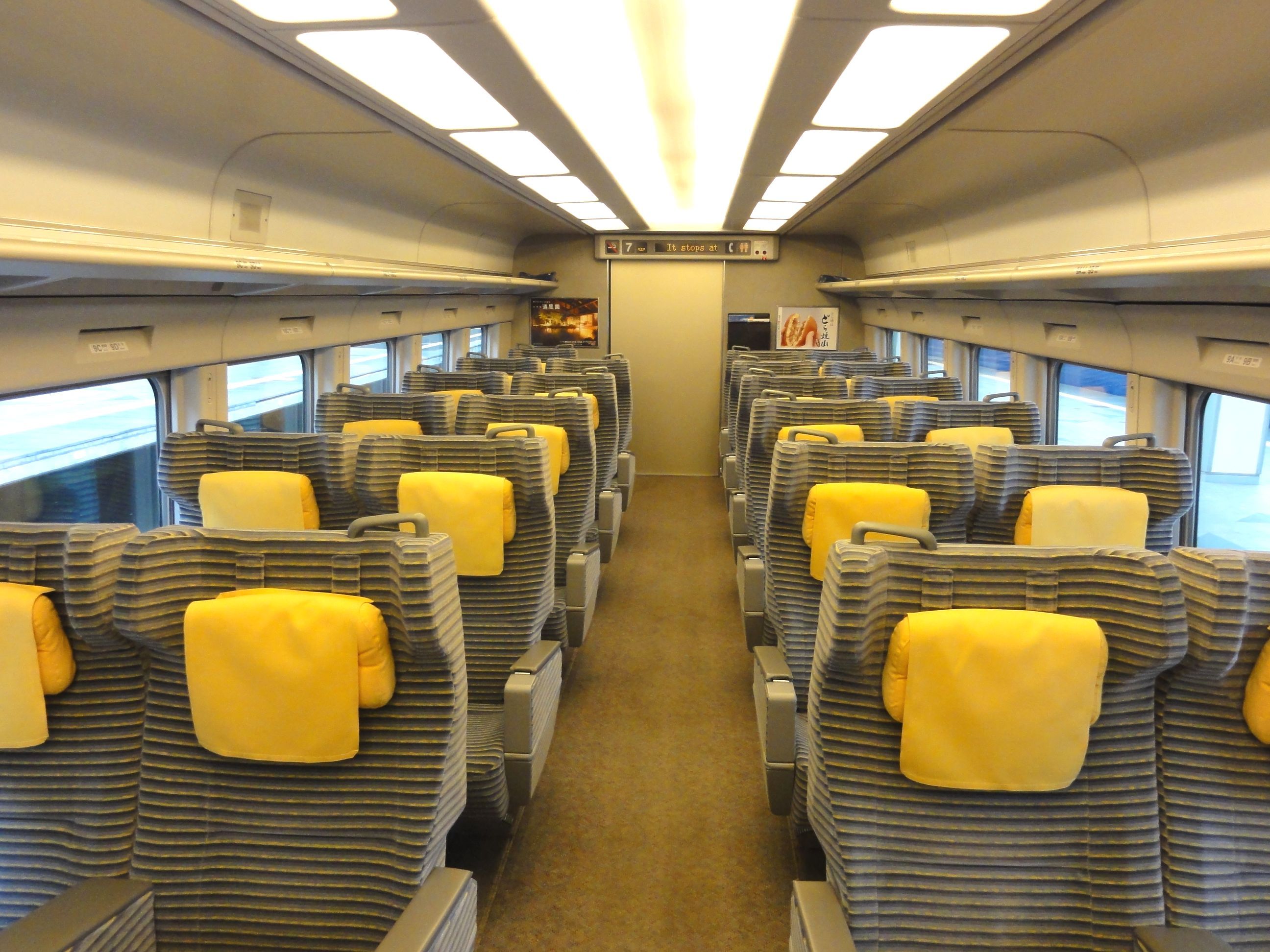
Interior of an E2 series Green car

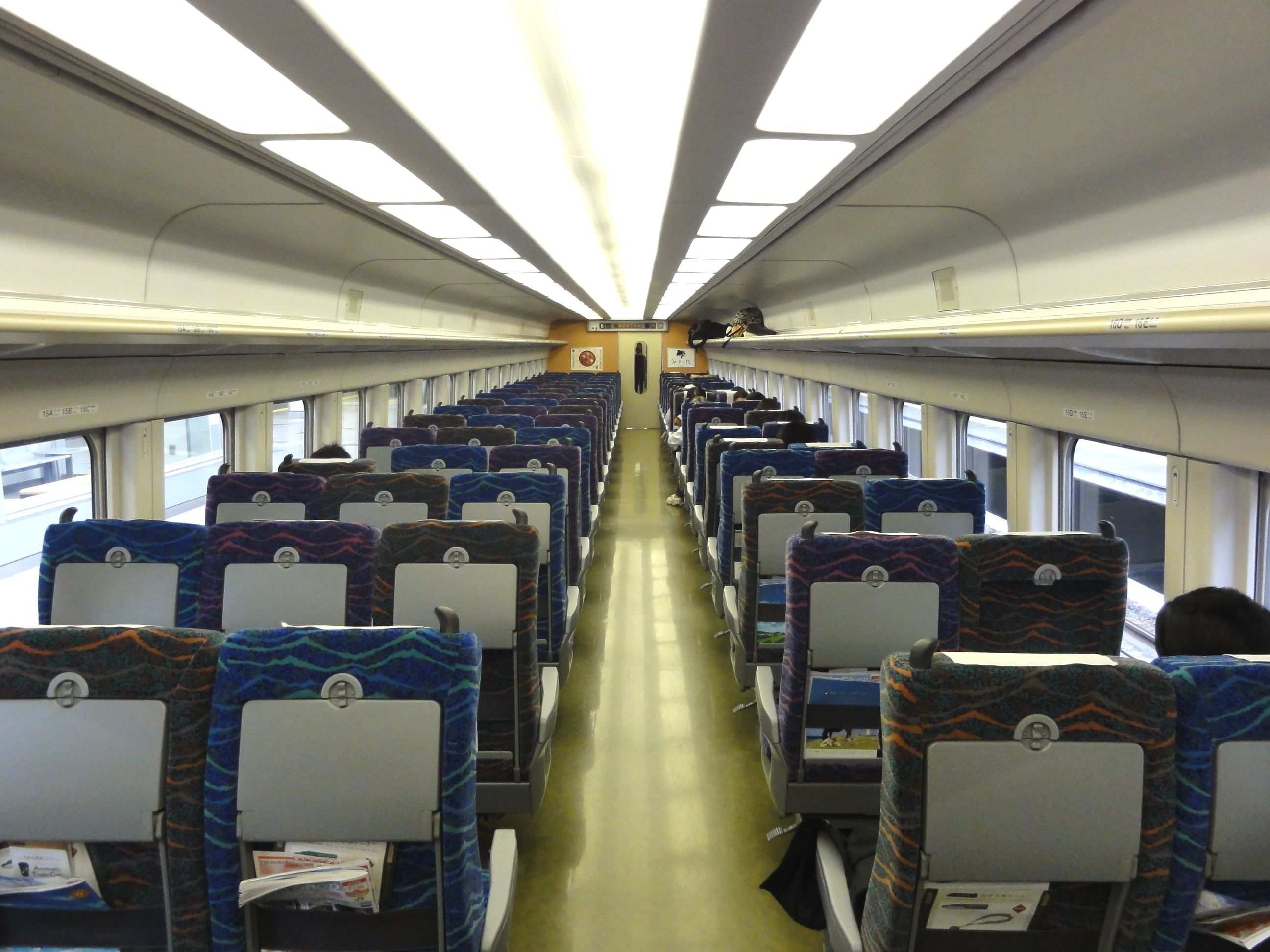
Interior of an E2 series ordinary-class car

From the start of the revised timetable on 15 March 2014, new E7 series 12-car trainsets were introduced on Asama services. Initially used on seven return services daily, this number was increased to eleven return services daily from 19 April 2014.

Following the opening of the Hokuriku Shinkansen extension beyond Nagano to Kanazawa in 2015, the Asama name continued to be used for those services operating between Tokyo and Nagano, with some services still operated by 8-car E2 series trains.

The last services operated using eight-car E2 series trainsets ran on 31 March 2017, from which date all Asama services were formed of E7 and W7 series trainsets.

== See also ==
- List of named passenger trains of Japan
