= Manju Sharma =

Manju Sharma may refer to:

- Manju Sharma (biologist) (born 1940), Indian biologist
- Manju Sharma (politician), Indian politician from Jaipur
- Manju Brijnandan Sharma, Indian actress in F.I.R.
