= Monju (train) =

Japanese limited express train service

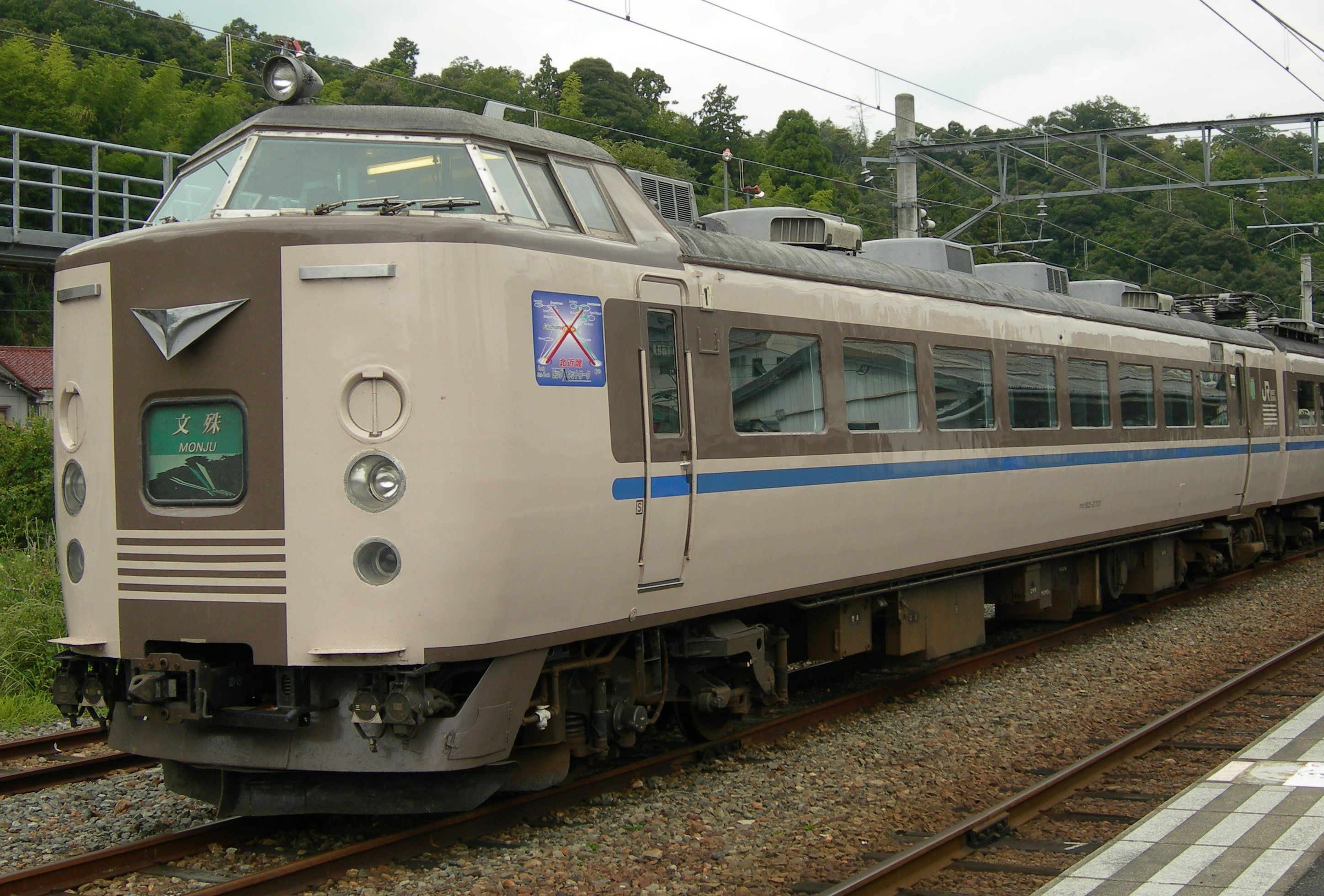
- 183 series EMU on a Monju service at Amanohashidate Station, August 2009

Overview
- Service type: Limited express
- First service: 1996
- Last service: 2011
- Current operator(s): JR West

Route
- Line(s) used: Fukuchiyama Line, Kitakinki Tango Railway

Technical
- Rolling stock: 183 series
- Operating speed: 120 km/h (75 mph) (max.)

The Monju (文殊) was a limited express train service operated by West Japan Railway Company (JR West) in Japan from 1996 until March 2011. It operated between Shin-Osaka and Amanohashidate via the Fukuchiyama Line and Kitakinki Tango Railway, and was one of the services that made up JR West's "Kitakinki Big X Network" in northern Kansai.

== Service pattern ==
As of December 2010, there was one return Monju service daily between Shin-Osaka and Amanohashidate, stopping at the following stations.

Shin-Osaka – Osaka – Amagasaki – Takarazuka – Sanda – Sasayamaguchi – Kaibara – Fukuchiyama – Ōe – Miyazu – Amanohashidate

== Rolling stock ==
This service was operated with 4-car 183 series electric multiple unit trains based at Fukuchiyama Depot. Green (first class) car accommodation was provided in car 1.

== History ==
The Monju service was introduced in March 1996.

From 18 March 2007, all cars were made non-smoking.

Monju services were discontinued from the start of the 12 March 2011 timetable revision.
