= Manju Manikuttan =

Indian beautician and social worker (born 1976)

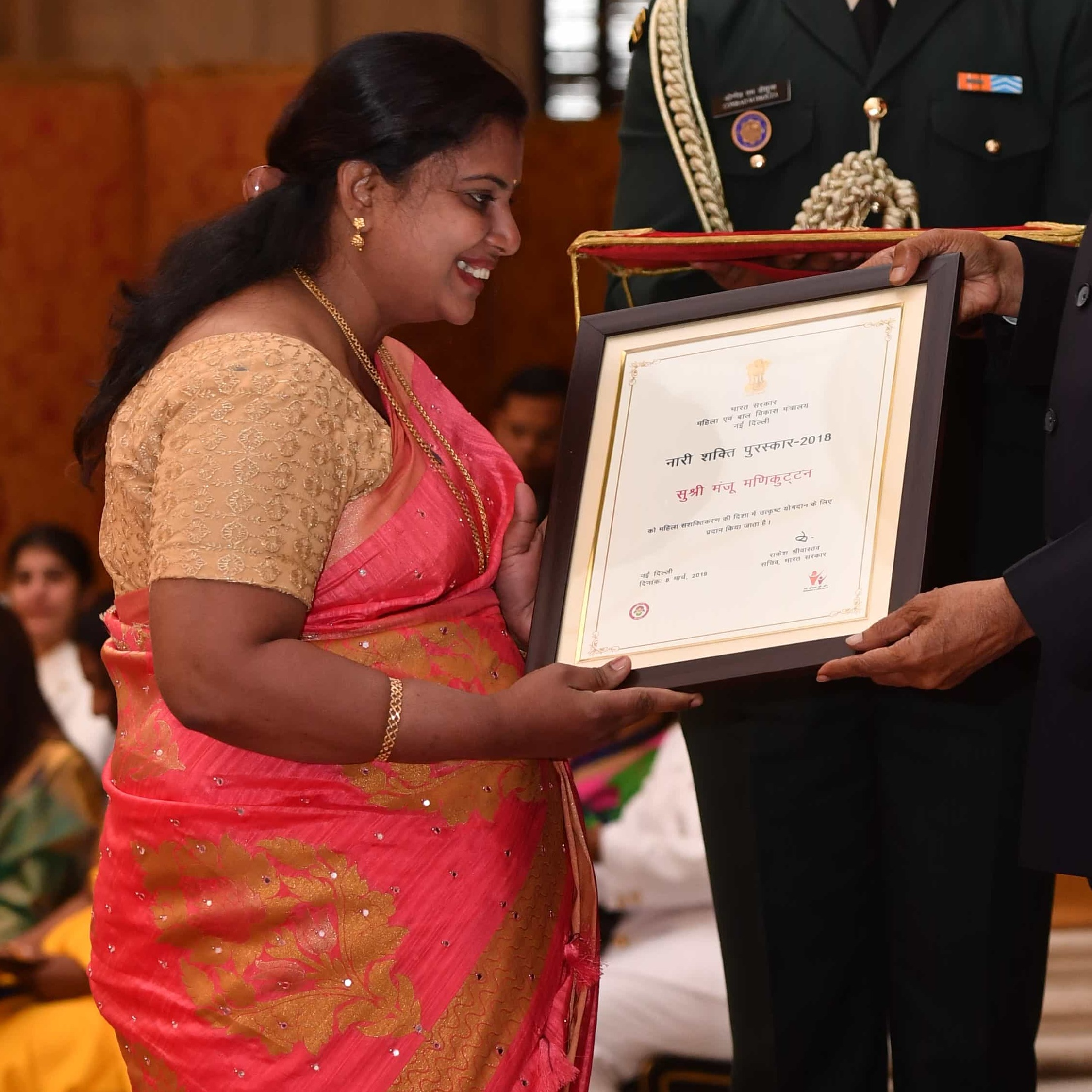
- Born: c. 1976; Kerala, India
- Occupation(s): Beautician and social worker
- Organization: Navayugam Samskarika Vedi Dammam
- Spouse: Padmanabhan Manikuttan
- Children: Abhinav Manikuttan, Abhirami Manikuttan
- Awards: Nari Shakti Puraskar

Manju Manikuttan (born c. 1976) is an Indian beautician and social worker. She rescued lot of expatriate workers, who faced legal, health and work related issues in Saudi Arabia. She was awarded the Nari Shakti Puraskar, the highest award for women in India, in 2019.

== Life ==
Manikuttan was born and raised in the Ernakulam district in Kerala. After marrying Padmanabhan Manikuttan and having two kids (Abhinav and Abhirami), she moved to Khobar city of Saudi Arabia in 2011, along with her expatriate husband, and started working in a beauty parlor as beautician.

Her life was changed when she met Safiya Ajith, famous social worker and Vice President of the expatriate Indian organization Navayugam Cultural Forum in Saudi Arabia. Ajith encouraged her to enter social service and she became an assistant of Ajith, in solving the issues of ladies in the deportation centre. After one year, Ajith died due to cancer. Navayugam assigned Manikuttan to take the responsibilities handled by Ajith. Manikuttan took the whole responsibilities of the ladies' deportation centre and was actively involved in solving the cases of women inmates. Her husband Padmanabhan Manikuttan is helping her in all her social activities.

Manikuttan solved hundreds of cases of women, who came to Saudi Arabia to work as housemaids, domestic workers, hospital workers, beauticians, etc. and ended up with issues with their sponsors, health, legal & labour problems, and visas. She helped hundreds of women to go back to India, after finishing all legal formalities. The Indian Embassy recognized her as a committed social volunteer and gave her authorization to interfere in any Indian women workers' related cases. Ladies deportation authorities and Saudi officials had a very high opinion about her and they helped her in many complicated labour and visa cases, which needed their special help.

She was given the Nari Shakti Puraskar award for her social work in 2019. This was given by the President of India Ram Nath Kovind at the Presidential Palace in New Delhi on International Women's Day in 2019. It is an Indian "national award in recognition for exceptional work for women's empowerment". She met the minister Maneka Gandhi and afterwards she met the Prime Minister Narendra Modi. She was the only expatriate woman who received the award that year.

In 2020 the New Indian Express reported the example of "Chandrika" who had left India for Saudi Arabia to work as an accountant in a hospital. When she arrived she discovered that she had been misled and the job she was assigned was as a housemaid. Chandrika stayed in the job for five months but finally her employer took her to the airport. Her situation led to a fight and she could have been arrested. However, Manikuttan was summoned and she took her back to her own home where she stayed until a new route home could be organised.

Her work as a volunteer is part of the work of the Navayugam Samskarika Vedi organization. Presently she is the Central Committee vice president of Navayugam. Over the years she has worked for hundreds of expatriates who are generally housemaids recruited from Telangana, Andhra Pradesh, Tamil Nadu and Kerala. She is supported in her work by the Indian Embassy in Riyadh, and Saudi authorities including the Deportation Centre in Dammam and Navayugam. She has won many awards from various organizations, establishments and NGOs for her social work. She still continues her social work in Saudi Arabia.
