= Manjunath =

Manjunath or Manjunatha is another name for the Hindu deity Shiva. It may also refer to:

== People ==
- B. C. Manjunath, Indian classical musician/percussionist
- Master Manjunath (Manjunath Nayaker) (born 1976), an Indian actor and public relations professional
- M R Manjunath, Indian politician
- Mysore Manjunath, Indian violinist
- Shanmugam Manjunath (1978–2005), Indian marketing manager murdered for his stand against corruption
- Manjunath Kunnur, former MP of Dharwad South

== Other ==
- Manjunath (film), a 2014 Indian drama film
- Sri Manjunatha (film), a 2001 Indian film
- Dharmasthala Temple, a temple in Dharmasthala, Karnataka
- Kadri Manjunath Temple, in Mangalore
