= Manti =

Manti or Manty may refer to:

== Places ==
- Manti, Iowa, a defunct Mormon settlement
- Manti, Utah, a city, named for the city of Manti in the Book of Mormon
- Manti National Forest, formerly Manti Forest Reserve, in Colorado and Utah
- Manti (crater), on Mars
- City of Manti, the chief city in land of Manti, in the Book of Mormon
- Hill of Manti, near city of Zarahemla, in the Book of Mormon
- Land of Manti, most southerly land of the Nephites, in the Book of Mormon

== People ==
- Manti Te'o (born 1991), American football player
- Harri Mänty (born 1971), Swedish guitarist

== Other uses ==
- Manti (food), a dumpling originally from Central Asia and Mongolia
- Manti Utah Temple, a Mormon temple in Manti, Utah
- Manti High School, Manti, Utah
- Mänti, a constructed language created by Daniel Tammet (born 1979)
- Manty, a margarine brand - see BRF S.A.

== See also ==
- Mandu (disambiguation)
- Manties, in fiction the residents of the Star Kingdom, later Empire, of Manticore in the Honor Harrington series - see Honorverse
