= Manju Qamaraidullāhī =

Manju Qamar Yadullāhī (1908–1983) was an Urdu dramatist, playwright and a poet, born in Channapatna, Karnataka state of India and established his career in Hyderabad Deccan. He wrote various plays in Urdu of social and historical importance. Most of his plays were staged at the Ravindra Bharti, the center of performing arts in Hyderabad, AP. During the reign of the Nizam the 7th of Hyderabad Deccan he staged various plays and one of his plays was honoured by the Nizam as the guest. Some of his plays were broadcast by All India Radio's Hyderabad station in their primetime Urdu feature Navrang, in the early 1980s his drama Bhadur Shah Zafar became the first Urdu drama to be broadcast in three episodes by All India Radio, Hyderabad.

== Bibliography ==
- Syed Mahmud Mehdi. Manju Qamar, Ek azim drama nigar. Nigah Publications, 1979.
- Syed Mumtaz Mehdi. Manju Qamaraidullahi (منجو قمر, سيد ممتاز مهدى يدالهى), 2005.
- Manju Qamaraidullāhī (منجو قمر); Sayyid Mumtāz Mahdī. Rang o rabāb : majmūʻah-yi kalām (رنگ و رباب : مجموعه كلام). Hyderabad: Manjū Qamar Memorial Committee, 2005.
- Manju Qamaraidullāhī. Ḍhaltā sūraj barḥtā sāyah. Ḥyderabad: Nigāh Publications, 1969.
- Manju Qamaraidullāhī. Mirzā Ghālib: Urdū Drāmā. Hyderabad: Nigah Publications, 1969.
- Manju Qamaraidullāhī. Kaccī kalī, tez kiran. Hyderabad: Nigah Publications, 1969.
- Manju Qamaraidullāhī. Sastā joban, mahangā saz. Hyderabad: Nigah Publications, 1969.
- Manju Qamaraidullāhī. Ek dhamākā dhīmī āg. Hyderabad: Nigah Publications, 1969.
- Manju Qamaraidullāhī. Jaltī javanī. Hyderabad: Nigah Publications, 1969.
- Manju Qamaraidullāhī. Nīl Kī nāgin. Hyderabad: Nigah Publications, 1970.
- Manju Qamaraidullāhī. Jhānsī kī Rānī; Tārīk̲h̲ī ḍrāmah. Hyderabad: Nigah Publications, 1969.
- Manju Qamaraidullāhī. Pīne ke baʻd : Soshīl ḍrāmah. Hyderabad: Nigah Publications, 1969.
