= Terado Ōtsuka Kofun =

Kofun period keyhole-shaped burial mound in Japan

- 寺戸大塚古墳 (Japanese)
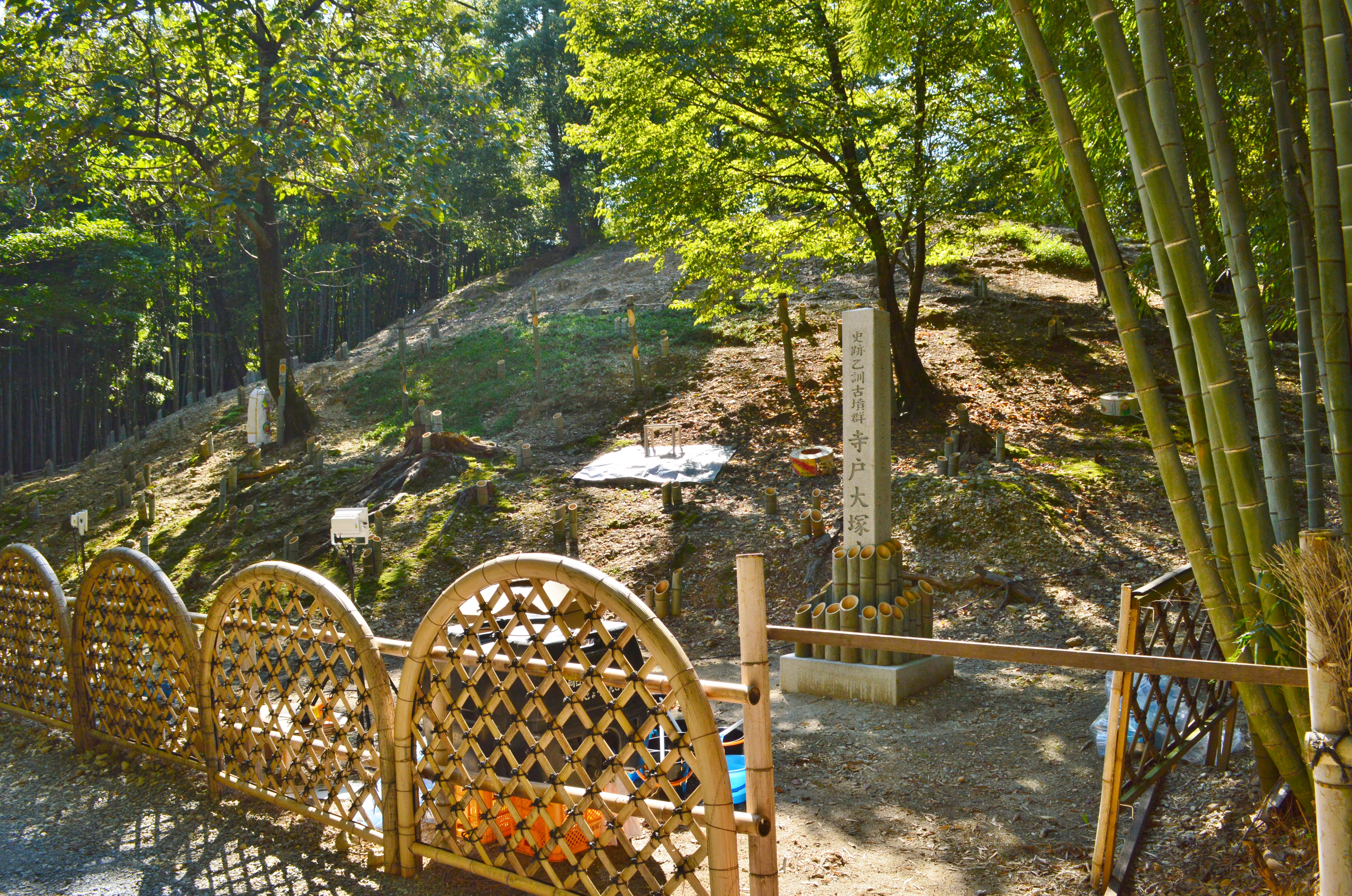
- Terado Ōtsuka Kofun

- Terado Ōtsuka Kofun Terado Ōtsuka Kofun (Japan)
- 34°57′21.0″N 135°41′19.0″E
- Type: Kofun
- Periods: Kofun period
- Location: Mukō, Kyoto, Japan
- Region: Kansai region

History
- Built: c.late 4th century

Site notes
- Public access: Yes
- National Historic Site of Japan 京都府内の位置

Terado Ōtsuka Kofun (寺戸大塚古墳) is a Kofun period keyhole-shaped burial mound, located in the Shibayama, Terado neighborhood of Mukō, Kyoto in the Kansai region of Japan. The tumulus was designated a National Historic Site of Japan in 2015, and was incorporated into the Otokuni Kofun Cluster in 2016.

== Overview ==
The Terado Ōtsuka Kofun is located at an elevation of about 80 meters at the northern end of the southern part of the Mukō Hills. It is a zenpō-kōen-fun (前方後円墳), which is shaped like a keyhole, having one square end and one circular end, when viewed from above and is orientated to the south-southeast. The tumulus is 98 meters long, with a 57-meter diameter posterior circular mound with a diameter of 57 meters and height of 10 meters, and a rectangular anterior portion 45 meter wide. The surface of the tumulus is covered with fukiishi roofing stones, and cylindrical haniwa are lined up. The rear circular mound of the mound is intact, but the front part is severely destroyed. The front part is built in two tiers, and the rear circular part in three tiers.To date, eleven archaeological excavations have been carried out. Investigations were carried out on the anterior part in 1923 and 1942, and on the posterior circular mound in 1942. According to a 1967 excavation, both the anterior and posterior mounds have pit-type stone burial chambers. The burial chamber in the posterior circular mound was made of slabs of stone and had a clay floor and was 6.5 meters long and 85 cm wide. Grave goods such as bronze mirror, stone bracelets, beads, iron swords, axes, sickles, knives and clay containers remained inside the burial chamber, but there were also signs of grave robbery. The mirrors were a triangular-rimmed Buddhist and animal mirror and a triangular-rimmed divine and animal mirror, both made in China. The burial chamber in the anterior mound has an internal length of 5.3 meters and width of one meter, was also made of slabs of stone and a clay floor. Grave goods such as a bronze mirror, beads, stone objects, iron swords, bronze arrowheads, iron arrowheads, axes and sickles were placed inside. The mirrors include a Chinese-made animal belt mirror, as well as an imitation square-grid animal pattern mirror and a triangular-rimmed god and beast mirror. The triangular-rimmed god and beast mirror is identical to one found at the Tsubai Ōtsukayama Kofun and may have been cast using the same mold. From these artifacts, it be believed that the tumulus dates from the late 4th century, or the early Kofun period.

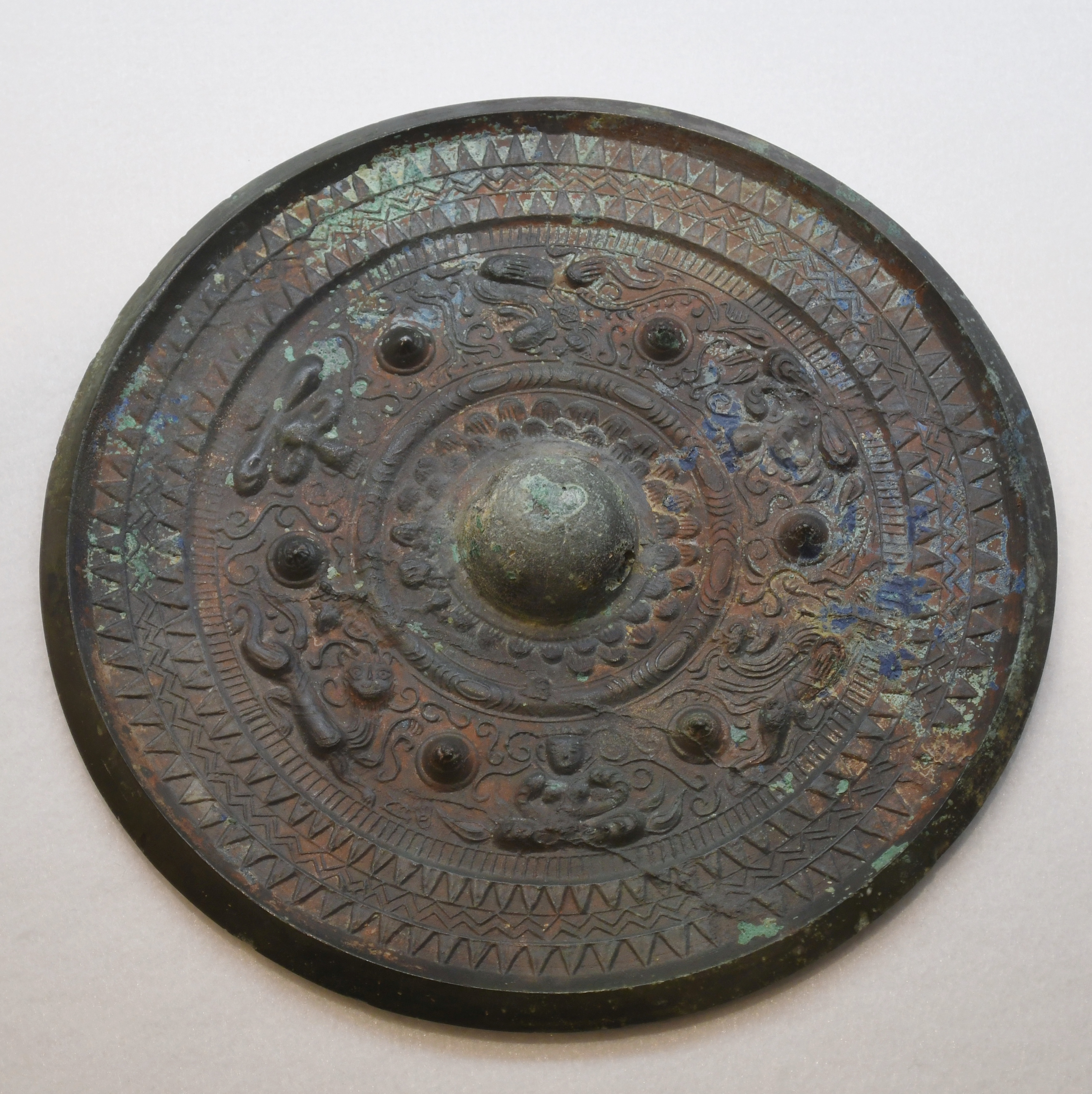
Triangular-rimmed mirror with a band depicting three Buddhas and three animals, unearthed in a pit-style stone coffin at the rear of the mound. Photographed during a special exhibition at the Muko City Cultural Museum.

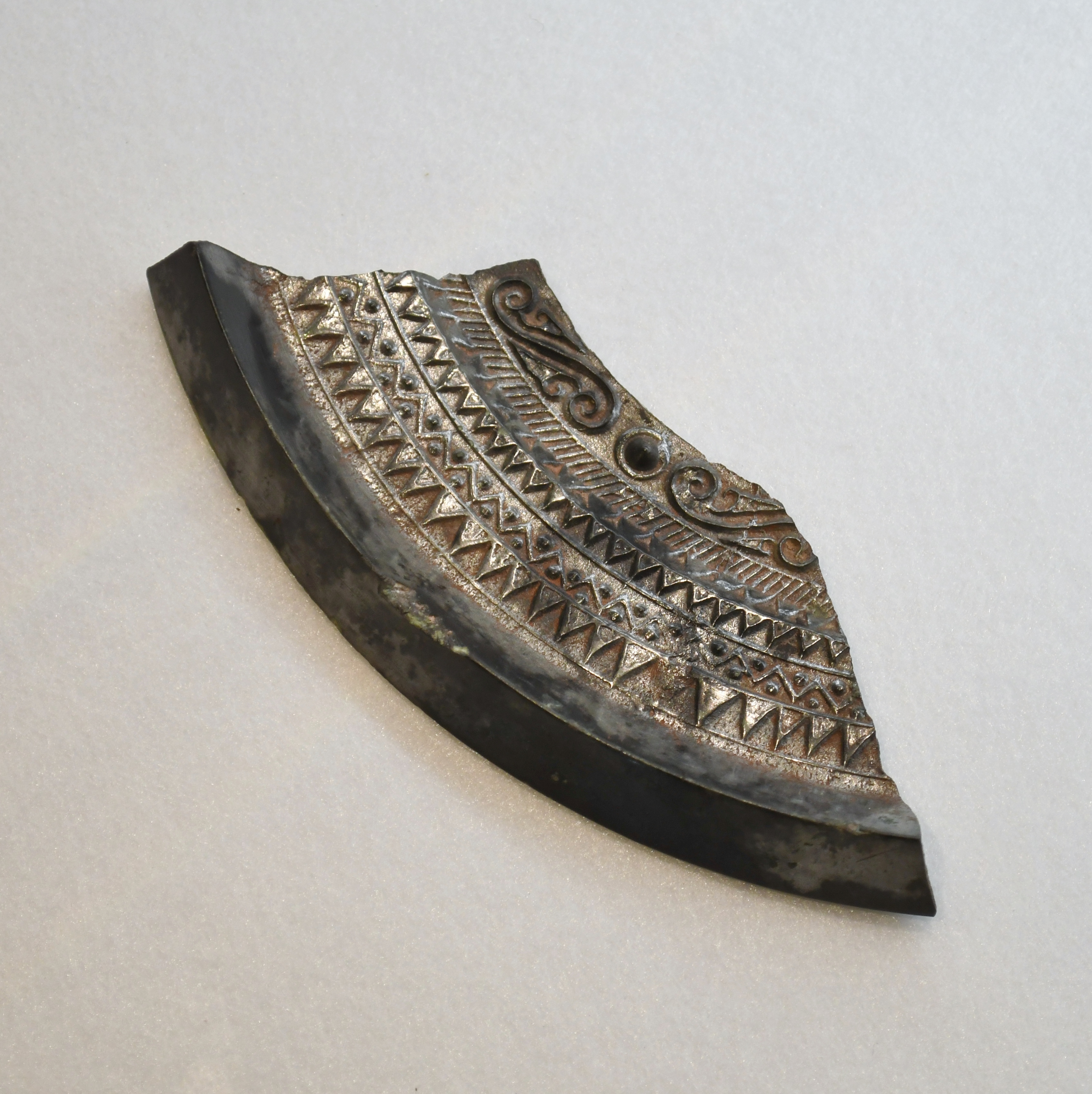
Fragment of a triangular-rimmed mirror with a band depicting four gods and four animals, unearthed in a pit-style stone coffin at the rear of the mound. Photographed during a special exhibition at the Muko City Cultural Museum.

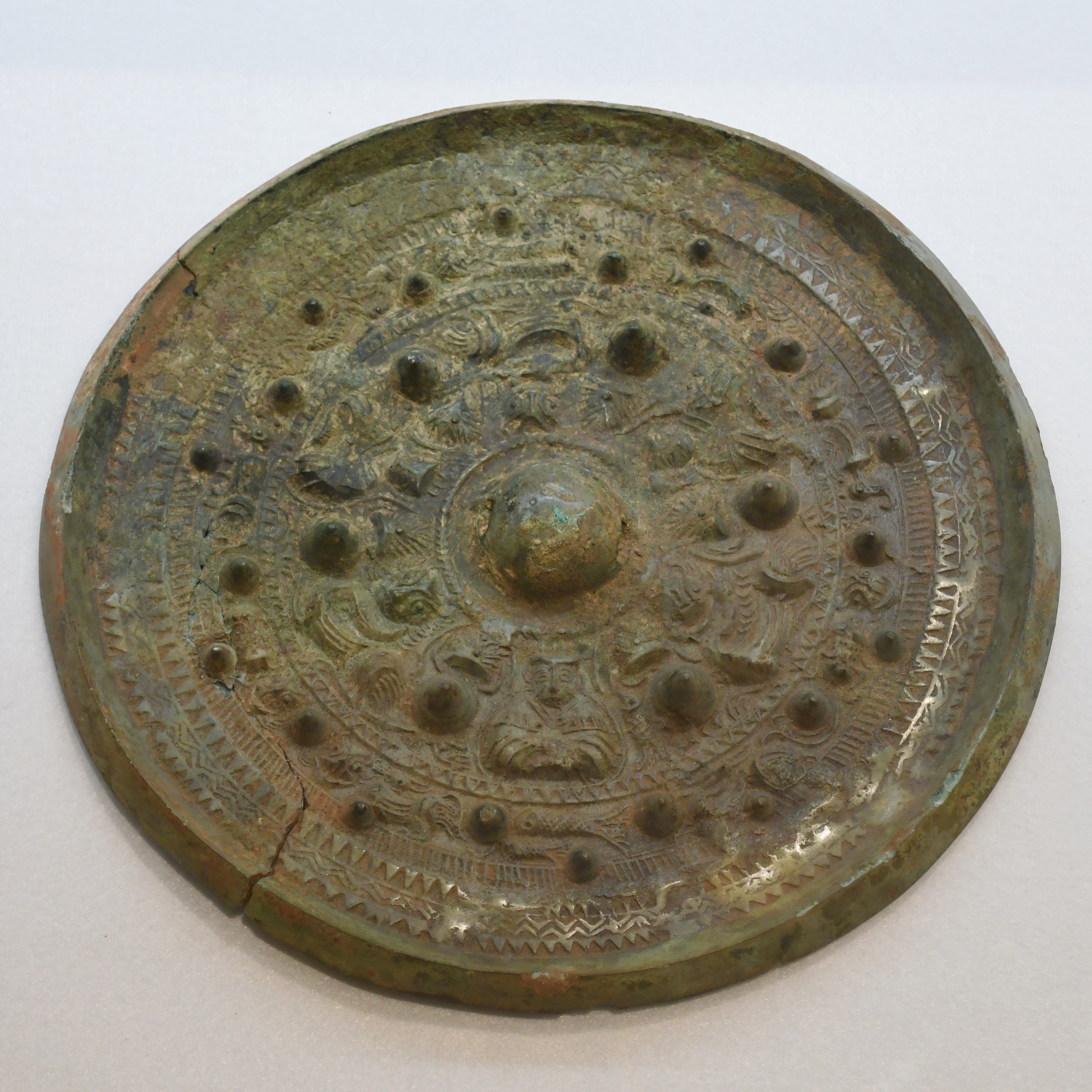
Imitation triangular-rimmed mirror with three gods and three beasts, imitation of a belt mirror
Excavated from a pit-style stone coffin at the front. Photographed during a special exhibition at the Muko City Cultural Museum.

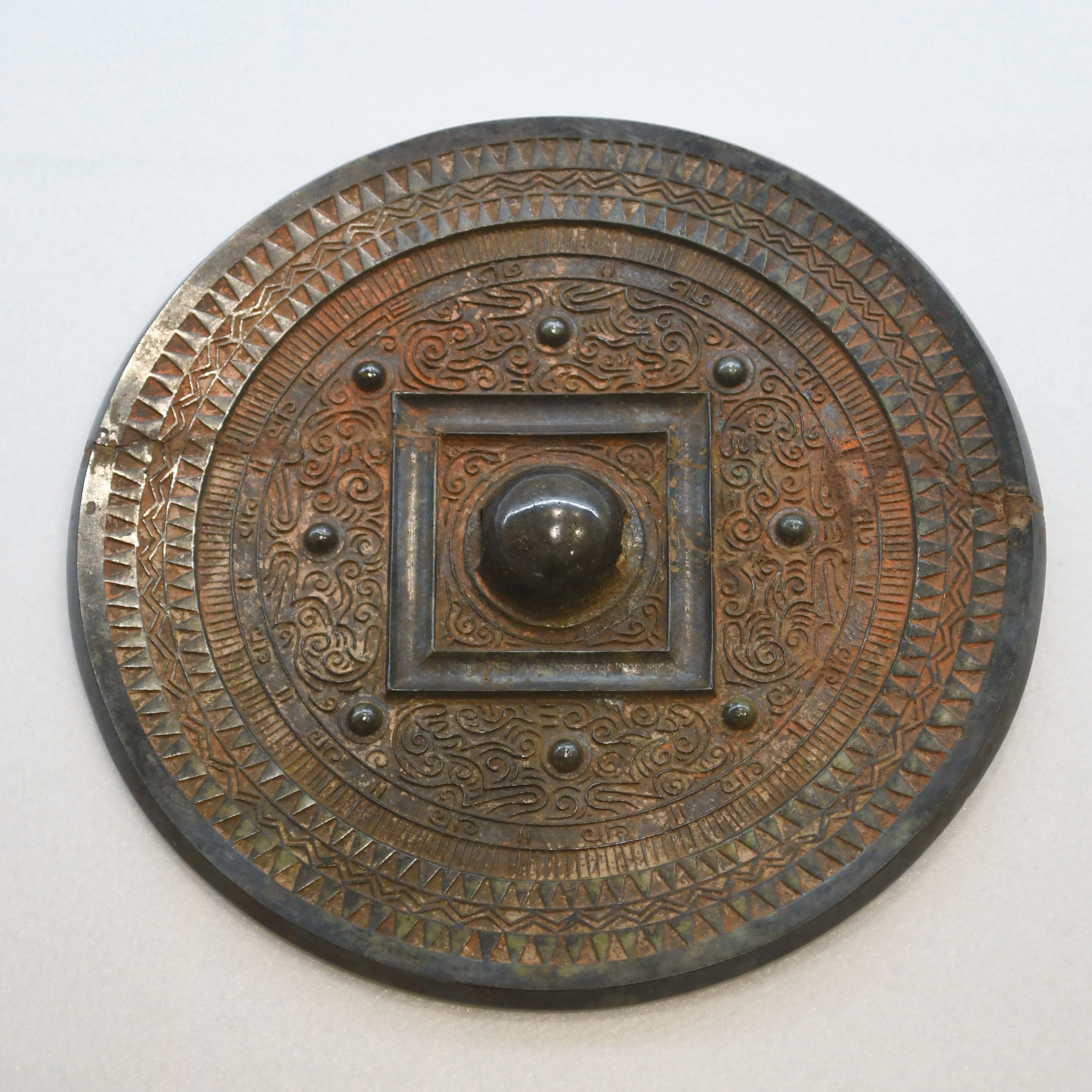
Square-grid four gods mirror
Excavated from a pit-style stone coffin at the front. Photographed during a special exhibition at the Muko City Cultural Museum.

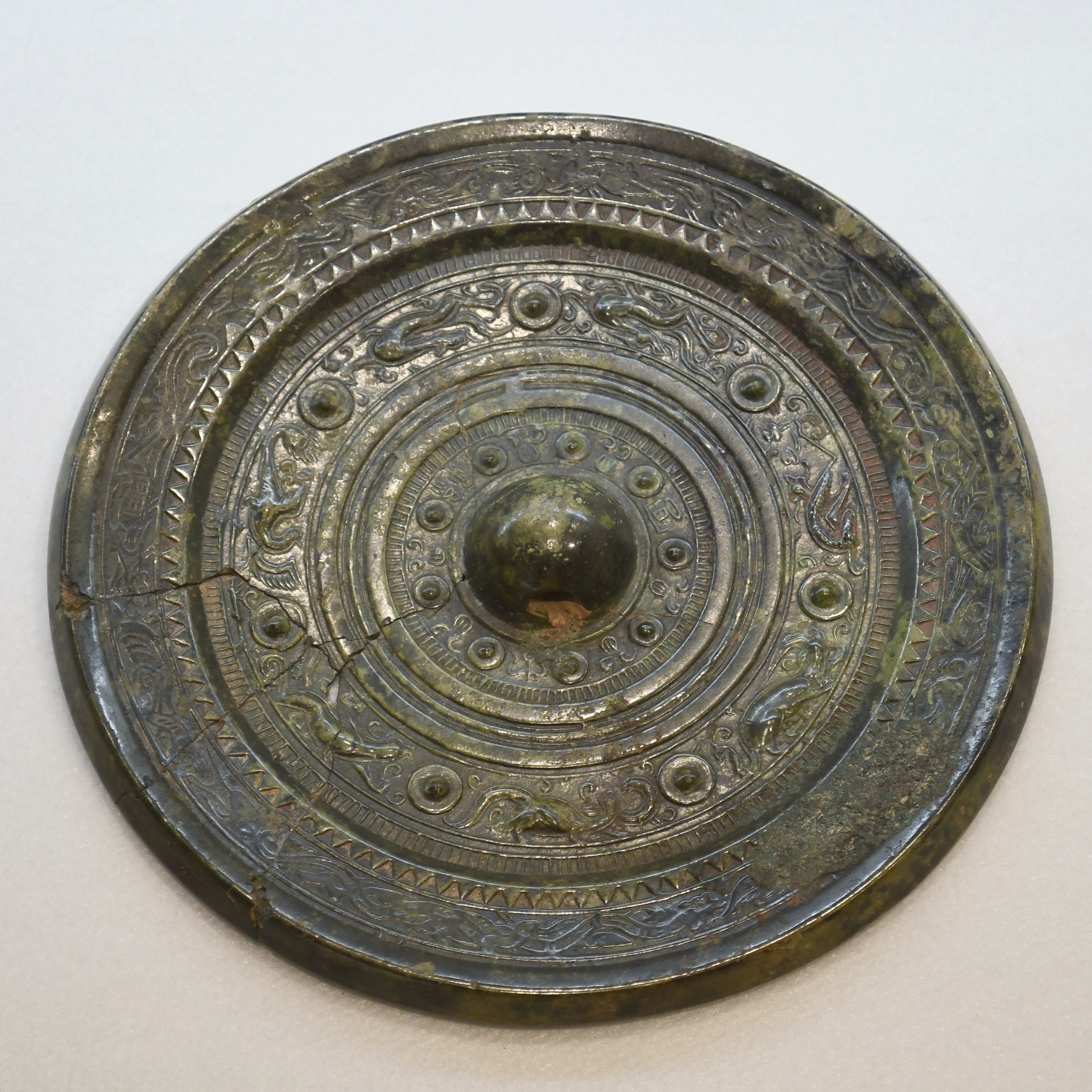
Relief-style beasts belt mirror
Excavated from a pit-style stone coffin at the front. Photographed during a special exhibition at the Muko City Cultural Museum.

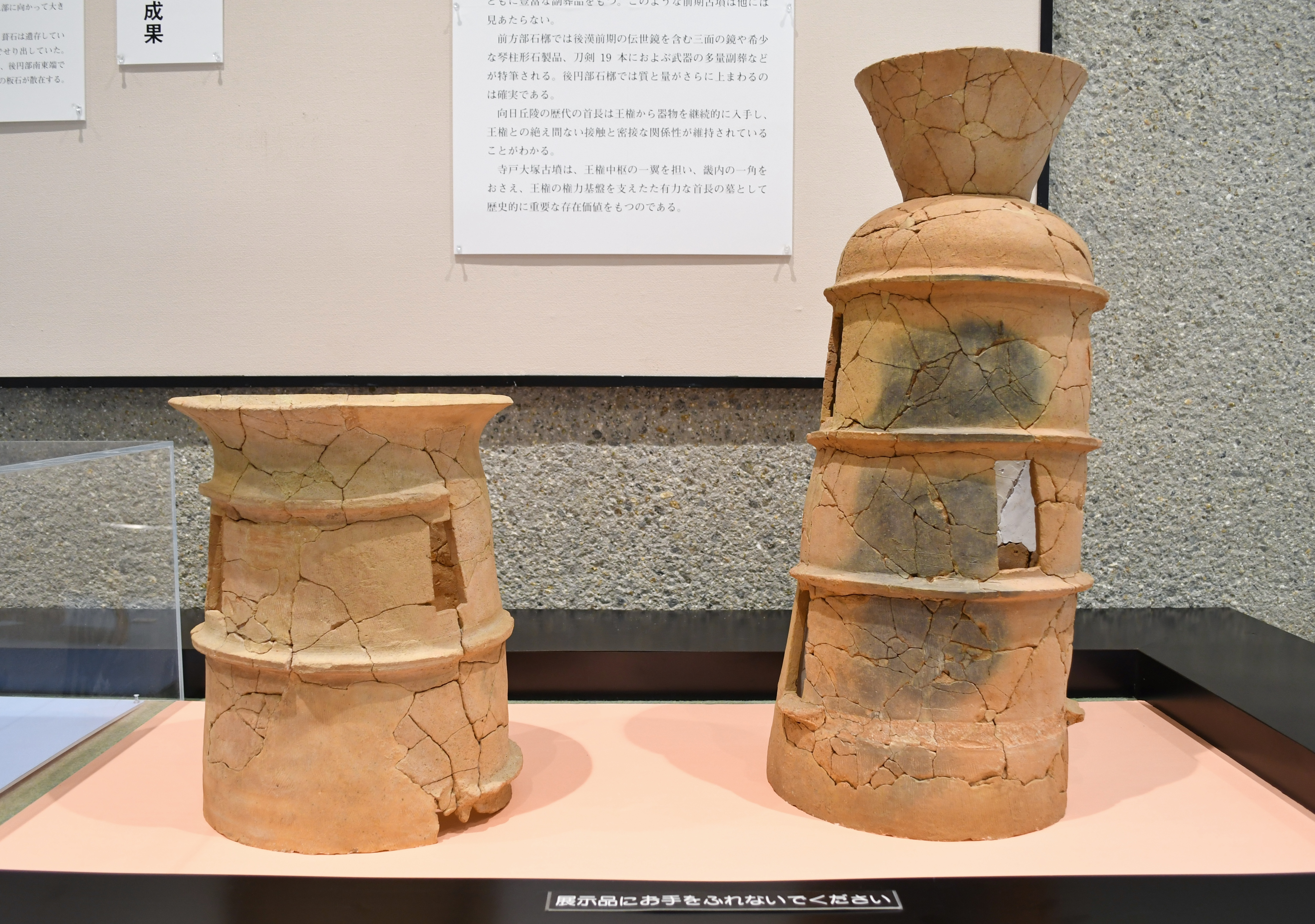
Cylindrical Haniwa and Morning Glory-Shaped Haniwa
Photographed during a special exhibition at Muko City Cultural Museum.

The tumulus is about a 20-minute walk from Higashi-Muko Station on the Hankyu Kyoto Line.

== See also ==
- List of Historic Sites of Japan (Kyoto)
