= Hijirizuka Kofun - Ayamezuka Kofun =

- 聖塚・菖蒲塚古墳 (Japanese)
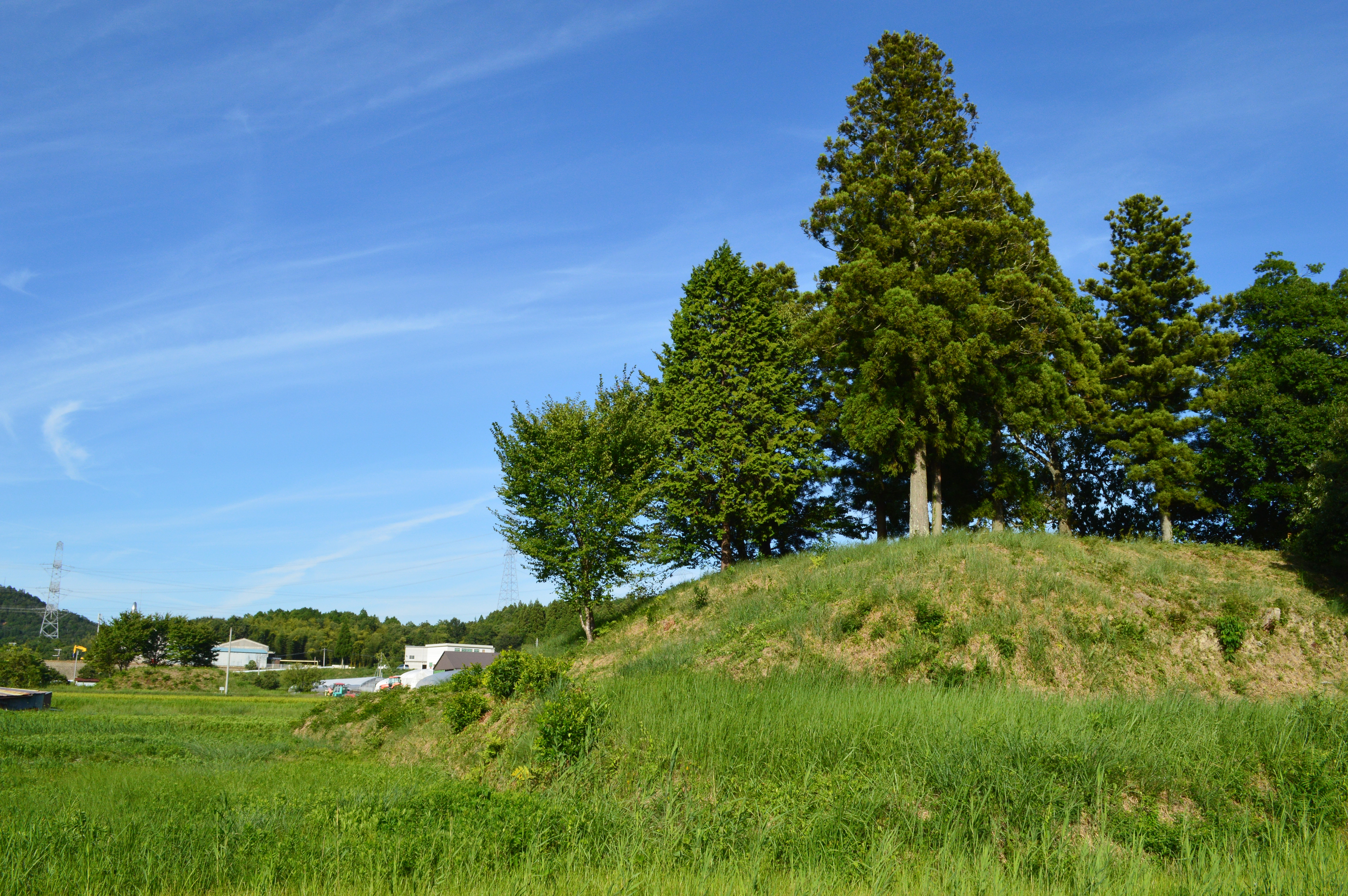
- Hijirizuka Kofun (right) and Ayamezuka Kofun (left rear)

- Hijirizuka Kofun - Ayamezuka Kofun Hijirizuka Kofun - Ayamezuka Kofun (Japan)
- Interactive map of Hijirizuka Kofun - Ayamezuka Kofun
- 35°19′17.82″N 135°16′17.67″E
- Type: Kofun
- Periods: Kofun period
- Location: Ayabe, Kyoto, Japan
- Region: Kansai region

History
- Built: c.mid-5th century

Site notes
- Public access: Yes

The Hijirizuka Kofun - Ayamezuka Kofun (聖塚・菖蒲塚古墳) is a pair of Kofun period burial mounds, located in the Tada neighborhood of the city of Ayabe, Kyoto in the Kansai region of Japan. The tumuli were collectively designated a National Historic Site of Japan in 1992.

== Overview ==
The Hijirizuka Kofun and Ayamezuka Kofun are both rectangular hōfun (方墳)-style tumuli. They are located about 120 meters apart on the Hatta River, a tributary of the Yura River, in the central northern part of Kyoto Prefecture, about 2.5 kilometers from the center of the city of Ayase. Both are estimated to have been built around the first half of the 5th century in the middle of the Kofun period, and are among the largest in the Tanba region. The Hijirizuka Kofun was first excavated in 1894, at which time a large quantity of grave goods were found. These included a bronze mirror, iron swords, a halberd, armor, magatama, and more than 30 glass balls. The mound was found to have been constructed in two-tiers, with fukiishi and both cylindrical and figurative haniwa. The mound measured 54 meters on each side, with a height of seven meters and was surrounded by a moat with a width ranging from 10.3 to 13 meters. Another excavation was made on both tumuli in 1983, during which time was discovered that the Hijirizuka Kofun had a structure on the center of its southern side, which measured 17.5 meters east-west by 4.6 meters north-south. Many haniwa were found around this location, indicating that it had some ceremonial or ritual significance.

The Ayamezuka Kofun measures 32 meters on each side, and has a height of 5.1 meters. It also had fukiishi and haniwa rows, and likewise was found to have a structure in the center of its southern side. However, in the case of the Ayamezuka Kofun, it was trapezoidal, with measurements of 4.5 meters east-west and 3.2 meters north-south.

The site is about a seven-minute walk from Ayabe Station on the JR West Maizuru Line.

== Gallery ==
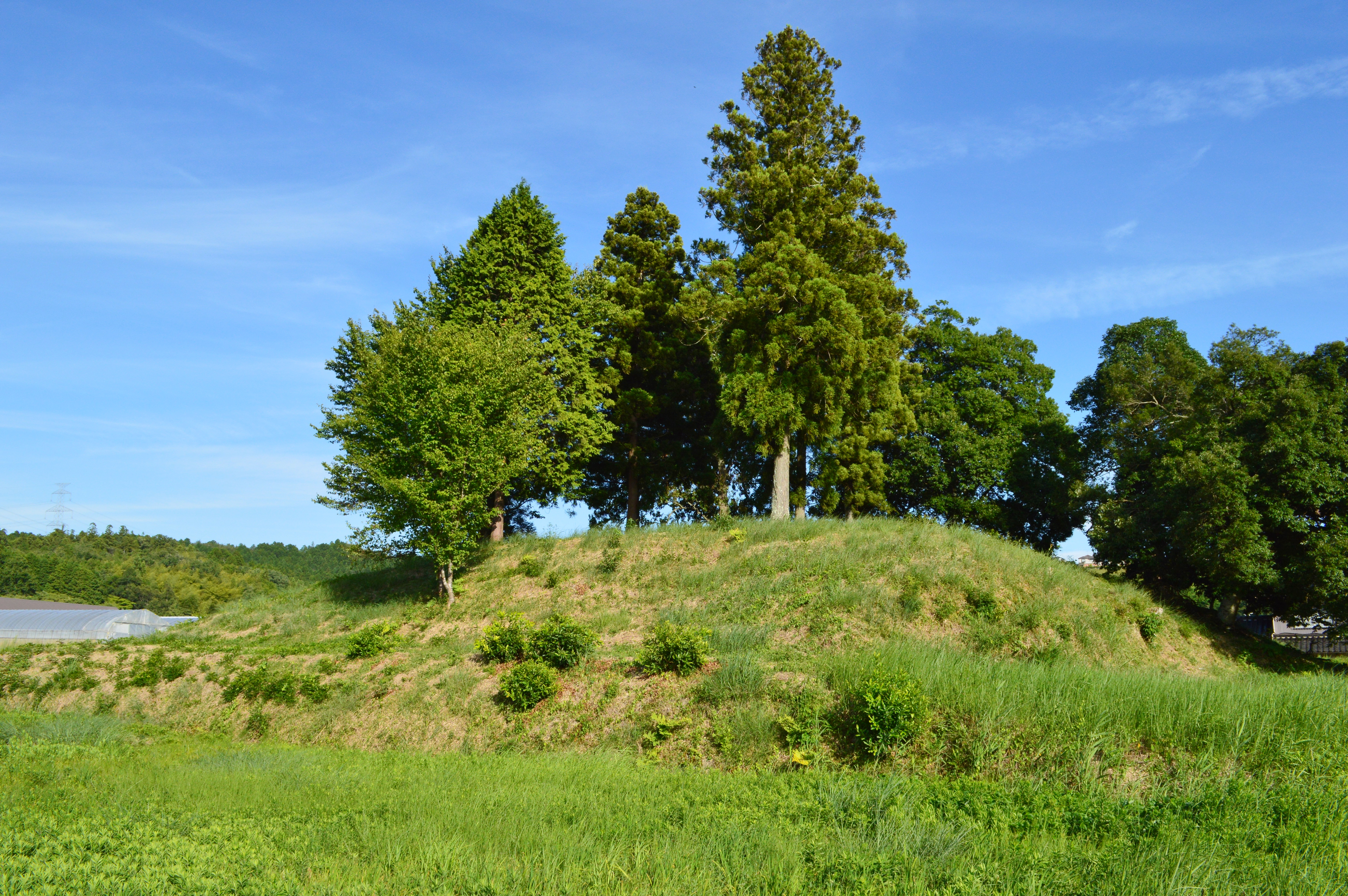
Hijirizuka Kofun

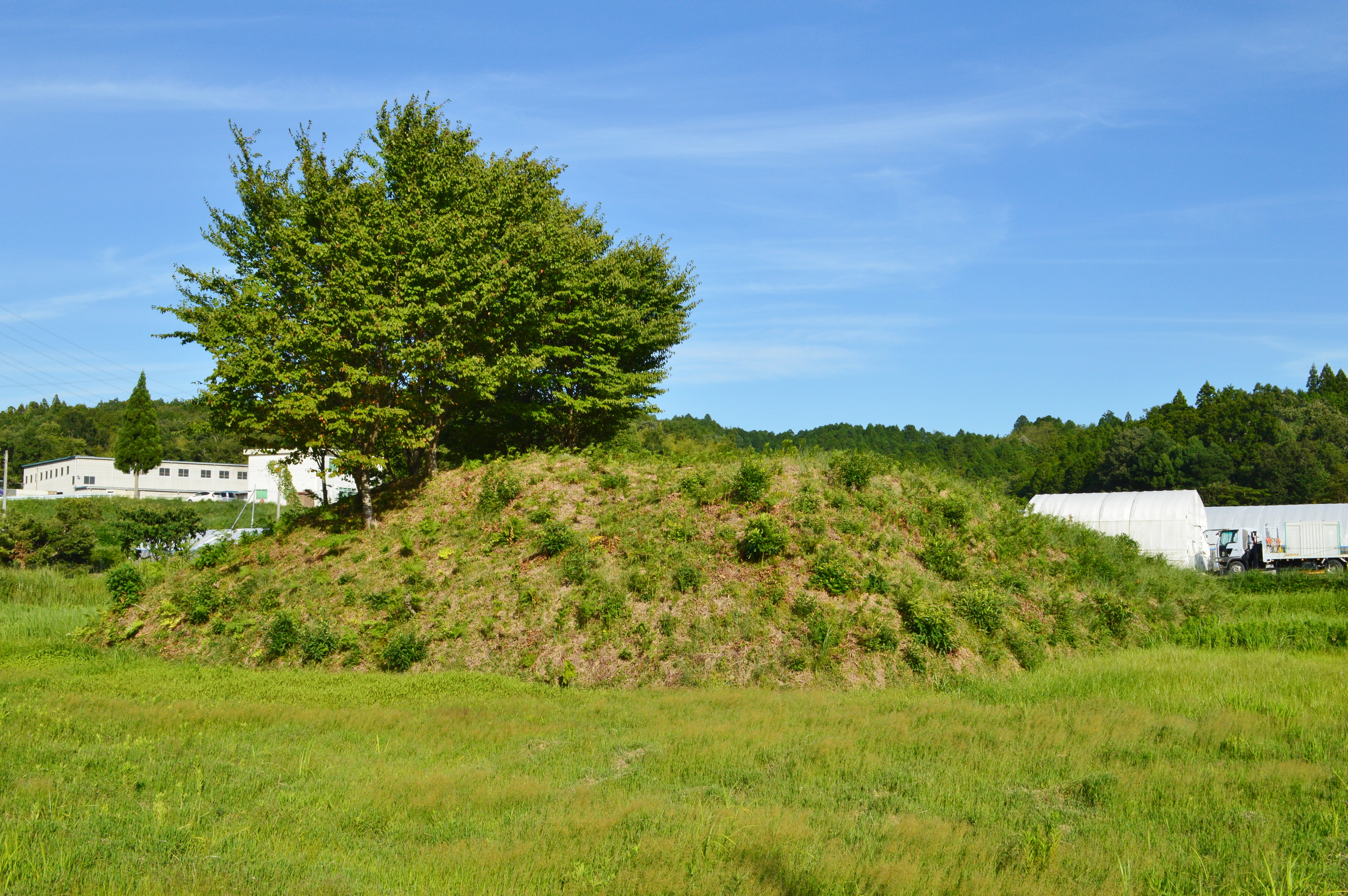
Ayamezuka Kofun

== See also ==
- List of Historic Sites of Japan (Kyoto)
