= Ishinokarato Kofun =

Kofun period burial mound in Japan

- 石のカラト古墳 (Japanese)
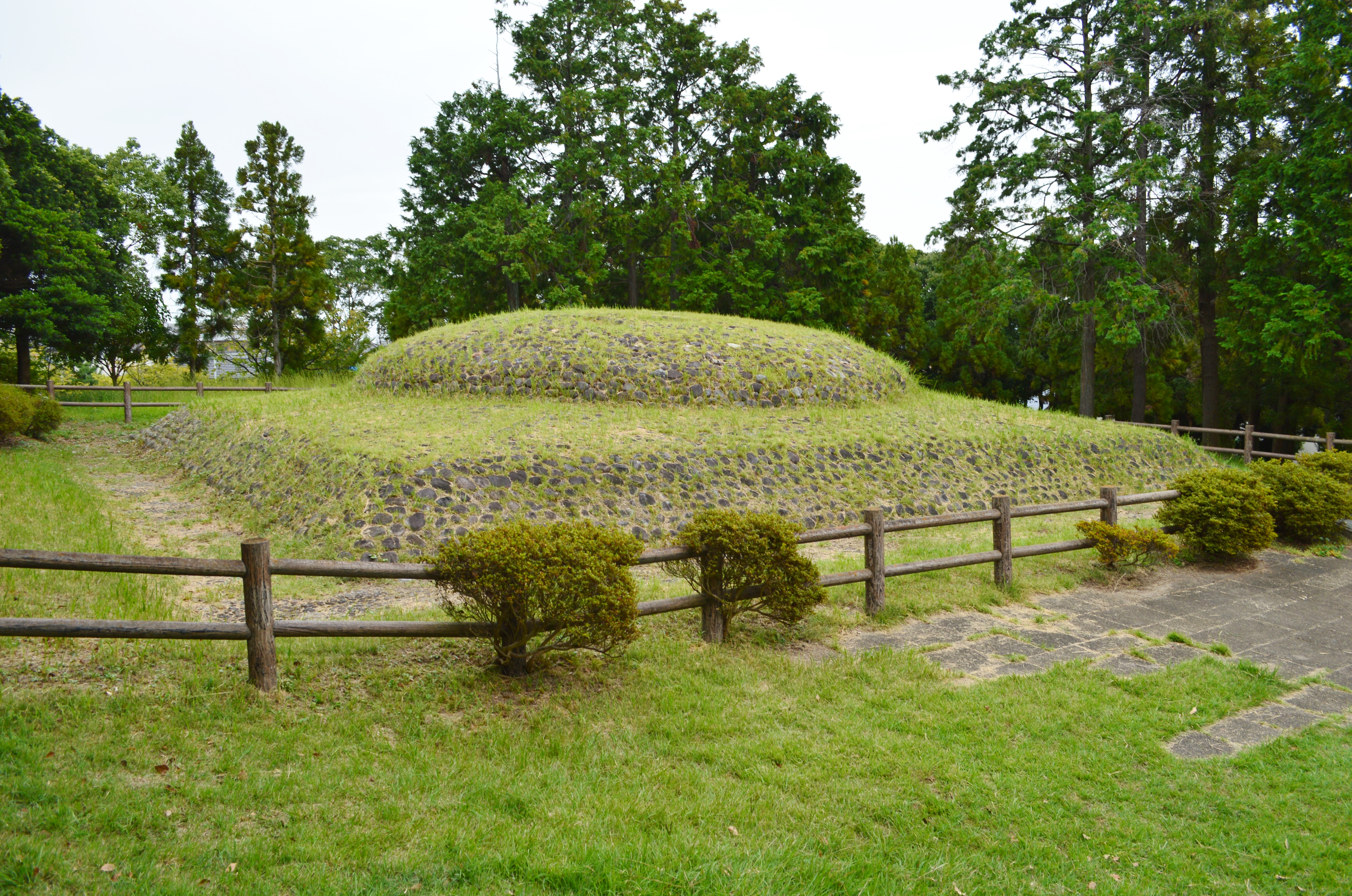
- Ishinokarato Kofun

- Ishinokarato Kofun Ishinokarato Kofun (Japan)
- Interactive map of Ishinokarato Kofun
- 34°43′25.72″N 135°46′42.77″E
- Type: Kofun
- Periods: Asuka period
- Location: Nara, Nara, and Kizugawa, Kyoto, Japan
- Region: Kansai region

History
- Built: c.8th century

Site notes
- Public access: Yes (no facilities)

Ishinokarato Kofun (石のカラト古墳) is a burial mound, located on the border of the Kabutodai neighborhood of the city of Kizugawa, Kyoto and the Jingū neighborhood of the city of Nara in the Kansai region of Japan. The tumulus was designated a National Historic Site of Japan in 1996. On the Kyoto Prefecture side, it is referred to as the Kazahahi Kofun (カザハヒ古墳).

== Overview ==
Ishinokarato Kofun is located on a terraced flat area on the eastern slope of the Heijōyama Hills in the northern outskirts of Heijō-kyō, the capital of Japan in the Nara period. It has a very unusual design known as a Joenkahofun (上円下方墳) in that the tumulus its lower stage is square hōfun (ほうふん)-style base upon which a circular enpun (円墳)-style mound is built. The tumulus thus resembles a Chinese-style chest, or "Karato". The tumulus is built of tramped earth, with the lower tier measuring 13.8 meters on each side, and two meters in height. The upper tier is 9.2 meters in diameter and 1.6 meters high. Fukiishi, consisting of river stones, protect the surface and drainage facilities such as culverts and drainage ditches are provided around the mound, but most of the fukiishi on the upper stage have been lost. The burial facility is a horizontal-entry stone burial chamber opening to the south. The stone coffin is similar to that of the Takamatsuzuka Kofun and is 1.4 by 2.6 meters, with a height of 1.06 meters. The tomb was robbed in pre-modern times so no grave goods remained, but per an archaeological excavation in 1979, lacquer fragments (possibly a lacquered coffin), as well as one gold ball, one silver ball, three silver-adorned sword fittings, pieces of gold leaf, and were found inside the stone coffin, and Sue ware pottery was also found in the passageway.

The Ishinokarato Kofun is estimated to have been built in the early 8th century, in the Asuka Period, after the end of the Kofun period. Although the identity of the person buried here is unknown, it is believed to be the tomb of an aristocrat from around the early Nara period. It has now been restored to its original appearance and maintained as a park. It is about a 20-minute walk from Takanohara Station on the Kintetsu Kyoto Line.

== See also ==
- List of Historic Sites of Japan (Kyoto)
- List of Historic Sites of Japan (Nara)
