= List of historic sites of Japan (Kyoto) =

This list is of the historic sites of Japan located within the Urban Prefecture of Kyōto.

== National Historic Sites ==
As of 3 January 2026, ninety-seven Sites have been designated as being of national significance (including four *Special Historic Sites); Ishinokarato Kofun and Narayama Tile Kiln Sites span the prefectural borders with Nara and Lake Biwa Canal those with Shiga.

Site	Municipality	Comments	Image	Coordinates	Type	Ref.
*Jishō-ji (Ginkaku-ji) Gardens 慈照寺（銀閣寺）庭園 Jishōji (Ginkakuji) teien	Sakyō-ku, Kyoto	also a Special Place of Scenic Beauty; component of the World Heritage Site Historic Monuments of Ancient Kyoto (Kyoto, Uji and Otsu Cities)	Jishōji (Ginkakuji) Gardens	35°01′36″N 135°47′54″E	8	1658
*Rokuon-ji (Kinkaku-ji) Gardens 鹿苑寺（金閣寺）庭園 Rokuonji (Kinkakuji) teien	Kita-ku, Kyoto	also a Special Place of Scenic Beauty; component of the World Heritage Site Historic Monuments of Ancient Kyoto (Kyoto, Uji and Otsu Cities)	Rokuonji (Kinkakuji) Gardens	35°02′23″N 135°43′43″E	8	1657
*Daigo-ji Sanbō-in Gardens 醍醐寺三宝院庭園 Daigoji Sanbō-in teien	Fushimi-ku, Kyoto	also a Special Place of Scenic Beauty; component of the World Heritage Site Historic Monuments of Ancient Kyoto (Kyoto, Uji and Otsu Cities)	Daigoji Sanbō-in Gardens	34°57′07″N 135°49′10″E	8	1660
*Kuni-kyō Palace (Yamashiro Kokunbun-ji) ruins 恭仁宮跡（山城国分寺跡） Kunikyū seki (Yamashiro Kokubunji ato)	Kizugawa	provincial temple of Yamashiro Province	Kuni-kyō Palace Site (Yamashiro Kokunbunji Site)	34°45′57″N 135°51′44″E	2, 3	1712
Itō Jinsai Residence Site and Archive 伊藤仁斎宅（古義堂）跡ならびに書庫 Itō Jinsai taku (Kogidō) ato narabini shoko	Kamigyō-ku, Kyoto			35°01′14″N 135°45′09″E	4, 8	1639
Uji River Taikō Embankment 宇治川太閤堤跡 Uji-gawa taikō zutsumi ato	Uji	Embankment built by Toyotomi Hideyoshi in the late Sengoku period	Uji River Taikō Embankment	34°53′46″N 135°48′18″E	6	00003644
Otokuni Kofun Cluster 乙訓古墳群 Otokuni kofun-gun	Kyōto, Mukō, Nagaokakyō, Ōyamazaki	Kofun period burial mounds; designation comprises eleven mounds: Tennō-no-Mori Kofun (天皇の杜古墳), Terado Ōtsuka Kofun (寺戸大塚古墳), Itsukahara Kofun (五塚原古墳), Moto-Inari Kofun (元稲荷古墳), Nanjō Kofun (南条古墳), Mozume Kurumazuka Kofun (物集女車塚古墳), Igenoyama Kofun (恵解山古墳), Inouchi Kurumazuka Kofun (井ノ内車塚古墳), Inouchi Inarizuka Kofun (井ノ内稲荷塚古墳), Imazato Ōtsuka Kofun (今里大塚古墳), and Torii-mae Kofun (鳥居前古墳)	Otokuni Kofun Cluster	34°58′39″N 135°41′23″E	1	1638
Kada no Azumamaro Former Residence 荷田春満旧宅 Kada no Azumamaro kyū-taku	Fushimi-ku, Kyoto	Edo period scholar's residence	Kada no Azumamaro Former Residence	34°58′01″N 135°46′22″E	1	1641
Kamomioya Jinja (Shimogamo Jinja) Precinct 賀茂御祖神社境内 Kamo-mioya Jinja keidai	Sakyō-ku, Kyoto	Shinto shrine; component of the World Heritage Site Historic Monuments of Ancient Kyoto (Kyoto, Uji and Otsu Cities)	Kamomioya Jinja Precinct	35°02′18″N 135°46′22″E	3	1746
Kamowakeikazuchi Jinja (Kamigamo Jinja) Precinct 賀茂別雷神社境内 Kamo-wakeikazuchi Jinja keidai	Kita-ku, Kyoto	Shinto shrine; component of the World Heritage Site Historic Monuments of Ancient Kyoto (Kyoto, Uji and Otsu Cities)	Kamowakeikazuchi Jinja Precinct	35°04′37″N 135°45′02″E	3	1753
Mount Kasagi 笠置山 Kasagi-yama	Kasagi	also a Place of Scenic Beauty; in Kasagiyama Prefectural Natural Park	Mount Kasagi	34°45′24″N 135°56′38″E	2, 3, 7	1680
Katagihara temple ruins 樫原廃寺跡 Katagihara Haiji ato	Nishikyō-ku, Kyoto	Asuka period temple ruins	Katagihara Haiji Site	34°58′14″N 135°41′26″E	3	1729
Iwakura Tomomi Former Residence 岩倉具視幽棲旧宅 Iwakura Tomomi Yūsei kyū-taku	Sakyō-ku, Kyoto		Iwakura Tomomi Former Residence	35°04′42″N 135°46′59″E	8	1679
Kuse temple ruins 久世廃寺跡 Kuse haiji ato	Jōyō	Nara period temple ruins	Kuse temple ruins	34°51′35″N 135°46′48″E	3	00003595
Kutsukawa Kofun Cluster 久津川古墳群 Kutsukawa kofun-gun	Jōyō	Kofun period burial mound cluster; designation comprises four mounds: Kutsukawa Kurumazuka Kofun (久津川車塚), Maruzuka Kofun (丸塚古墳), Bashōzuka Kofun (芭蕉塚古墳), and Kuse Shōgakkō Kofun (久世小学校古墳)	Kutsukawa Kofun Cluster	34°51′53″N 135°46′44″E	1	1741
Nijō-jō 旧二条離宮（二条城） kyū-Nijō rikyū (Nijō-jō)	Nakagyō-ku, Kyoto	Edo period castle, component of the World Heritage Site Historic Monuments of Ancient Kyoto (Kyoto, Uji and Otsu Cities)	Nijō-jō	35°00′49″N 135°44′49″E	2, 8	1695
Kyōōgokokuji (Tō-ji) Precinct 教王護国寺境内 Kyōōgokokuji keidai	Minami-ku, Kyoto	Heian period Buddhist temple; component of the World Heritage Site Historic Monuments of Ancient Kyoto (Kyoto, Uji and Otsu Cities)	Kyōōgokokuji Precinct	34°58′52″N 135°44′52″E	2, 3	1685
Gyokuhō-in Gardens 玉鳳院庭園 Gyokuhō-in teien	Ukyō-ku, Kyoto	also a Place of Scenic Beauty; subtemple of Myōshin-ji		35°01′21″N 135°43′18″E	8	1673
Kontai-ji Precinct 金胎寺境内 Kontaiji keidai	Wazuka	Asuka period Buddhist temple	Kontaiji Precinct	34°49′48″N 135°54′34″E	2	1686
Kurusuno Tile Kiln ruins 栗栖野瓦窯跡 Kurusuno kawara gama ato	Sakyō-ku, Kyoto	Heian period roof tile kiln ruins	Kurusuno Tile Kiln ruins	35°03′52″N 135°46′23″E	6	1683
Keishun-in Gardens 桂春院庭園 Keishun-in teien	Ukyō-ku, Kyoto	also a Place of Scenic Beauty; subtemple of Myōshin-ji	Keishun-in Gardens	35°01′29″N 135°43′21″E	8	1677
Kohōan Gardens 孤篷庵庭園 Kohōan teien	Kita-ku	also a Place of Scenic Beauty; subtemple of Daitoku-ji	Kohōan Gardens	35°02′35″N 135°44′23″E	8	1653
Odoi 御土居 Odoi	Kita-ku, Nakagyō-ku, Kamigyō-ku, Kyoto	Sengoku period moat around Kyoto	Odoi	35°02′46″N 135°44′10″E	2	1667
Kōzan-ji Precinct 高山寺境内 Kōsanji keidai	Ukyō-ku, Kyoto	Buddhist temple; component of the World Heritage Site Historic Monuments of Ancient Kyoto (Kyoto, Uji and Otsu Cities)	Kōzanji Precinct	35°03′36″N 135°40′42″E	3	1722
Takasegawa Ichi-no-funairi 高瀬川一之船入 Takase-gawa ichi-no-funairi	Nakagyō-ku	Edo period canal port	Takase River First Port	35°00′44″N 135°46′11″E	6	1684
Kōdai-ji Gardens 高台寺庭園 Kōdaiji teien	Higashiyama-ku, Kyoto	also a Place of Scenic Beauty	Kōdaiji Gardens	35°00′03″N 135°46′55″E	8	1661
Koma-dera ruins 高麗寺跡 Komadera ato	Kizugawa	Asuka period temple ruins	Komadera Site	34°44′58″N 135°49′40″E	3	1697
Tsukuriyama Kofun 作山古墳 Tsukuriyama kofun	Yosano	Kofun period tumulus	Tsukuriyama Kofun	35°30′21″N 135°06′18″E	1	1669
Yamashina Hongan-ji and Nanden Site 山科本願寺跡及び南殿跡 Yamashina Honganji oyobi Nanden ato	Yamashina-ku, Kyoto		Yamashina Honganji and Nanden Site	34°59′04″N 135°49′20″E	3	3426
Ubusunayama Kofun 産土山古墳 Ubusunayama kofun	Kyōtango	Kofun period tumulus	Ubusunayama Kofun	35°44′29″N 135°06′43″E	1	1713
Kisaichi Maruyama Kofun 私市円山古墳 Kisaichi Maruyama kofun	Ayabe	Kofun period tumulus	Kisaichi Maruyama Kofun	35°18′54″N 135°11′47″E	1	1755
Shisen-dō 詩仙堂 Shisendō	Sakyō-ku, Kyoto		Shisendō	35°02′37″N 135°47′46″E	8	1665
Jishō-ji (Ginkaku-ji) Old Precinct 慈照寺（銀閣寺）旧境内 Jishōji (Ginkakuji) kyū-keidai	Sakyō-ku, Kyoto	Buddhist temple; component of the World Heritage Site Historic Monuments of Ancient Kyoto (Kyoto, Uji and Otsu Cities)	Jishōji (Ginkakuji) Old Precinct	35°01′36″N 135°47′53″E	3, 8	1671
Shibagahara Kofun 芝ヶ原古墳 Shibagahara kofun	Jōyō	Kofun period tumulus	Shibagahara Kofun	34°51′46″N 135°47′01″E	1	1750
Hebizuka Kofun 蛇塚古墳 Hebizuka kofun	Ukyō-ku, Kyoto	Kofun period tumulus	Hebizuka Kofun	35°00′43″N 135°42′01″E	1	1736
Shōka-dō and Site 松花堂およびその跡 Shōkadō oyobi sono ato	Yawata		Shōkadō and Site	34°52′47″N 135°42′05″E	8	1714
Jōruri-ji Gardens 浄瑠璃寺庭園 Jōruriji teien	Kizugawa	also a Special Place of Scenic Beauty	Jōruriji Gardens	34°42′56″N 135°52′24″E	8	1721
Moriyama Site 森山遺跡 Moriyama iseki	Jōyō	Jomon period settlement traces	Moriyama Site	34°50′36″N 135°47′27″E	1	1738
Shinjuan Gardens 真珠庵庭園 Shinjuan teien	Kita-ku, Kyoto		Shinjuan Gardens	35°02′39″N 135°44′48″E	8	1651
Shinsen-en 神泉苑 Shinsen-en	Nakagyō-ku, Kyoto	Heian period garden and Buddhist temple	Shinsen-en	35°00′42″N 135°44′53″E	3, 8	1689
Shinmeiyama Kofun 神明山古墳 Shinmeiyama kofun	Kyōtango	Kofun period tumulus	Shinmeiyama Kofun	35°44′07″N 135°06′40″E	1	1646
Kamio-dera ruins 神雄寺跡 Kamiodera ato	Kizugawa		Kamiodera Site	34°43′33″N 135°49′30″E	3	00003897
Ninna-ji Gosho Site 仁和寺御所跡 Ninnaji gosho ato	Ukyō-ku, Kyoto	component of the World Heritage Site Historic Monuments of Ancient Kyoto (Kyoto, Uji and Otsu Cities)		35°01′50″N 135°42′50″E	2	1691
Zuishin-in Precinct 随心院境内 Zuishin-in keidai	Yamashina-ku, Kyoto		Zuishin-in Precinct	34°57′33″N 135°48′58″E	3	1723
Shōdō Kanga ruins 正道官衙遺跡 Shōdō kanga iseki	Jōyō		Shōdō Government Office Site	34°51′37″N 135°47′04″E	2	1732
Shōgo-in Former Temporary Imperial Palace 聖護院旧仮皇居 Shōgoin kyū-kari kōkyo	Sakyō-ku, Kyoto		Shōgo-in Former Temporary Imperial Palace	35°01′08″N 135°46′50″E	2	1688
Hijirizuka Kofun - Ayamezuka Kofun 聖塚・菖蒲塚古墳 Hijirizuka・Ayamezuka kofun	Ayabe	Kofun period tumulus	Hijirizuka Kofun - Ayamezuka Kofun	35°19′22″N 135°16′21″E	1	1752
Sai-ji ruins 西寺跡 Saiji ato	Minami-ku, Kyoto	Heian period temple ruins	Saiji Site	34°58′50″N 135°44′17″E	3	1636
Saihō-ji Gardens 西芳寺庭園 Saihōji teien	Nishikyō-ku, Kyoto	Buddhist temple; also a Special Place of Scenic Beauty; component of the World Heritage Site Historic Monuments of Ancient Kyoto (Kyoto, Uji and Otsu Cities)	Saihōji Gardens	34°59′33″N 135°41′04″E	8	1648
Shōren-in Temporary Imperial Palace 青蓮院旧仮御所 Shōren-in kyū-kari gosho	Higashiyama-ku, Kyoto		Shōren-in Temporary Imperial Palace	35°00′26″N 135°47′01″E	2	1699
Iwashimizu Hachimangū Precinct 石清水八幡宮境内 Iwashimizu Hachimangū keidai	Yawata		Iwashimizu Hachimangū Precinct	34°52′47″N 135°42′00″E	3	00003749
Ishikawa Jōzan Grave 石川丈山墓 Ishikawa Jōzan haka	Sakyō-ku, Kyoto			35°02′24″N 135°47′50″E	7	1663
Akasakaimai Tumuli 赤坂今井墳墓 Akasakaimai funbo	Kyōtango	Kofun period tumulus	Akasakaimai Tumuli	35°38′37″N 135°03′02″E	1	00003541
Chitose Kurumazuka Kofun 千歳車塚古墳 Chitose Kurumazuka kofun	Kameoka	Kofun period tumulus	Chitose Kurumazuka Kofun	35°03′25″N 135°34′15″E	1	1745
Mount Funaoka 船岡山 Funaoka-yama	Kita-ku, Kyoto		Mount Funaoka	35°02′21″N 135°44′33″E	2	1725
Taizō-in Gardens 退蔵院庭園 Taizō-in teien	Higashiyama-ku, Kyoto	also a Place of Scenic Beauty; subtemple of Myōshin-ji	Taizō-in Gardens	35°01′19″N 135°43′09″E	8	1676
Daikaku-ji Imperial Palace Site 大覚寺御所跡 Daikakuji gosho ato	Ukyō-ku, Kyoto		Daikakuji Imperial Palace Site	35°00′26″N 135°47′01″E	2	1692
Ōyamazaki Tile Kiln Site 大山崎瓦窯跡 Ōyamazaki kawara gama ato	Ōyamazaki	Heian period tile kiln ruins	Ōyamazaki Tile Kiln Site	34°53′47″N 135°41′00″E	6	00003471
Ōsumi Kurumazuka Kofun 大住車塚古墳 Ōsumi Kurumazuka kofun	Kyōtanabe	Kofun period tumulus	Ōsumi Kurumazuka Kofun	34°50′18″N 135°44′53″E	1	1731
Daisen-in Shoin Gardens 大仙院書院庭園 Daisen-in shoin teien	Kita-ku, Kyoto	also a Special Place of Scenic Beauty; subtemple of Daitoku-ji	Daisen-in Shoin Gardens	35°02′41″N 135°44′44″E	8	1652
Daitoku-ji Precinct 大徳寺境内 Daitokuji keidai	Kita-ku, Kyoto		Daitokuji Precinct	35°00′42″N 135°46′05″E	3, 8	00003960
Daitoku-ji Hōjō Gardens 大徳寺方丈庭園 Daitokuji hōjō teien	Kita-ku, Kyoto	also a Special Place of Scenic Beauty		35°02′38″N 135°44′46″E	8	1650
Daigo-ji Precinct 醍醐寺境内 Daigoji keidai	Fushimi-ku, Kyoto	component of the World Heritage Site Historic Monuments of Ancient Kyoto (Kyoto, Uji and Otsu Cities)	Daigoji Precinct	34°57′05″N 135°49′16″E	3	1724
Tango Kokubun-ji ruins 丹後国分寺跡 Tango Kokubunji ato	Miyazu	provincial temple of Tango Province	Tango Kokubunji ruins	35°34′46″N 135°10′47″E	3	1670
Tanba Kokubun-ji ruins 丹波国分寺跡 附 八幡神社跡 Tanba Kokubunji ato tsuketari Hachiman Jinja ato	Kameoka	provincial temple of Tanba Province	Tanba Kokubunji ruins	35°02′31″N 135°34′43″E	3	1664
Chōshiyama Kofun 銚子山古墳 第一、二古墳 Chōshiyama kofun dai ichi, ni kofun	Kyōtango	Kofun period tumulus	Chōshiyama Kofun	35°40′40″N 135°01′48″E	1	1637
Nagaoka-kyō Palace Site 長岡宮跡 Nagaoka-kyū seki	Mukō		Nagaoka-kyō Palace Site	34°56′29″N 135°42′10″E	2	1720
Toba Imperial Villa Site 鳥羽殿跡 Toba-rikyu ato	Fushimi-ku, Kyoto	Heian period palace traces	Toba-rikyu Site	34°56′57″N 135°44′38″E	2	1740
Tsubai Ōtsukayama Kofun 椿井大塚山古墳 Tsubai Ōtsukayama kofun	Kizugawa	Kofun period tumulus	Tsubai Ōtsukayama Kofun	34°45′45″N 135°49′04″E	1	3263
Amazuka Kofun 天塚古墳 Amazuka kofun	Ukyō-ku, Kyoto	Kofun period tumulus	Amazuka Kofun	35°00′25″N 135°42′43″E	1	1739
Tenryū-ji Gardens 天龍寺庭園 Tenryūji teien	Ukyō-ku, Kyoto	also a Special Place of Scenic Beauty; component of the World Heritage Site Historic Monuments of Ancient Kyoto (Kyoto, Uji and Otsu Cities)	Tenryūji Gardens	35°00′57″N 135°40′23″E	8	1649
Tōkaian Shoin Gardens 東海庵書院庭園 Tōkaian shoin teien	Ukyō-ku, Kyoto	also a Place of Scenic Beauty; subtemple of Myōshin-ji		35°01′22″N 135°43′14″E	8	1674
Nanzen-in Gardens 南禅院庭園 Nanzen-in teien	Sakyō-ku, Kyoto	also a Place of Scenic Beauty; subtemple of Nanzen-ji	Nanzen-in Gardens	35°00′36″N 135°47′37″E	8	1647
Nanzen-ji Precinct 南禅寺境内 Nanzenji keidai	Sakyō-ku, Kyoto		Nanzenji Precinct	35°00′40″N 135°47′32″E	3	00003441
Hiyoshigaoka - Akashi Tumuli 日吉ヶ丘・明石墳墓群 Hiyoshigaoka Akashi funbo-gun	Yosano	Kofun period tumulus		35°30′20″N 135°06′37″E	1	00003457
Shirageyama Kofun 白米山古墳 Shirageyama kofun	Yosano	Kofun period tumulus	Shirageyama Kofun	35°29′46″N 135°06′09″E	1	3332
Hakoishihama Site 函石浜遺物包含地 Hakoishihama iseki hōgan-chi	Kyōtango	Yayoi period settlement traces	Hakoishihama Site	35°38′57″N 134°56′27″E	1	1635
Hayaagari Tile Kiln Site 隼上り瓦窯跡 Hayaagari kawara gama ato	Uji	Nara period kiln traces		34°54′23″N 135°48′35″E	6	1747
Ebisuyama Kofun 蛭子山古墳 Ebisuyama kofun	Yosano	Kofun period tumulus	Ebisuyama Kofun	35°30′25″N 135°06′17″E	1	1668
Heian Palace Site 平安宮跡 Heian-kyū seki	Nakagyō-ku, Kamigyō-ku, Kyoto	designation includes the sites of the Dairi (内裏跡), Chōdō-in (朝堂院跡), and Buraku-in (豊楽院跡)		35°01′05″N 135°44′24″E	2	1751
Hirakawa temple ruins 平川廃寺跡 Hirakawa haiji ato	Jōyō	Nara period temple traces	Hirakawa Haiji Site	34°51′45″N 135°46′40″E	2	1734
Byōdō-in Gardens 平等院庭園 Byōdō-in teien	Uji	also a Place of Scenic Beauty; component of the World Heritage Site Historic Monuments of Ancient Kyoto (Kyoto, Uji and Otsu Cities)	Byōdō-in Gardens	34°53′21″N 135°48′30″E	3, 8	1642
Hōkō-ji Daibutsuden Site, Stone Wall and Stone Tō 方広寺大仏殿跡及び石塁・石塔 Hōkōji daibutsuden ato oyobi sekirui・sekitō	Higashiyama-ku, Kyoto		Hōkōji Daibutsuden Site, Stone Wall and Stone Tō	34°59′29″N 135°46′13″E	3	1726
Hongan-ji Precinct 本願寺境内 Honganji keidai	Shimogyō-ku, Kyoto	component of the World Heritage Site Historic Monuments of Ancient Kyoto (Kyoto, Uji and Otsu Cities)	Honganji Precinct	34°59′32″N 135°45′08″E	3	1754
Hongan-ji Ōshoin Gardens 本願寺大書院庭園 Honganji ōshoin teien	Shimogyō-ku, Kyoto	component of the World Heritage Site Historic Monuments of Ancient Kyoto (Kyoto, Uji and Otsu Cities)	Honganji Ōshoin Gardens	34°59′27″N 135°45′05″E	8	1687
Myōshin-ji Precinct 妙心寺境内 Myōshinji keidai	Ukyō-ku, Kyoto		Myōshinji Precinct	35°01′25″N 135°43′14″E	3, 8	1727
Myōshin-ji Gardens 妙心寺庭園 Myōshinji teien	Ukyō-ku, Kyoto	also a Place of Scenic Beauty		35°01′19″N 135°43′12″E	8	1672
Arashiyama 嵐山 Arashiyama	Ukyō-ku, Nishikyō-ku, Kyoto	also a Place of Scenic Beauty	Arashiyama	35°00′35″N 135°40′03″E	2, 3, 7	1659
Ryōan-ji Hōjō Gardens 龍安寺方丈庭園 Ryōanji hōjō teien	Ukyō-ku, Kyoto	also a Special Place of Scenic Beauty; component of the World Heritage Site Historic Monuments of Ancient Kyoto (Kyoto, Uji and Otsu Cities)	Ryōanji Hōjō Gardens	35°02′04″N 135°43′05″E	8	1654
Reiun-in Gardens 霊雲院庭園 Reiun-in teien	Ukyō-ku, Kyoto	also a Place of Scenic Beauty; subtemple of Myōshin-ji		35°01′23″N 135°43′09″E	8	1675
Rai Sanyō Study 賴山陽書斎（山紫水明処） Rai Sanyō shosai (sanshisui meisho)	Kamigyō-ku, Kyoto			35°01′05″N 135°46′15″E	8	1640
Ishinokarato Kofun 石のカラト古墳 Ishinokarato kofun	Kizugawa	Kofun period tumulus; designation includes an area of Nara in Nara Prefecture	Ishinokarato Kofun	34°43′26″N 135°46′43″E	1	3099
Nara-yama Tile Kiln Sites 奈良山瓦窯跡 Nara-yama kawara gama ato	Kizugawa	designation includes the Utahime (歌姫瓦窯跡), Onjogadani (音如ヶ谷瓦窯跡), Ichisaka (市坂瓦窯跡), Umedani (梅谷瓦窯跡), Kaseyama (鹿背山瓦窯跡), and Nakayama (中山瓦窯跡) Tile Kiln Sites and an area of Nara in Nara Prefecture		34°43′04″N 135°48′55″E	6	3093
Lake Biwa Canal 琵琶湖疏水 Biwa-ko sosui	Kyōto	designation includes an area of Ōtsu in Shiga Prefecture	Lake Biwa Canal	35°00′40″N 135°51′21″E	6	3098
Nariai-ji Old Precinct 成相寺旧境内 Nariai-ji kyū-keidai	Miyazu	Nara period temple on the Saigoku Kannon Pilgrimage route		35°35′44″N 135°11′15″E	3	00003948
Uji Kofun Cluster 宇治古墳群 Uji kofun-gun	Uji	Kofun period burial mounds; designation comprises four mounds: Kannonyama Kofun (観音山古墳), Futagoyama Kofun (North Mound) (二子山古墳北墳), Futagoyama Kofun (South Mound) (二子山古墳南墳), and Kawarazuka Kofun (瓦塚古墳)	Uji Kofun Cluster	34°55′06″N 135°47′51″E	1	00004041
Mozume Castle Site 物集女城跡; Mozume-jō ato	Mukō			34°57′46″N 135°41′43″E		

== Prefectural Historic Sites ==
As of 1 May 2024, twenty-six Sites have been designated as being of prefectural importance.

Site	Municipality	Comments	Image	Coordinates	Type	Ref.
Jizōyama Tomb 地蔵山墳墓; Jizōyama funbo	Yosano			35°31′46″N 135°05′16″E		
Takiokada Kofun 滝岡田古墳; Takiokada kofun	Yosano			35°28′53″N 135°05′09″E		
Tanabe Tenjinyama Site 田辺天神山遺跡; Tanabe Tenjinyama iseki	Kyōtanabe			34°48′10″N 135°46′28″E		
Takayama No.12 Tumulus 高山十二号墳; Takayama jūni-gō fun	Kyōtango			35°42′42″N 135°05′25″E		
Chōjamori Kofun 長者森古墳; Chōjamori kofun	Fukuchiyama			35°19′47″N 134°56′51″E		
Enjo Site Iron Workshop Site 遠處遺跡製鉄工房跡; Enjo iseki seitetsu kōbō ato	Kyōtango			35°40′48″N 135°03′59″E		
Kuroda Kofun 黒田古墳; Kuroda kofun	Nantan			35°06′38″N 135°26′47″E		
Shigitani-Higashi Kofun 鴫谷東古墳; Shigitani-Higashi kofun	Yosano			35°29′41″N 135°06′33″E		
Wakutayama Kofun Cluster 湧田山古墳群; Wakutayama kofun-gun	Kyōtango			35°38′18″N 135°04′29″E		
Bōden Kofun Cluster 坊田古墳群; Bōden kofun-gun	Nantan			35°04′03″N 135°30′55″E		
Ikenooku No.5 Tumulus 池の奥５号墳; Ikenooku go-gō fun	Fukuchiyama			35°18′49″N 135°08′02″E		
Omiyame Jinja Precinct 大宮賣神社境内; Omiyame Jinja keidai	Kyōtango			35°35′28″N 135°06′07″E		
Manpuku-ji Precinct 萬福寺境内; Manpukuji keidai	Uji			34°54′51″N 135°48′22″E		
Yodo Domain Nagai Clan Graves 淀藩主永井家墓所; Yodo-han-shu Nagai-ke bosho	Uji					
Jōshōkō-ji Precinct 常照皇寺境内; Jōshōkōji keidai	Ukyō-ku, Kyoto			35°12′03″N 135°41′08″E		
Zezu Site 銭司遺跡; Zezu iseki	Kizugawa			34°45′50″N 135°53′18″E		
Shūzan Haiji Site 周山廃寺跡; Shūzan haiji ato	Ukyō-ku, Kyoto			35°09′27″N 135°38′08″E		
Kitsunedani Cave Tomb Cluster 狐谷横穴群; Kitsunedani yokoana-gun	Yawata			34°50′51″N 135°43′07″E		
Heian-kyō Ukyō Ichijō Sanbōkyū-chō Site 平安京右京一条三坊九町遺跡; Heian-kyō Ukyō ichijō Sanbōkyū-chō iseki	Kita-ku, Kyoto			35°01′23″N 135°43′32″E		
Mineyama Domain Kyōgoku Clan Graves 峯山藩主京極家墓所; Mineyama-han-shu Kyōgoku-ke bosho	Kyōtango	at Jōryū-ji (常立寺)		35°37′44″N 135°03′14″E		
Ushirono Maruyama Kofun 後野円山古墳群; Ushirono Maruyama kofun	Yosano			35°29′49″N 135°06′09″E		
Kurobe Chōshiyama Kofun 黒部銚子山古墳; Kurobe Chōshiyama kofun	Kyōtango			35°41′20″N 135°05′57″E		
Yubunesaka No.2 Tumulus 湯舟坂２号墳; Yubunesaka ni-gō fun	Kyōtango			35°33′43″N 134°54′59″E		
Makishōichi Kofun 牧正一古墳; Makishōichi kofun	Fukuchiyama			35°20′15″N 135°05′55″E		
Geshi Kofun Cluster - Ōmidō Tōurayama Kofun 下司古墳群・大御堂裏山古墳; Geshi kofun-gun・Ōmidō Tōurayama kofun	Kyōtanabe			34°47′55″N 135°45′56″E		
Sonobe Domain Koide Clan Graves 園部藩主小出家墓所; Sonobe-han-shu Koide-ke bosho	Nantan	at Tokuun-ji (徳雲寺)		35°05′37″N 135°29′10″E		

== Municipal Historic Sites ==
As of 1 May 2025, a further seventy-one Sites have been designated as being of municipal importance, including:

Site	Municipality	Comments	Image	Coordinates	Type	Ref.
Kuga Jinja Precinct 久我神社境内; Kuga Jinja keidai	Kita-ku, Kyoto			35°03′07″N 135°44′52″E		
Ono-no-Emishi Tomb 小野毛人墓; Ono-no-Emishi no haka	Sakyō-ku, Kyoto	on the hillside behind Sudō Jinja (崇道神社)		35°03′59″N 135°48′02″E		
Nakanotani No.4 Kiln 中の谷4号窯; Nakanotani 4-gō kama	Sakyō-ku, Kyoto			35°04′26″N 135°46′15″E		
Kibune Jinja Precinct 貴布祢神社境内; Kibune Jinja keidai	Sakyō-ku, Kyoto			35°07′18″N 135°45′46″E		
Heian Palace Mikinotsukasa Warehouse Site 平安宮造酒司倉庫跡; Heian-kyū Mikinotsukasa sōko ato	Nakagyō-ku, Kyoto	on the site is Kyoto City Heiankyo Sōsei-Kan Museum (京都市平安京創生館)		35°01′08″N 135°44′18″E		
Hōkan-ji Precinct 法観寺境内; Hōkan-ji keidai	Higashiyama-ku, Kyoto			34°59′55″N 135°46′45″E		
Konoshimanimasuamaterumitama Jinja Precinct 木嶋坐天照御霊神社（蚕の社）境内; Konoshimanimasuamaterumitama Jinja (Kaiko no Yashiro) keidai	Ukyō-ku, Kyoto			35°00′53″N 135°42′49″E		
Henshō-ji Old Precinct 遍照寺旧境内建物跡; Henshōji kyū-keidai tatemono ato	Ukyō-ku, Kyoto			35°01′25″N 135°41′21″E		
Kaminaka Castle Site 上中城跡; Kaminaka-jō ato	Ukyō-ku, Kyoto			35°11′55″N 135°38′17″E		
Tsukiyomi Jinja Precinct 月読神社境内; Tsukiyomi Jinja keidai	Nishikyō-ku, Kyoto			34°59′48″N 135°41′10″E		
Ōeyama Kofun Cluster 大枝山古墳群（6～12，15，16，18～21号墳）附14号墳; Ōeyama kofun-gun	Nishikyō-ku, Kyoto	designation comprises kofun No.6, 7, 8, 8, 10, 11, 12, 15, 16, 18, 19, 20, 21		34°58′53″N 135°40′11″E		
Hazukashinimasutakamimusubi Jinja Precinct 羽束師坐高御産日神社境内; Hazukashinimasutakamimusubi Jinja keidai	Fushimi-ku, Kyoto			34°55′46″N 135°43′23″E		
Hōkai-ji Precinct 法界寺境内; Hōkaiji keidai	Fushimi-ku, Kyoto			34°56′03″N 135°48′54″E		
Anrakuju-in Precinct 安樂壽院境内; Anrakuju-in keidai	Fushimi-ku, Kyoto			34°57′07″N 135°45′16″E		

== Registered Historic Sites ==
As of 1 December 2025, one Monument has been registered (as opposed to designated) as an Historic Site at a national level.

Place	Municipality	Comments	Image	Coordinates	Type	Ref.
Kumohara Erosion Control Facilities 雲原砂防関連施設群; Kumohara sabō kanren shisetsu-gun	Fukuchiyama			35°26′38″N 135°04′25″E		

== See also ==
- Cultural Properties of Japan
- Yamashiro, Tanba, and Tango Provinces
- Kyoto National Museum
- List of Places of Scenic Beauty of Japan (Kyōto)
- List of Cultural Properties of Japan - paintings (Kyōto)
- List of Cultural Properties of Japan - historical materials (Kyōto)
