= Katagihara temple ruins =

- 樫原廃寺跡 (Japanese)
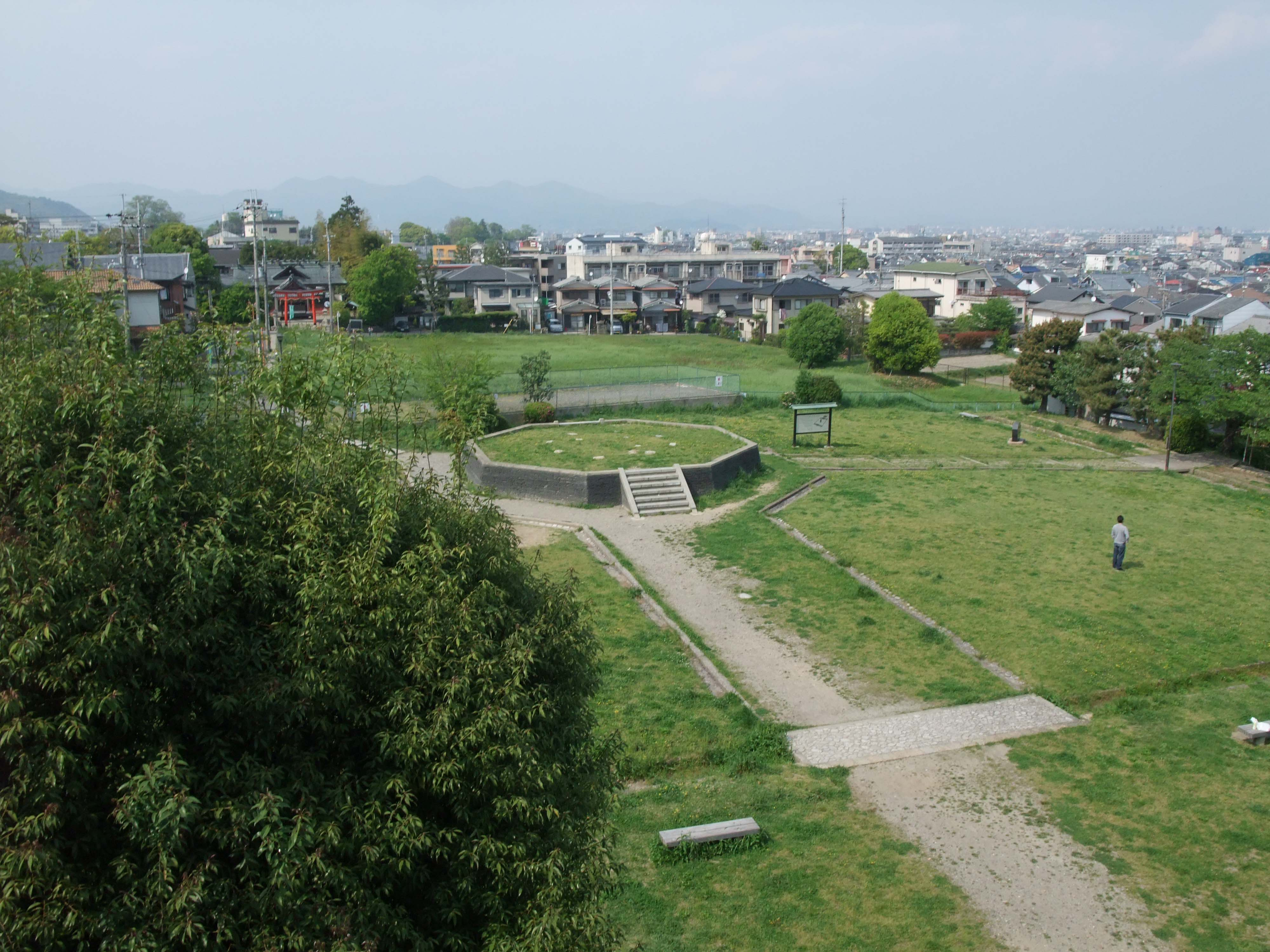
- Katagihara temple ruins

- Katagihara temple ruins Katagihara temple ruins (Japan)
- Interactive map of Katagihara temple ruins
- 34°58′14.05″N 135°41′26.2″E
- Type: temple ruins
- Periods: Hakuhō period
- Location: Nishikyō-ku, Kyoto, Japan
- Region: Kansai region

History
- Built: c. 7th century AD

Site notes
- Public access: Yes (park)

Katagihara temple ruins (樫原廃寺跡, Katagihara Haiji ato) is an archaeological site with the ruins of an Asuka period Buddhist temple located in the Katagihara neighborhood of the Nishikyō ward of the city of Kyoto, Japan. The temple no longer exists, and its ruins were designated a National Historic Site in 1971, with the area under protection expanded in 1990.

== Overview ==
The Katagihara temple ruins are located at the eastern foot of the Nagaoka Hills in the southwestern part Kyoto. It was discovered in 1967 during the construction of public housing. As a result of archaeological excavations, the remains of an octagonal Pagoda was discovered, along with the remains of an inner gate to the south and an earthen wall around the east and west sides. Subsequent excavations uncovered the remains of a corridor and three post-hole foundation buildings that mark the northern edge of the temple grounds, as well as a building foundation platform to the north of the tower. These excavations indicate that the temple layout had been patterned after Shitennō-ji in Osaka, with an inner gate, pagoda, main hall, and lecture hall lined up in a straight line from north-to-south. The temple was constructed in the Hakuhō period (673–686) and abandoned in the mid-Heian period, but does not appear in any historical documentation, so its history and even its name are unknown. An octagonal pagoda is extremely rare in Japan.

The site has been developed as a park, with the base foundation for the octagonal pagoda restored.

== See also ==
- List of Historic Sites of Japan (Kyoto)
- Anraku-ji (Ueda), the only extant octagonal pagoda in Japan.
