= Shibagahara Kofun =

Kofun period keyhole-shaped burial mound in Japan

- 芝ヶ原古墳 (Japanese)
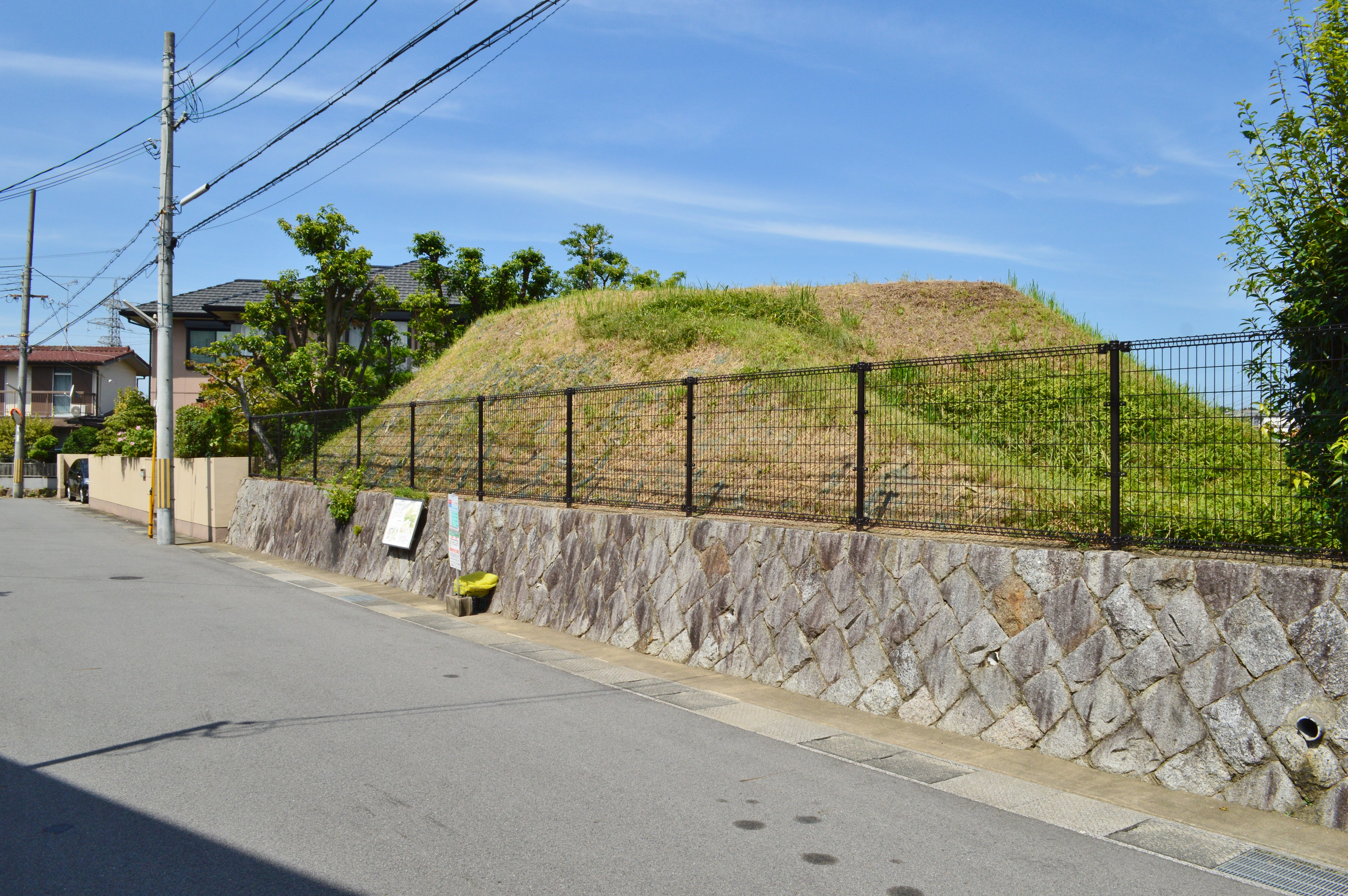
- Shibagahara Kofun

- Shibagahara Kofun Shibagahara Kofun (Japan)
- Interactive map of Shibagahara Kofun
- 34°51′45.89″N 135°47′0.81″E
- Type: Kofun
- Periods: Kofun period
- Location: Jōyō, Kyōto, Japan
- Region: Kansai region

History
- Built: c.3rd century

Site notes
- Public access: Yes (no facilities)

The Shibagahara Kofun (芝ヶ原古墳) is a Kofun period keyhole-shaped burial mound, located in the Terada Otani neighborhood of the city of Jōyō, Kyōto in the Kansai region of Japan. The tumulus was designated a National Historic Site of Japan in 1989. The artifacts excavated from the tumulus were collectively designated a National Important Cultural Property in 1990.

== Overview ==
The Shibagahara Kofun is a zenpō-kōhō-fun (前方後方墳), which is shaped like two co-joined rectangles when viewed from above (not in the shape of a Keyhole). The posterior portion has a length of 21 meters and width of 19 meters, whereas the anterior portion has been largely leveled and has a surviving length of only 3.5 meters. The mound is not terraced, and no traces of fukiishi roofing stones have been found. The natural terrain on the north side of the mound is low, and the base of the mound is cut away to create a base, while the east side is divided by a ditch. The thickness of the surviving moat embankment is around two meters.

It is Kofun No.12 in the Shibagahara Kofun cluster, consisting of 13 burial mounds distributed some 500 meters southeast of the Kutsugawa Kofun cluster (which has a separate National Historical Site designation) located in the northern part of the city. Archaeological excavations were conducted in 1986 prior to the development of a residential area.

The tumulus was found to contain a combination wooden coffin buried directly inside the burial pit. The coffin was three by 0.8 meters. The top of the burial pit is covered with gravel, from which pottery offerings such as jars and tall cups have been excavated. A bronze mirror shaped like four animals, two bronze bracelets, eight jadeite magatama, 187 jasper tubular beads, and 1,276 small glass beads were excavated from near the northern wooden opening of the coffin. The pottery excavated from the gravel bed is of an ancient appearance, in the "Shonai style", with a double rim for the jar and wavy, horizontal line, and circular floating patterns on the rim, and wavy, blind, horizontal line, and mountain-shaped patterns on the body. The bronze bracelet has 72 radial lines on the round bracelet, with the tips of the lines spaced apart, and the shape of the lines and edges of the bronze bracelet retains the characteristics of the older style. Shibagahara Tomb No. 12 is thus a kofun from the period when the "keyhole-style" emerged.

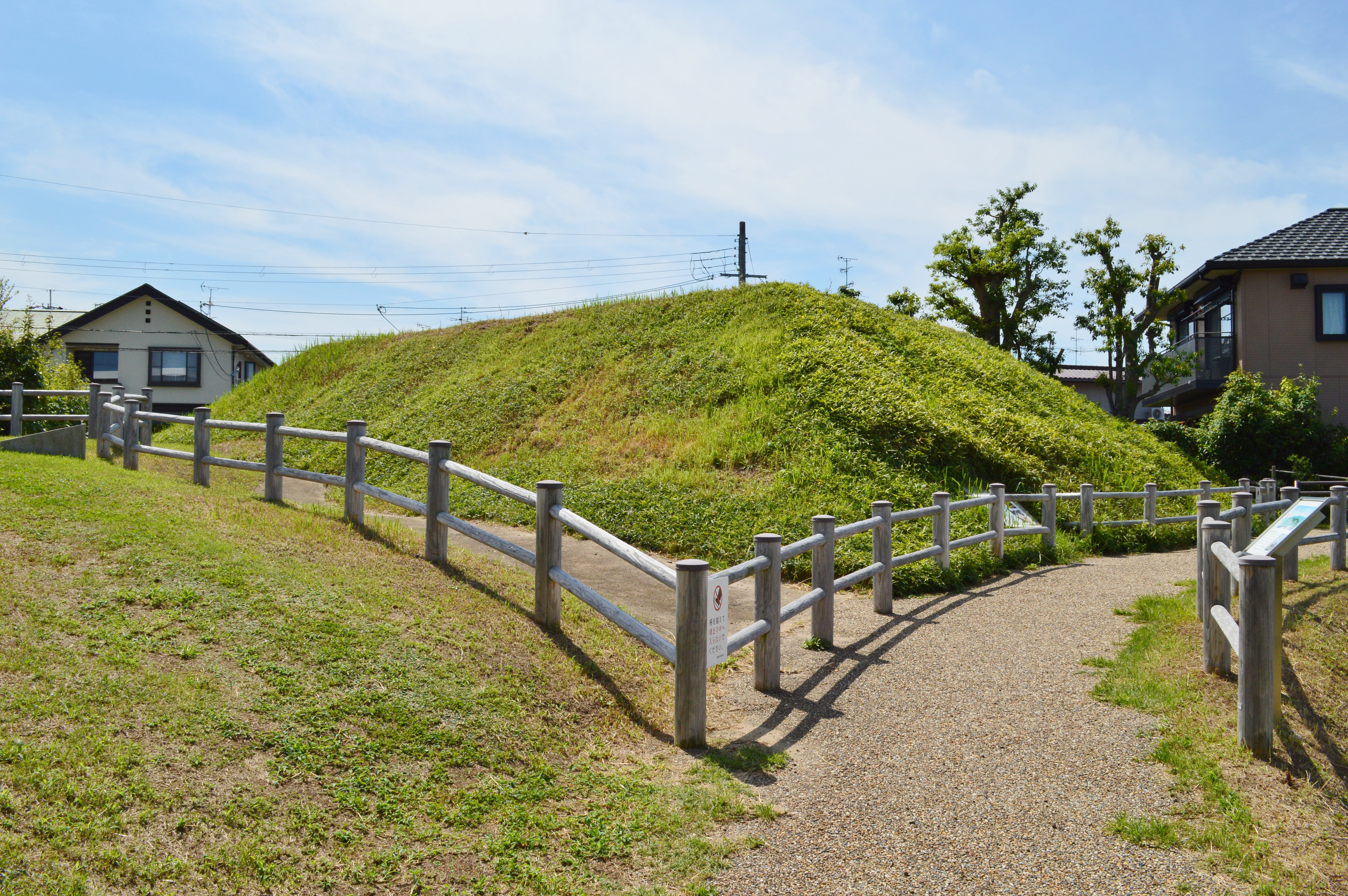
Shibagahara Kofun

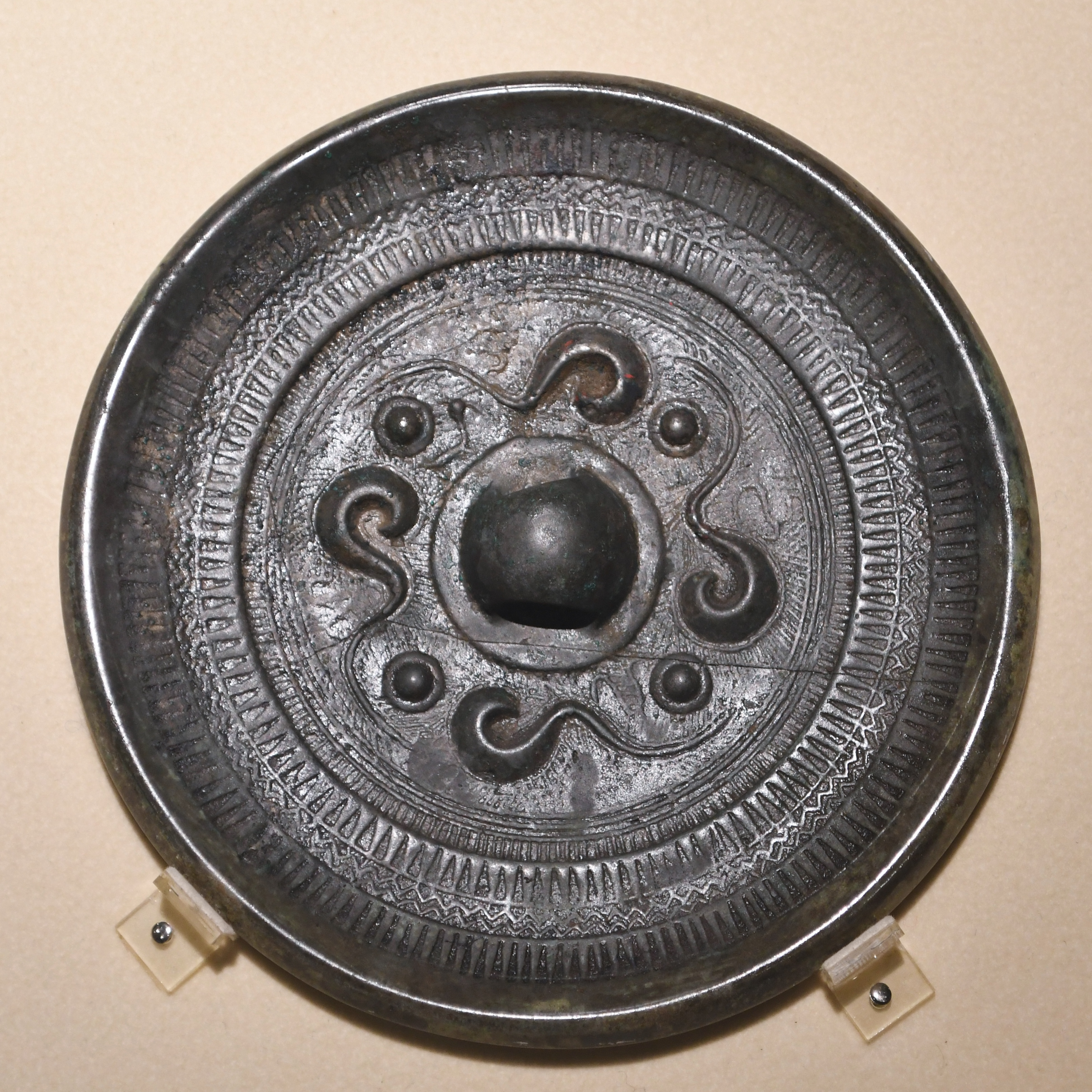
Bronze Mirror from Shibagahara Kofun

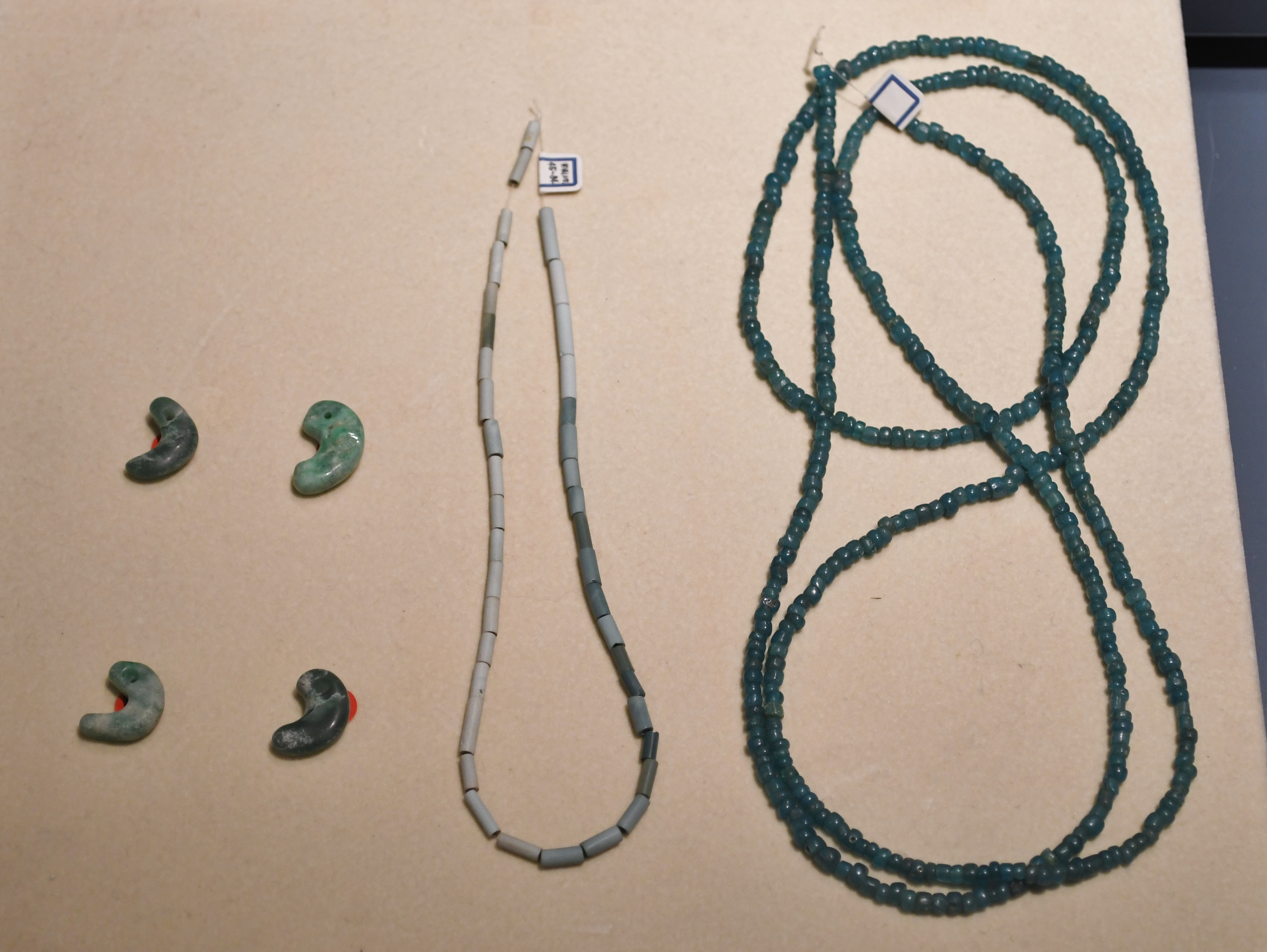
Grave Goods from Shibagahara Kofun

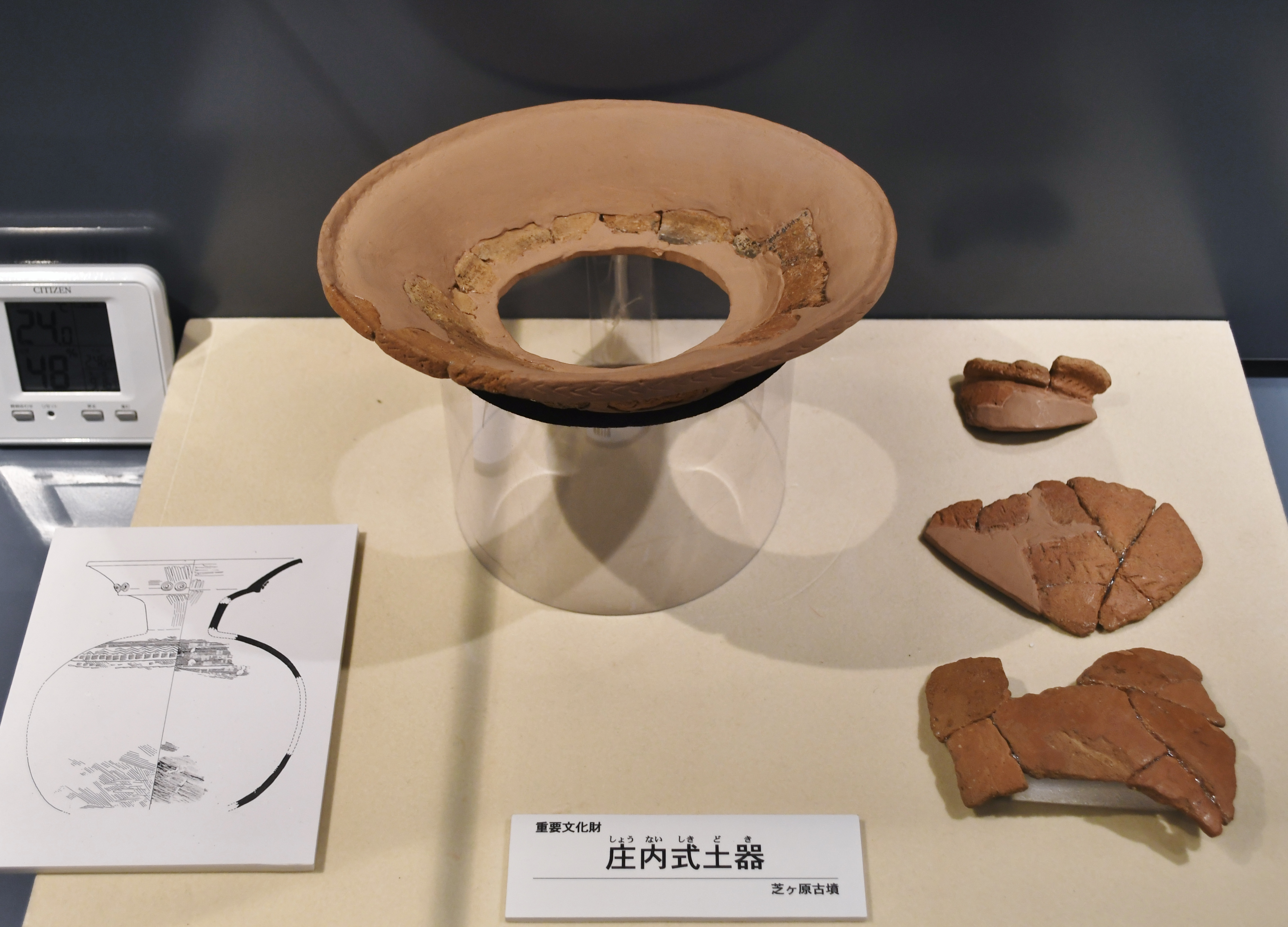
Pottery shards from Shibagahara Kofun

Within the cluster, Kofun No. 1 to No. 9 consist of two keyhole-shaped tombs and seven circular enpun (円墳)-style tumuli, and have been preserved as they are. Kofun No. 10 and No. 11 are large circular tumuli and were found to contain clay coffins, and a triangular-rimmed divine beast mirror was excavated from Kofun No. 11,. Kofun No. 13 is a hōfun (方墳)-style square tomb that has been preserved as it is.

The kofun is estimated to have been built in the mid-3rd century, near the beginning of the Kofun period. In the southern Yamashiro region, it precedes the Tsubai Ōtsukayama Kofun. The site is now preserved as a park, and is about a 15-minute walk from Jōyō Station on the JR West Nara Line.

== See also ==
- List of Historic Sites of Japan (Kyoto)
