= Narayama Tile Kiln Sites =

- 奈良山瓦窯跡 (Japanese)
- Narayama Tile Kiln Sites Narayama Tile Kiln Sites (Japan)
- Interactive map of Narayama Tile Kiln Sites
- 34°43′04″N 135°48′55″E
- Periods: Nara period
- Location: Nara, Nara and Kizugawa, Kyoto, Japan
- Region: Kansai region

Site notes
- Public access: Yes (no public facilities)

The Narayama Tile Kiln Sites (奈良山瓦窯跡, Narayama kawara gama ato) is the collective name for several archaeological sites containing Nara period kilns located in northern Nara city in Nara Prefecture and southern Kizugawa city in Kyoto Prefecture in the Kansai region of Japan. The site was designated a National Historic Site of Japan in 1976 with the area under protection expanded in 2010.

== Overview ==
The Narayama kiln ruins are located in the gentle hill range at an elevation of 90 to 100 meters to the north of the site of Heijō-kyō palace, the capital of Japan in the Nara period. The hills are dotted with the remains of several kilns that fired roof tiles for the palace and temples of Heijō-kyō. Kawara (瓦) roof tiles made of fired clay were introduced to Japan from Baekche during the 6th century along with Buddhism. During the 570s under the reign of Emperor Bidatsu, the king of Baekche sent six people to Japan skilled in various aspects of Buddhism, including a temple architect. Initially, tiled roofs were a sign of great wealth and prestige, and used for temple and government buildings. The material had the advantages of great strength and durability, and could also be made at locations around the country wherever clay was available.

At the Utahime Tile Kiln ruins (歌姫瓦窯跡) the existence of six semi-underground flat kilns lined up from north-to-south has been confirmed, with the existence of two or three more flat-type kilns suspected to exist to the south of those. The one at the southern end is the best preserved, and is a flat kiln with a total length of 4.2 meters, with tahe rotisserie type structure with a flame passage with seven flame vents that separate the combustion chamber from the firing chamber. The kiln walls are made of flat tiles and clay, and the fire hole is made of stone. The firing chamber is about 0.5 meters higher than the combustion chamber and measures 1.1 meters in length and 2.3 meters in width. The roof tiles fired at this tile kiln site are mainly round tiles and flat tiles, and are the same as the roof tiles found at the Heijō-kyō Palace from the end of the Nara period. It was designated a National Historic Site in 1976. It is located on the east-facing slope of the western hill facing the Shika River in northern Nara.

Four sets of kiln remains are all located in Kizugawa. The Onjogadani Tile Kiln ruins (音如ヶ谷瓦窯跡) consist of four kiln remains and several post-hole buildings. It has been confirmed as the location where the roof tiles for the temple of Hokke-ji were fired. Currently, the tile kiln site has been backfilled and is preserved, and full-size replicas of the two kiln in good condition have been made and are on display. The Ichisaka Tile Kiln ruins (市坂瓦窯跡) contains traces of four buildings and eight kilns . The Umedani Tile Kiln ruins (Umedani) has been confirmed as the location where the roof tiles for the temple of Kofuku-ji were fired. Seven kiln remains have been found. At the Kaseyama Tile Kiln ruins (鹿背山瓦窯跡), a clay pit and parts of "mokko" (wooden sacks) used for transportation of roof tiles were excavated along with the remains of two kilns.

The Nakayama Tile Kiln ruins (中山瓦窯跡), which has been newly designated, was discovered in 1972 and found to be a kiln that supplied tiles for the construction of the first Daigokuden-in Hall of Heijō-kyō Palace, making it an important archaeological site as the earliest operating tile kiln on Narayama. Ten kilns have been identified, including rebuilt ones, and there are differences in their structures. They are thought to have been in operation between the time when the capital was moved to Nara (710) and when it was temporarily moved to Kuni-kyo (740). The site is currently preserved in a backfilled state within a private residential area.

The Utahime Tile Kiln ruins are about a 10-minute walk from Heijoyama Station on the JR West Kansai Main Line.

== See also ==
- List of Historic Sites of Japan (Kyoto)
- List of Historic Sites of Japan (Nara)
