= Moriyama Site =

Jōmon period archaeological site in Jōyō, Kyoto, Japan

Moriyama ruins
- 森山遺跡 (Japanese)
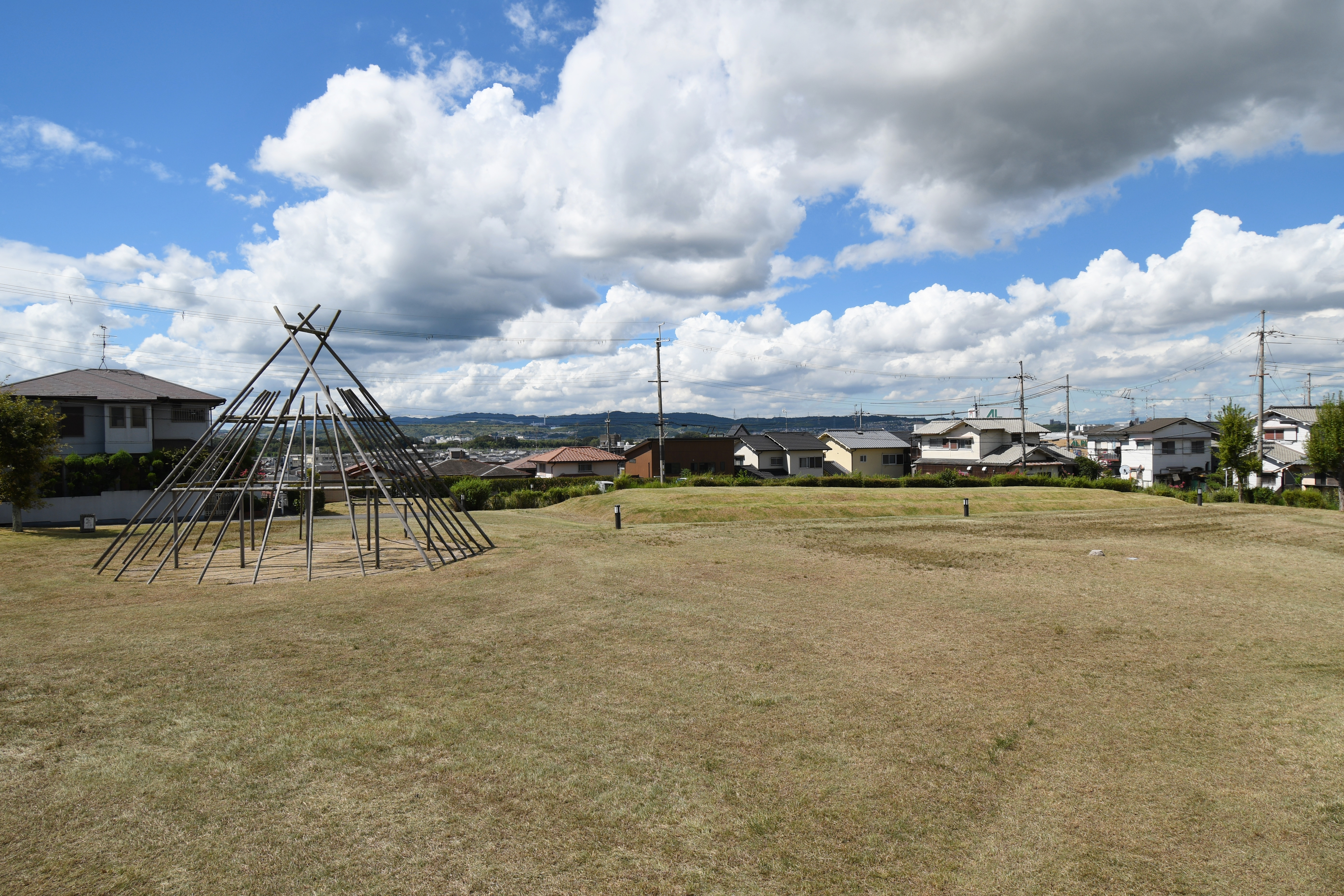
- Moriyama ruins

- Moriyama ruins Moriyama Site (Japan)
- Interactive map of Moriyama ruins
- 34°50′36″N 135°47′27″E
- Type: settlement
- Periods: Jōmon - Kofun period
- Location: Jōyō, Kyoto, Japan
- Region: Kinai region

Site notes
- Public access: Yes (no facilities)

The Moriyama ruins (森山遺跡, Moriyama iseki) is an archaeological site containing the ruins of a Jōmon period through Kofun period settlement located in what is now the Tomino-Moriyama neighborhood of the city of Jōyō, Kyoto in the Kinai region of Japan. The site was designated a National Historic Site of Japan in 1978.

== Overview ==
The Moriyama site is located on a plateau overlooking the Kizugawa River, which flows north and south along the western edge of Jōyō city. It is the remains of a village centered around the late mid-Jōmon period, and there are also remains and relics from the Yayoi period and Kofun period. The foundations of five Jōmon period dwellings, including one circular pit dwelling with a diameter of approximately ten meters, and another with a diameter of six to ten meters. A slightly sunken underground hearth was installed on the floor of the pit dwelling, and there are earthen pits of unknown nature around the dwelling, and a central plaza around which the pit dwellings were arranged. On the southern edge of the settlement was the remains of a stone structure made up of fist-sized debris, which may be the site of a grave. Relics from the Jōmon period include earthenware from the middle to late Jōmon period, as well as 170 stone arrowheads, 55 stone tools, four polished stones, and four stone sticks. There were also a large number of sanukite lithic flakes, indicating that stone tool production was active. As one of few villages from the Jōmon period in the Kinai region to have been discovered, it is important as a core village site with a wealth of artifacts. Remains from the Yayoi period include two pit dwellings sites and one grave, and there are also twelve pit dwelling traces and one grave from the Kofun period, indicating continuous settlement over many centuries. Particularly noteworthy from the early Kofun period is a rectangular trapezoid burial mound measuring 40 meters from east-to-west and 32 meters from north-to-south, surrounded by a moat four meters wide and 1.5 meters deep. A large concentration of ancient Haji ware pottery and small round-bottom pottery have been unearthed from the southwest corner of this moat, and are thought to have been used in funeral rituals.

Some of the remains have been restored as an archaeological park. The site is about a 15 minutes walk from Nagaike Station on the JR West Nara Line.

== See also ==
- List of Historic Sites of Japan (Kyoto)
