= Kurusuno Tile Kiln ruins =

- 栗栖野瓦窯跡 (Japanese)
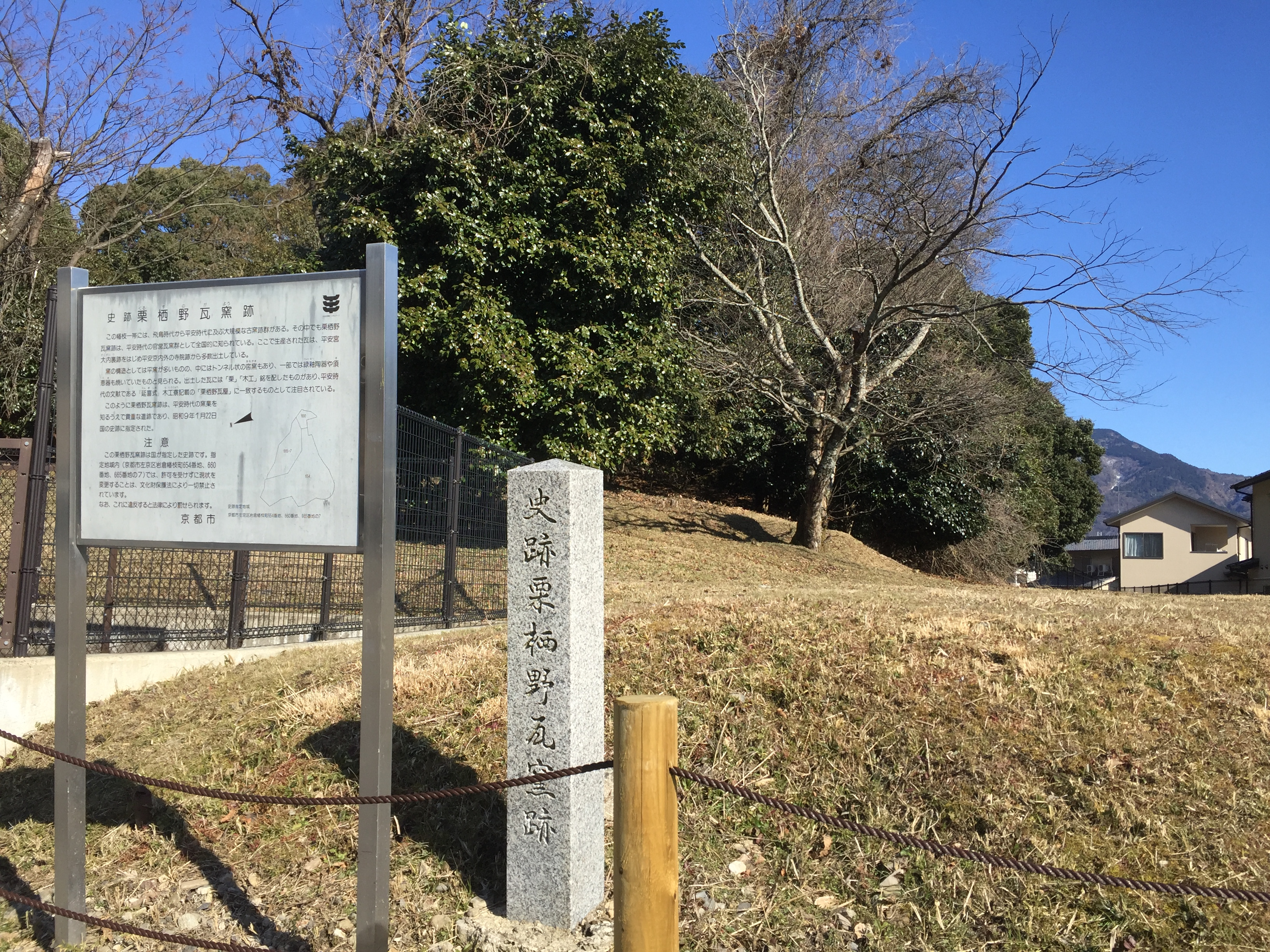
- Kurusuno Tile Kiln ruins

- Kurusuno Tile Kiln ruins Kurusuno Tile Kiln ruins (Japan)
- Interactive map of Kurusuno Tile Kiln ruins
- 35°3′52″N 135°46′23″E
- Periods: Nara - Heian period
- Location: Sakyō-ku, Kyoto, Japan
- Region: Kansai region

Site notes
- Public access: Yes (no public facilities)

The Kurusuno Tile Kiln ruins (栗栖野瓦窯跡, Kurusuno no kawara gama ato) is an archaeological site with the remains of roof tile kilns located in the Iwakura Hataeda-cho neighborhood of Sakyō-ku, Kyoto city in the Kansai region of Japan. The site was designated a National Historic Site of Japan in 1934.

== Overview ==
The Kurusuno tile kiln ruins are located in the hills on the northern outskirts of the city, which provided good quality clay and firewood for fuel. The area has been a thriving tile manufacturing area since before the construction of Heian-kyō, and the kilns in this area were government-run and produced the roof tiles for the Heian-kyō palaces and temples such as Tō-ji and Sai-ji. Kawara (瓦) roof tiles made of fired clay were introduced to Japan from Baekche during the 6th century along with Buddhism. During the 570s under the reign of Emperor Bidatsu, the king of Baekche sent six people to Japan skilled in various aspects of Buddhism, including a temple architect. Initially, tiled roofs were a sign of great wealth and prestige, and used for temple and government buildings. The material had the advantages of great strength and durability, and could also be made at locations around the country wherever clay was available.

The Kurusuno tile kilns mentioned in the Engishiki, and operated throughout the Heian period. The site was discovered in 1930, and two tile kilns were excavated by the Kyoto Prefectural Historical Site Preservation Committee in 1934. However, the scope of the excavation was limited, and in subsequent residential development, some kiln sites have disappeared without notice outside the designated historic site area. The Kurusuno tile kiln ruins consisted of three areas, which faced each other across a flat area. These are known as the Kurisuno tile kiln ruins, Entsuji tile kiln ruins, and Minamishoda tile kiln ruins, but only part of the Kurisuno tile kiln ruins was designated as a national historic site. The Kurisuno tile kiln site is located about 200 meters north of the Minamishoda tile kiln site and the Entsuji tile kiln site is located about 450 meters west of the Minamishoda tile kiln site in a straight line. While the Kurisuno tile kilns was in operation throughout the Heian period, tiles from the Minamishoda and Entsuji tile kilns have been excavated only from the late Heian period. Therefore, it is generally believed that the Kurisuno tile kiln site was the core of the complex, and that the surrounding tile kilns were only in operation temporarily. In a subsequent excavation in 1992, a pit kiln from the early Heian period was discovered, and tiles with glaze drips remaining and fragments of a multi-mouthed bottle with two-colored glaze were excavated. This indicates that the kilns were not only a production center for roof tiles, but also a production center for green-glazed pottery. The green-glazed tiles that decorated the roof of the Daigokuden Hall of the Heian Palace were also produced at the Kurisuno kilns.

The site at present consists of a two meter long by 1.5 meter wide portion of a noborigama tunnel kiln and hearth. About 600 roof tiles still loaded in the kiln were found inside the kiln site. It has now been backfilled and is now a slope of a mountain. The site is about a 10-minute walk from Kino Station on the Eizan Electric Railway Kurama Line.

== See also ==
- List of Historic Sites of Japan (Kyoto)
