= Itsukahara Kofun =

Kofun period keyhole-shaped burial mound in Japan

- 五塚原古墳 (Japanese)
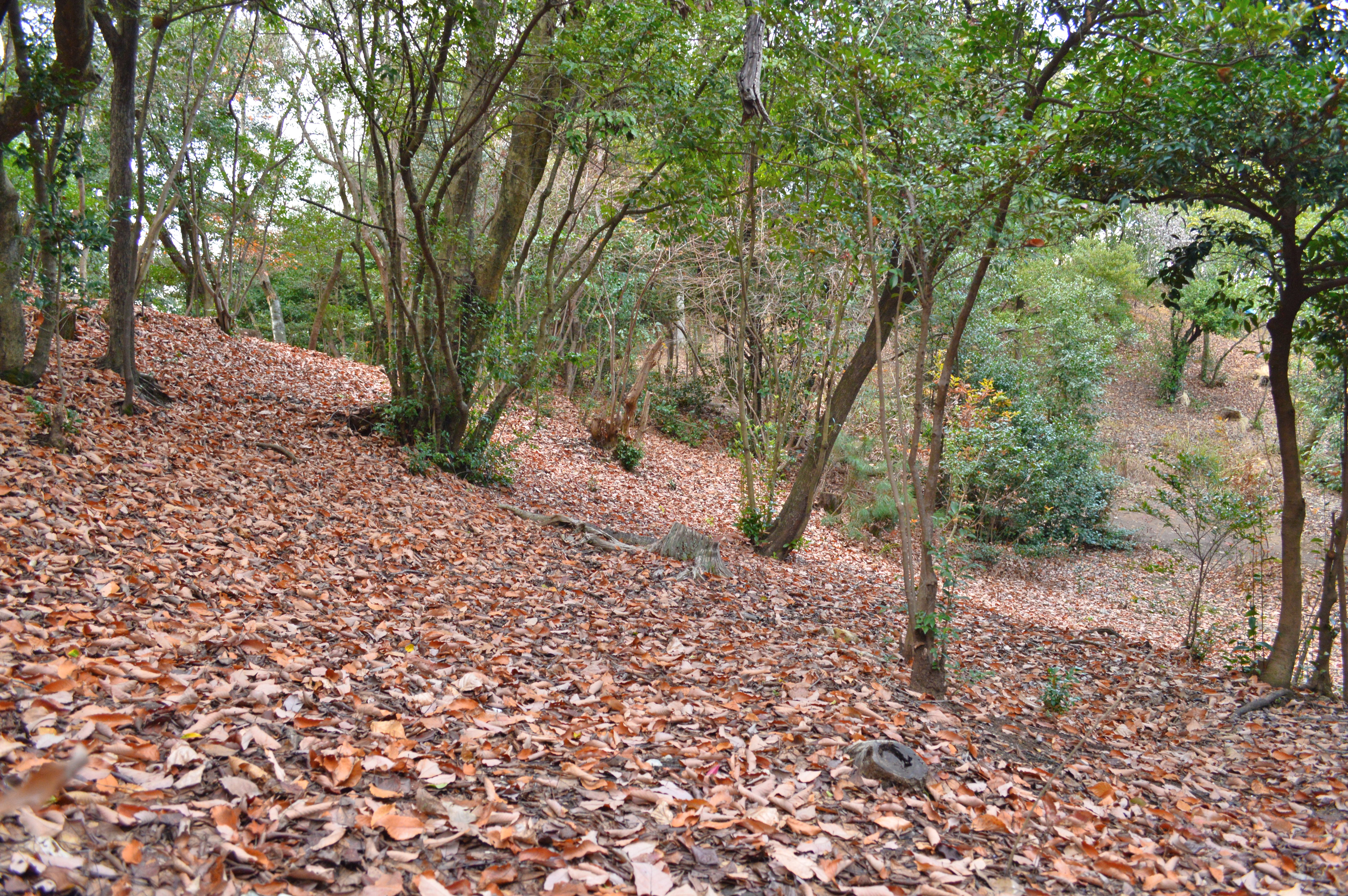
- Itsukahara Kofun

- Itsukahara Kofun Itsukahara Kofun (Japan)
- 34°56′59.71″N 135°41′42.78″E
- Type: Kofun
- Periods: Kofun period
- Location: Mukō, Kyoto, Japan
- Region: Kansai region

History
- Built: c.3rd century

Site notes
- Public access: Yes (park)
- National Historic Site of Japan 京都府内の位置

Itsukahara Kofun (五塚原古墳) is a Kofun period keyhole-shaped burial mound, located in the Shibayama, Terato-chō neighborhood of Mukō, Kyoto in the Kansai region of Japan. The tumulus was designated a National Historic Site of Japan and as part of the Otokuni Kofun Cluster in 2016. It is one of the oldest large keyhole-shaped tombs, estimated to have been built in the mid-to-late 3rd century, at the very beginning of the Kofun period.

== Overview ==
The Itsukahara Kofun was located on a ridge of the southern part of the Mukō Hills, on the southwestern edge of the Kyoto Basin. In addition to Itsukahara Kofun, there are several other large keyhole-shaped tombs distributed in the Mukō Hills, and these are collectively known as the "Mukō Hills Kofun cluster". Although part of the northwestern base of the circular mound has been leveled by residential development, the mound remains in good condition overall.

It is a zenpō-kōen-fun (前方後円墳), which is shaped like a keyhole, having one square end and one circular end, when viewed from above. The mound, which is orientated to the south, is mostly made of piled earth, with two tiers in the front and three tiers in the rear. The surface of the mound is covered by fukiishi roofing stones, but no haniwa have been found. The "sloping flat surface" of the mound is an ancient style shared with Hashihaka Kofun (in Sakurai, Nara) and the shape of the front part matches that of Higashida Ōtsuka Kofun (also in Sakurai), as such, it is a prototype for kofun such as the Andonyama Kofun in Tenri. The burial facility is a pit-type stone burial chamber at the top of the posterior circular section, made entirely of natural river stones. The chamber measures 6.2 meters long and 1.3 meters wide, and although the interior has not been investigated, it is estimated to be more than 1.5 meters deep. Prior to the excavation, electrical surveys had suggested the presence of an additional burial pit type burial in the center of the anterior rectangular portion of the tumulus. This appeared to be parallel to the main axis, measuring five meters east-to-west and seven meters north-to-south[6], but excavation failed to discover physical evidence of this burial.

In addition to the above, one clay coffin was discovered at the western foot of the rear mound.

Total length
91.2 meters:
Anterior rectangular portion
33 meters wide x 4.0 meters high, 2-tier
Posterior circular portion
55 meter diameter x 8.7 meters high, 3-tiers

The tumulus is about 1.3 kilometers west of Higashi-Mukō Station on the JR West Hankyu Kyoto Line.

== See also ==
- List of Historic Sites of Japan (Kyoto)
