= Kisaichi Maruyama Kofun =

Burial mound in Ayabe, Kyoto, Japan

- 私市円山古墳 (Japanese)
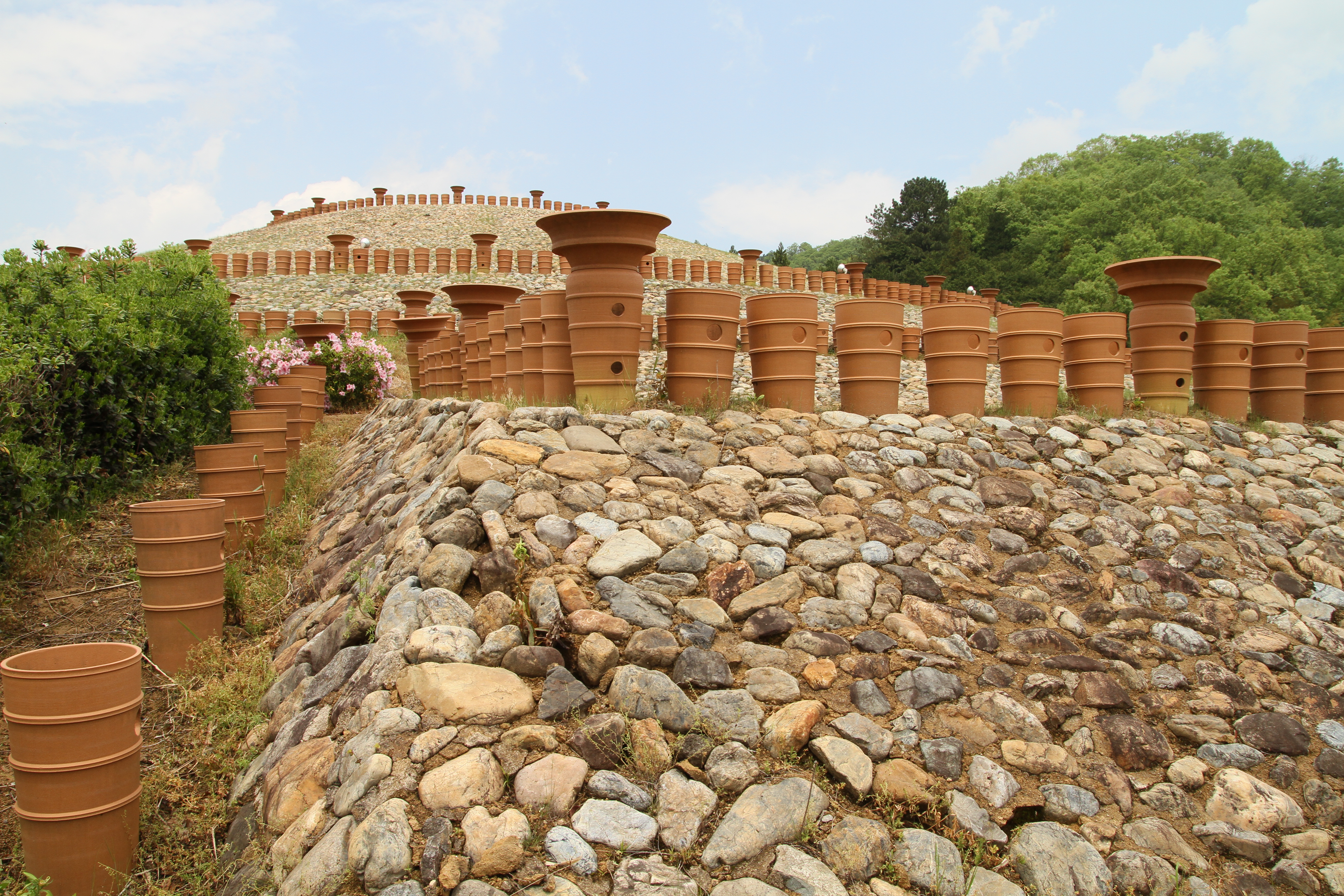
- Kisaichi Maruyama Kofun

- Kisaichi Maruyama Kofun Kisaichi Maruyama Kofun (Japan)
- Interactive map of Kisaichi Maruyama Kofun
- 35°18′51.8″N 135°11′47″E
- Type: Kofun
- Periods: Kofun period
- Location: Ayabe, Kyoto, Japan
- Region: Kansai region

History
- Built: c.mid-5th century

Site notes
- Public access: Yes (park)

The Kisaichi Maruyama Kofun (私市円山古墳) is a Kofun period burial mound, located in the Kisaichi neighborhood of the city of Ayabe, Kyoto in the Kansai region of Japan. The tumulus was designated a National Historic Site of Japan in 1994.

== Overview ==
The Kisaichi Maruyama Kofun is a circular enpun (円墳)-style tumulus with a diameter of 70 meters and a higher of 10 meters. It is located north of the center of the Fukuchiyama basin, in the central area of former Tanba Province, on the central reaches of the Yura River at an elevation of 94 meters. It was discovered during a survey accompanying the construction of the Kinki Expressway (currently Maizuru Wakasa Expressway) in 1988. Until then, the existence of the tumulus was unknown. Due to this discovery, the construction method of the highway was changed from a cutting to a tunnel, and the burial mound was to be preserved. The mound had a three-tiered structure, and river stones of the Yura River were used as fukiishi. Cylindrical haniwa were lined up on the flat part of the first and second tiers of the mound. In the archaeological excavation, figurative haniwa and haji ware pottery. including house-shaped and armor-shaped examples were excavated. The burial chamber consisted of a central main room where the coffins were located, and sub-chambers to the north and south. Wooden coffins was found in the central and northern chambers, and grave goods such as armor, iron spearheads, iron swords and other weapons, agricultural tools, bronze mirrors, and jewelry were excavated, along with a quiver containing 38 arrows. From the quality and quantity of the grave goods, it is assumed that the central burial was that of a king who ruled the middle reaches of the Yura River in the mid-fifth century, and the northern burials were possibly siblings, parents and children. Only agricultural tools were sub-burial on the south side, which is presumed to have been that of a servant.

When it was decided to preserve the tumulus, Ayabe City formulated the Kisaichi Maruyama tumulus environment improvement plan, re-laid the fukiishi, lined up replicas of cylindrical haniwa, and restored it as the "Maruyama Kofun Park" in May 1993. In August 2014, heavy rains caused damage to the northwestern section of the mound, which collapsed over a width of 10 meters.

The tumulus is about a two-kilometer walk from Takatsu Station on the JR West San'in Main Line.

== Gallery ==
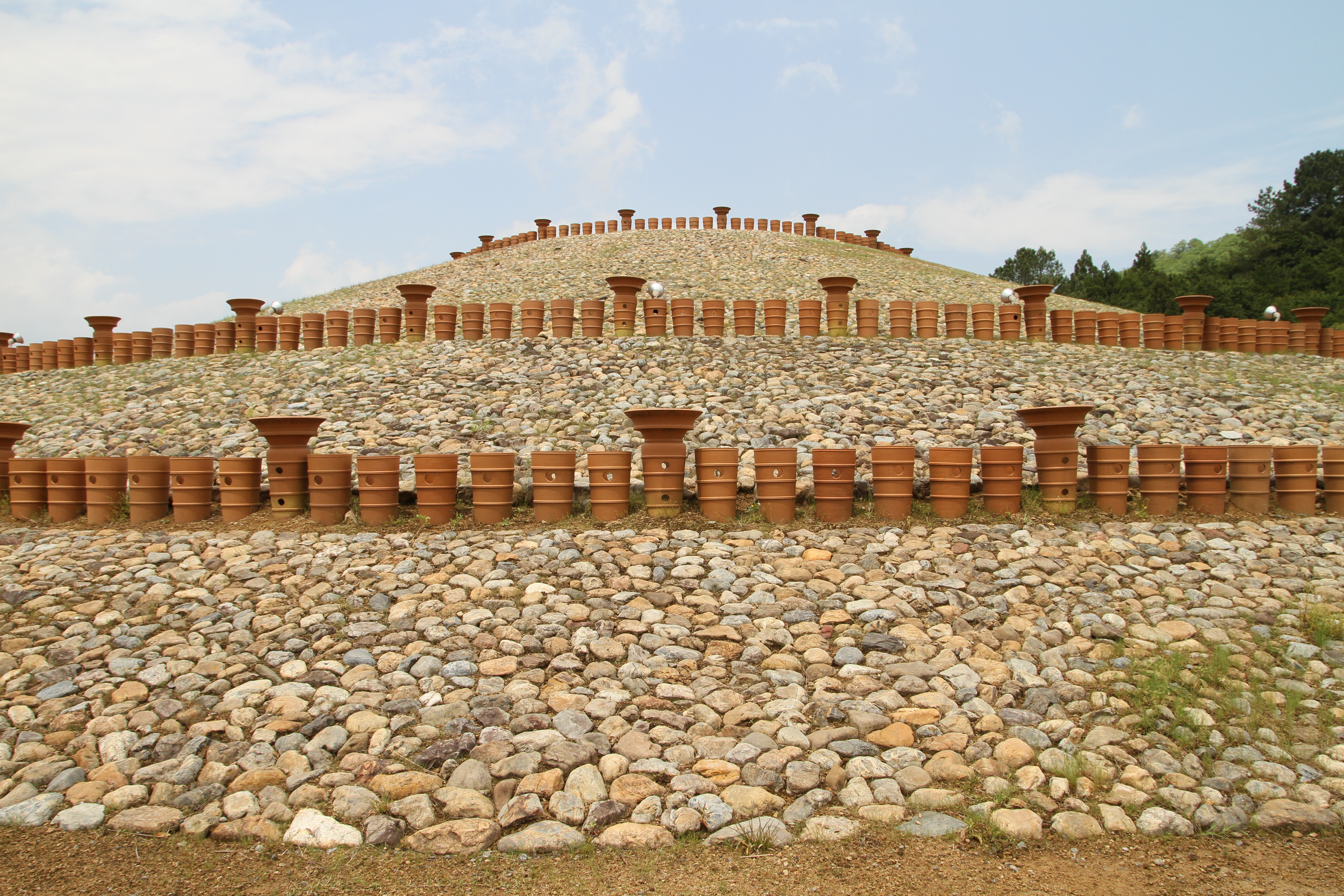
Tumulus from below

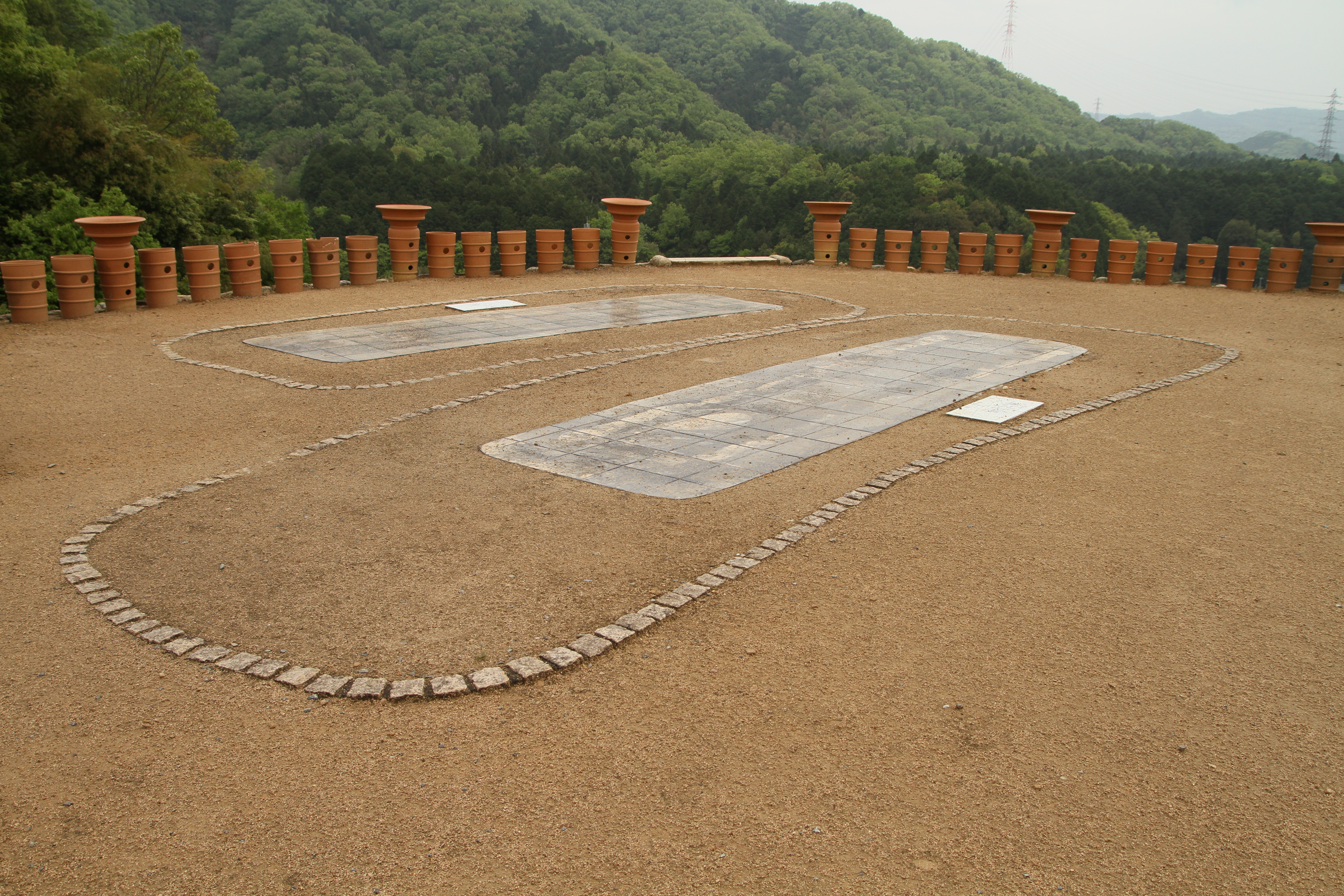
Top of tumulus

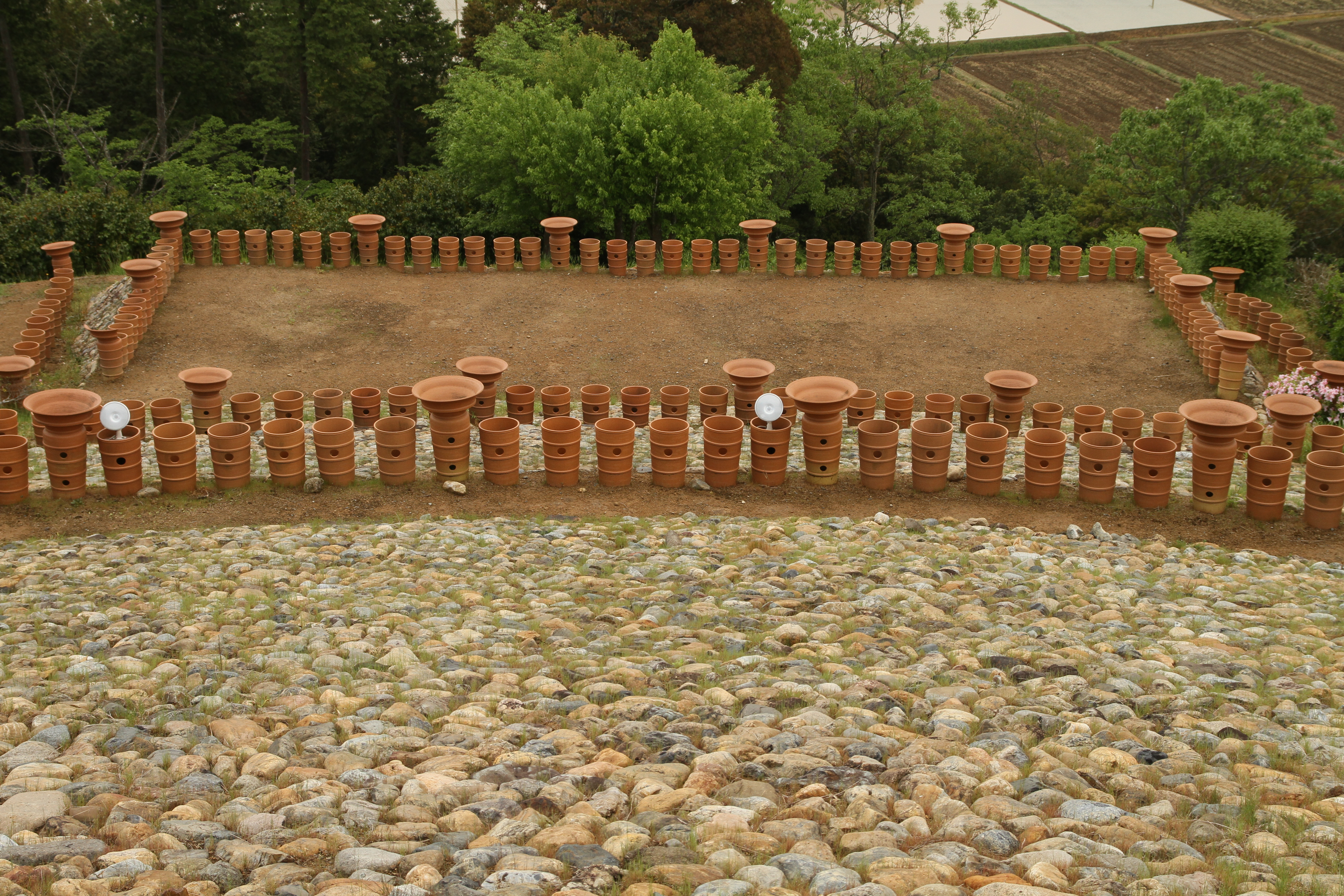
View from top of tumulus

== See also ==
- List of Historic Sites of Japan (Kyoto)
