= Kitakinki Tango Railway =

Railway operator in Japan

Kitakinki Tango Railway Corporation

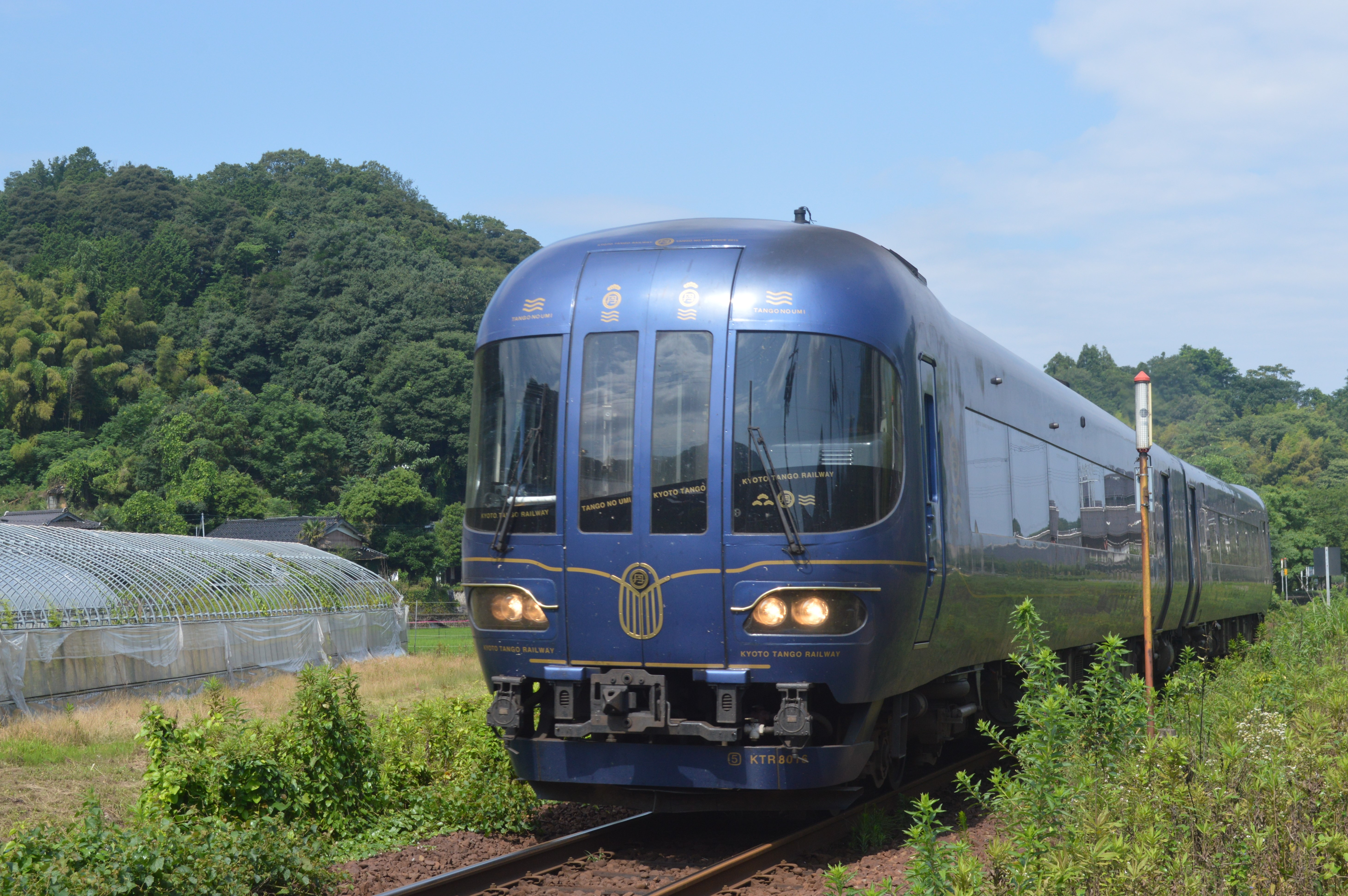
- KTR 8000 series DMU
- Native name: 北近畿タンゴ鉄道株式会社
- Romanized name: Kitakinki Tango Tetsudō Kabushiki-gaisha
- Company type: Public-private KK
- Founded: 1982
- Headquarters: Japan
- Website: ktr-tetsudo.jp

Kitakinki Tango Railway Corporation (北近畿タンゴ鉄道株式会社, Kitakinki Tango Tetsudō Kabushiki-gaisha) is a railway infrastructure company and a former railway operator in Japan. The company's name, which consists of "Kitakinki" meaning northern Kinki region and "Tango" meaning Tango Province, is occasionally abbreviated as KTR.

KTR was a so-called "third sector" company jointly funded by local governments and private entities. Its leading shareholder is the Kyoto Prefecture government with a 44.71% ownership. It headquarters in Fukuchiyama, Kyoto Prefecture.

In 2015, the company ceased to operate the trains on its own lines when Willer Trains Inc., under the brand name Kyoto Tango Railway, succeeded this function from KTR. KTR continues to own the tracks and rolling stock.

== Lines ==
KTR owns the following two regional railway lines:

- Miyafuku Line (in Kyoto Prefecture, 30.4 km)
- Miyazu Line (in Kyoto Prefecture and Hyōgo Prefecture, 83.6 km)

== History ==
In 1982, the company was incorporated as Miyafuku Railway Corporation (宮福鉄道株式会社, Miyafuku Tetsudō Kabushiki-gaisha) for the purpose of the construction and operation of the Miyafuku Line, the construction of which was suspended due to financial difficulties of the Japanese National Railways (JNR). The Miyafuku Line was completed in 1988. In the same year, local governments selected the company as the operator of the existing Miyazu Line, which was to be separated from West Japan Railway Company (JR West) in 1990.

Following the downturn in the business, investors including the Kyoto Prefecture government decided to introduce a new scheme of business, in which a separate company would operate trains on the tracks of KTR. Willer Group, being the only applicant for this proposal, was selected as the operator and later established Willer Trains Inc. The transfer of business took effect on April 1, 2015.

- 1982-09-22 – Incorporation as Miyafuku Railway Corporation
- 1982-12-24 – Issuance of railway business license of the Miyafuku Line
- 1988-06-22 – Shareholders' approval to the purchase of Miyazu Line business
- 1988-07-16 – Inauguration of the Miyafuku Line
- 1989-09-29 – Issuance of railway business license of the Miyazu Line
- 1989-08-01 – Change of corporate name to Kitakinki Tango Railway Corporation
- 1990-04-01 – Transfer of business of the Miyazu Line from JR West to KTR
- 1996-03-16 – Electrification of the entire Miyafuku Line and Miyazu–Amanohashidate segment of the Miyazu Line
- 2007-09-01 – Relocation of corporate headquarters from a prefecture government building in Kyoto to a JR West building in Fukuchiyama
- 2015-04-01 – Transfer of train operation function to Willer Trains
