= Futamata Station (Kyoto) =

Railway station in Fukuchiyama, Kyoto Prefecture, Japan

Futamata Station 二俣駅
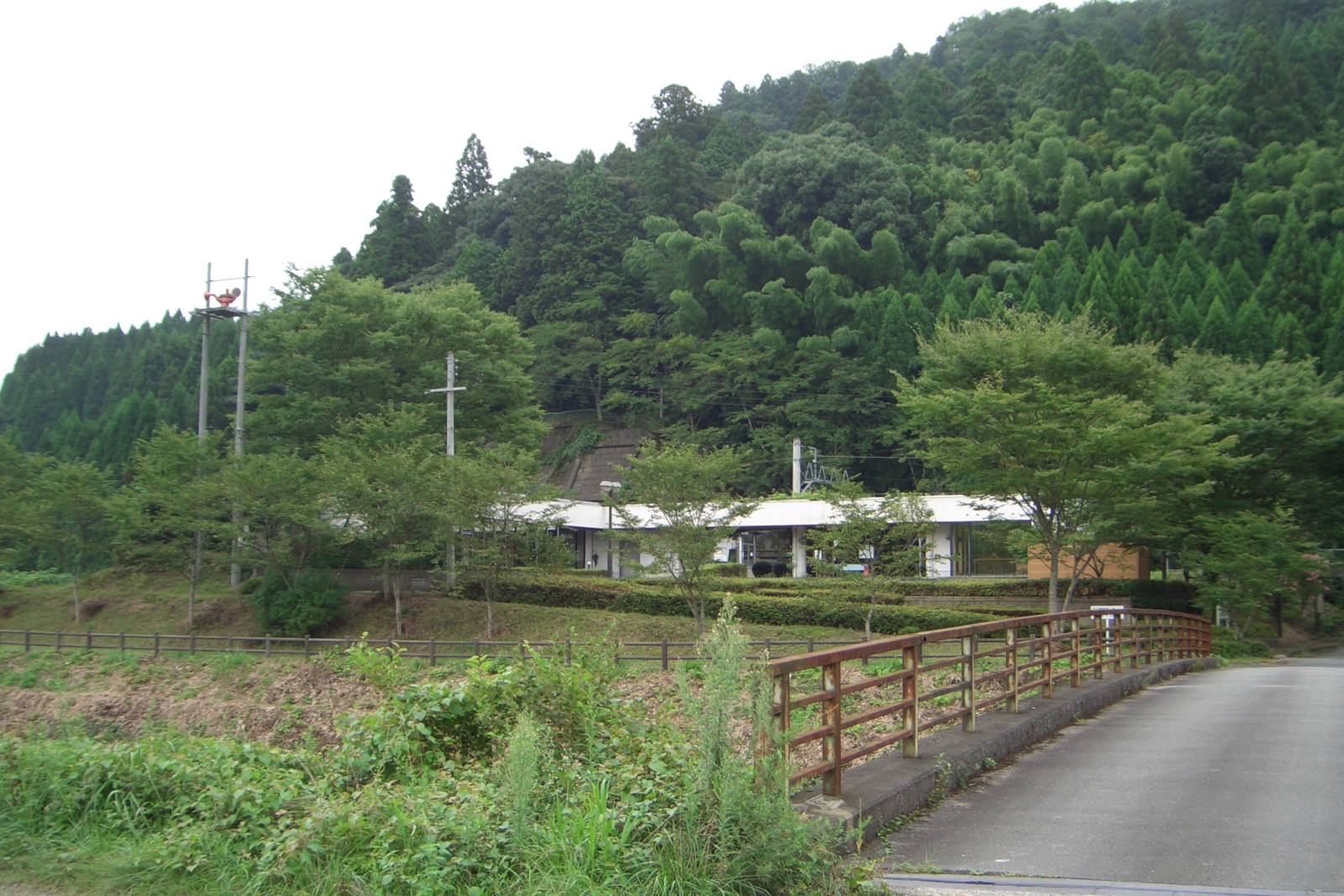
- Futamata Station, August 2009

General information
- Location: Oecho Futamata, Fukuchiyama-shi, Kyoto-fu 620-0324; Japan
- Coordinates: 35.4134°N 135.1543°E
- Operator: Kyoto Tango Railway
- Line: ■ Miyafuku Line
- Distance: 15.4 km from Fukuchiyama
- Platforms: 1 side platform
- Connections: Bus stop

Other information
- Status: Unstaffed
- Station code: F9
- Website: Official website

History
- Opened: 16 July 1988; 38 years ago

Passengers
- FY2018: 0 daily
Location
- Location within Kyoto Prefecture Location within Japan

Futamata Station (二俣駅, Futamata-eki) is a passenger railway station in located in the city of Fukuchiyama, Kyoto Prefecture, Japan, operated by the private railway company Willer Trains (Kyoto Tango Railway).

== Lines ==
Futamata Station is a station of the Miyafuku Line, and is located 15.4 kilometers (9.6 mi) from the terminus of the line at Fukuchiyama Station.

== Station layout ==
The station consists of a single side platform serving one bi-directional track. The station is unattended. There is no station building except for a shelter on the platform.

== Adjacent stations ==
«	Service	»
Miyafuku Line
Ōe-kōkōmae	Local	Ōeyamaguchi-Naiku
Rapid: Does not stop at this station
Limited express "Hashidate", "Tango Relay": Does not stop at this station

== History ==
The station was opened on 16 July 1988.

== Passenger statistics ==
In fiscal 2018, the station was used by an average of 0 passengers daily.

== Surrounding area ==
- Sarutahiko Jinja

== See also ==
- List of railway stations in Japan
