= Fukuchiyama Sandan-ike Park Gymnasium =

Arena in Fukuchiyama, Kyoto, Japan

Coordinates: 35°18′46.9″N 135°08′09.1″E

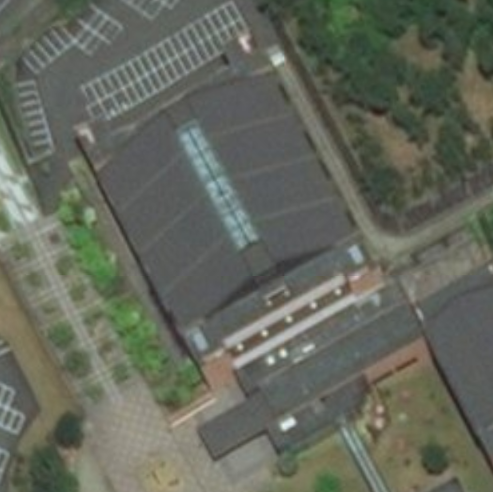
- Interactive map of Fukuchiyama Sandan-ike Park Gymnasium
- Full name: Fukuchiyama City Sandan-ike Park General Gymnasium
- Location: Fukuchiyama, Kyoto, Japan
- Owner: Fukuchiyama city
- Operator: Fukuchiyama city
- Parking: 1,200

Construction
- Cost

Website
- http://www.sandanike-kouen.or.jp/

Fukuchiyama Sandan-ike Park Gymnasium is an arena in Fukuchiyama, Kyoto, Japan.

== Facilities ==
- Main arena 49m x 39m
- Sub arena 31.93m x 22m
- Conference room
- Training room
