= Maki Station (Kyoto) =

Railway station in Fukuchiyama, Kyoto Prefecture, Japan

Maki Station 牧駅
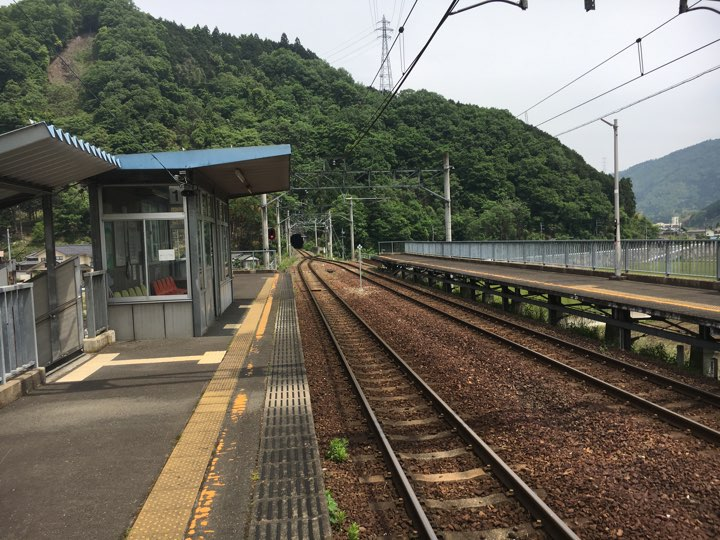
- Maki Station, May 2017

General information
- Location: Maki, Fukuchiyama-shi, Kyoto-fu 620-0000; Japan
- Coordinates: 35°20′17″N 135°06′06″E
- Operator: Kyoto Tango Railway
- Line: ■ Miyafuku Line
- Distance: 5.2 km from Fukuchiyama
- Platforms: 2 side platforms
- Connections: Bus stop

Other information
- Status: Unstaffed
- Station code: F4
- Website: Official website

History
- Opened: 16 July 1988; 38 years ago

Passengers
- FY2019: 14 daily
Location
- Location within Kyoto Prefecture Location within Japan

Maki Station (牧駅, Maki-eki) is a passenger railway station in located in the city of Fukuchiyama, Kyoto Prefecture, Japan, operated by the private railway company Willer Trains (Kyoto Tango Railway).

== Lines ==
Maki Station is a station of the Miyafuku Line, and is located 5.2 kilometers from the terminus of the line at Fukuchiyama Station.

== Station layout ==
The station consists of two opposed side platforms on an embankment. The station is unattended. The use of wye switches charges passing trains the speed limit of 40 km/h. There is no station building except for shelters on the platforms.

== Adjacent stations ==
«	Service	»
Miyafuku Line
Aragakashinokidai	Local (including Tango Aomatsu 3, 4)	Shimo-Amazu
Aragakashinokidai	Rapid Ōeyama	Shimo-Amazu (Ōeyama 2, 3, 7); Ōe (Ōeyama 1, 4, 5, 6)
Aragakashinokidai	Rapid Tango Aomatsu 2	Ōe
Rapid Tango Aomatsu 1: Does not stop at this station
Limited express Hashidate, Tango Relay: Does not stop at this station

== History ==
The station was opened on 16 July 1988.

== Passenger statistics ==
In fiscal 2018, the station was used by an average of 14 passengers daily.

== Surrounding area ==
- Japan National Route 9
- Japan National Route 175
- Yura River

== See also ==
- List of railway stations in Japan
