= Takatsu Station (Kyoto) =

Railway station in Ayabe, Kyoto Prefecture, Japan

Takatsu Station 高津駅
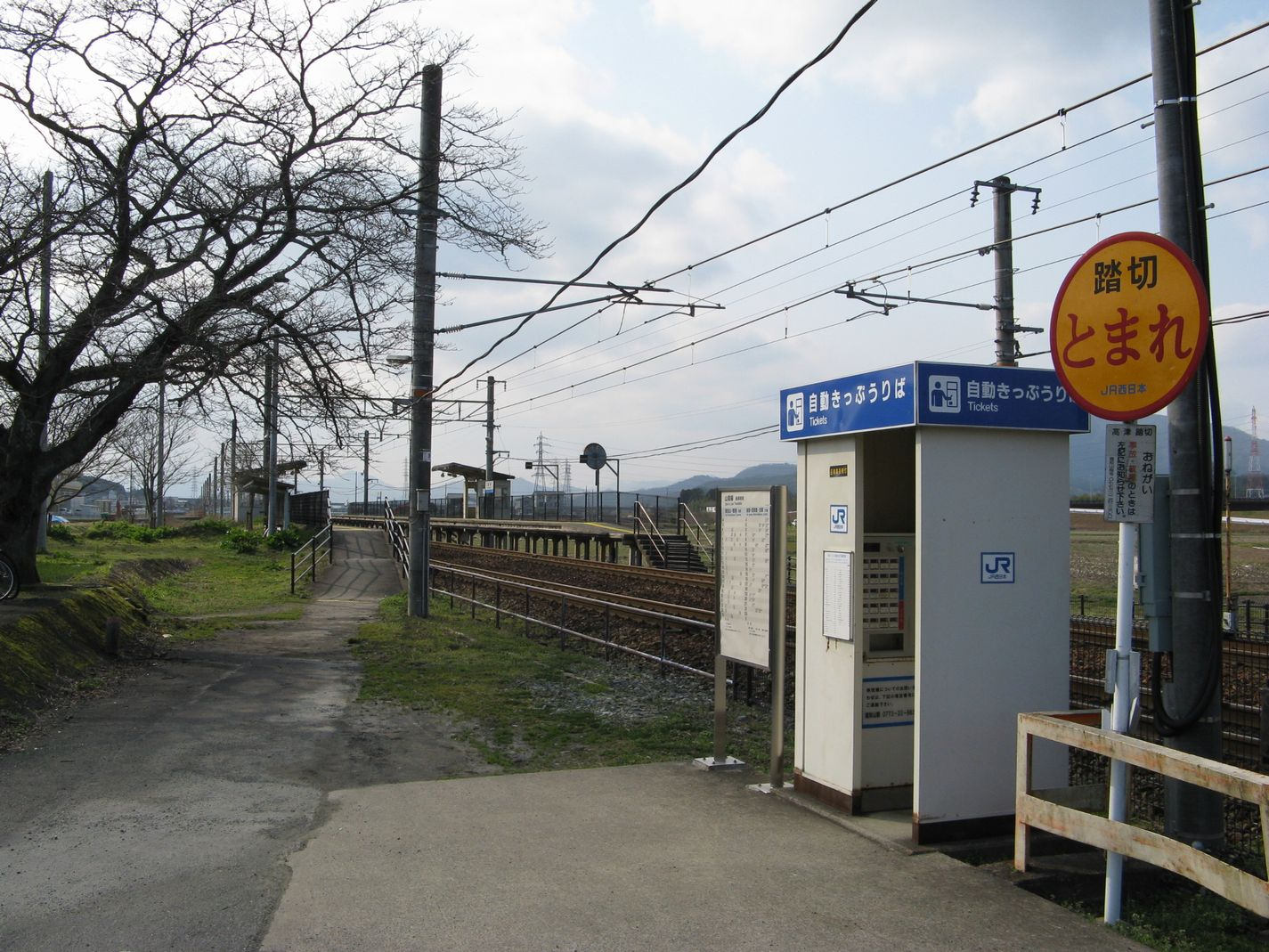
- Takatsu Station in 2009

General information
- Location: Takadoi Takatsucho, Ayabe-shi, Kyoto-fu 623-0045; Japan
- Coordinates: 35°18′18″N 135°12′28″E
- Owner: West Japan Railway Company
- Operator: West Japan Railway Company
- Line: San'in Main Line
- Distance: 80.3 km (49.9 miles) from Kyoto
- Platforms: 2 side platforms
- Connections: Bus stop

Construction
- Structure type: Ground level

Other information
- Status: Unstaffed
- Website: Official website

History
- Opened: 12 February 1958

Passengers
- FY 2023: 184 daily

Services
Preceding station	JR West	Following station
Isa towards Kinosaki-Onsen	San'in Line	Ayabe towards Kyoto
Location
- Location within Kyoto Prefecture Location within Japan

Takatsu Station (高津駅, Takatsu-eki) is a passenger railway station located in the city of Ayabe, Kyoto Prefecture, Japan, operated by West Japan Railway Company (JR West).

== Lines ==
Takasu Station is served by the San'in Main Line, and is located 80.3 kilometers from the terminus of the line at Kyoto.

== Station layout ==
The station consists of two opposed side platforms connected by a level crossing. There is no station building and the station is unattended.

=== Platforms ===
1	■ San'in Main Line	for Ayabe and Kyoto
2	■ San'in Main Line	for Fukuchiyama and Toyooka

== Adjacent stations ==
«	Service	»
West Japan Railway Company (JR West) Sanin Main Line
Limited Express Hamakaze: Does not stop at this station
Ayabe	Local (Including Rapid Service when running between Sonobe and Kyoto)	Isa

== History ==
Takasu Station opened on February 12, 1958. With the privatization of the Japan National Railways (JNR) on April 1, 1987, the station came under the aegis of the West Japan Railway Company.

== Passenger statistics ==
In fiscal 2016, the station was used by an average of 123 passengers daily.

== Surrounding area ==
- Kyoto Kyoritsu Hospital

== See also ==
- List of railway stations in Japan
