= Gujō Station =

Railway station in Fukuchiyama, Kyoto Prefecture, Japan

Gujō Station 公庄駅
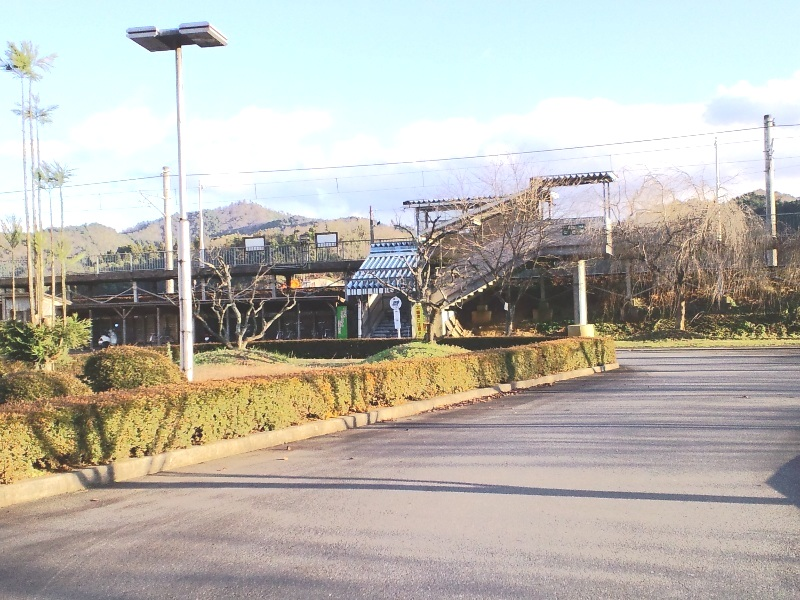
- Gujō Station, December 2012

General information
- Location: Oecho Gujo, Fukuchiyama-shi, Kyoto-fu 620-0312; Japan
- Coordinates: 35.3716°N 135.1289°E
- Operator: Kyoto Tango Railway
- Line: ■ Miyafuku Line
- Distance: 10.0 km from Fukuchiyama
- Platforms: 1 side platform
- Connections: Bus stop

Other information
- Status: Unstaffed
- Station code: F6
- Website: Official website

History
- Opened: 16 July 1988; 38 years ago

Passengers
- FY2018: 0 daily
Location
- Location within Kyoto Prefecture Location within Japan

Gujō Station (公庄駅, Gujō-eki) is a passenger railway station in located in the city of Fukuchiyama, Kyoto Prefecture, Japan, operated by the private railway company Willer Trains (Kyoto Tango Railway).

== Lines ==
Gujō Station is a station of the Miyafuku Line, and is located 10.0 kilometers (6.2 mi) from the terminus of the line at Fukuchiyama Station.

== Station layout ==
The station consists of oneside platform on an embankment, serving a single bi-directional track. The station is unattended. There is no station building except for a shelter on the platform.

== Adjacent stations ==
«	Service	»
Miyafuku Line
Shimo-Amazu	Local (including Tango Aomatsu 3, 4)	Ōe
Shimo-Amazu	Rapid Ōeyama 2, 3, 7	Ōe
Rapid Ōeyama 1, 4, 5, 6: Does not stop at this station
Rapid Tango Aomatsu 1, 2: Does not stop at this station
Limited express Hashidate, Tango Relay: Does not stop at this station

== History ==
The station was opened on 16 July 1988.

== Passenger statistics ==
In fiscal 2018, the station was used by an average of 0 passengers daily.

== Surrounding area ==
- Japan National Route 175 runs a little west from the station. The Yura River flows slightly east of the station.

== See also ==
- List of railway stations in Japan
