= 石原駅 =

石原駅 is the name of multiple train stations in Japan:

- Isa Station
- Ishiwara Station
