= Fukuchiyama Domain =

Japanese feudal domain located in Tanba Province

Fukuchiyama Domain 福知山藩
- under Tokugawa shogunate Japan
- 1600–1871
- Capital: Fukuchiyama Castle
- Area
  - Coordinates: 35°17′48.5″N 135°7′46.8″E
- Government
  - Type: Daimyō
- Historical era: Edo period
  - Established: 1600
  - Arima clan: 1600
  - Okabe clan: 1621
  - Inaba clan: 1624
  - Fukōzu Matsudaira clan: 1649
  - Kutsuki clan: 1669
  - Disestablished: 1871
- Today part of: part of Kyoto Prefecture

Location of Fukuchiyama Castle
Fukuchiyama Domain (Japan)

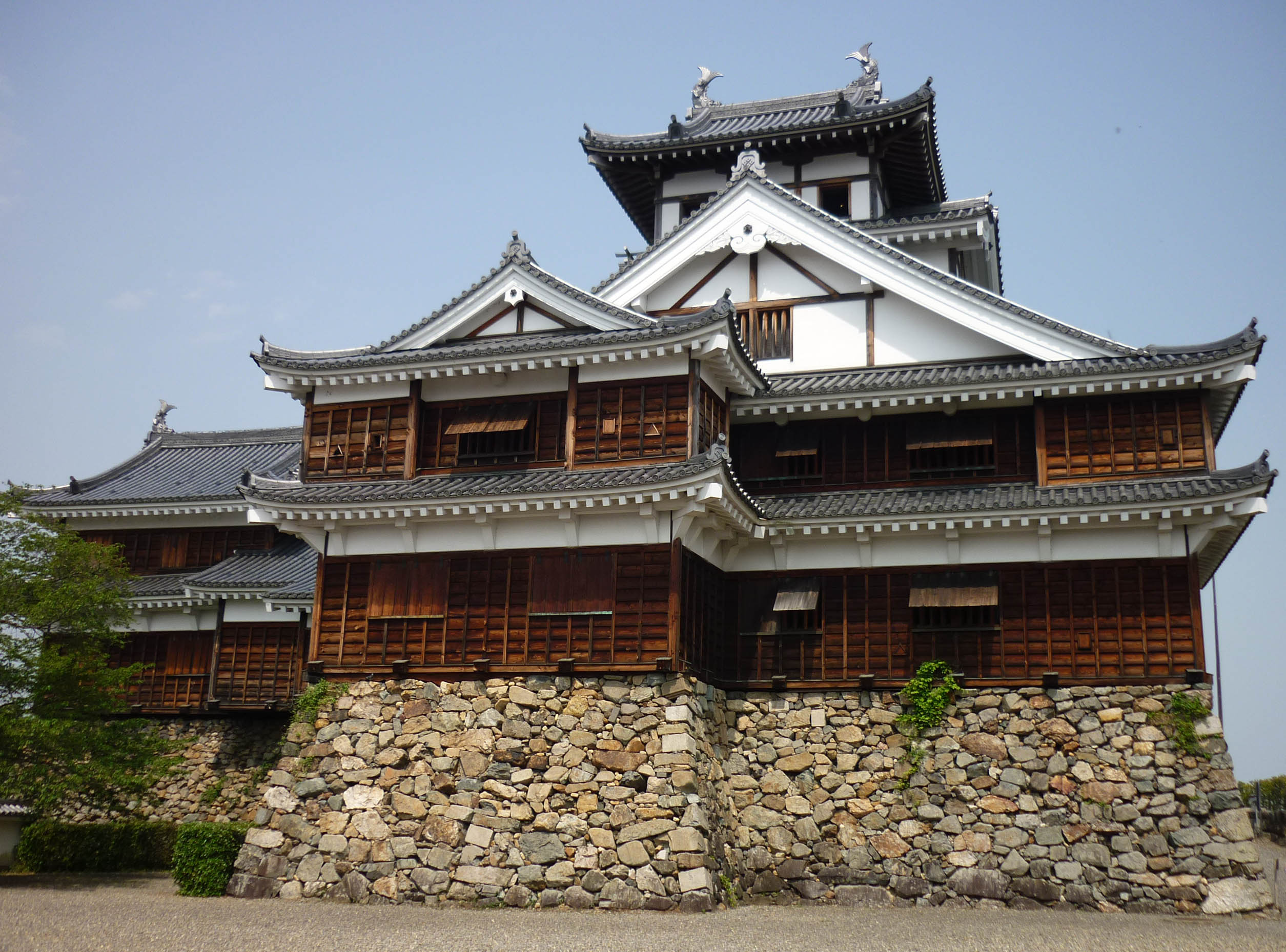
Fukuchiyama Castle

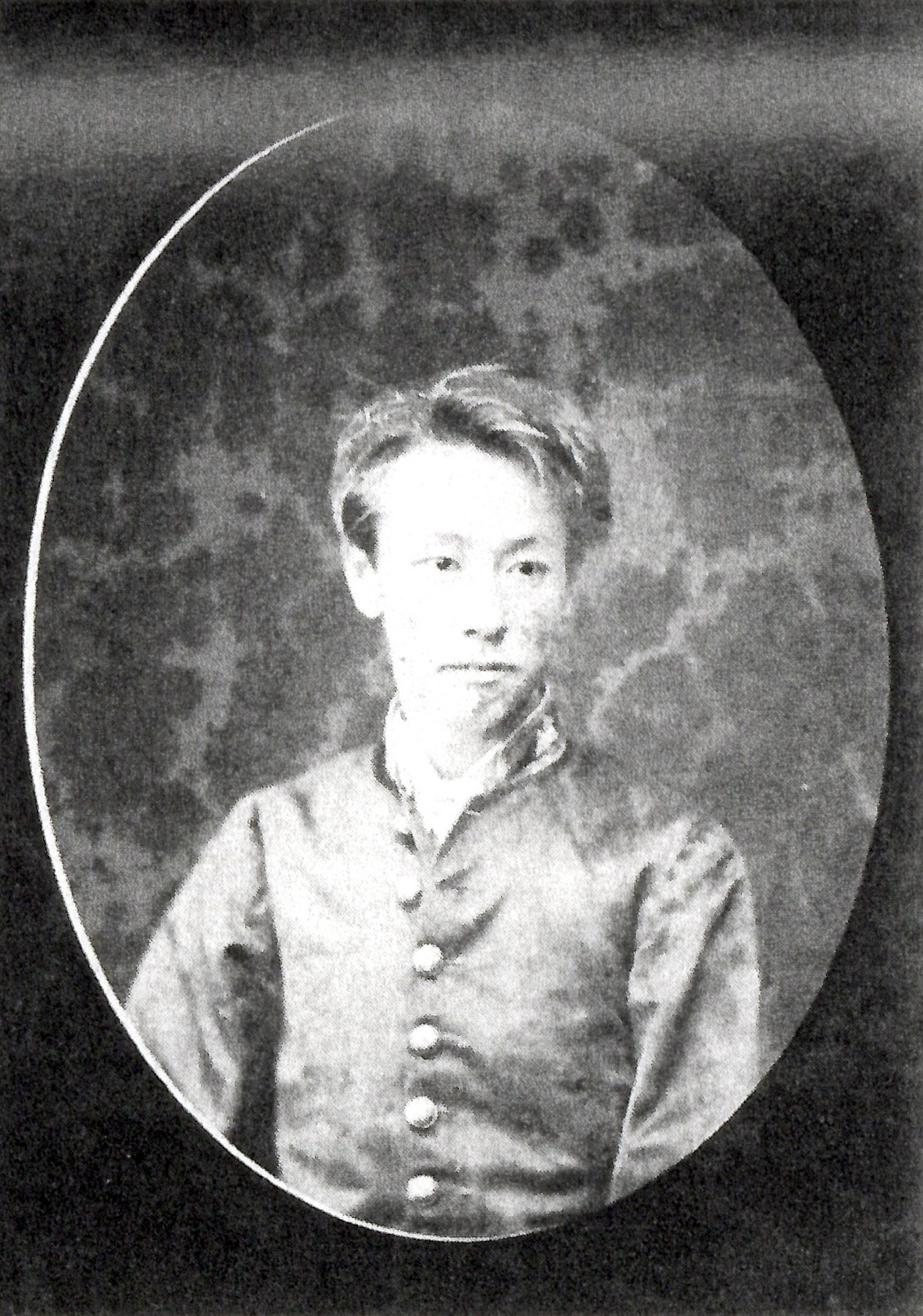
Kutsuki Moritsuna, final daimyō of Fukuchiyama

Fukuchiyama Domain (福知山藩, Fukuchiyama-han) was a feudal domain under the Tokugawa shogunate of Edo period Japan, located in Tanba Province in what is now the west-central portion of modern-day Kyoto Prefecture. It was centered initially around Fukuchiyama Castle in what is now the city of Fukuchiyama, Kyoto.

== History ==
In 1579, Oda Nobunaga granted Tanba Province in its entirety to Akechi Mitsuhide. Mitsuhide entrusted the Fukuchiyama region to his brother-in-law Akechi Hidemitsu. When Mitsuhide rebelled against Nobunaga in the Honnō-ji Incident in 1582, Hidemitsu served in the vanguard of the Akechi armies, and after Mitsuhide's defeat at the Battle of Yamazaki, he famously crossed Lake Biwa to Sakamoto Castle, where he committed suicide with Mitsuhide's widow and children. Afterwards, Toyotomi Hideyoshi awarded the Fukuchiyama area to his generals Sugihara Ieji and Onogi Shigeuji, both of whom were subsequently killed in 1600 at the Siege of Tanabe fighting for the Western Army. Following his victory at the Battle of Sekigahara, Tokugawa Ieyasu granted Fukuchiyama to Arima Toyouji, who was transferred from Yokosuka in Mikawa Province to become daimyō of the new 60,000 koku Fukuchiyama Domain under the Tokugawa Shogunate. When his father died in 1602, he inherited an additional 20,000 koku, raising the domain to a kokudaka of 80,000 koku. He constructed Fukuchiyama Castle and the castle town, conducted a land survey, and set the foundations for the domain. However, after his transfer to Kurume Domain in 1620, the domain passed through a number of clans in rapid succession. In August 1621, Okabe Nagamori was transferred from Tanba-Kameyama Domain, but was transferred to Ogaki Domain in Mino Province in September 1624. He was replaced by Inaba Norimichi from Nakajima Domain in Settsu Province, but due to bad government and paranoia against Kyōgoku Takahiro of Miyazu Domain in neighboring Tango Province, he raised an army of 1500 troops and planned to invade. The shogunate quickly intervened and Inaba, cornered in Fukuchiyama Castle, shot himself in the head with a gun in 1648. In 1649, Matsudaira Tadafusa was transferred from Kariya Domain in Mikawa Province. He was noted for performing a new land survey, which continued to be used into the Meiji period. He was transferred to Shimabara Domain in 1669, and was replaced by Kutsuki Tanemasa from Tsuchiura Domain in Hitachi Province. The Kutsuki clan would continue to rule Fukuchiyama until the Meiji restoration, although the domain's finances were always precarious, especially after the Kyōhō famine of 1732–1733. Peasant uprisings were frequent occurrences. Among the successive daimyō, Kutsuki Nobutsuna and Kutsuki Masatsuna were noted as literati, and promoted rangaku studies. the 9th daimyō, Kutsuki Tomotsuna, promoted fiscal and financial reforms. During the Bakumatsu period, the final daimyō, Kutsuki Moritsuna, surrendered to imperial forces after the defeat of the pro-Tokugawa army at the Battle of Toba-Fushimi. Following the abolition of the han system in 1871, he relocated to Tokyo, and devoted the remainder of his life to providing relief measures for his former samurai retainers. His son, Viscount Kutsuki Tsunasada, was a major general in the Imperial Japanese Army, politician, and noted researcher of gunpowder.

Fukuchiyama Domain became "Fukuchiyama Prefecture" in 1871, and was merged into "Toyooka Prefecture". It was transferred to Kyoto Prefecture in 1876.

== Holdings at the end of the Edo period ==
As with most domains in the han system, Fukuchiyama Domain consisted of several discontinuous territories calculated to provide the assigned kokudaka, based on periodic cadastral surveys and projected agricultural yields.

- Tanba Province
  - 62 villages in Amata District
- Ōmi Province
  - 4 villages in Takashima District
  - 10 villages in Soma District

== List of daimyō ==
#	Name	Tenure	Courtesy title	Court Rank	kokudaka
Arima clan, 1600–1620 (tozama)
1	ArimaToyouji (有馬豊氏)	1600–1620	Genba-no-kami (玄蕃頭); Jijū (侍従)	Junior 4th Rank, Lower Grade (従四位下)	60,000 -> 80,000 koku
tenryō 1620–1621
Okabe clan, 1621–1624 (fudai)
1	Okabe Nagamori (岡部長盛)	1621–1624	Naizen-no-kami (内膳正)	Junior 5th Rank, Lower Grade (従五位下)	50,000 koku
Inaba clan, 1624–1648 (tozama)
1	Inaba Norimichi (稲葉紀通)	1624–1648	Awaji-no-kami (淡路守)	Junior 5th Rank, Lower Grade (従五位下)	45,700 koku
tenryō 1648–1649
Fukōzu Matsudaira clan, 1649–1669 (fudai)
1	Matsudaira Tadafusa (松平忠房)	1649–1669	Tomoro-no-kami (主殿頭 )	Junior 5th Rank, Lower Grade (従五位下)	45,900 koku
Kutsuki clan, 1669–1871 (fudai)
1	Kutsuki Tanemasa (朽木稙昌)	1669–1708	Iyo-no-kami (伊予守 )	Junior 5th Rank, Lower Grade (従五位下)	32,000 koku
2	Kutsuki Tanemoto (朽木稙元)	1708–1721	Minbu-taifu (民部大輔 )	Junior 5th Rank, Lower Grade (従五位下)	32,000 koku
3	Kutsuki Tanetsuna (朽木稙綱)	1721–1726	Iyo-no-kami (伊予守 )	Junior 5th Rank, Lower Grade (従五位下)	32,000 koku
4	Kutsuki Taneharu (朽木稙治)	1726–1728	Tosa-no-kami (土佐守)	Junior 5th Rank, Lower Grade (従五位下)	32,000 koku
5	Kutsuki Tanetsuna (朽木玄綱)	1728–1770	Tosa-no-kami (土佐守)	Junior 5th Rank, Lower Grade (従五位下)	32,000 koku
6	Kutsuki Tanesada (朽木綱貞)	1770–1780	Ōi-no-kami (大炊頭)	Junior 5th Rank, Lower Grade (従五位下)	32,000 koku
7	Kutsuki Nobutsuna (朽木舖綱)	1780–1787	Iyo-no-kami (伊予守)	Junior 5th Rank, Lower Grade (従五位下)	32,000 koku
8	Kutsuki Masatsuna (朽木昌綱)	1787–1800	Ōmi-no-kami (近江守)	Junior 5th Rank, Lower Grade (従五位下)	32,000 koku
9	Kutsuki Tomotsuna (朽木倫綱)	1800–1802	Tosa-no-kami (土佐守)	Junior 5th Rank, Lower Grade (従五位下)	32,000 koku
10	Kutsuki Tsunakata (朽木綱方)	1803–1821	Tosa-no-kami (土佐守)	Junior 5th Rank, Lower Grade (従五位下)	32,000 koku
11	Kutsuki Tsunaeda (朽木綱条)	1821–1836	Oki-no-kami (隠岐守)	Junior 5th Rank, Lower Grade (従五位下)	32,000 koku
12	Kutsuki Tsunaharu (朽木綱張)	1836–1867	Ōmi-no-kami (近江守)	Junior 5th Rank, Lower Grade (従五位下)	32,000 koku
13	Kutsuki Moritsuna (朽木為綱)	1867–1871	Ōmi-no-kami (近江守)	Junior 5th Rank, Lower Grade (従五位下)	32,000 koku

== See also ==
- List of Han
- Abolition of the han system
