= Ōe-Kōkōmae Station =

Railway station in Fukuchiyama, Kyoto Prefecture, Japan

Ōe-Kōkōmae Station 大江高校前駅
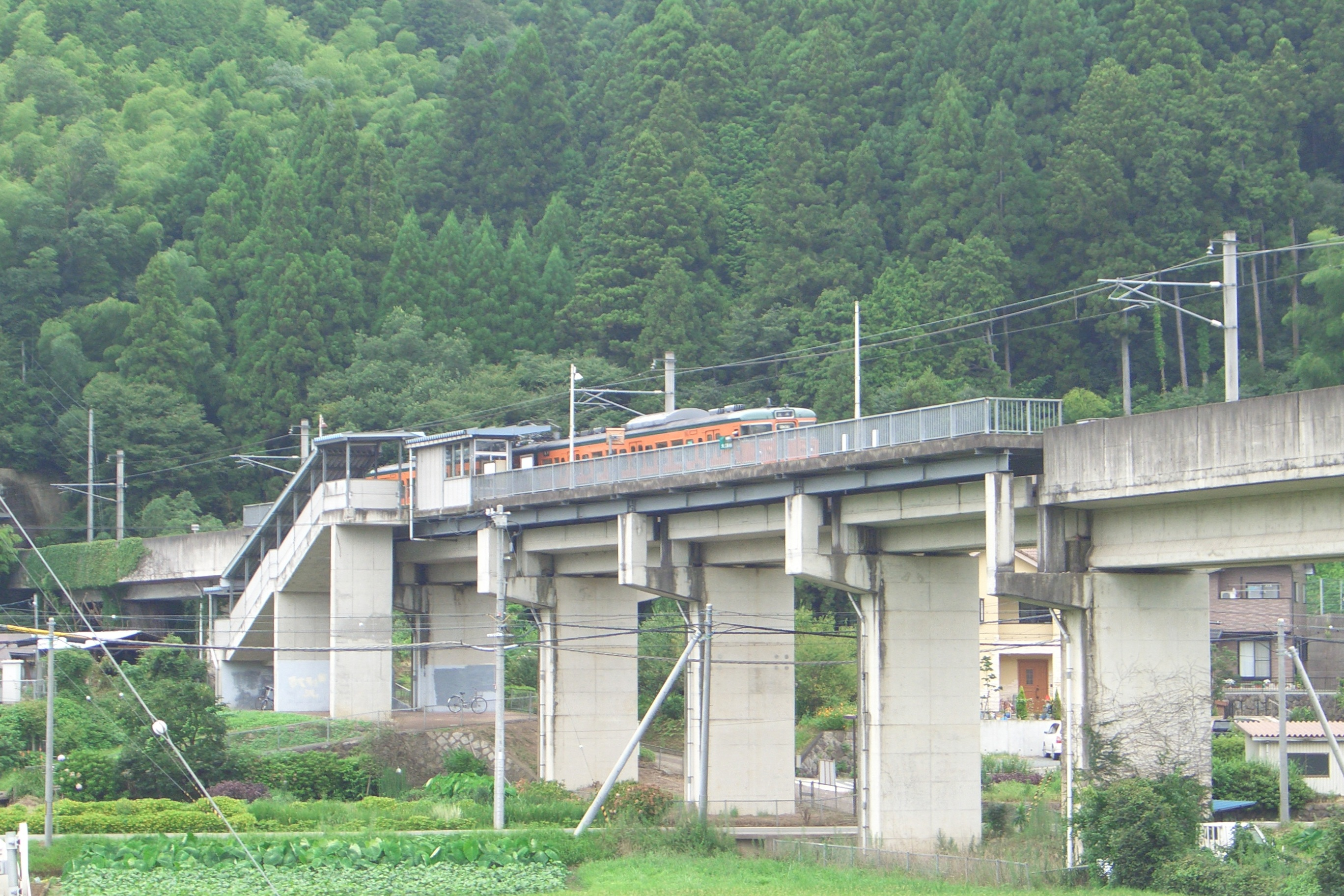
- Araga-Kashinokidai Station, August 2009

General information
- Location: Oe-cho Kanaya, Fukuchiyama-shi, Kyoto-fu 620-0303; Japan
- Coordinates: 35°23′43″N 135°09′09″E
- Operator: Kyoto Tango Railway
- Line: ■ Miyafuku Line
- Distance: 13.4 km from Fukuchiyama
- Platforms: 1 side platform
- Connections: Bus stop

Other information
- Status: Unstaffed
- Station code: F8
- Website: Official website

History
- Opened: 16 July 1988; 38 years ago

Passengers
- FY2018: 167 daily
Location
- Location within Kyoto Prefecture Location within Japan

Ōe-kōkōmae Station (大江高校前駅, Ōe-kōkōmae-eki) is a passenger railway station in located in the city of Fukuchiyama, Kyoto Prefecture, Japan, operated by the private railway company Willer Trains (Kyoto Tango Railway).

== Lines ==
Ōe-kōkōmae Station is a station of the Miyafuku Line, and is located 13.4 kilometers (8.3 mi) from the terminus of the line at Fukuchiyama Station.

== Station layout ==
The station consists of one elevated side platform serving a single bi-directional track. The station is unattended. There is no station building except for shelter on the platform.

== Adjacent stations ==
«	Service	»
Miyafuku Line
Ōe	Local (including "Tango Aomatsu" 3, 4)	Futamata
Ōe	Rapid "Ōeyama" 1, 2, 3	Ōeyamaguchi-Naiku
Rapid "Tango Aomatsu" 1, 2: Does not stop at this station
Limited express "Hashidate", "Tango Relay": Does not stop at this station

== History ==
The station was opened on 16 July 1988.

== Passenger statistics ==
In fiscal 2018, the station was used by an average of 167 passengers daily.

== Surrounding area ==
- Kyoto Prefectural Oe High School
- Fukuchiyama Municipal Oe Junior High School

== See also ==
- List of railway stations in Japan
