= Ōeyamaguchi-Naiku Station =

Railway station in Fukuchiyama, Kyoto Prefecture, Japan

Ōeyamaguchi-naiku Station 大江山口内宮駅
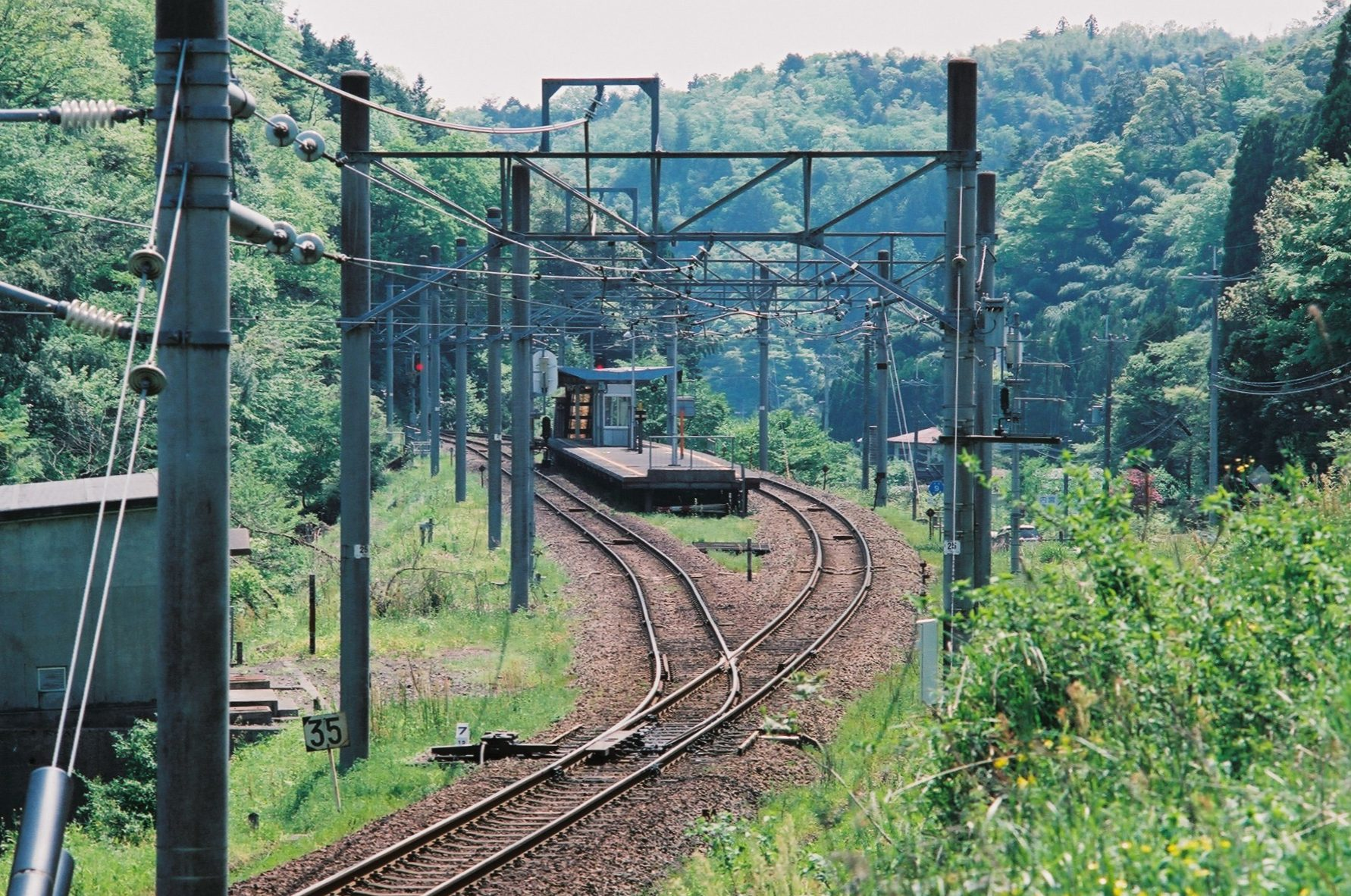
- Ōeyamaguchi-naiku Station, May 2008

General information
- Location: Ōecho, Naiku ,Fukuchiyama-shi, Kyoto-fu 620-0323; Japan
- Coordinates: 35°25′56″N 135°09′30″E
- Operator: Kyoto Tango Railway
- Line: ■ Miyafuku Line
- Distance: 17.6 km from Fukuchiyama
- Platforms: 1 island platform
- Connections: Bus stop

Other information
- Status: Unstaffed
- Station code: F10
- Website: Official website

History
- Opened: 16 July 1988; 38 years ago

Passengers
- FY2019: 8 daily
Location
- Location within Kyoto Prefecture Location within Japan

Ōeyamaguchi-naiku Station (大江山口内宮駅, Ōeyamaguchi-naiku-eki) is a passenger railway station in located in the city of Fukuchiyama, Kyoto Prefecture, Japan, operated by the private railway company Willer Trains (Kyoto Tango Railway).

== Lines ==
Ōeyamaguchi-naiku i Station is a station of the Miyafuku Line, and is located 17.6 kilometers (10.9 mi) from the terminus of the line at Fukuchiyama Station.

== Station layout ==
The station consists of one group level island platform, connected to the road by a level crossing. The station is unattended. There is no station building except for a shelter on the platform.

== Adjacent stations ==
«	Service	»
Miyafuku Line
Futamata	Local (including "Tango Aomatsu" 3, 4)	Karakawa
Ōe ("Ōeyama" 4, 5, 6, 7); Ōe-Kōkōmae ("Ōeyama" 1, 2, 3)	Rapid "Ōeyama"	Karakawa ("Ōeyama" 2); Kita ("Ōeyama" 3); Miyamura ("Ōeyama" 1, 4, 5, 6, 7)
Ōe	Rapid "Tango Aomatsu" 2	Miyamura
Limited express "Hashidate", "Tango Relay": Does not stop at this station

== History ==
The station was opened on 16 July 1988.

== Passenger statistics ==
In fiscal 2018, the station was used by an average of 8 passengers daily.

== Surrounding area ==
- Kotai-Jinja

== See also ==
- List of railway stations in Japan
