= Fukuchiyama-shimin-byōin-guchi Station =

Railway station in Fukuchiyama, Kyoto Prefecture, Japan

Fukuchiyama-shimin-byōin-guchi Station 福知山市民病院口駅
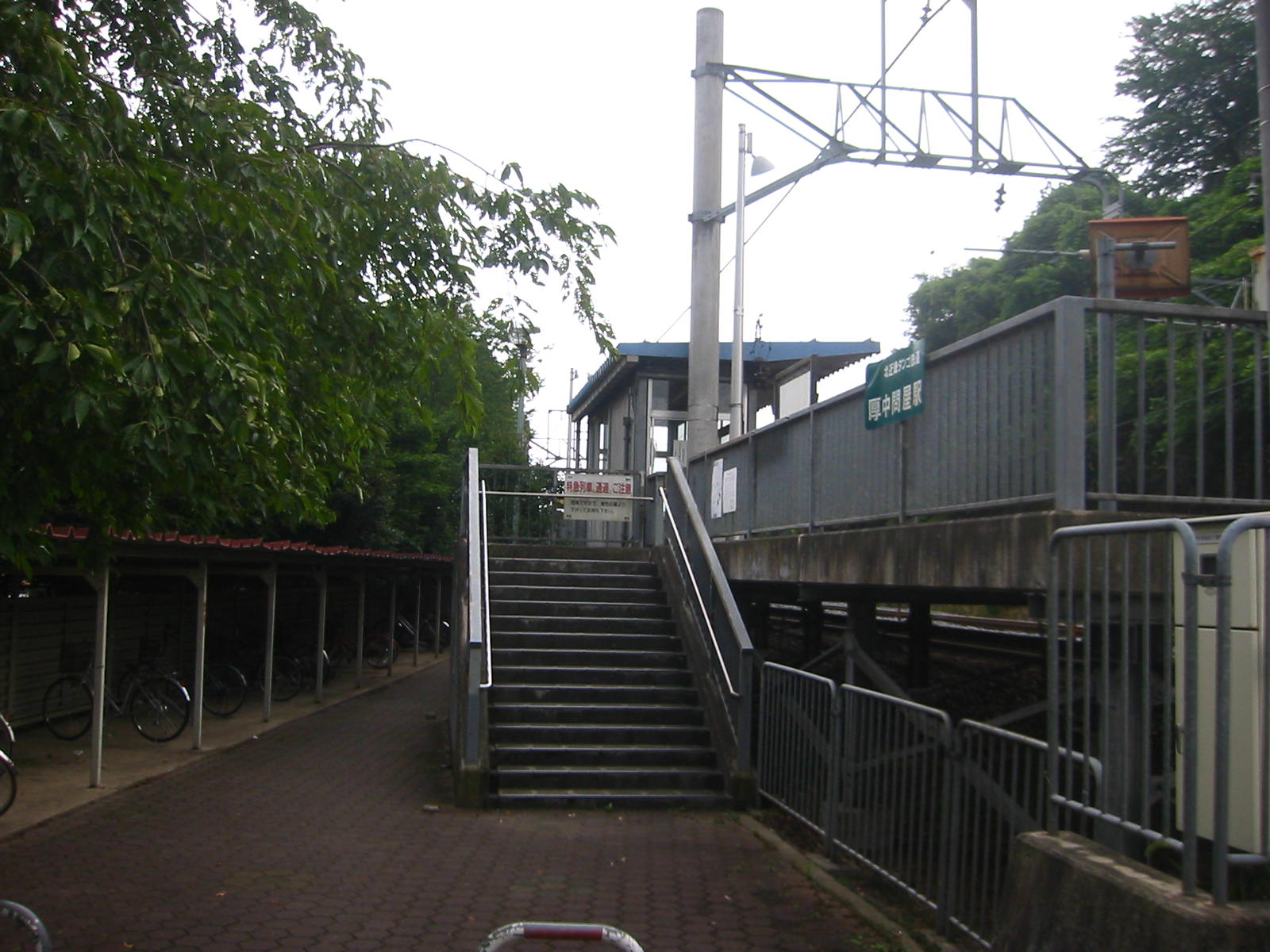
- Station exit in 2006

General information
- Location: 75 Atsunakaton'ya-chō, Fukuchiyama-shi, Kyoto-fu 620-0058; Japan
- Coordinates: 35.3064°N 135.1084°E
- Operator: Kyoto Tango Railway
- Line: ■ Miyafuku Line
- Distance: 1.5 km from Fukuchiyama
- Platforms: 1 side platform
- Connections: Bus stop

Other information
- Status: Unstaffed
- Station code: F2
- Website: Official website

History
- Opened: 16 July 1988; 38 years ago
- Former names: Atsunakatonya (until 2015)

Passengers
- FY2019: 39 daily
Location
- Location within Kyoto Prefecture Location within Japan

Fukuchiyama-shimin-byōin-guchi Station (福知山市民病院口駅, Fukuchiyama-shimin-byōin-guchi-eki) is a passenger railway station in located in the city of Fukuchiyama, Kyoto Prefecture, Japan, operated by the private railway company Willer Trains (Kyoto Tango Railway).

== Lines ==
Fukuchiyama-shimin-byōin-guchi Station is a station of the Miyafuku Line, and is located 1.5 kilometers (0.93 mi) from the terminus of the line at Fukuchiyama Station.

== Station layout ==
The station consists of one side platform serving a single bi-directional track. The station is unattended. There is no station building except for a shelter on the platform. Next to the Miyafuku Line track, a track of the Sanin Main Line exists with no platform.

== Adjacent stations ==
«	Service	»
Miyafuku Line
Fukuchiyama	Local (including Tango Aomatsu 3, 4)	Aragakashinokidai
Fukuchiyama	Rapid Ōeyama 1, 2, 3, 7	Aragakashinokidai
Rapid Ōeyama 4, 5, 6: Does not stop at this station
Rapid Tango Aomatsu 1, 2: Does not stop at this station
Limited express Hashidate, Tango Relay: Does not stop at this station

== History ==
The station was opened on 16 July 1988 as Atsunakatonya Station (厚中問屋駅, Atsunakaton'ya-eki) and was renamed to the present name on April 1, 2015.

== Passenger statistics ==
In fiscal 2018, the station was used by an average of 39 passengers daily.

== Surrounding area ==
- Municipal Fukuchiyama Municipal Hospital
- Fukuchiyama Municipal Seiwa Junior High School

== See also ==
- List of railway stations in Japan
