= Kamikawaguchi Station =

Railway station in Fukuchiyama, Kyoto Prefecture, Japan

Kamikawaguchi Station 上川口駅
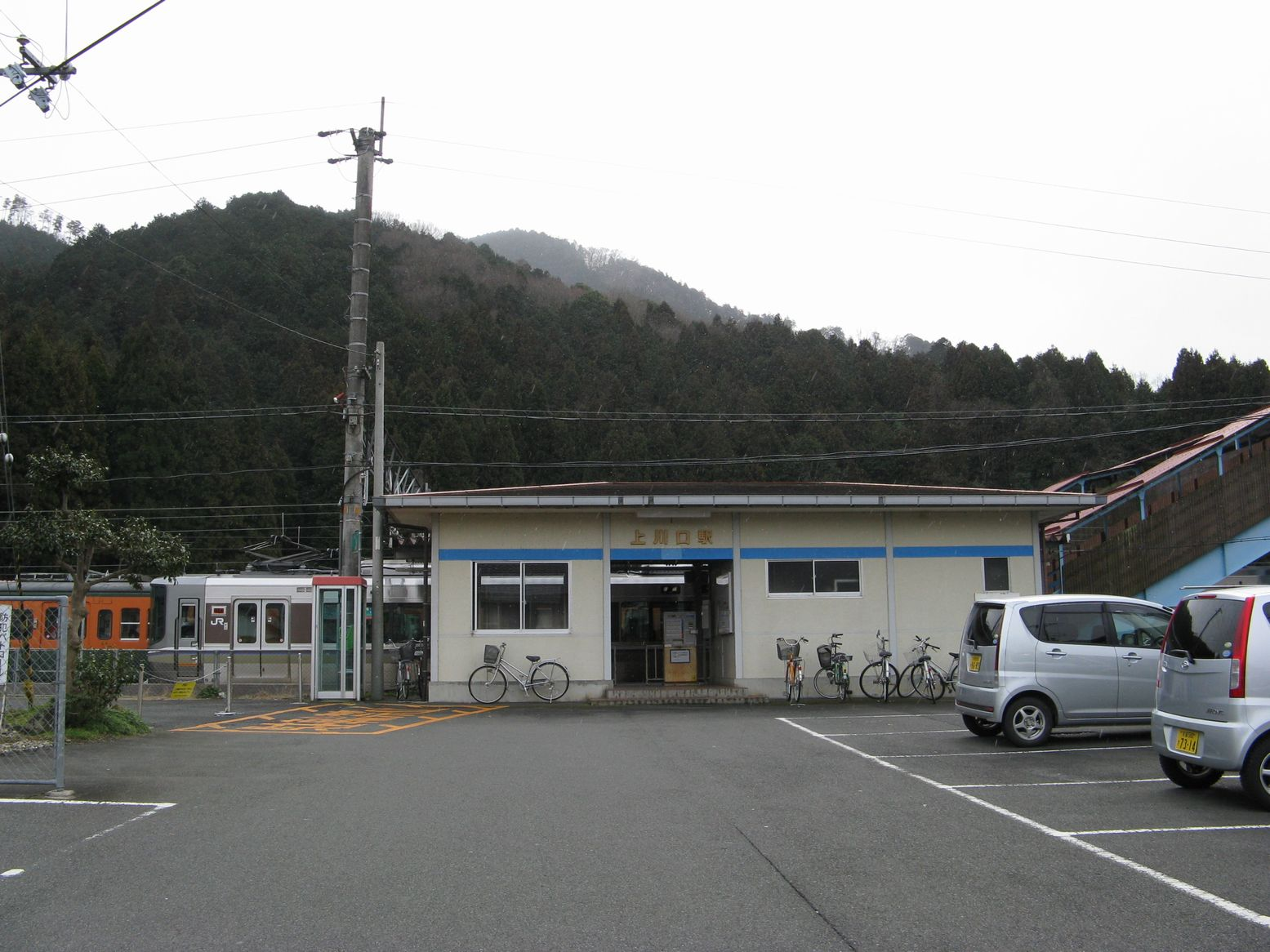
- Kamikawaguchi Station, 2009

General information
- Location: Yakunocho Hirano, Fukuchiyama-shi, Kyoto-fu 629-1322; Japan
- Coordinates: 35°19′46″N 135°04′24″E
- Owner: West Japan Railway Company
- Operator: West Japan Railway Company
- Line: San'in Main Line
- Distance: 95.2 km (59.2 miles) from Kyoto
- Platforms: 1 island + 1 side platform
- Connections: Bus stop

Construction
- Structure type: Ground level

Other information
- Status: Unstaffed
- Website: Official website

History
- Opened: 25 October 1911

Passengers
- FY 2023: 72 daily
Location
- Location within Kyoto Prefecture Location within Japan

Kamikawaguchi Station (上川口駅, Kamikawaguchi-eki) is a passenger railway station located in the city of Fukuchiyama, Kyoto Prefecture, Japan, operated by West Japan Railway Company (JR West).

== Lines ==
Kamikawaguchi Station is served by the San'in Main Line, and is located 95.2 kilometers from the terminus of the line at Kyoto.

== Station layout ==
The station consists of one ground-level island platform and one ground-level side platform connected to the station building by a footbridge. The station is unattended.

=== Platforms ===
1	■ San'in Main Line	for Fukuchiyama, Kyoto and Osaka
2, 3	■ San'in Main Line	for Wadayama and Toyooka

== Adjacent stations ==
«	Service	»
West Japan Railway Company (JR West) San'in Main Line
Limited Express Hamakaze: Does not stop at this station
Fukuchiyama	-	Shimo-Yakuno

== History ==
Kamikawaguchi Station opened on October 25, 1911. With the privatization of the Japan National Railways (JNR) on April 1, 1987, the station came under the aegis of the West Japan Railway Company.

== Passenger statistics ==
In fiscal 2016, the station was used by an average of 45 passengers daily

== Surrounding area ==
- Japan National Route 9

== See also ==
- List of railway stations in Japan
