= Aragakashinokidai Station =

Railway station in Fukuchiyama, Kyoto Prefecture, Japan

Araga-Kashinokidai Station 荒河かしの木台駅
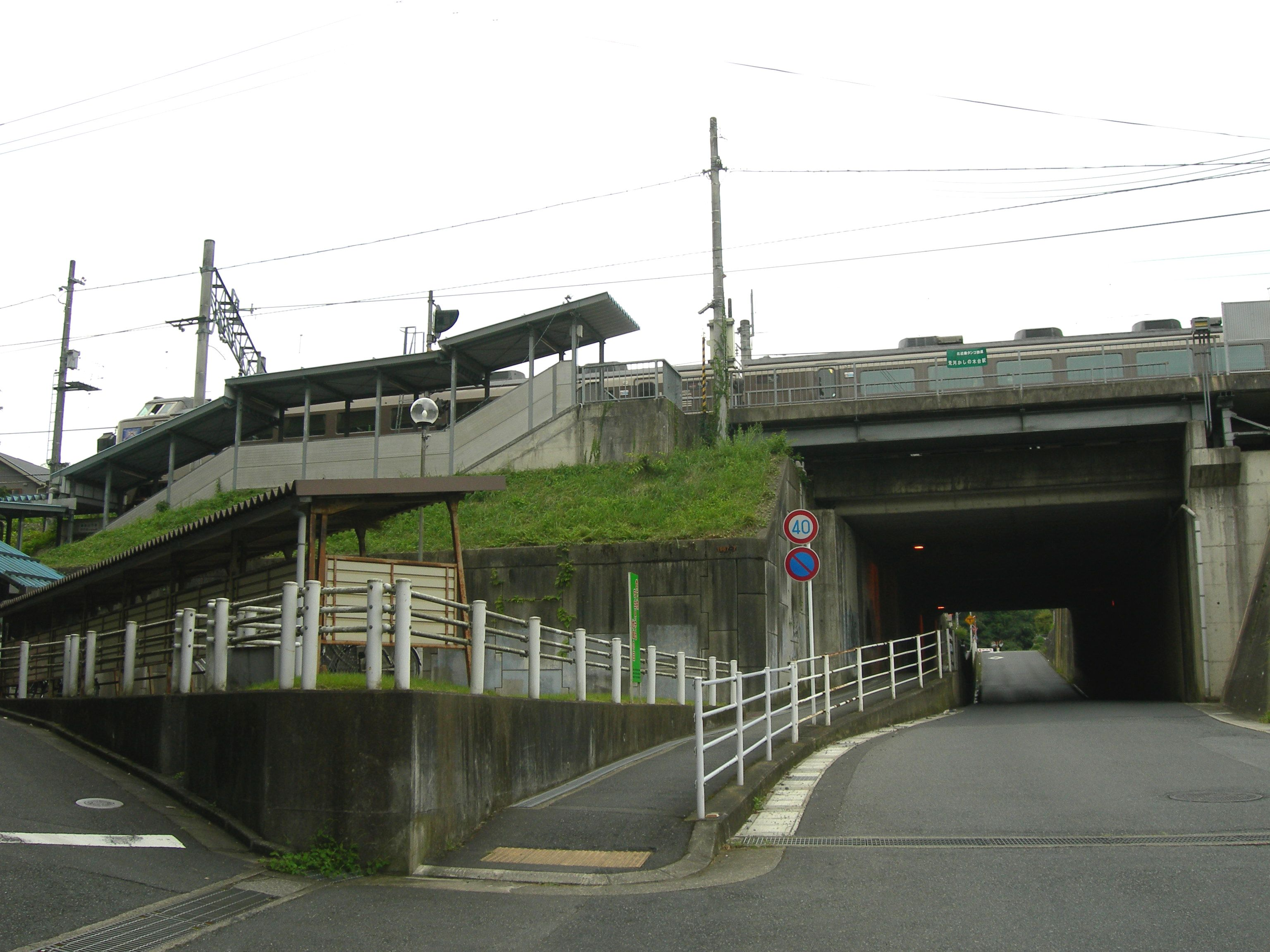
- Araga-Kashinokidai Station (August 2009)

General information
- Location: Kamiaraga, Fukuchiyama-shi, Kyoto-fu 620-0066; Japan
- Coordinates: 35.3193°N 135.1057°E
- Operator: Kyoto Tango Railway
- Line: ■ Miyafuku Line
- Distance: 2.9 km from Fukuchiyama
- Platforms: 2 side platforms
- Connections: Bus stop

Other information
- Status: Unstaffed
- Station code: F3
- Website: Official website

History
- Opened: 16 July 1988; 38 years ago

Passengers
- FY2019: 28 daily
Location
- Location within Kyoto Prefecture Location within Japan

Araga-Kashinokidai Station (荒河かしの木台駅, Araga-Kashinokidai-eki) is a passenger railway station in located in the city of Fukuchiyama, Kyoto Prefecture, Japan, operated by the private railway company Willer Trains (Kyoto Tango Railway).

== Lines ==
Araga-Kashinokidai Station is a station of the Miyafuku Line, and is located 2.9 kilometers (1.8 mi) from the terminus of the line at Fukuchiyama Station.

== Station layout ==
The station consists of two opposed side platforms on an embankment, connected by an underground passage. The station is unattended. There is no station building except for shelters on the platforms.

== Adjacent stations ==
«	Service	»
Miyafuku Line
Fukuchiyama-shimin-byōin-guchi	Local (including Tango Aomatsu 3, 4)	Maki
Fukuchiyama (Ōeyama 4, 5, 6); Fukuchiyama-shimin-byōin-guchi (Ōeyama 1, 2, 3, 7)	Rapid Ōeyama	Maki
Fukuchiyama	Rapid Tango Aomatsu 2	Maki
Rapid Tango Aomatsu 1: Does not stop at this station
Limited express Hashidate, Tango Relay: Does not stop at this station

== History ==
The station was opened on July 16, 1988.

== Passenger statistics ==
In fiscal 2018, the station was used by an average of 28 passengers daily.

== Surrounding area ==
- Kashi no Kidai housing area

== See also ==
- List of railway stations in Japan
