= Ōe Station (Kyoto) =

Railway station in Fukuchiyama, Kyoto Prefecture, Japan

Ōe Station 大江駅
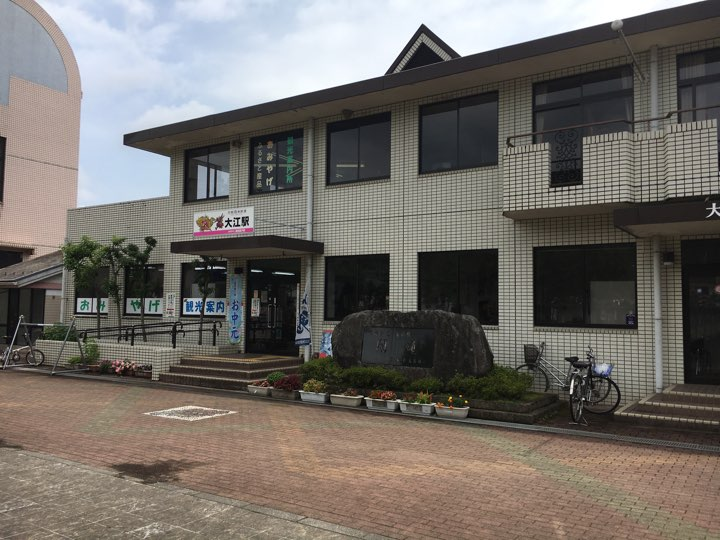
- Ōe Station, July 2017

General information
- Location: Ōecho Komori, Fukuchiyama-shi, Kyoto-fu 620-0301; Japan
- Coordinates: 35°23′20″N 135°08′51″E
- Operator: Kyoto Tango Railway
- Line: ■ Miyafuku Line
- Distance: 12.5 km from Fukuchiyama
- Platforms: island platform
- Connections: Bus stop

Other information
- Status: Unstaffed
- Station code: F7
- Website: Official website

History
- Opened: 16 July 1988; 38 years ago

Passengers
- FY2018: 79 daily
Location
- Location within Kyoto Prefecture Location within Japan

Ōe Station (大江駅, Ōe-eki) is a passenger railway station in located in the city of Fukuchiyama, Kyoto Prefecture, Japan, operated by the private railway company Willer Trains (Kyoto Tango Railway).

== Lines ==
Ōe Station is a station of the Miyafuku Line, and is located 12.5 kilometers (7.8 mi) from the terminus of the line at Fukuchiyama Station.

== Station layout ==
The station consists of one ground-level island platform connected to the station building by an underground passage. The station is staffed.

== Adjacent stations ==
«	Service	»
Miyafuku Line
Gujō	Local (including "Tango Aomatsu" 3, 4)	Ōe-kōkōmae
Maki ("Ōeyama" 1, 4, 5, 6); Gujō ("Ōeyama" 2, 3, 7)	Rapid "Ōeyama"	Ōe-kōkōmae ("Ōeyama" 1, 2, 3); Ōeyamaguchi-Naiku ("Ōeyama" 4, 5, 6, 7)
Fukuchiyama (1); Maki (2)	Rapid "Tango Aomatsu"1, 2	Ōeyamaguchi-Naiku (2); Miyazu (1)
Fukuchiyama	Limited express "Hashidate", "Tango Relay"	Miyazu

== History ==
The station was opened on 16 July 1988.

== Passenger statistics ==
In fiscal 2018, the station was used by an average of 79 passengers daily.

== Surrounding area ==
- Onigawara Park
- Fukuchiyama City Chamber of Commerce
- Fukuchiyama Municipal Hospital Oe Branch
- Fukuchiyama City Hall Oe Branch

== See also ==
- List of railway stations in Japan
