= Willer Express =

Japanese bus company

Willer Inc.
- Native name: ウィラー
- Type: Kabushiki kaisha
- Founded: June 9, 2005
- Headquarters: Osaka, Japan
- Area served: Honshu, Shikoku, Kyushu
- Website: travel.willer.co.jp

Willer Express (ウィラーエクスプレス, stylized WILLER EXPRESS) is a major highway bus company operating in Japan since 2005 with routes spanning almost the entire country, from Aomori Prefecture at the northern tip of the main island Honshu to the southern island Kyushu. Annual sales are approximately $120 million/year, with both domestic passengers and foreigners served through direct sales, a website, as well as the "Japan Bus Pass" and a double-decker tour bus route. Pricing on routes depends on day/time of travel, with significant variation between peak and off-peak travel.

== Overview ==
Willer Express is a subsidiary of the Willer Group, the company which owns Willer Alliance Inc. and Willer Express Japan Inc. As of December 2015, Willer Express employed a total of 64 people. The company's president is Shigetaka Murase. It has offices in Osaka and Tokyo.

The company began in 2006 as a major Tour Bus company in Japan. From December 2011 it also entered the intercities bus business.

=== Business offices ===
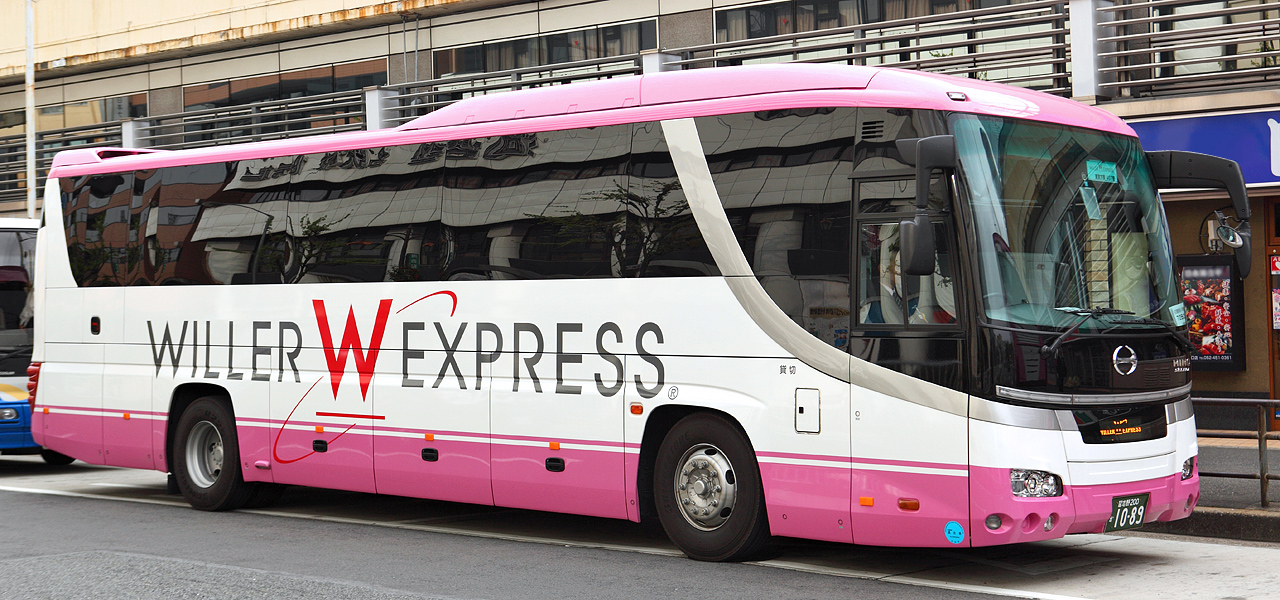
A Willer Express bus

- Osaka Main Office; at Umeda Sky Building
- Tokyo Main Office; at Shinagawa Intercity Building
- WILLER Express Cafe; at Umeda Sky Building

== Main Highway bus routes ==
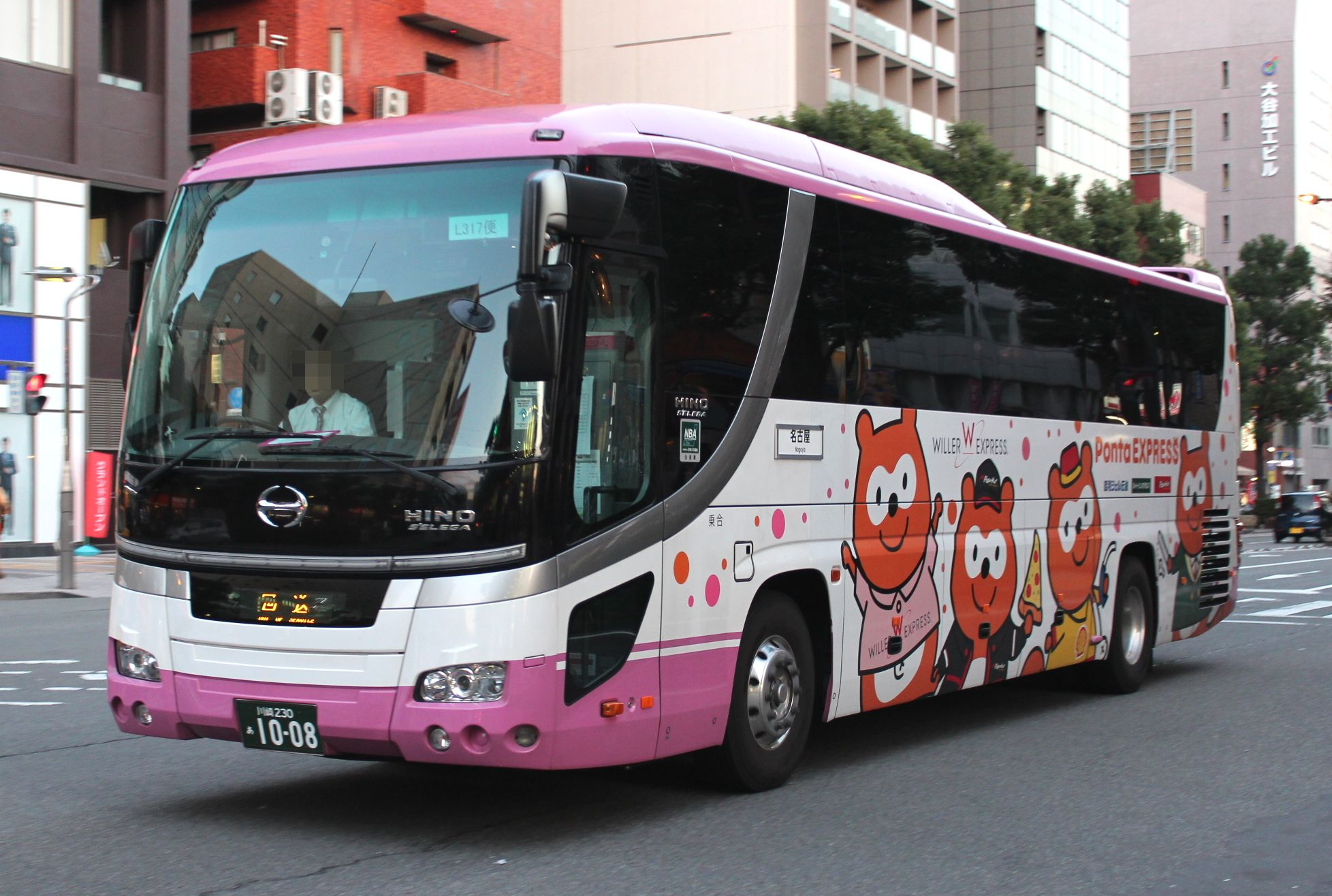
The Willer Express' Ponta Express.

- Tokyo - Kyoto, Osaka, Wakayama
- Tokyo - Nagoya
- Tokyo - Hiroshima
- Tokyo - Okayama
- Tokyo - Sendai
- Tokyo - Niigata
- Tokyo - Nagano
- Tokyo - Toyama, Kanazawa, Fukui
- Tokyo - Izumo, Shimane
- Tokyo - Ise, Mie
- Osaka - Nagoya
- Osaka - Shizuoka
- Osaka - Niigata
- Osaka - Toyama
- Osaka - Izumo, Shimane
- Osaka - Hiroshima
- Osaka - Matsuyama
- Osaka - Hakata, Saga
- Hiroshima - Hakata, Saga
