= Isa Station =

Railway station in Fukuchiyama, Kyoto Prefecture, Japan

Isa Station 石原駅
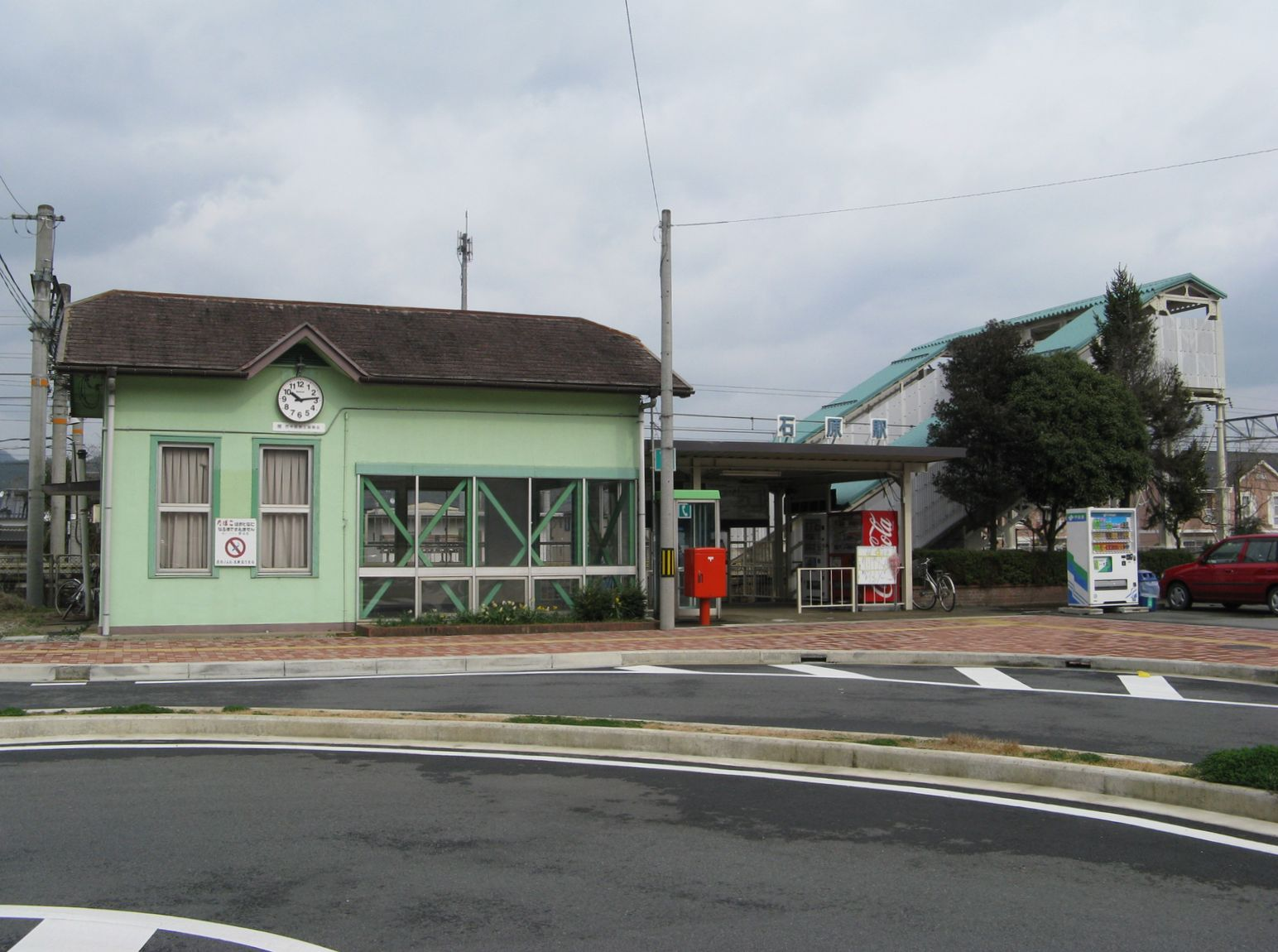
- Isa Station, 2009

General information
- Location: Isa 1-chome, Fukuchiyama-shi, Kyoto-fu 620-0804; Japan
- Coordinates: 35°18′04″N 135°10′51″E
- Owner: West Japan Railway Company
- Operator: West Japan Railway Company
- Line: San'in Main Line
- Distance: 82.8 km (51.4 miles) from Kyoto
- Platforms: 1 island platform
- Connections: Bus stop

Other information
- Status: Unstaffed
- Website: Official website

History
- Opened: 3 November 1904

Passengers
- FY 2023: 826 daily

Services
Preceding station	JR West	Following station
Fukuchiyama towards Kinosaki-Onsen	San'in Line	Takatsu towards Kyoto
Location
- Location within Kyoto Prefecture Location within Japan

Isa Station (石原駅, Isa-eki) is a passenger railway station located in the city of Fukuchiyama, Kyoto Prefecture, Japan, operated by West Japan Railway Company (JR West).

== Lines ==
Isa Station is served by the San'in Main Line, and is located 82.8 kilometers from the terminus of the line at Kyoto.

== Station layout ==
The station consists of one ground-level island platform connected to the station building by a footbridge. The station is unattended.

=== Platforms ===
1	■ San'in Main Line	for Ayabe and Kyoto
2	■ San'in Main Line	for Fukuchiyama and Toyooka

== Adjacent stations ==
«	Service	»
West Japan Railway Company (JR West) San'in Main Line
Takatsu	Local (Including Rapid Service when running between Sonobe and Kyoto)	Fukuchiyama

== History ==
Isa Station opened on November 3, 1904. With the privatization of the Japan National Railways (JNR) on April 1, 1987, the station came under the aegis of the West Japan Railway Company.

== Passenger statistics ==
In fiscal 2016, the station was used by an average of 491 passengers daily

== Surrounding area ==
- Osadano Industrial Park
- Kyoto Prefectural High School
- Fukuchiyama City Senkyo Elementary School

== See also ==
- List of railway stations in Japan
