= Miyafuku Line =

Railway line in Japan

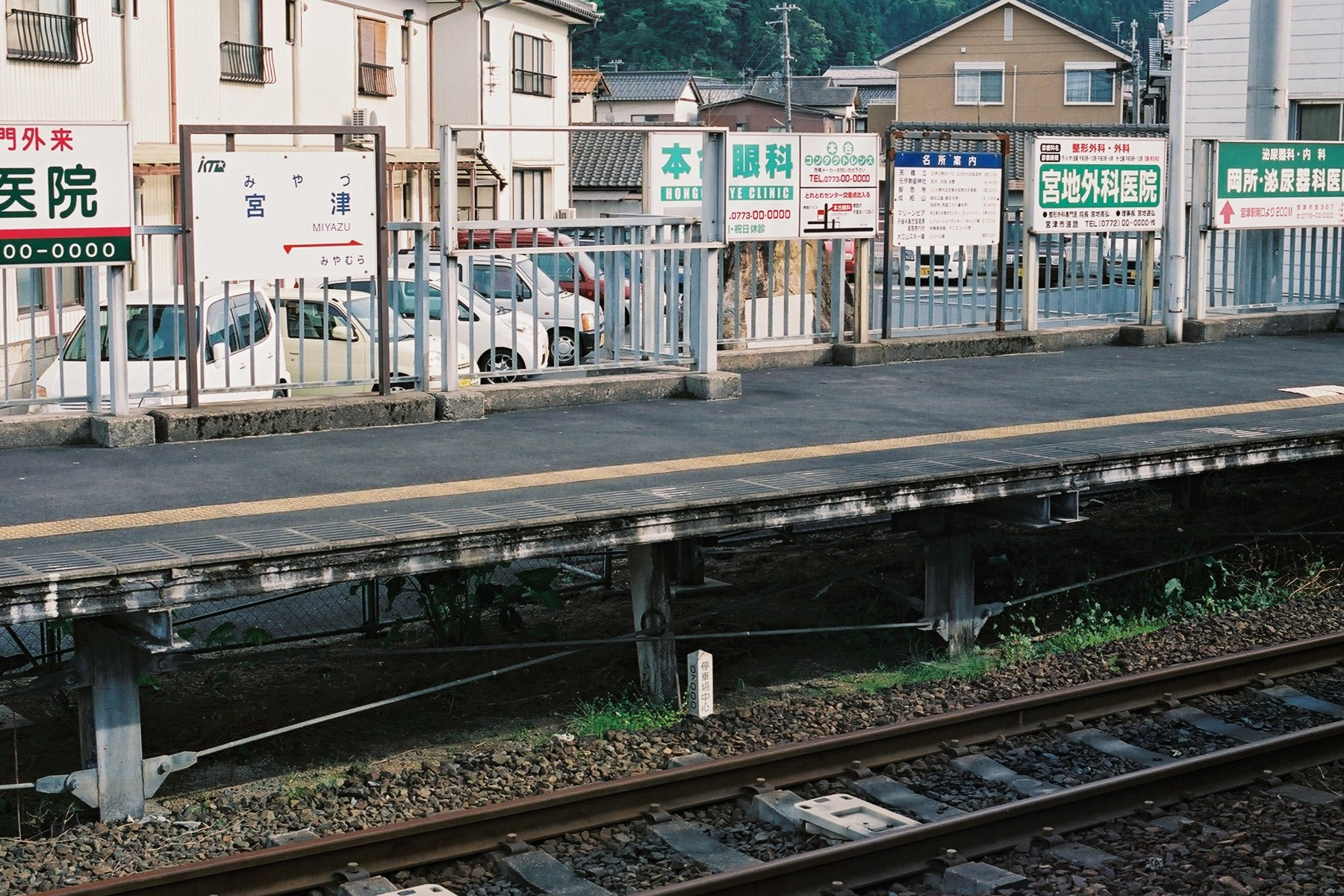

Overview
- Native name: 宮福線
- Owner: Kyoto Tango Railway
- Locale: Kyoto
- Termini: Miyazu Station; Fukuchiyama Station
- Stations: 14

Service
- Type: Commuter rail line
- Operator(s): Willer Trains

History
- Opened: 1988

Technical
- Line length: 30.4 km (18.9 mi)
- Track gauge: 1,067 mm (3 ft 6 in)
- Electrification: 1500 V DC Overhead catenary
- Operating speed: 130 km/h (81 mph)

The Miyafuku Line (宮福線, Miyafuku-sen) is a railway line of Kyoto Tango Railway in Kyoto Prefecture, Japan. Trains on the line are operated by Willer Trains Inc. as part of its Kyoto Tango Railway system. The line operates between Fukuchiyama Station in Fukuchiyama and Miyazu Station in Miyazu. At Miyazu Station, Limited Express services and some Rapid trains operate one stop further to/from Amanohashidate Station on the Miyazu Line.

== History ==
Building of the line was approved in 1953, with construction commencing in 1966, but being suspended in 1980 due to the financial constraints being experienced by JNR at the time.

In 1982 the Miyafuku Railway Co. was established to recommence construction, which resumed the following year.

The line opened in 1988, featuring 10 tunnels, including the 3215-meter Fukō Tunnel, the 2175-meter Shimoamazu Tunnel and the 2103-meter Tochiba Tunnel. The following year the company renamed itself the Kitakinki Tango Railway.

The line was electrified in 1996 to enable through services with the JR West Fukuchiyama Line. JR West operates electric multiple unit (EMU) trains on the line while all of Kyoto Tango Railway's trains are diesel multiple unit (DMU) trains.

On April 1, 2015, the train operation business of Kitakinki Tango Railway was transferred to Willer Trains, Inc., which named the railway system the Kyoto Tango Railway. At this time, the name of Atsunakatonya Station was changed to Fukuchiyama-shimin-byōin-guchi Station. Unlike the Miyazu Line, the name of this line was not changed.

== Stations ==
- All stations located within Kyoto Prefecture.
- Legend: S - all trains stop; s - some trains stop; s - "Tango Aomatsu" 2 stops; | - all trains pass

No.	Station	Japanese	Distance (km)		Rapid "Oeyama"	Rapid "Tango Aomatsu"	Limited Express	Transfers	Location
No.	Station	Japanese	Between Stations	Total	Rapid "Oeyama"	Rapid "Tango Aomatsu"	Limited Express	Transfers	Location
Miyafuku Line
F1	Fukuchiyama	福知山	-	0.0	S	S	S	JR West: San'in Main Line, Fukuchiyama Line	Fukuchiyama
F2	Fukuchiyama-shimin-byōin-guchi	福知山市民病院口	1.5	1.5	s	|	|		Fukuchiyama
F3	Aragakashinokidai	荒河かしの木台	1.4	2.9	S	s	|		Fukuchiyama
F4	Maki	牧	2.2	5.1	S	s	|		Fukuchiyama
F5	Shimo-Amazu	下天津	2.5	7.6	s	|	|		Fukuchiyama
F6	Gujō	公庄	2.4	10.0	s	|	|		Fukuchiyama
F7	Ōe	大江	2.5	12.5	S	S	S		Fukuchiyama
F8	Ōe-Kōkōmae	大江高校前	0.9	13.4	s	|	|		Fukuchiyama
F9	Futamata	二俣	2.0	15.4	|	|	|		Fukuchiyama
F10	Ōeyamaguchi-Naiku	大江山口内宮	2.2	17.6	S	s	|		Fukuchiyama
F11	Karakawa	辛皮	3.7	21.3	s	|	|		Miyazu
F12	Kita	喜多	6.0	27.3	s	|	|		Miyazu
F13	Miyamura	宮村	1.6	28.9	S	s	|		Miyazu
14	Miyazu	宮津	1.5	30.4	S	S	S	Miyazu Line (Through service to/from Amanohashidate for Limited Express and some Rapid trains)	Miyazu
Miyazu Line
T15	Amanohashidate †	天橋立	4.4	34.8		S	S		Miyazu

† Only Limited Express services and some Rapid trains operate to/from Amanohashidate. All Local trains terminate/originate at Miyazu.

== See also ==
- List of railway lines in Japan
