= Fukuchiyama =

Fukuchiyama 福知山市
- City
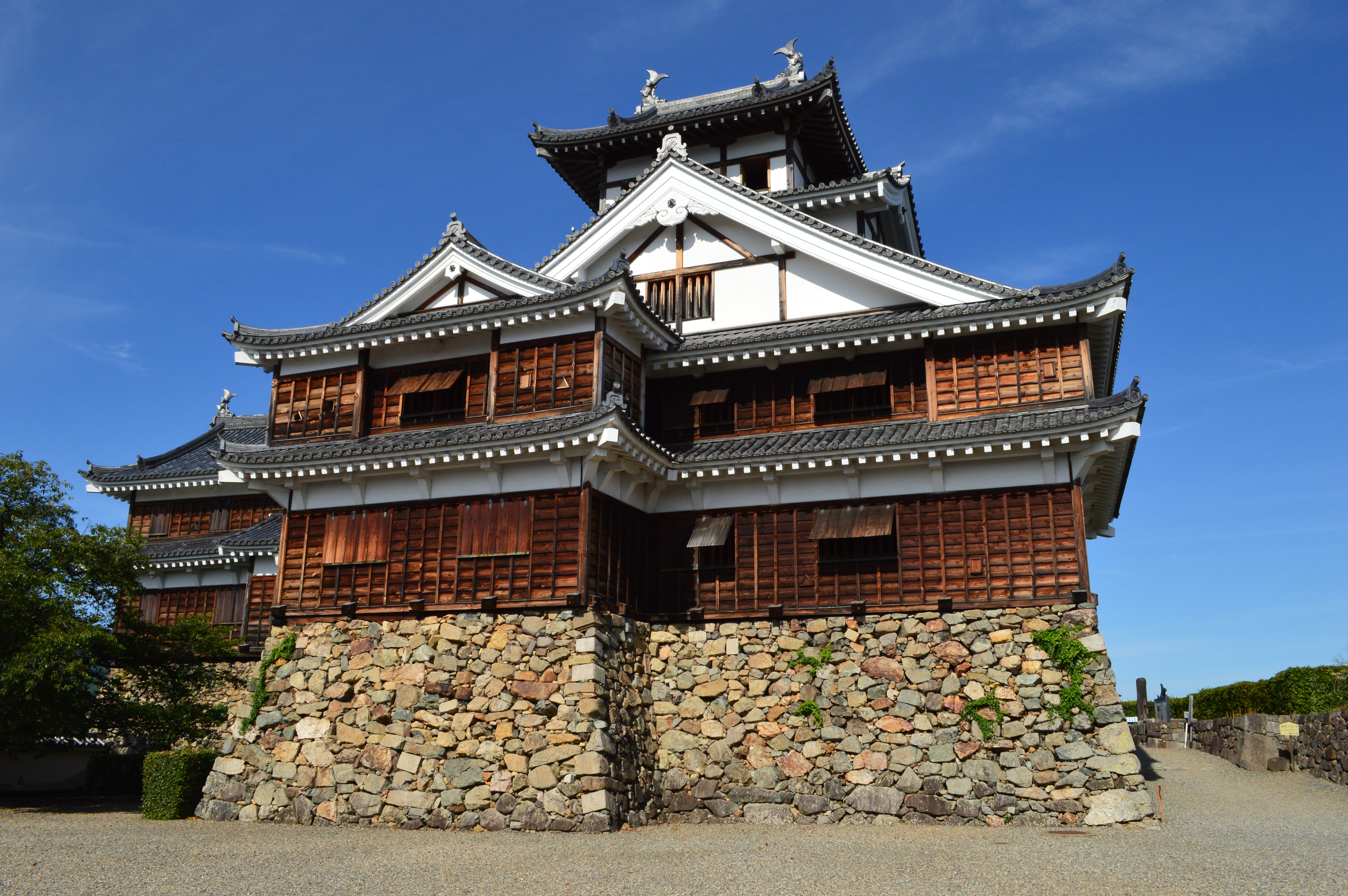
- Fukuchiyama Castle

- Flag Emblem

- Location of Fukuchiyama in Kyōto Prefecture

- Location in Japan
- Coordinates: 35°18′N 135°8′E
- Country: Japan
- Region: Kansai
- Prefecture: Kyōto

Government
  - Mayor: Kazuo Ohashi

Area
  - Total: 552.54 km^{2} (213.34 sq mi)

Population (March 21, 2022)
  - Total: 76,037
  - Density: 137.61/km^{2} (356.42/sq mi)
- Time zone: UTC+09:00 (JST)
- City hall address: 13-1 Naiki, Fukuchiyama-shi 620-8501
- Climate: Cfa
- Website: Official website
- Symbols
- Bird: Japanese bush-warbler; green pheasant
- Flower: Chinese bellflower; satsuki azalea; Lespedeza; Japanese azalea (Rhododendron molle subsp. japonicum); wisteria
- Tree: Japanese zelkova; oak; Japanese cypress; ume

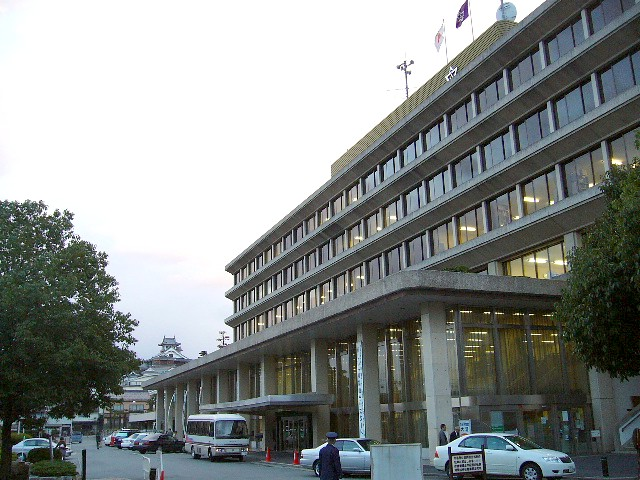
Fukuchiyama City Hall

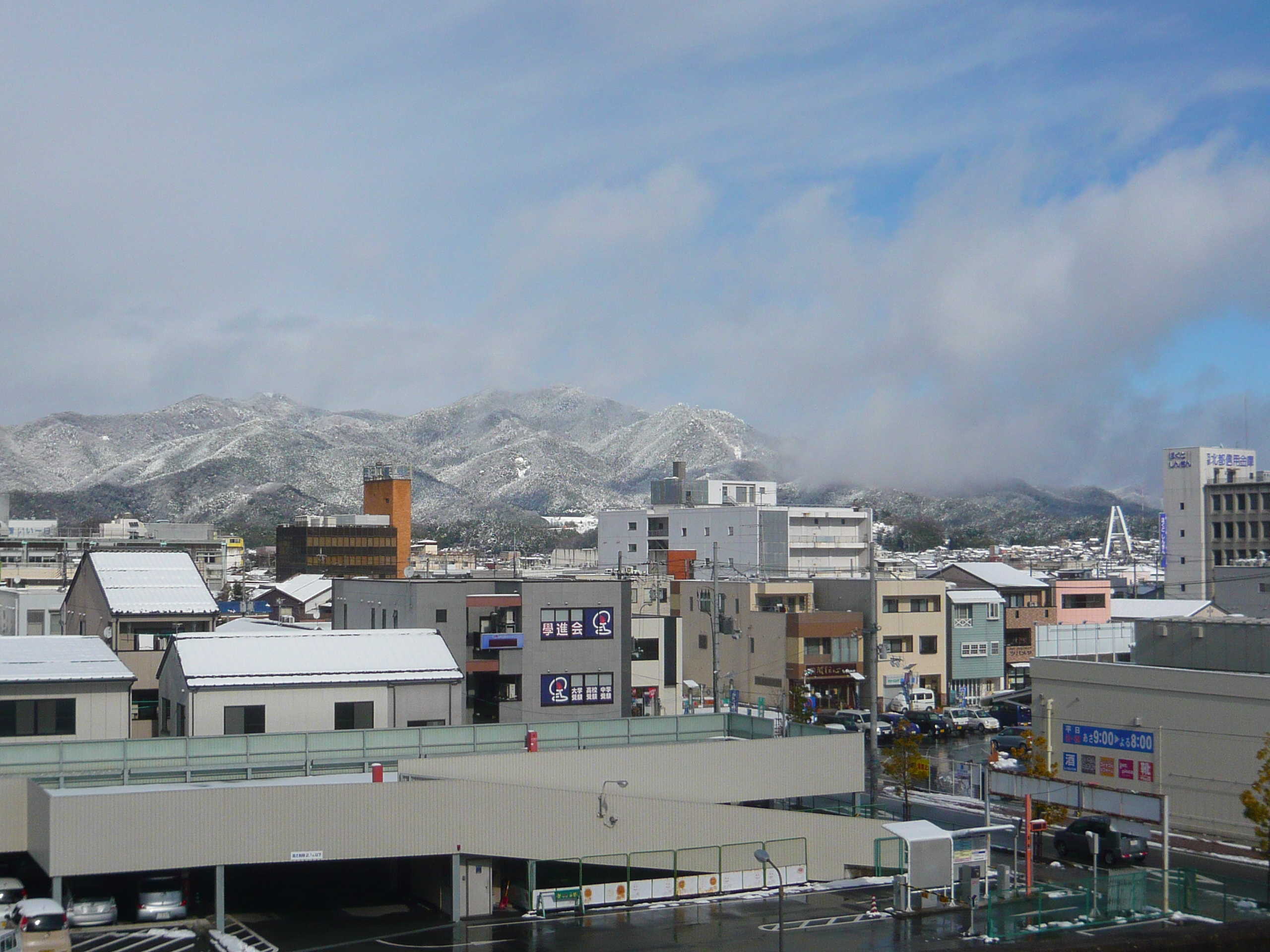
Fukuchiyama city center

Fukuchiyama (福知山市, Fukuchiyama-shi) is a city in northern Kyoto Prefecture, Japan. As of 31 March 2022, the city had an estimated population of 76,037 in 36412 households and a population density of 140 persons per km^{2}. The total area of the city is 697.55 square kilometres (269.33 sq mi).

== Geography ==
Fukuchiyama is located in northwestern Kyoto Prefecture, bordering Hyōgo Prefecture to the west. It is centered on the Fukuchiyama Basin formed by the Yura River, and is surrounded by mountains to the south, west, and east. It is located about 70 kilometers from downtown Osaka, 60 kilometers from Kyoto or Kobe City, and about 30 kilometers from Toyooka or Maizuru. The highest elevation in the city is 839.17 meters above sea level, and the lowest is 7.11 meters. The city center extends along the Yura River.

=== Neighbouring municipalities ===
Hyōgo Prefecture

- Asago
- Sasayama
- Tamba
- Toyooka

Kyoto Prefecture

- Ayabe
- Kyōtango
- Maizuru
- Miyazu
- Yosano

=== Climate ===
Fukuchiyama has a humid subtropical climate (Köppen Cfa), featuring a marked seasonal variation in temperature and precipitation. Summers are hot and humid, but winters are relatively cold with occasional snowfall. The average annual temperature in Fukuchiyama is 14.6 °C (58.3 °F). The average annual rainfall is 1,623.8 mm (63.93 in) with September as the wettest month. The temperatures are highest on average in August, at around 27.0 °C (80.6 °F), and lowest in January, at around 3.2 °C (37.8 °F). Its record high is 39.6 °C (103.3 °F), reached on 22 August 2018, and its record low is −10.0 °C (14.0 °F), reached on 16 February 1977.

Climate data for Fukuchiyama (1991−2020 normals, extremes 1976−present)
Month	Jan	Feb	Mar	Apr	May	Jun	Jul	Aug	Sep	Oct	Nov	Dec	Year
Record high °C (°F)	17.6 (63.7)	22.1 (71.8)	25.1 (77.2)	31.1 (88.0)	33.6 (92.5)	37.8 (100.0)	38.8 (101.8)	39.6 (103.3)	38.3 (100.9)	32.5 (90.5)	26.0 (78.8)	23.4 (74.1)	39.6 (103.3)
Mean daily maximum °C (°F)	7.9 (46.2)	8.9 (48.0)	13.1 (55.6)	19.4 (66.9)	24.4 (75.9)	27.3 (81.1)	31.1 (88.0)	32.8 (91.0)	28.0 (82.4)	22.2 (72.0)	16.3 (61.3)	10.5 (50.9)	20.2 (68.3)
Daily mean °C (°F)	3.2 (37.8)	3.8 (38.8)	7.2 (45.0)	12.7 (54.9)	17.9 (64.2)	21.8 (71.2)	25.9 (78.6)	27.0 (80.6)	22.7 (72.9)	16.5 (61.7)	10.7 (51.3)	5.5 (41.9)	14.6 (58.2)
Mean daily minimum °C (°F)	−0.2 (31.6)	−0.1 (31.8)	2.1 (35.8)	6.7 (44.1)	12.2 (54.0)	17.5 (63.5)	22.1 (71.8)	22.9 (73.2)	18.8 (65.8)	12.4 (54.3)	6.5 (43.7)	1.8 (35.2)	10.2 (50.4)
Record low °C (°F)	−9.8 (14.4)	−10.0 (14.0)	−6.4 (20.5)	−3.0 (26.6)	1.9 (35.4)	7.5 (45.5)	12.8 (55.0)	15.2 (59.4)	7.2 (45.0)	2.1 (35.8)	−3.0 (26.6)	−7.3 (18.9)	−10.0 (14.0)
Average precipitation mm (inches)	103.9 (4.09)	96.5 (3.80)	115.4 (4.54)	114.1 (4.49)	137.5 (5.41)	163.9 (6.45)	197.5 (7.78)	166.7 (6.56)	214.1 (8.43)	149.6 (5.89)	82.9 (3.26)	89.5 (3.52)	1,623.8 (63.93)
Average precipitation days (≥ 1.0 mm)	14.8	13.8	13.6	10.5	10.6	11.5	12.4	9.1	11.1	9.9	10.0	13.1	140.4
Mean monthly sunshine hours	91.1	92.3	129.6	164.2	175.5	127.3	140.7	176.7	119.0	121.2	105.0	96.7	1,547.4
Source: Japan Meteorological Agency

== Demographics ==
Per Japanese census data, the population of Fukuchiyama has remained relatively stable over the past 60 years.

Historical population
Year	Pop.	±%
1960	87,151	—
1970	76,844	−11.8%
1980	81,398	+5.9%
1990	82,791	+1.7%
2000	83,120	+0.4%
2010	79,668	−4.2%
2020	77,306	−3.0%

== History ==
Fukuchiyama is part of ancient Tanba Province. From various excavated items, people have been living along the Yura River since at least the Jōmon period and the area was a transportation hub since ancient times. In the Heian period, the Fukuchiyama basin was developed into a number of shōen landed estates by the Five regent houses in Kyoto. In the Sengoku period, the area came under the control of Akechi Mitsuhide and a castle town developed around Fukuchiyama Castle. In the Edo Period, it was the center of Fukuchiyama Domain, which was ruled by a succession of fudai daimyō. After the Meiji restoration, the town of Fukuchiyama was established on April 1, 1889 with the creation of the modern municipalities system. It was raised to city status on April 1, 1937, becoming the third city in Kyoto Prefecture after Kyoto and Fushimi. The city borders expanded in 1936, 1949, 1955. On January 1, 2006, the towns of Miwa and Yakuno (both from Amata District), and the town of Ōe (from Kasa District) were merged into Fukuchiyama. Amata District and Kasa District were abolished by this merger.

== Government ==
Fukuchiyama has a mayor-council form of government with a directly elected mayor and a unicameral city council of 24 members. Fukuchiyama contributes two members to the Kyoto Prefectural Assembly. In terms of national politics, the city is part of the Kyoto 5th district of the lower house of the Diet of Japan.

== Economy ==
Fukuchiyama has a mixed economy with commerce, light manufacturing and agriculture. Traditionally, the local economy was noted for indigo dying, cotton and silk production; however, the city industrialized as a supplier of components for the military. Postwar, a number of industrial parks, notably the Osadano Industrial Park, have developed.

== Education ==
Fukuchiyama has 19 public elementary schools and eight public middle schools and one combined elementary/middle school operated by the city government and two public high schools and one combined middle/high school operated by the Kyoto Prefectural Department of Education. There are also two private high schools and one private combined middle high school. The prefecture also operates one special education school for the handicapped. A private college, the University of Fukuchiyama, is located in Fukuchiyama and the Kyoto Institute of Technology has a campus in the city.

== Transportation ==
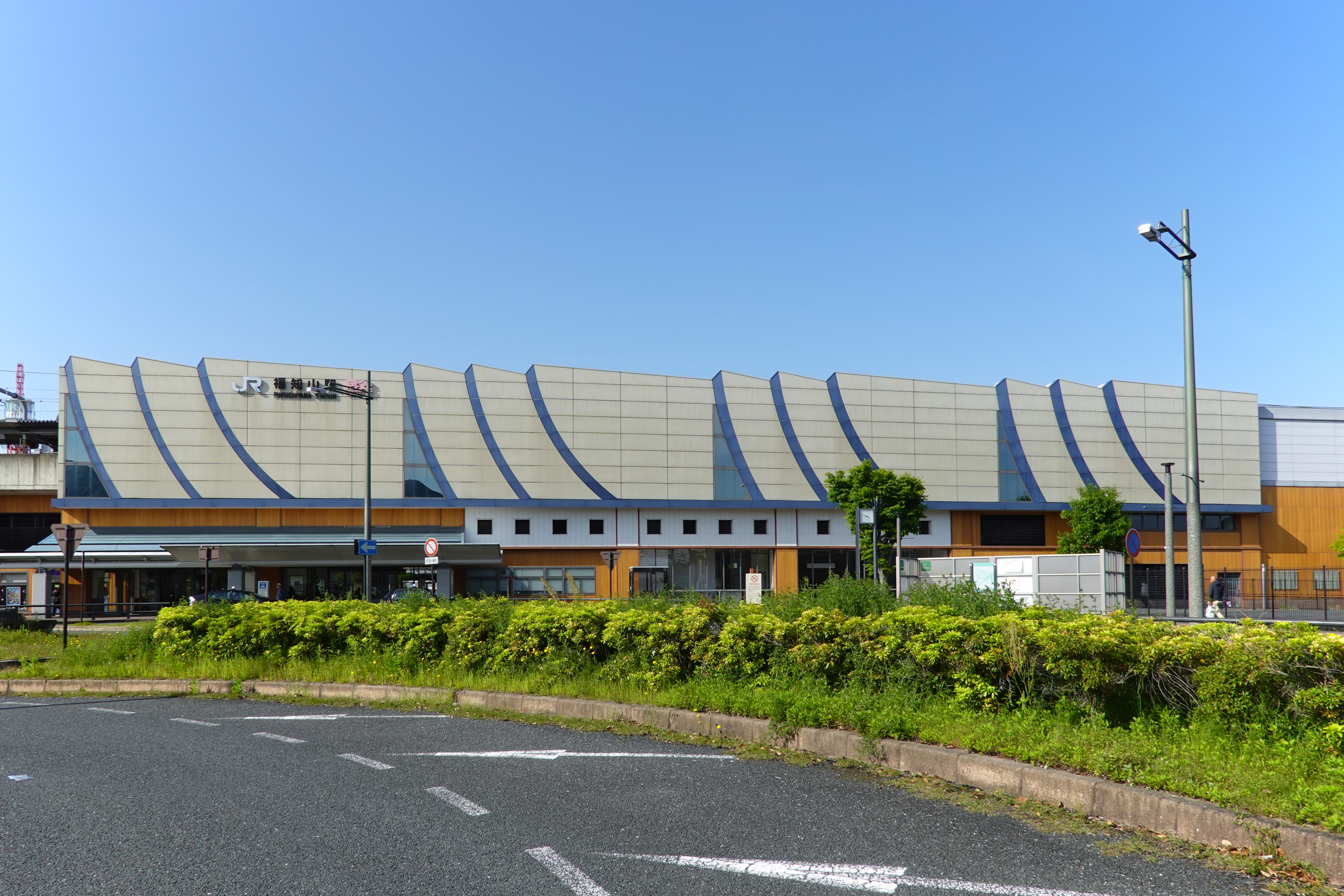
Fukuchiyama Station

=== Railway ===
JR West – San'in Main Line

- Isa - Fukuchiyama - Kamikawaguchi - Shimo-Yakuno - Kami-Yakuno

JR West – Fukuchiyama Line

- Fukuchiyama

Kyoto Tango Railway – Miyafuku Line

- Fukuchiyama - Fukuchiyama-shimin-byōin-guchi - Aragakashinokidai - Maki - Shimo-Amazu - Gujō - Ōe - Ōe-Kōkōmae - Futamata - Ōeyamaguchi-Naiku

=== Highway ===
- Maizuru-Wakasa Expressway
- National Route 9
- National Route 173
- National Route 175
- National Route 176
- National Route 426
- National Route 429

== Local attractions ==
- Fukuchiyama Castle

=== Sports ===
Fukuchiyama is the birthplace of tambo rugby.

== Noted people from Fukuchiyama ==
- Kenta Kobashi, a professional wrestling icon
- Osamu Shimomura, a Nobel Prize–winning chemist
- Sadakazu Tanigaki, Secretary-General of the LDP
