= Fukuchiyama Castle =

Castle in Fukuchiyama, Kyoto prefecture, Japan

Coordinates: 35°17′48″N 135°07′47″E

Fukuchiyama Castle 福知山城
- Fukuchiyama, Kyoto Prefecture, Japan
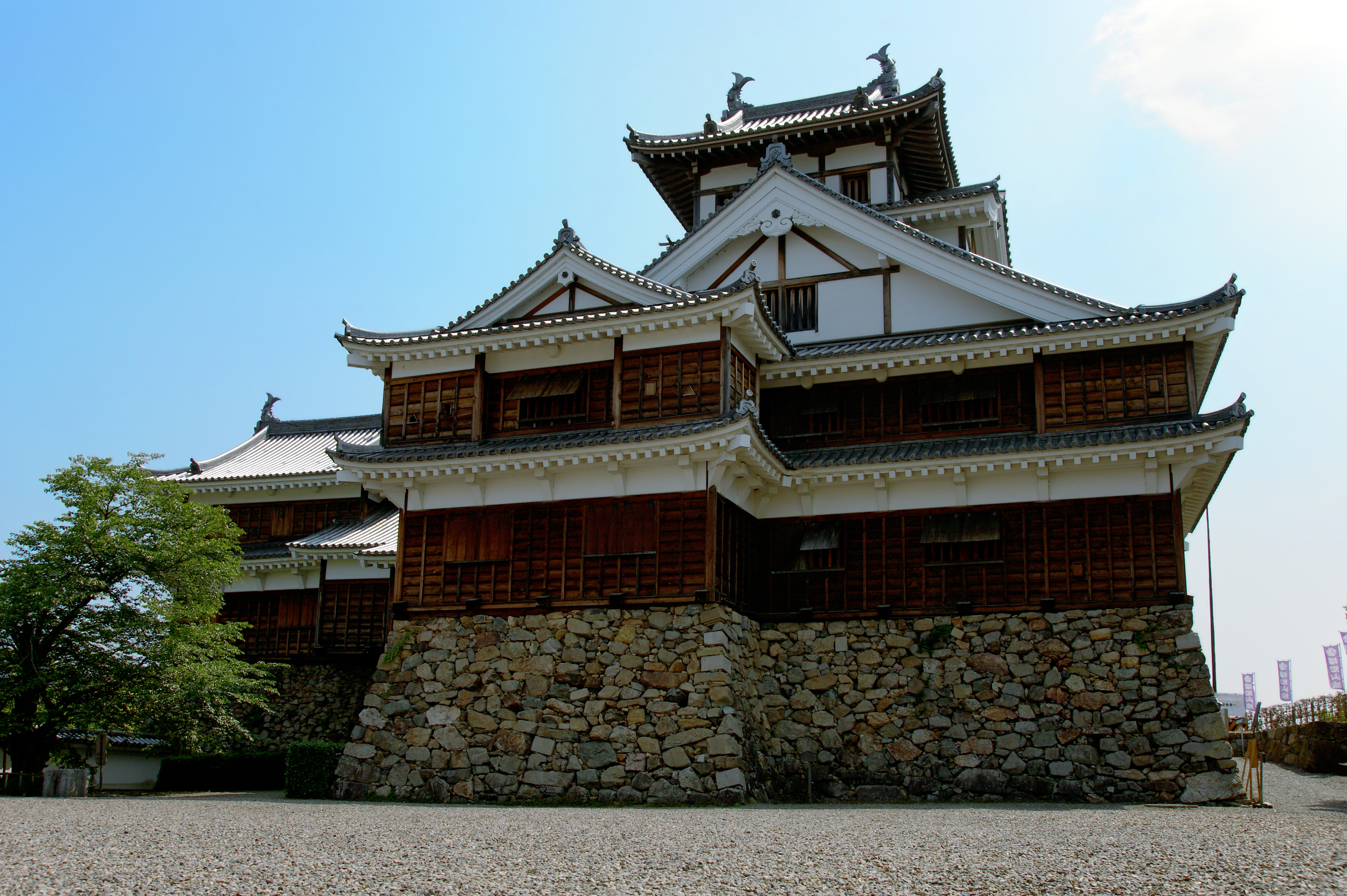
- The tenshu (keep) of Fukuchiyama Castle

Site information
- Type: hilltop
- Owner: City of Fukuchiyama
- Condition: Tenshu and a few other buildings reconstructed

Location

Site history
- Built: 1572
- Built by: Yokoyama clan
- In use: 1572-1872
- Materials: stone, earthwork, wood
- Demolished: 1872

Garrison information
- Occupants: Yokoyama clan, Akechi Mitsuhide

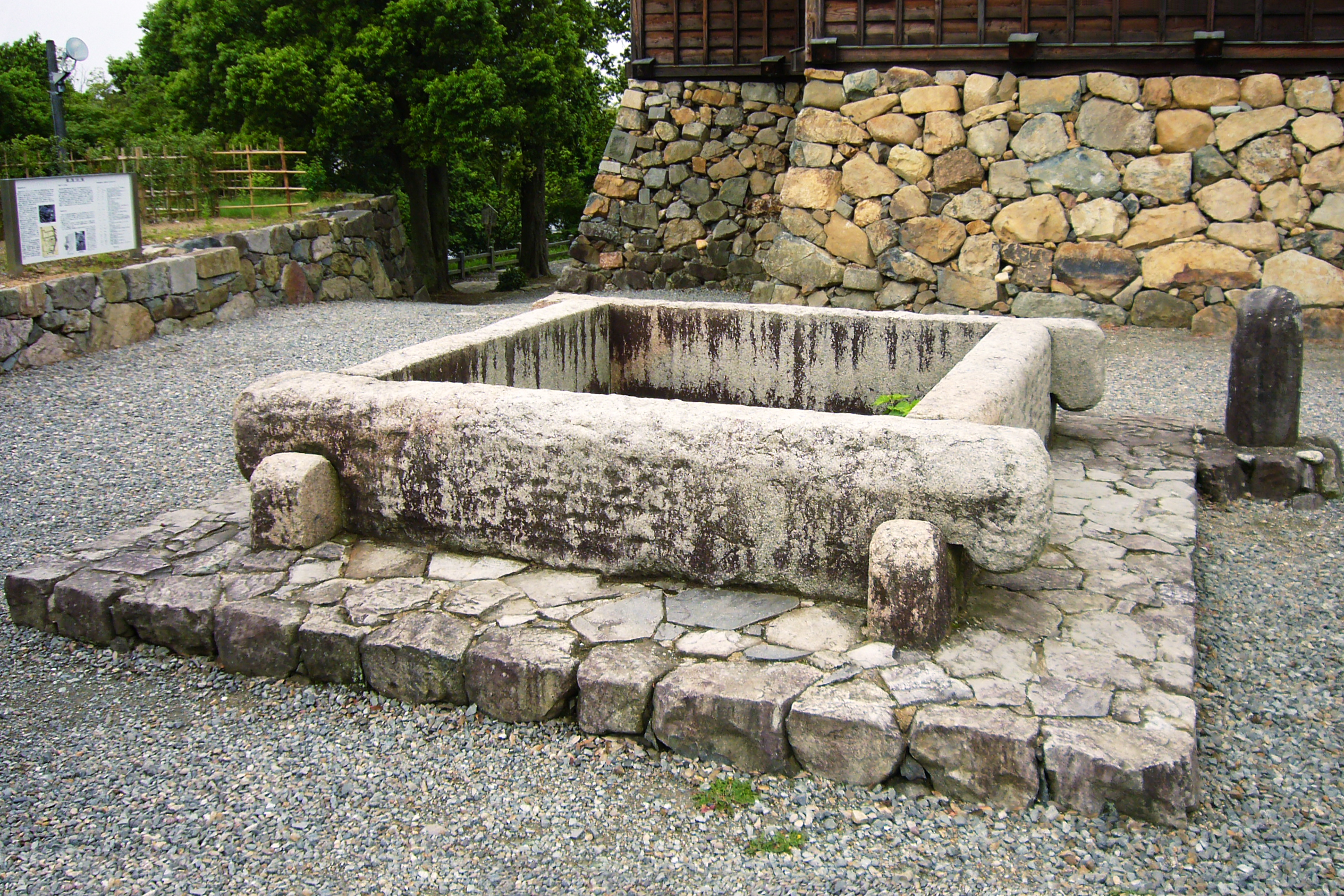
Toyoiwa-no-I

Fukuchiyama Castle (福知山城, Fukuchiyama-jō) is a castle located in Fukuchiyama, Kyoto Prefecture, Japan.

== History ==
Fukuchiyama Castle was originally built and ruled by the Yokoyama family. Following the capture of Tanba in 1576, Akechi Mitsuhide reconstructed the castle on the foundations of the older fortification in 1580. However, the castle buildings, along with many other castle buildings in Japan, were mostly dismantled in 1872 during the Meiji Restoration in the Japanese government's attempts to modernize Japan.

== Today ==
In 1986, the tenshu, or keep, of Fukuchiyama Castle was re-built following a spirited campaign by residents of the city of Fukuchiyama. It now serves as a local history museum. Also, a well named Toyoiwa-no-I is located in the castle, and is the deepest well of any castle in Japan. Many original stone walls still stand.

The Castle was listed as one of the Continued Top 100 Japanese Castles in 2017.

== Sources ==
- Welcome to Kyoto website
- Kansai collection

== Literature ==
- De Lange, William (2021). An Encyclopedia of Japanese Castles. Groningen: Toyo Press. pp. 600 pages. ISBN 978-9492722300.
- Schmorleitz, Morton S. (1974). Castles in Japan. Tokyo: Charles E. Tuttle Co. ISBN 0-8048-1102-4.
