= Fukuchiyama Station =

Railway station in Fukuchiyama, Kyoto Prefecture, Japan

Fukuchiyama Station 福知山駅
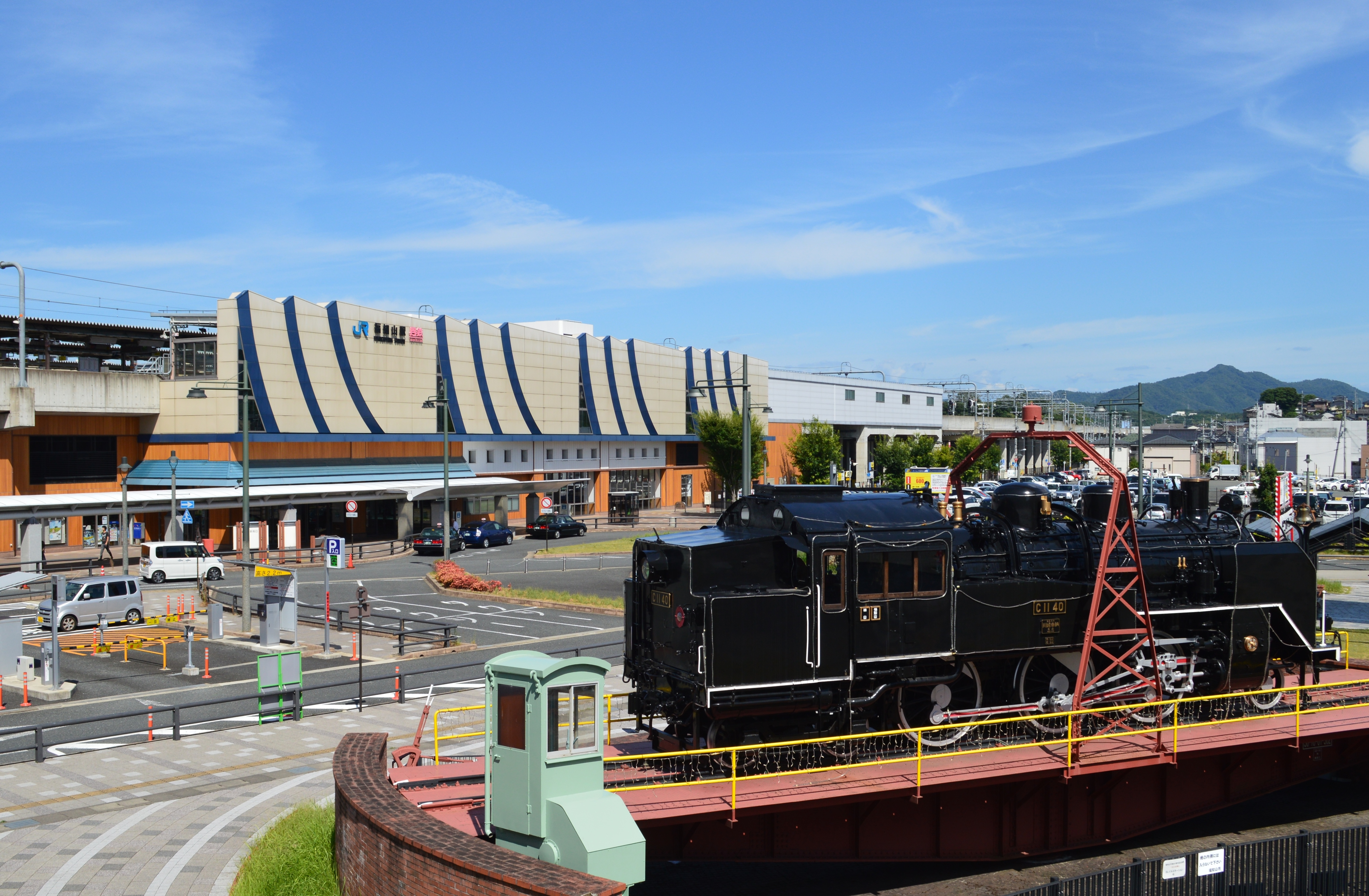
- Fukuchiyama Station south exit in 2018

General information
- Location: Amada, Fukuchiyama-shi, Kyoto-fu 620-0045; Japan
- Coordinates: 35°17′48″N 135°07′07″E
- Operator: West Japan Railway Company; Kyoto Tango Railway
- Lines: San'in Main Line; Fukuchiyama Line; ■ Miyafuku Line
- Platforms: 1 side + 3 island platforms

Other information
- Status: Staffed (Midori no Madoguchi )
- Station code: F01 (Kyoto Tango Railway)

History
- Opened: 1 April 1904; 122 years ago

Passengers
- FY 2023; FY 2016: 6,588 (JR West); 1,033 (KTR)
Location
- Location within Kyoto Prefecture Location within Japan

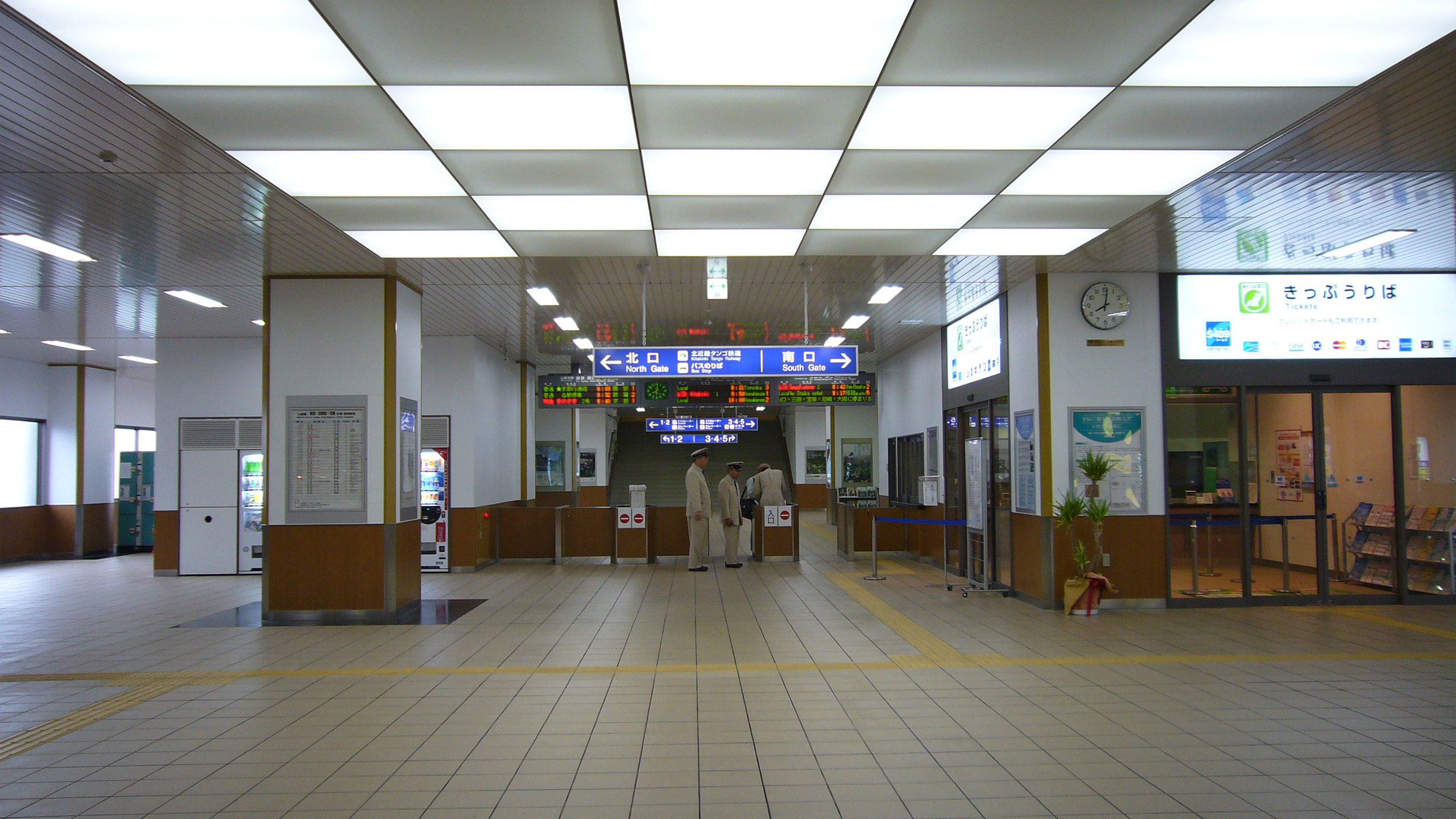
Fukuchiyama Station interior, June 2006

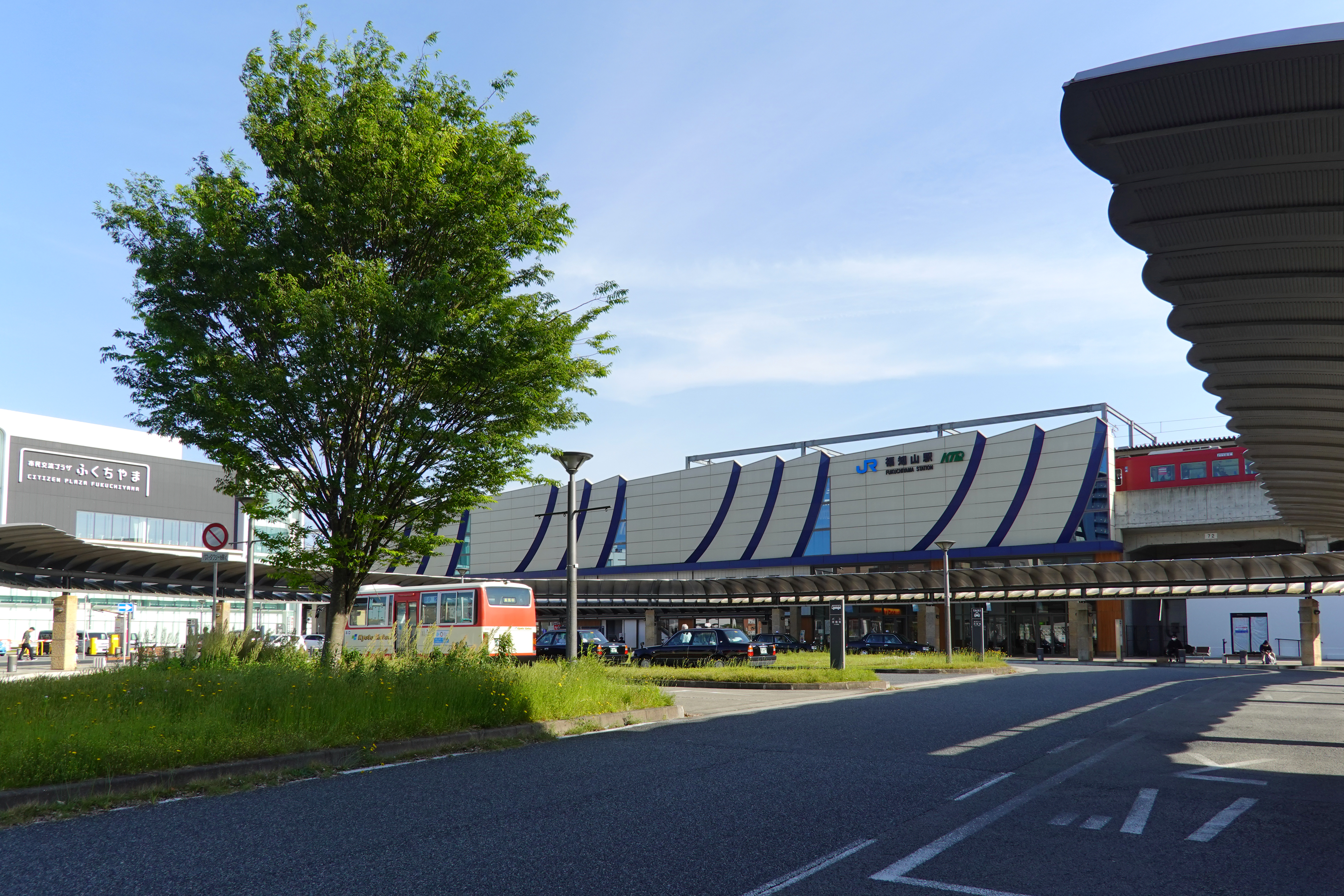
Fukuchiyama Station north exit in 2023

Fukuchiyama Station (福知山駅, Fukuchiyama-eki) is an interchange passenger railway station located in the city of Fukuchiyama, Kyoto Prefecture, Japan. It is jointly operated by the West Japan Railway Company (JR West) and the private railway company Willer Trains (Kyoto Tango Railway).

== Lines ==
Fukuchiyama Station is served by the San'in Main Line, and is located 88.5 kilometers (55.0 mi) from the terminus of the line at Kyōto. It is also the northern terminus of the Fukuchiyama Line, and is located 106.5 kilometers (66.2 mi) from the southern terminus of the line at Amagasaki. It is also the terminus for the 30.4-kilometer (18.9 mi) private Miyafuku Line to Miyazu.

== Layout ==
The JR station consists of an elevated side platform and two elevated island platforms serving five tracks, with the station building underneath. The JR portion of the station has a Midori no Madoguchi staffed ticket office. The Kyoto Tango Railway portion has an island platform serving two tracks. The station is one of the 15 staffed stations operated by KTR. Limited express trains named "Tango Relay" arrive at and depart from the platform for the KTR Line.

=== Platforms ===
| 1, 2 | ■ San'in Line | for Ayabe, Nishi-Maizuru, and Kyoto (local trains, limited express trains "Kinosaki") for Wadayama, Toyooka, and Kinosaki-Onsen (part of local trains) |
| 1, 2 | ■ San'in Line | for Wadayama, Toyooka, and Kinosaki-Onsen (part of local trains) |
| 1, 2 | ■ Fukuchiyama Line | for Sasayamaguchi, Takarazuka, and Osaka (mainly limited express trains "Kounotori") |
| 3, 4 | ■ San'in Line | for Wadayama, Toyooka, and Kinosaki-Onsen (local trains, limited express trains ("Kounotori", "Kinosaki")) |
| 3, 4 | ■ Fukuchiyama Line | for Sasayamaguchi, Takarazuka, and Osaka (local trains, Tambaji rapid services, part of limited express trains "Kounotori") |
| 3, 4 | ■ KTR Miyafuku Line | from the JR West Sanin Line for Ōe, Miyazu, and Amanohashidate (limited express trains "Hashidate") |
| 5 | ■ Fukuchiyama Line | for Sasayamaguchi, Takarazuka, and Osaka (local trains, Tambaji rapid services) |

| 1, 2 | ■ KTR Miyafuku Line | for Ōe, Miyazu, and Amanohashidate (local trains, rapid trains "Ōeyama") (limited express trains "Tango Relay") |

== Adjacent stations ==
| « | Service | » |
West Japan Railway Company (JR West)
San'in Main Line
| Isa | Local | Kamikawaguchi |
| Isa | Rapid service (Sonobe, Higashi-Maizuru—Fukuchiyama) | Terminus |
| Terminus | Rapid service (Fukuchiyama—Kinosaki Onsen) | Kamikawaguchi |
| Ayabe | Limited Express Kinosaki | Wadayama |
| Through to Fukuchiyama Line | Limited Express Kounotori | Wadayama |
Fukuchiyama Line
| Tamba-Takeda | Local; Tambaji Rapid service | Terminus |
| Kuroi | Limited Express Kounotori | Through to San'in Line |
Kyoto Tango Railway
Miyafuku Line
| Terminus | Local (including "Tango Aomatsu" 3, 4) | Fukuchiyama-shimin-byōin-guchi |
| Terminus | Rapid "Ōeyama" | Fukuchiyama-shimin-byōin-guchi (1, 2, 3, 7); Aragakashinokidai (4, 5, 6) |
| Terminus | Rapid "Tango Aomatsu" 1, 2 | Aragakashinokidai ("Tango Aomatsu" 2); Ōe ("Tango Aomatsu" 1) |
| Sanin Line | Limited express "Hashidate" | Ōe |
| Terminus | Limited express "Tango Relay" | Ōe |

== Bus routes ==
West JR Bus, Kyoto Kotsu, Tango Kairiku Kostu, Osaka Bus and so on are operated.

=== North Exit ===
Route buses
| Operator | Destination | Route | Note |
|---|---|---|---|
| West JR Bus | Sonobe Station | Empuku Line | Passengers who have valid Japan Rail Pass are able to ride on this bus route at free. |
| Kyoto Kotsu | Ayabe Station | Fukuchiyama Line | |
| Kyoto Kotsu | High Techno Academy | Nagatano Line | |
| Kyoto Kotsu | Yamanoguchi (Sandanike Park) | Kawakita Line (Sandanike Line) | |
| Kyoto Kotsu | Narumi High school | Hori Circular-route Line | |
| Kyoto Kotsu | Iwama Kaikanmae | Iwama Line; Iwama Circular-route Line | |
| Kyoto Kotsu | Komaki | Komaki Line | |
| Kyoto Kotsu | Shimo-Yakuno Station | Yakuno Line | |
| Kyoto Kotsu | Chisui Kinenkanmae | MachinakaCircular-route Line | |
| Tango Kairiku Kotsu | Amanohashidate | Yosa・Fukuchiyama Line | |
| Tango Kairiku Kotsu | Kyoei High school | Yosa・Fukuchiyama Line | |

- Following buses operated by Fukuchiyama City Community bus.

| Route | Destination | Note |
|---|---|---|
| Nakaroku-Tobe Bus | Tano Yamada Kominkan | |
| Anga Bus | Hazumaki | |
| Mitake Bus | Kami-Sasaki | |

=== South Exit ===
Highway buses
| Operator | NO | Destination | Note |
|---|---|---|---|
| Nihon Kotsu | Kobe - Fukuchiyama Line | Sannomiya Station | |
| Nihon Kotsu | Osaka - Fukuchiyama Line | Osaka International Airport・Namba Station | |
| Osaka Bus | Fukuchiyama Limited Express New Star | Osaka Station・Universal Studios Japan | |
| New Prince Highway Bus | Willer Express | Tokyo Station・Osaki Station / Kinosakionsen Station | |

== History ==
Fukuchiyama Station opened on November 3, 1904. With the privatization of the Japan National Railways (JNR) on April 1, 1987, the station came under the aegis of the West Japan Railway Company.

== Passenger statistics ==
In fiscal 2016, the JR West portion of the station was used by an average of 3,783 passengers daily. The KTR station was used by 1033 passengers during the same period.

== Surrounding area ==
- Fukuchiyama Castle
- Fukuchiyama City Hall

== See also ==
- List of railway stations in Japan
