= Hashidate =

Japanese limited express train service

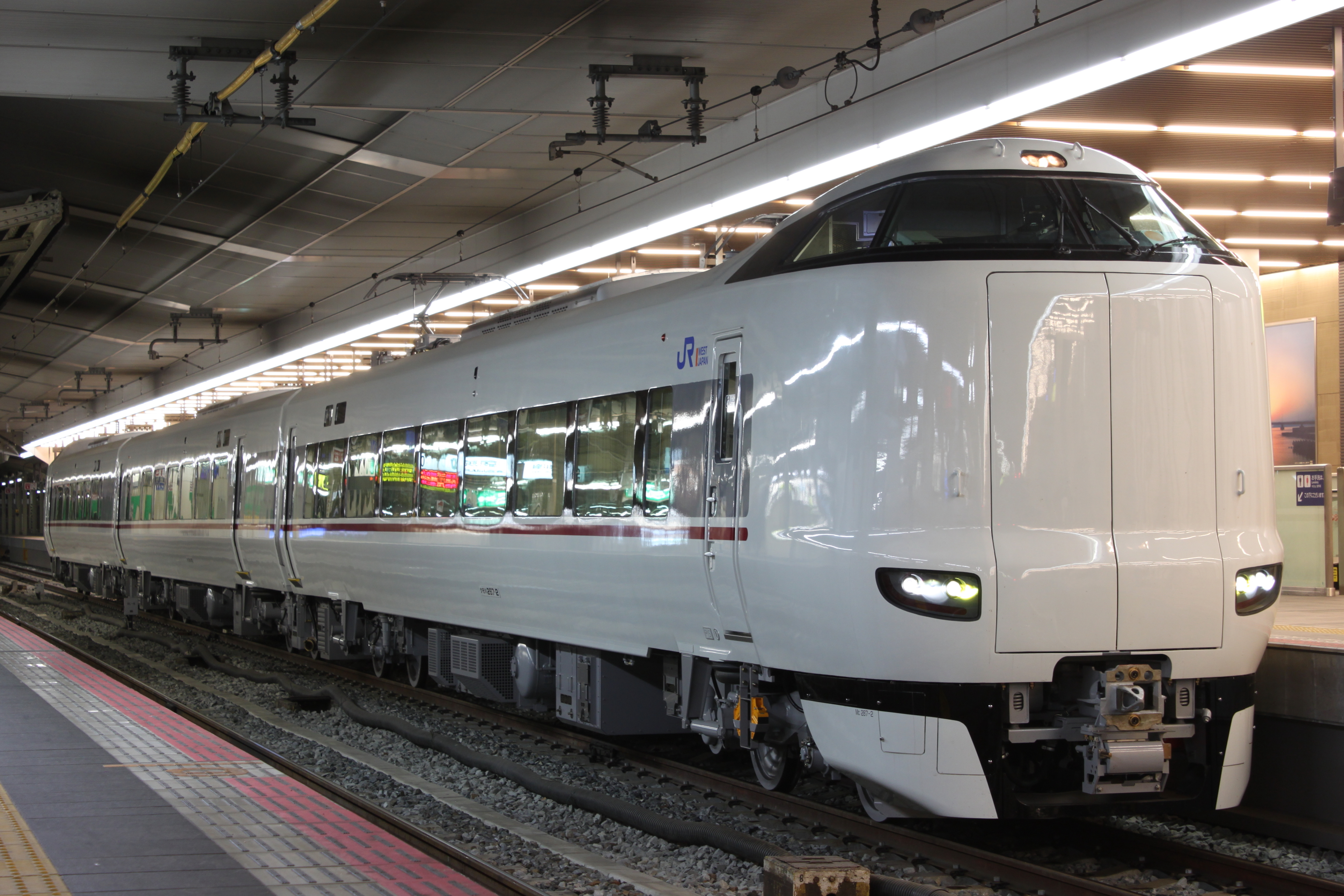
- 287 series EMU, January 2011

Overview
- Service type: Limited express
- First service: 1965
- Current operator(s): JR West, Willer Trains

Route
- Line(s) used: Sanin Main Line

Technical
- Rolling stock: 287 series EMU, Willer Trains KTR8000 series DMU

The Hashidate (はしだて) is a limited express train service operated by West Japan Railway Company (JR West) in Japan. One of the services making up JR West's "Kitakinki Big X Network" in northern Kansai, it connects Kyoto Station, Amanohashidate Station and Toyooka Station via the Sanin Main Line and Kyoto Tango Railway's Miyafuku Line and Miyatoyo (Miyazu) Line. The color associated with the service is red.

== Stops ==
Trains stop at the following stations:

Kyōto - Nijō - Kameoka - Sonobe - Ayabe - Fukuchiyama - Ōe - Miyazu - Amanohashidate - Nodagawa - Tango-Ōmiya - Mineyama - Amino - Yūhigaura-Kitsu-onsen - Kumihama - Toyooka

== Rolling stock ==
- 287 series EMUs
- 289 series EMUs (from 31 October 2015, end at 25 March 2016)
- KTR8000 series DMUs

Services are operated by 287 series electric multiple unit (EMU) trains based at Fukuchiyama Depot, and KTR8000 series DMUs from Willer Trains. 289 series EMUs converted from former dual-voltage 683 series trainsets were introduced on Hashidate services from 31 October 2015, replacing the remaining JNR-era 381 series trains. After the resetting of the rolling stock in 26 March 2016, all 289 series EMUs were changed to 287 series EMUs.

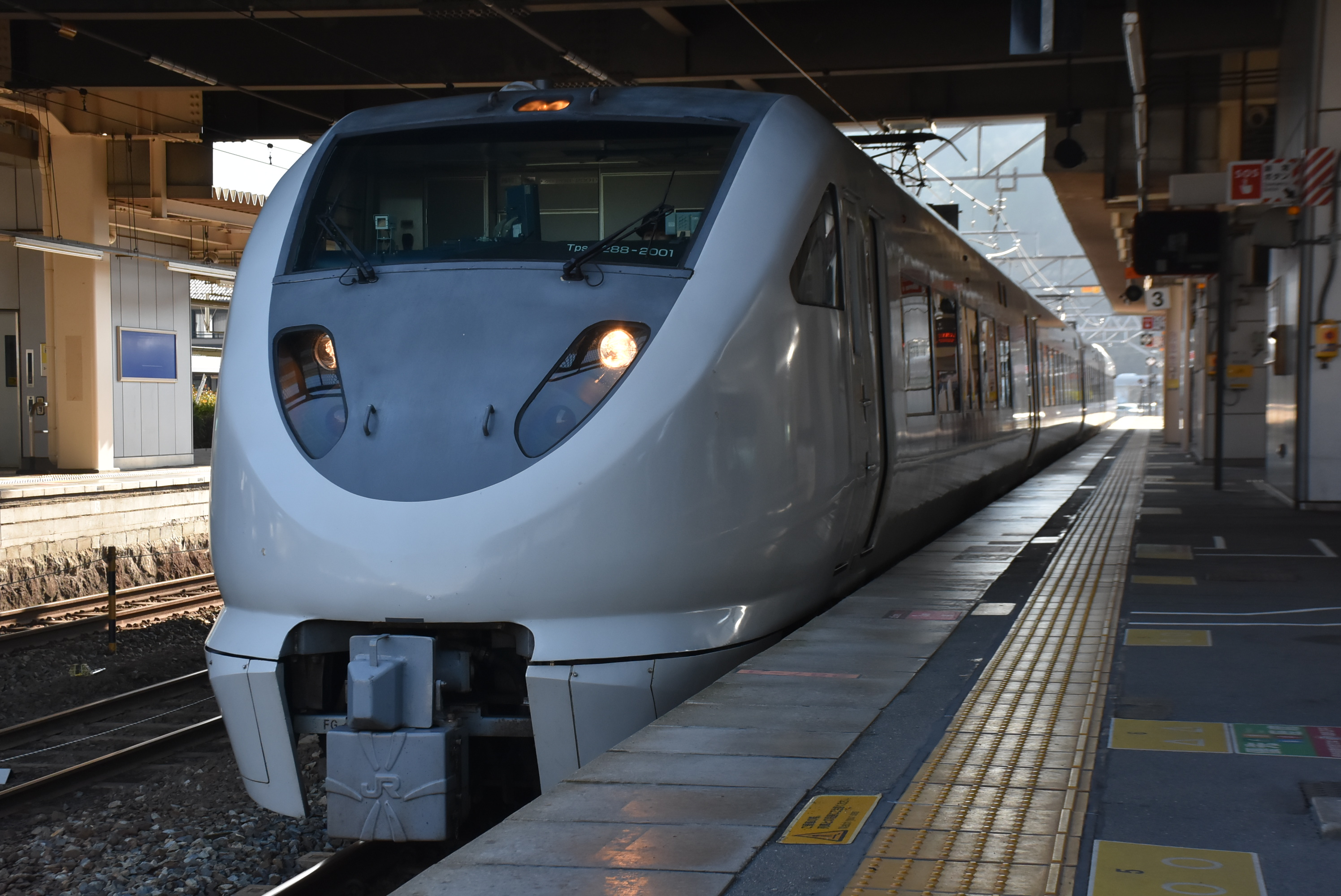
289 series EMU, January 2016

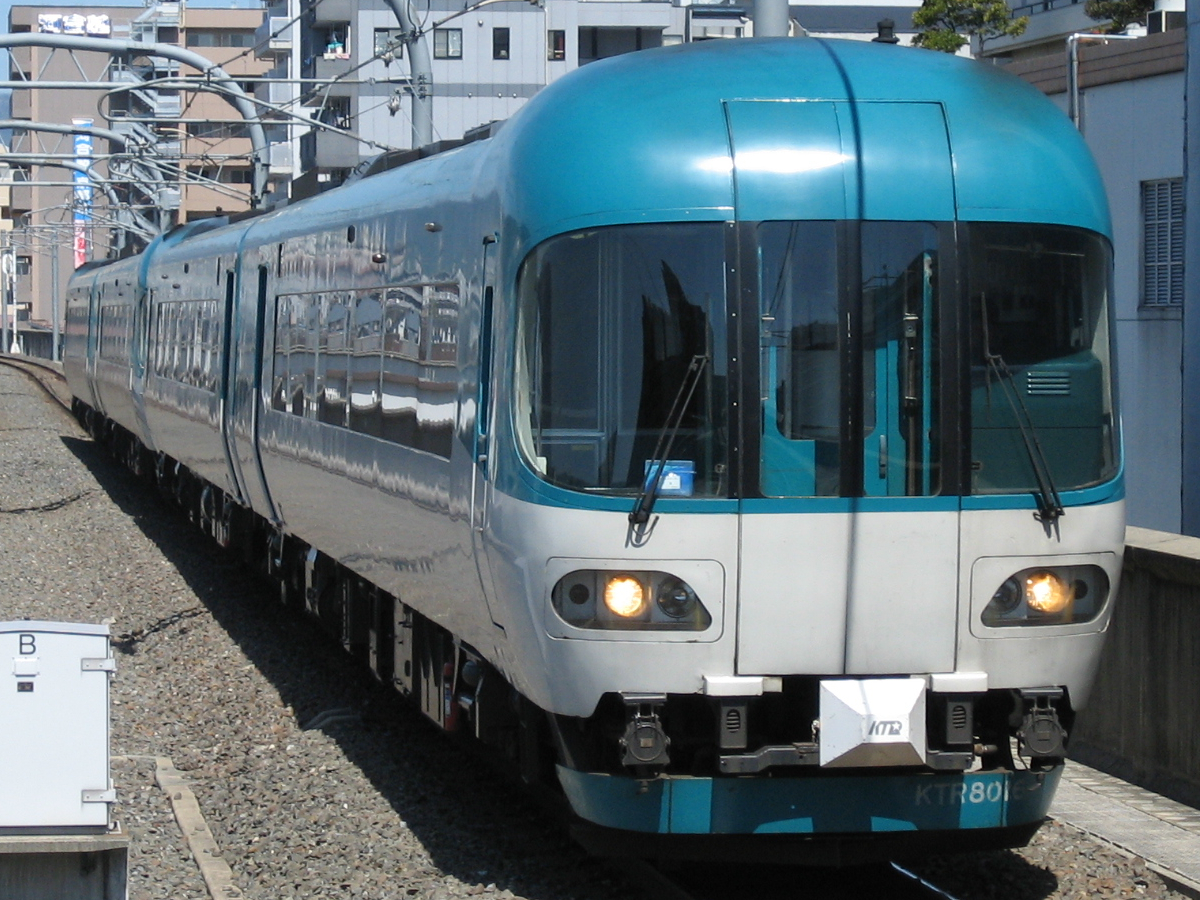
KTR8000 series DMU, March 2006

=== Former ===
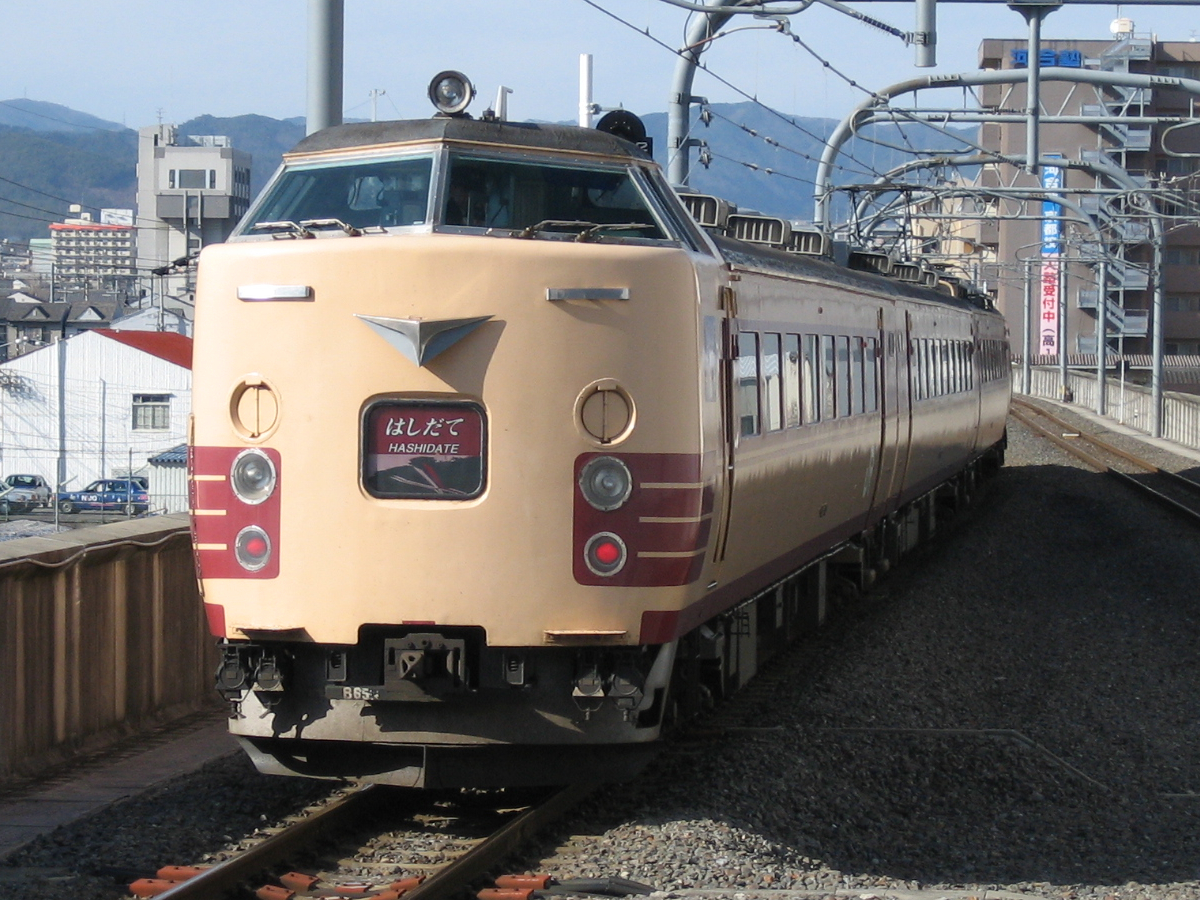
A 183 series train on a Hashidate service departing Nijō Station, March 2006

- 183 series EMUs (until 15 March 2013)
- 381 series EMUs (until 30 October 2015)

183 series EMUs were formerly used on some services, but were withdrawn by the start of the revised timetable on 16 March 2013.

381 series EMUs used on Hashidate services were withdrawn following the final day of operations on 30 October 2015.

== History ==
The Hashidate first appeared in 1965 as a semi-express connecting Osaka and Amanohashidate via the Fukuchiyama Line, Sanin Main Line, and Miyazu Line. It became an express service in 1966. In 1968, Hashidate services were merged into Tamba services. Until March 11, 2011, the Monju and Tango Discovery were most like the original Hashidate service. From 1982 until 1992, the Hashidate was an express service connecting Fukui and Amanohashidate via the Obama Line and Miyazu Line. Two other services, the Wakasa and Taisha, had service areas that overlapped with the Hashidate.

- March 1, 1961: The Wakasa begins service as a semi-express connecting Nishi-Maizuru and Kanazawa.
- April 20, 1963: One daily round trip is added, service is extended to Fukui.
- October 1, 1964: One daily round trip is discontinued. However, until the beginning of express Asashio service between Kanazawa and Izumo-shi on 1 December, the Wakasa operates as a temporary service.
- March 5, 1966: The Wakasa becomes an express service.
- October 1, 1966: The Taisha express service begins linking Nagoya, Tsuruga, and Izumo-shi. It connects with the Asashio between Tsuruga and Yonago.
- July 1968: The Emerald express service begins, linking Nagoya and Higashi-Maizuru. Intended as a complement to the Taisha, it is introduced to ease crowding during the summer. After the Taisha service is discontinued, the Emerald continues to operate during summers until 1995.
- October 1, 1968: Asashio services are renamed Taisha. Taisha service is modified to Nagoya and Kanazawa with Izumo-shi.
- October 1, 1970: One round-trip Wakasa service is added.
- March 15, 1972: Wakasa begins operation on the Maizuru Line and Sanin Main Line. One round trip services Kyoto.
- October 2, 1978: Taisha consists to and from Kanazawa now connect Fukui and Amanohashidate.
- July 1, 1982: Taisha consists to and from Nagoya now connect Nagoya and Amanohashidate.
- November 15, 1982: Taisha service to Nagoya stops. The service is renamed Hashidate.
- November 1, 1986: Prior to the privatization of JNR, Wakasa service is reduced to one round trip daily.
- March 13, 1992: Hashidate service is discontinued.
- 1996 - Following the electrification of the Sanin Main Line, Hashidate service is reintroduced using electric trains.
- March 16, 1996: Wakasa service is modified to connect Higashi-Maizuru and Tsuruga.
- October 10, 1999: Wakasa service is discontinued.
- March 18, 2007: All services become non-smoking.
- March 12, 2011: Tango Discovery services are united to Hashidate services.
- March 16, 2013: From the start of the revised timetable, 183 series EMUs are withdrawn from Hashidate services.
