= Shōtenkyō Station =

Railway station in Kyōtango, Kyoto Prefecture, Japan

Shōtenkyō Station 小天橋駅
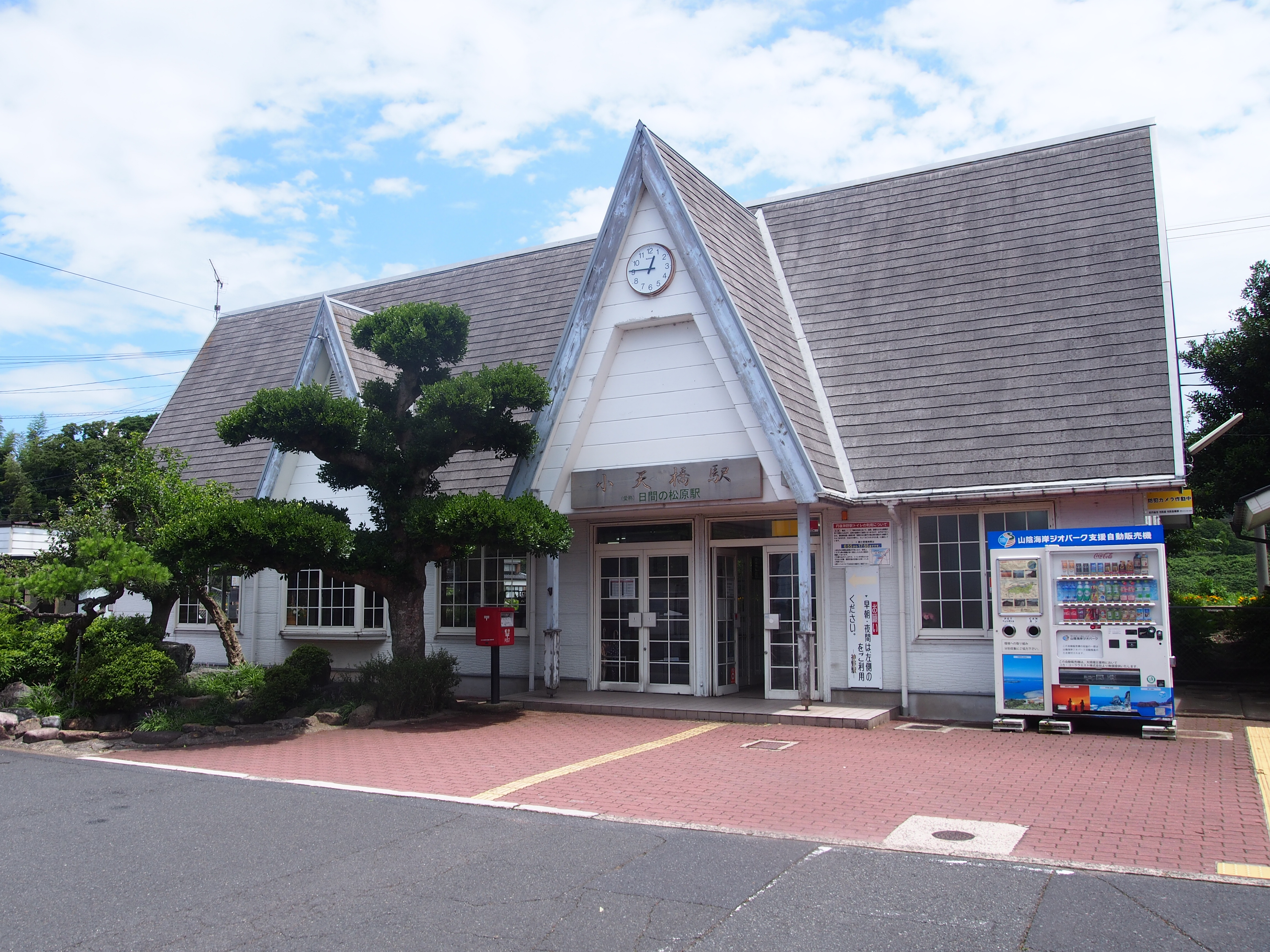
- Shōtenkyō Station, July 2019

General information
- Location: Kumihama-cho Urake, Kyōtango-shi, Kyoto-fu 629-3438; Japan
- Coordinates: 35°37′49.88″N 134°55′43.38″E
- Operator: Kyoto Tango Railway
- Line: ■ Miyazu Line
- Distance: 66.5 km from Nishi-Maizuru
- Platforms: 2 side platforms
- Connections: Bus stop

Other information
- Station code: T22
- Website: Official website

History
- Opened: 10 August 1932

Passengers
- FY2018: 66 daily
Location
- Location within Kyoto Prefecture Location within Japan

Shōtenkyō Station (小天橋駅, Shōtenkyō-eki) is a passenger railway station located in the city of Kyōtango, Kyoto Prefecture, Japan, operated by the private railway company Willer Trains (Kyoto Tango Railway).

== Lines ==
Shōtenkyō Station is a station of the Miyazu Line, and is located 66.5 kilometers from the terminus of the line at Nishi-Maizuru Station.

== Station layout ==
The station has two opposed ground-level side platforms connected to the station building by a level crossing. The station is attended.

=== Platforms ===
1	■ Miyazu Line	for Kumihama, Toyooka
2	■ Miyazu Line	for Amino, Amanohashidate and Miyazu

== Adjacent stations ==
«	Service	»
Miyazu Line
Yūhigaura-Kitsu-onsen	Local	Kabutoyama
Limited express: Does not stop at this station

== History ==
The station opened on August 10, 1932 as Tango-Kanno Station (丹後神野駅, Tango-Kanno-eki) and was renamed to the present name on April 1, 2015.

== Passenger statistics ==
In fiscal 2018, the station was used by an average of 66 passengers daily.

== Surrounding area ==
- Roadside Station Kumihama SANKAIKAN
- Japan National Route 178

== See also ==
- List of railway stations in Japan
