= Kyōtango-Ōmiya Station =

Railway station in Kyōtango, Kyoto Prefecture, Japan

Kyōtango-Ōmiya Station 京丹後大宮駅
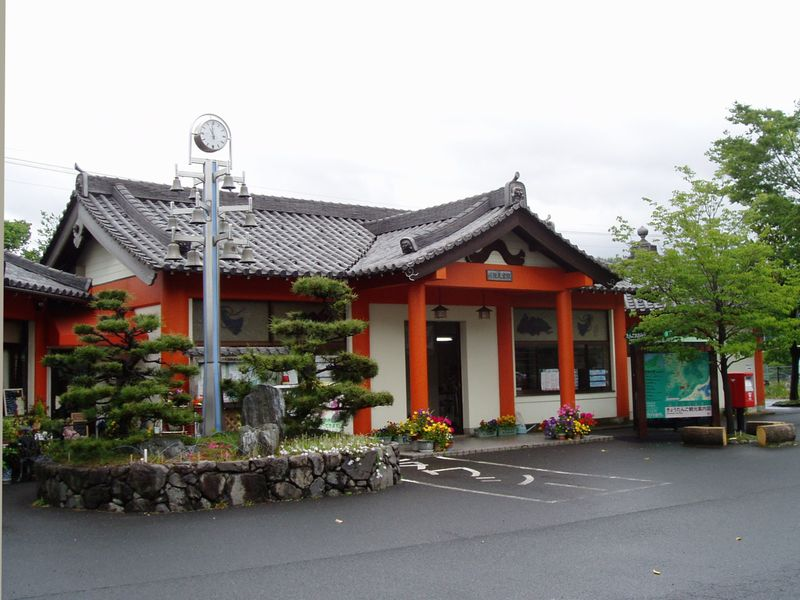
- Kyōtango-Ōmiya Station, May 2007

General information
- Location: Ōmiya-chō Kuchiōno, Kyōtango-shi, Kyoto-fu 629-2501; Japan
- Coordinates: 35.5793°N 135.0941°E
- Operator: Kyoto Tango Railway
- Line: ■ Miyazu Line
- Distance: 42.7 km from Nishi-Maizuru
- Platforms: 2 side platforms
- Connections: Bus stop

Other information
- Status: Unstaffed
- Station code: T18
- Website: Official website

History
- Opened: 3 November 1925
- Former names: Kuchiōno (to 1963); Tango-Ōmiya (to 2015)

Passengers
- FY2018: 82 daily
Location
- Location within Kyoto Prefecture Location within Japan

Kyōtango-Ōmiya Station (京丹後大宮駅, Kyōtango-Ōmiya-eki) is a passenger railway station in located in the city of Kyōtango, Kyoto Prefecture, Japan, operated by the private railway company Willer Trains (Kyoto Tango Railway).

== Lines ==
Kyōtango-Ōmiya Station is a station of the Miyazu Line, and is located 42.7 kilometers from the terminus of the line at Nishi-Maizuru Station.

== Station layout ==
The station has two opposed ground-level side platforms connected to the station building by a level crossing. The station is unattended.

=== Platforms ===
1	■ Miyazu Line	for Amino, Kumihama and Toyooka
2	■ Miyazu Line	for Amanohashidate and Miyazu

== Adjacent stations ==
«	Service	»
Miyazu Line
Yosano	Local	Mineyama
Yosano	Limited express "Hashidate", "Tango Relay"	Mineyama

== History ==
The station was opened on November 3, 1925 as Kuchiōno Station (口大野駅, Kuchiōno-eki). On May 24, 1963 it was renamed Tango-Ōmiya Station (丹後大宮駅, Tango-Ōmiya-eki) , and renamed again to its present name on March 31, 2015.

== Passenger statistics ==
In fiscal 2018, the station was used by an average of 140 passengers daily.

== Surrounding area ==
- Kyotango City Omiya Government Building
- JA Kyoto Omiya Branch
- Ono Castle Ruins

== See also ==
- List of railway stations in Japan
