= Tango-Yura Station =

Railway station in Miyazu, Kyoto Prefecture, Japan

Tango-Yura Station 丹後由良駅
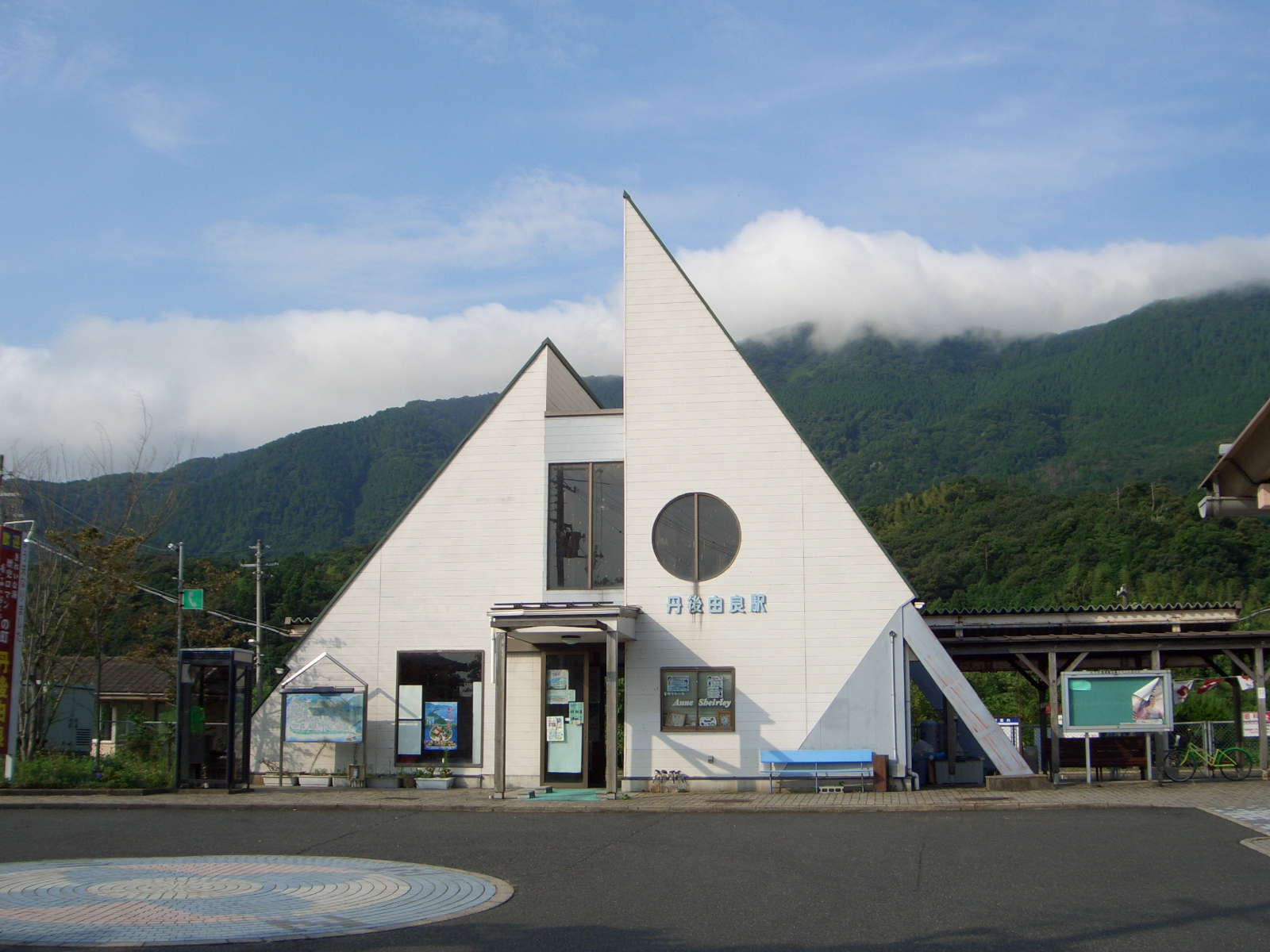
- Tango-Yura Station, August 2008

General information
- Location: Yura, Miyazu-shi, Kyoto-fu 626-0071; Japan
- Coordinates: 35.5159°N 135.2796°E
- Operator: Kyoto Tango Railway
- Line: ■ Miyazu Line
- Distance: 14.4 km from Nishi-Maizuru
- Platforms: 2 side platforms
- Connections: Bus stop

Other information
- Status: Staffed
- Station code: M12
- Website: Official website

History
- Opened: 12 April 1924

Passengers
- FY2019: 55 daily
Location
- Location within Kyoto Prefecture Location within Japan

Tango-Yura Station (丹後由良駅, Tango-Yura-eki) is a passenger railway station in located in the city of Miyazu, Kyoto Prefecture, Japan, operated by the private railway company Willer Trains (Kyoto Tango Railway).

== Lines ==
Tango-Yura Station is a station of the Miyazu Line and is located 14.4 kilometers from the terminus of the line at the Nishi-Maizuru Station.

== Station layout ==
The station consists of two opposed ground-level side platforms connected by a footbridge. The station is attended.

=== Platforms ===
1	■ Miyazu Line	for Amanohashidate, Mineyama and Kumihama
2	■ Miyazu Line	for Nishi-Maizuru

== Adjacent stations ==
«	Service	»
Miyazu Line
Tango-Kanzaki	Local	Kunda

== History ==
The station was opened on April 12, 1924.

== Passenger statistics ==
In fiscal 2019, the station was used by an average of 55 passengers daily.

== Surrounding area ==
- Japan National Route 178
- Yura Shrine
- Tango Yura Beach
- Anju no Sato Momiji Park

== See also ==
- List of railway stations in Japan
