= Shinonome Station (Kyoto) =

Railway station in Maizuru, Kyoto Prefecture, Japan

Shinonome Station 東雲駅
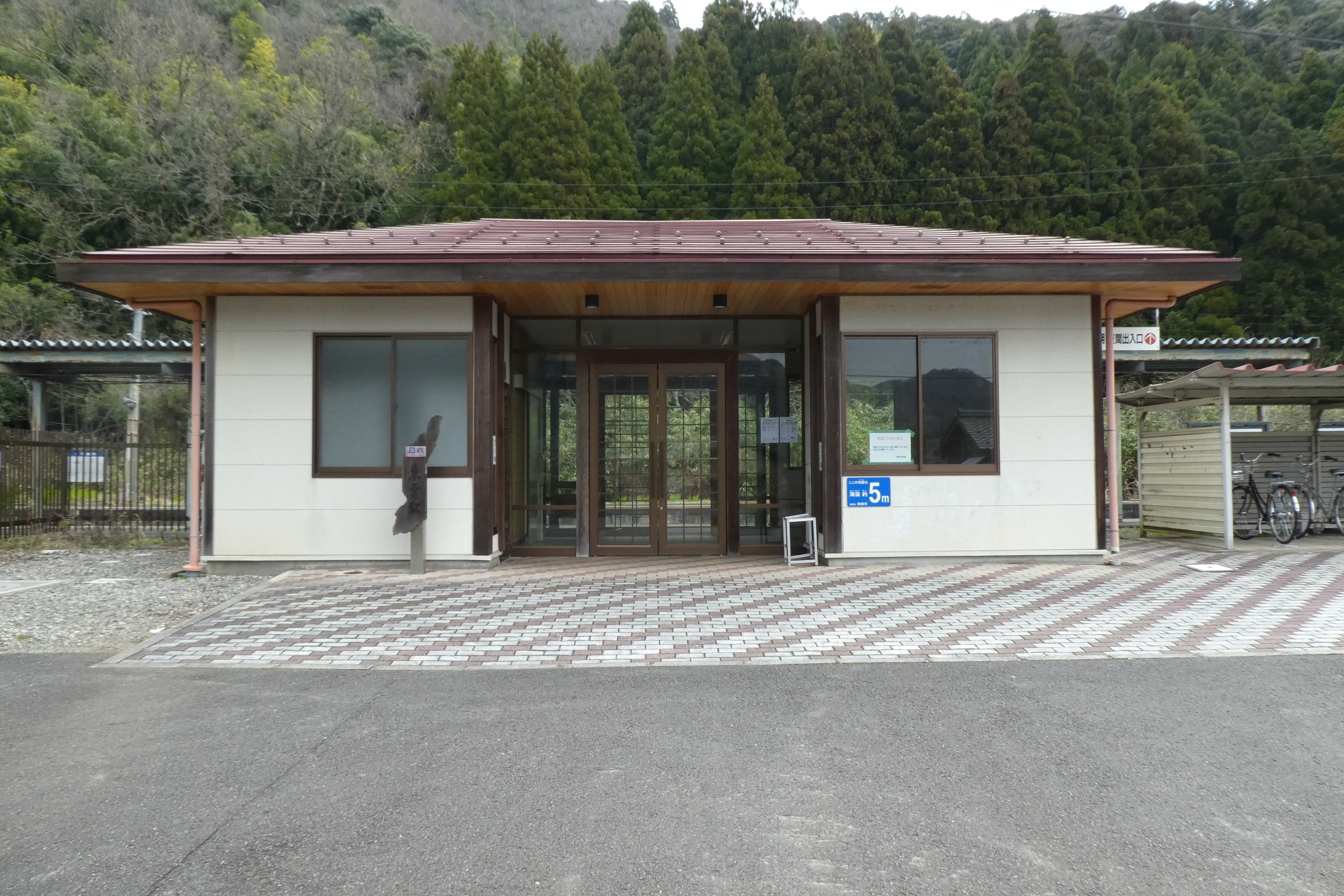
- Shinonome Station, February 2020

General information
- Location: Mizuma, Maizuru-shi, Kyoto-fu 624-0965; Japan
- Coordinates: 35°28′30″N 135°17′06″E
- Operator: Kyoto Tango Railway
- Line: ■ Miyazu Line
- Distance: 8.9 km from Nishi-Maizuru
- Platforms: 2 side platforms
- Connections: Bus stop

Other information
- Status: Unstaffed
- Station code: M10
- Website: Official website

History
- Opened: 12 April 1924

Passengers
- FY2019: 14 daily
Location
- Location within Kyoto Prefecture Location within Japan

Shinonome Station (東雲駅, Shinonome-eki) is a passenger railway station in located in the city of Maizuru, Kyoto Prefecture, Japan, operated by the private railway company Willer Trains (Kyoto Tango Railway).

== Lines ==
Shinonome Station is a station of the Miyazu Line, and is located 8.9 kilometers from the terminus of the line at Nishi-Maizuru Station.

== Station layout ==
The station consists of two opposed ground-level side platforms connected by a level crossing. The station is unattended.

=== Platforms ===
1	■ Miyazu Line	for Miyazu, Amanohashidate and Mineyama
2	■ Miyazu Line	for Nishi-Maizuru

== Adjacent stations ==
«	Service	»
Miyazu Line
Shisho	Local	Tango-Kanzaki

== History ==
The station was opened on April 12, 1924.

== Passenger statistics ==
In fiscal 2019, the station was used by an average of 14 passengers daily.

== Surrounding area ==
- Yura River

== See also ==
- List of railway stations in Japan
