= Yosano Station =

Railway station in Yosano, Kyoto Prefecture, Japan

Yosano Station 与謝野駅
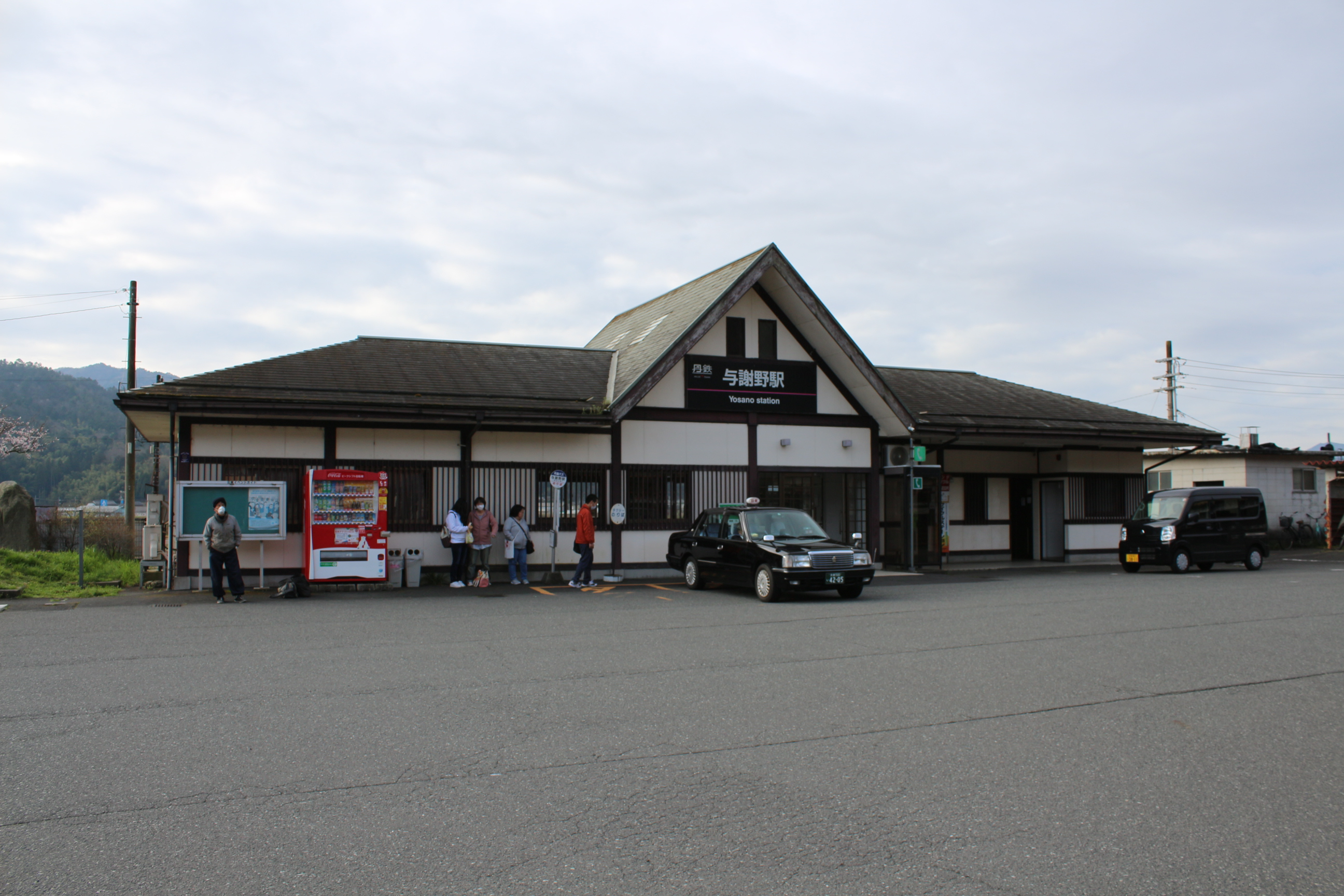
- Yosano Station, March 2020

General information
- Location: Shimoyamada, Yosano, Yoza-gun, Kyoto^fu 629-2302; Japan
- Coordinates: 35.5434°N 135.1254°E
- Operator: Kyoto Tango Railway
- Line: ■ Miyazu Line
- Distance: 35.7 km from Nishi-Maizuru
- Platforms: 1 side + 1 island platform
- Connections: Bus stop

Other information
- Status: Staffed
- Station code: T17
- Website: Official website

History
- Opened: 31 July 1925
- Former names: Tango-Yamada (to 1990); Nodagawa (to 2015)

Passengers
- FY2019: 222 daily
Location
- Location within Kyoto Prefecture Location within Japan

Yosano Station (与謝野駅, Yosano-eki) is a passenger railway station in located in the town of Yosano, Kyoto Prefecture, Japan, operated by the private railway company Willer Trains (Kyoto Tango Railway).

== Lines ==
Yosano Station is a station of the Miyazu Line, and is located 35.7 kilometers from the terminus of the line at Nishi-Maizuru Station.

== Station layout ==
The station has one ground-level side platform and one ground-level island platform connected to the station building by a level crossing. The station is staffed. The station building is characterized by a roof shaped like a kimono collar, which is associated with the production area of Tango chirimen, a type crepe fabric which is a local speciality.

=== Platforms ===
1	■ Miyazu Line	for Amanohashidate and Miyazu
2	■ Miyazu Line	for Amino and Kumihama
3	■ Miyazu Line	for Amanohashidate and Miyazu

== Adjacent stations ==
«	Service	»
Miyazu Line
Iwatakiguchi	Local	Kyōtango-Ōmiya
Amanohashidate	Limited express "Hashidate", "Tango Relay"	Kyōtango-Ōmiya

== History ==
The station was opened on July 31, 1925 as Tango-Yamada Station (丹後山田駅, Tango-Yamada-eki). On March 31, 1990 it was renamed Nodagawa Station (野田川駅, Nodagawa-eki) , and renamed again to its present name on March 31, 2015.

== Passenger statistics ==
In fiscal 2019, the station was used by an average of 222 passengers daily.

== Surrounding area ==
- Nodagawa Forest Park, Kyoto Prefecture Nodagawa Youth Center
- Kyoto Prefectural Kaetsuya High School

== See also ==
- List of railway stations in Japan
