= Shisho Station =

Railway station in Maizuru, Kyoto Prefecture, Japan

Shisho Station 四所駅
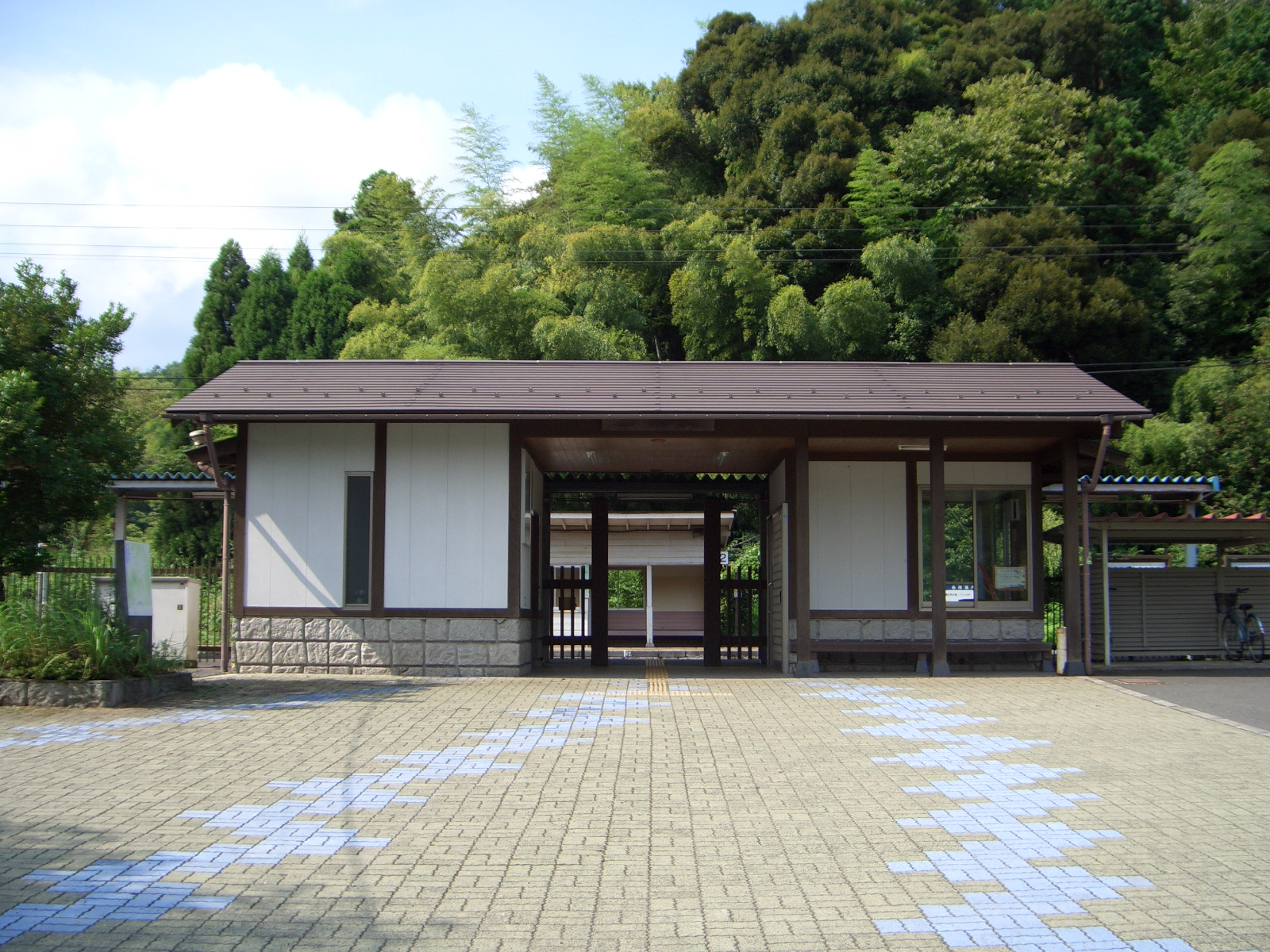
- Shosho Station, August 2008

General information
- Location: Kamifukui, Maizuru-shi, Kyoto-fu 624-0951; Japan
- Coordinates: 35.4464°N 135.2907°E
- Operator: Kyoto Tango Railway
- Line: ■ Miyazu Line
- Distance: 5.4 km from Nishi-Maizuru
- Platforms: 2 side platforms
- Connections: Bus stop

Other information
- Status: Unstaffed
- Station code: M9
- Website: Official website

History
- Opened: 12 April 1924

Passengers
- FY2019: 19 daily
Location
- Location within Kyoto Prefecture Location within Japan

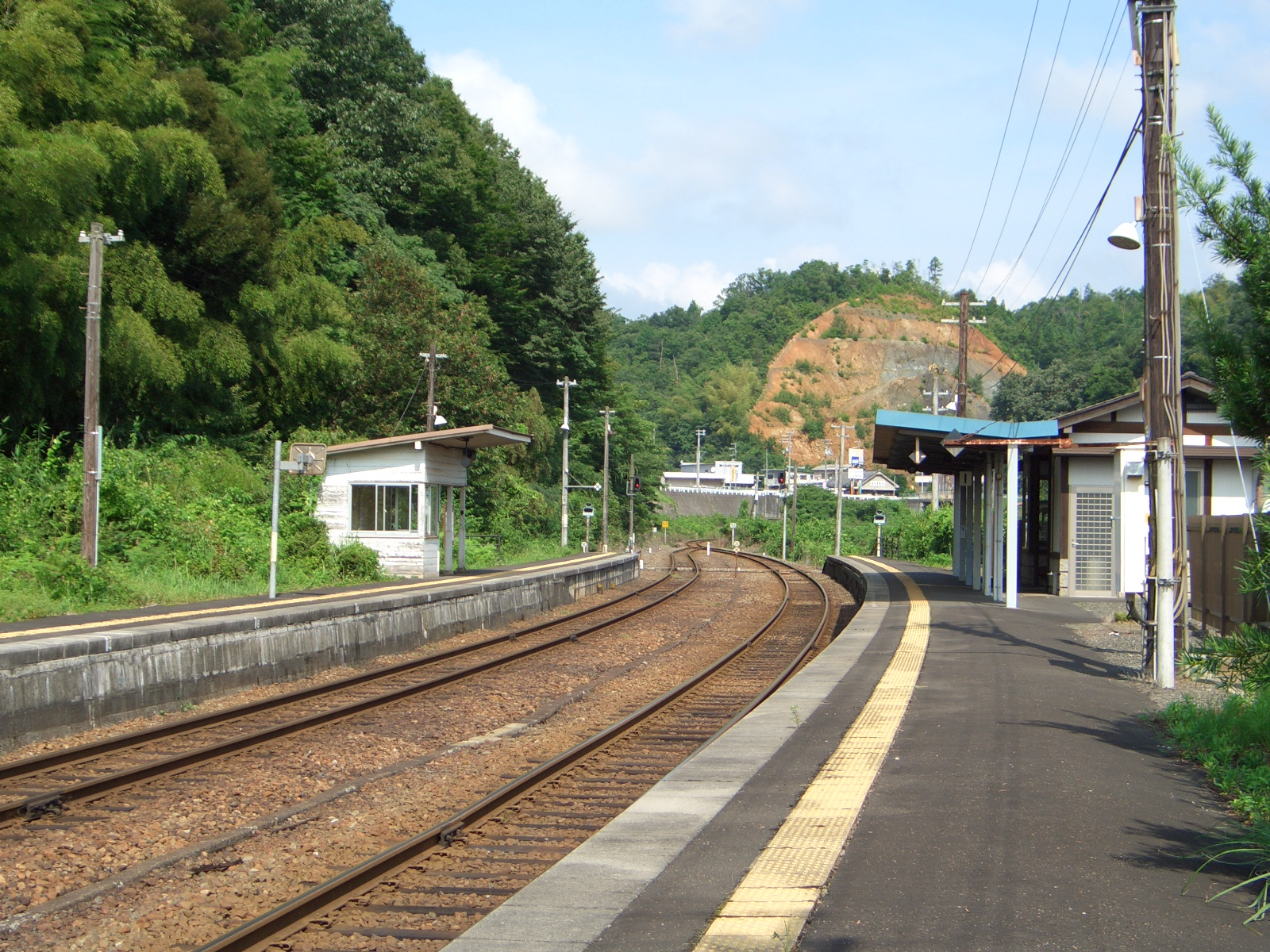
Platforms

Shisho Station (四所駅, Shisho-eki) is a passenger railway station in located in the city of Maizuru, Kyoto Prefecture, Japan, operated by the private railway company Willer Trains (Kyoto Tango Railway). The station has an alias Shisho Shidarezakura Kōen (四所しだれ桜公園).

== Lines ==
Shisho Station is a station of the Miyazu Line, and is located 5.4 kilometers from the terminus of the line at Nishi-Maizuru Station.

== Station layout ==
The station consists of two opposed ground-level side platforms connected by a level crossing. The station is unattended. The station building was modeled after the ancient checkpoint (sekisho) on the highway which was located nearby.

=== Platforms ===
1	■ Miyazu Line	for Miyazu, Amanohashidate and Mineyama
2	■ Miyazu Line	for Nishi-Maizuru

== Adjacent stations ==
«	Service	»
Miyazu Line
Nishi-Maizuru	Local	Shinonome

== History ==
The station was opened on April 12, 1924.

== Passenger statistics ==
In fiscal 2019, the station was used by an average of 19 passengers daily.

== Surrounding area ==
- Japan National Route 175

== See also ==
- List of railway stations in Japan
