= Kōnotori-no-sato Station =

Railway station in Toyooka, Hyōgo Prefecture, Japan

Kōnotori-no-sato Station コウノトリの郷駅
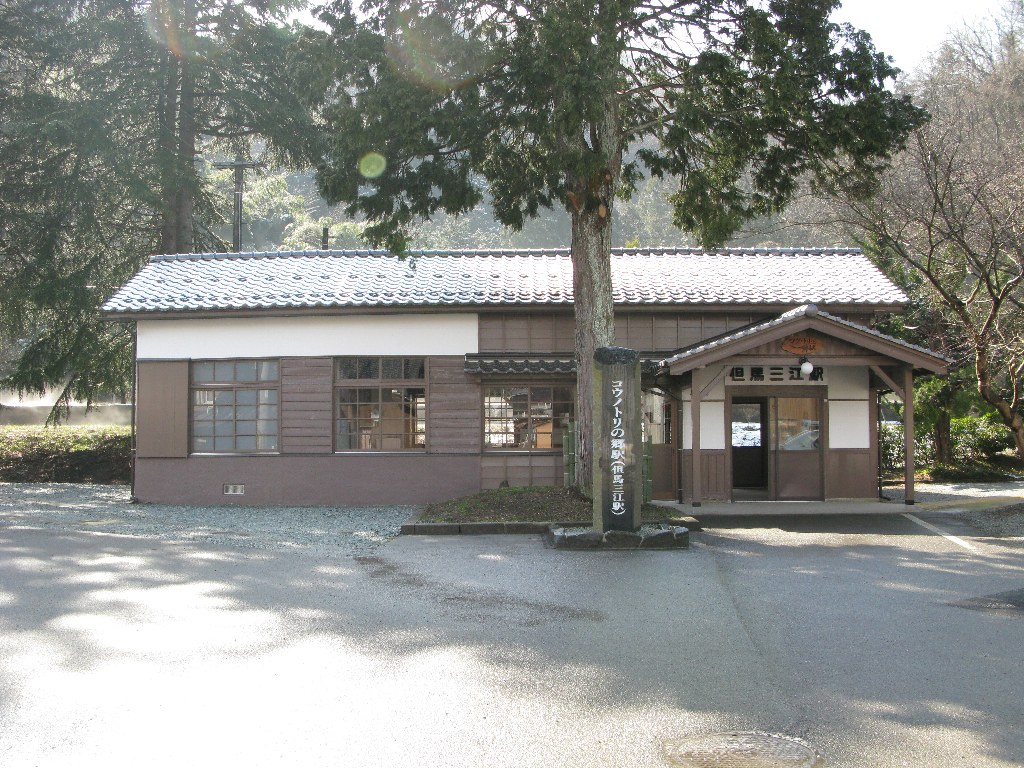
- Tajima-Mie Station, February 2010

General information
- Location: Hinado-cho, Toyooka-shi, Hyōgo-ken 668-0815; Japan
- Coordinates: 35.5526°N 134.8354°E
- Operator: Kyoto Tango Railway
- Line: ■ Miyazu Line
- Distance: 80.6 km from Nishi-Maizuru
- Platforms: 1 side platform
- Connections: Bus stop

Other information
- Station code: T25
- Website: Official website

History
- Opened: 15 December 1929
- Former names: Tajima-Mie (until 2015)

Passengers
- FY2019: 2 daily
Location
- Location within Hyōgo Prefecture Location within Japan

Kōnotori-no-sato Station (コウノトリの郷駅, Kōnotori-no-sato-eki) is a passenger railway station in located in the city of Toyooka, Hyōgo Prefecture, Japan, operated by the private railway company Willer Trains (Kyoto Tango Railway).

== Lines ==
Kōnotori-no-sato Station is a station of the Miyazu Line, and is located 80.6 kilometers from the terminus of the line at Nishi-Maizuru Station.

== Station layout ==
The station consists of one ground-level side platform serving a single bi-directional line. The station is unattended.

== Adjacent stations ==
«	Service	»
Miyazu Line
Kumihama	Local	Toyooka
Rapid: Does not stop at this station
Limited express "Tango Relay": Does not stop at this station

== History ==
The station was opened on December 15, 1929, as Tajima-Mie Station (但馬三江駅, Tajima-Mie-eki). The station name was changed on April 1, 2015.

== Passenger statistics ==
In fiscal 2019, the station was used by an average of 2 passengers daily.

== Surrounding area ==
- Japan National Route 178
- Japan National Route 312
- Hyogo Prefectural Homeland for the Oriental white Stork (28-minute walk)
- Kukuhi Shrine
- Genbudo

== See also ==
- List of railway stations in Japan
