= Kabutoyama Station =

Railway station in Kyōtango, Kyoto Prefecture, Japan

Kabutoyama Station かぶと山駅
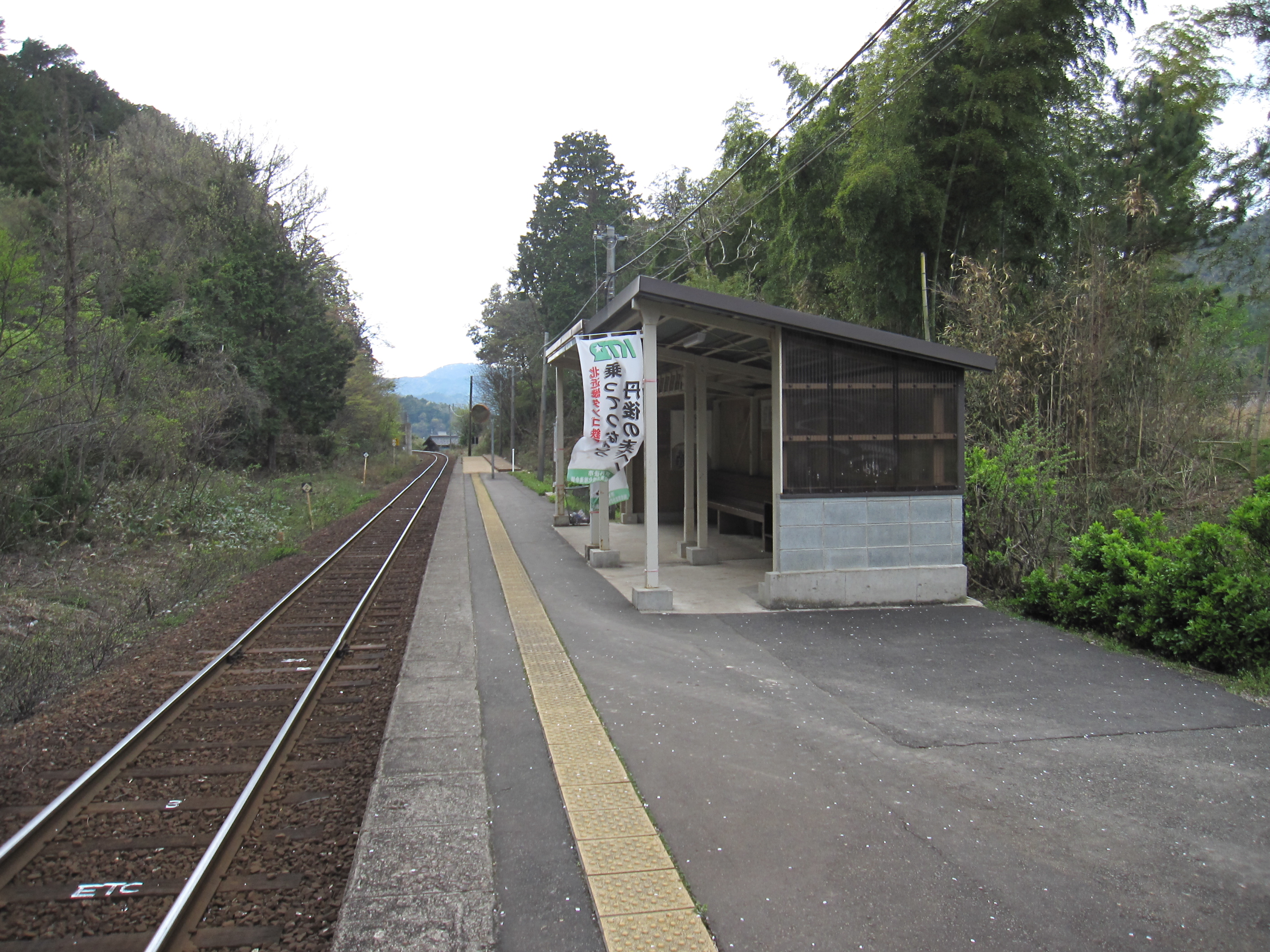
- Kabutoyama Station, April 2012

General information
- Location: Kumihamachō Kōyama, Kyōtango-shi, Kyoto^fu 629-3442; Japan
- Coordinates: 35.6069°N 134.9199°E
- Operator: Kyoto Tango Railway
- Line: ■ Miyazu Line
- Distance: 69.7 km from Nishi-Maizuru
- Platforms: 1 side platform
- Connections: Bus stop

Other information
- Station code: T23
- Website: Official website

History
- Opened: 15 December 1929
- Former names: Kōyama Station (to 2015)

Passengers
- FY2018: 71 daily
Location
- Location within Kyoto Prefecture Location within Japan

Kabutoyama Station (かぶと山駅, Kabutoyama-eki) is a passenger railway station in located in the city of Kyōtango, Kyoto Prefecture, Japan, operated by the private railway company Willer Trains (Kyoto Tango Railway).

== Lines ==
Kabutoyama Station is a station of the Miyazu Line, and is located 69.7 kilometers from the terminus of the line at Nishi-Maizuru Station.

== Station layout ==
The station has one ground-level side platform serving a single bi-directional track. The station is unattended.This is the only station on the Miyazu Line that has no station building except for the shelter on the platform.

== Adjacent stations ==
«	Service	»
Miyazu Line
Shōtenkyō	Local	Kumihama
Limited express "Hashidate", "Tango Relay": Does not stop at this station

== History ==
The station was opened on March 1, 1962 as Kōyama Station (甲山駅, Kōyama-eki) and was renamed to the present name on April 1, 2015.

== Passenger statistics ==
In fiscal 2018, the station was used by an average of 71 passengers daily.

== Surrounding area ==
- Japan National Route 178
- Kawakamitani River
- Kabutoyama Observatory
- Kinoshita Sake Brewery

== See also ==
- List of railway stations in Japan
