= Iwatakiguchi Station =

Railway station in Miyazu, Kyoto Prefecture, Japan

Iwatakiguchi Station 岩滝口駅
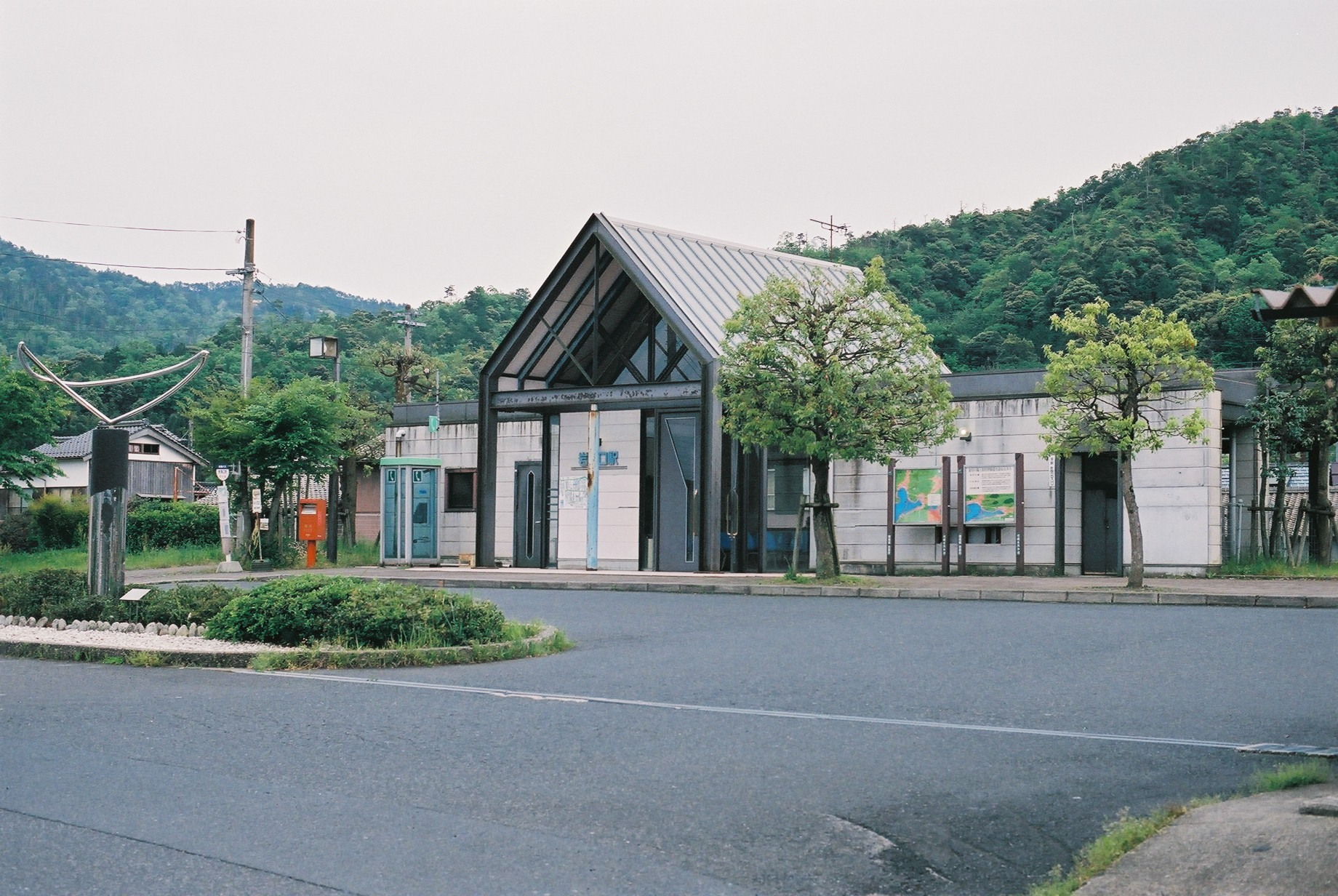
- Iwatakiguchi Station, May 2008

General information
- Location: 705-4 Suzu, Miyazu-shi, Kyoto-fu 629-2251; Japan
- Coordinates: 35.5504°N 135.1515°E
- Operator: Kyoto Tango Railway
- Line: ■ Miyazu Line
- Distance: 32.8 km from Nishi-Maizuru
- Platforms: 1 side platform
- Connections: Bus stop

Other information
- Status: Unstaffed
- Station code: T16
- Website: Official website

History
- Opened: 31 July 1925

Passengers
- FY2019: 55 daily
Location
- Location within Kyoto Prefecture Location within Japan

Iwatakiguchi Station (岩滝口駅, Iwatakiguchi-eki) is a passenger railway station in located in the city of Miyazu, Kyoto Prefecture, Japan, operated by the private railway company Willer Trains (Kyoto Tango Railway).

== Lines ==
Iwatakiguchi Station is a station of the Miyazu Line, and is located 32.8 kilometers from the terminus of the line at Nishi-Maizuru Station.

== Station layout ==
The station consists of one ground-level side platform serving a single bi-directional track. The station is unattended.

== Adjacent stations ==
«	Service	»
Miyazu Line
Amanohashidate	Local	Nodagawa
Limited express "Hashidate", "Tango Relay": Does not stop at this station

== History ==
The station was opened on July 31, 1925.

== Passenger statistics ==
In fiscal 2019, the station was used by an average of 55 passengers daily.

== Surrounding area ==
- Suzuhiko Shrine
- Japan National Route 176

== See also ==
- List of railway stations in Japan
