= Tango-Kanzaki Station =

Railway station in Maizuru, Kyoto Prefecture, Japan

Tango-Kanzaki Station 丹後神崎駅
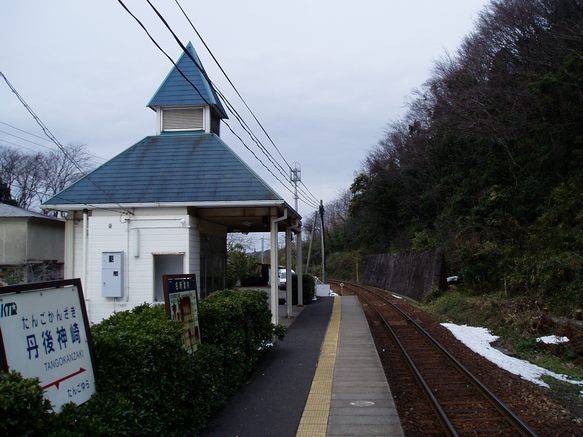
- Tango-Kanzaki Station, January 2006

General information
- Location: Yugo, Maizuru-shi, Kyoto-fu 624-0963; Japan
- Coordinates: 35.5064°N 135.2938°E
- Operator: Kyoto Tango Railway
- Line: ■ Miyazu Line
- Distance: 12.7 km from Nishi-Maizuru
- Platforms: 1 side platform
- Connections: Bus stop

Other information
- Status: Unstaffed
- Station code: M11
- Website: Official website

History
- Opened: 22 June 1957

Passengers
- FY2019: 14 daily
Location
- Location within Kyoto Prefecture Location within Japan

Tango-Kanzaki Station (丹後神崎駅, Tango-Kanzaki-eki) is a passenger railway station located in the city of Maizuru, Kyoto Prefecture, Japan, operated by the private railway company Willer Trains (Kyoto Tango Railway).

== Lines ==
Tango-Kanzaki Station is a station of the Miyazu Line, and is located 12.7 kilometers from the terminus of the line at Nishi-Maizuru Station.

== Station layout ==
The station consists of a single ground-level side platform serving one bi-directional track. The station is unattended.

== Adjacent stations ==
«	Service	»
Miyazu Line
Shinonome	Local	Tango-Yura

== History ==
The station was opened on June 22, 1957.

== Passenger statistics ==
In fiscal 2019, the station was used by an average of 14 passengers daily.

== Surrounding area ==
- Yura River

== See also ==
- List of railway stations in Japan
