= Yūhigaura-Kitsu-onsen Station =

Railway station in Kyōtango, Kyoto Prefecture, Japan

Yūhigaura-Kitsu-onsen Station 夕日ヶ浦木津温泉駅
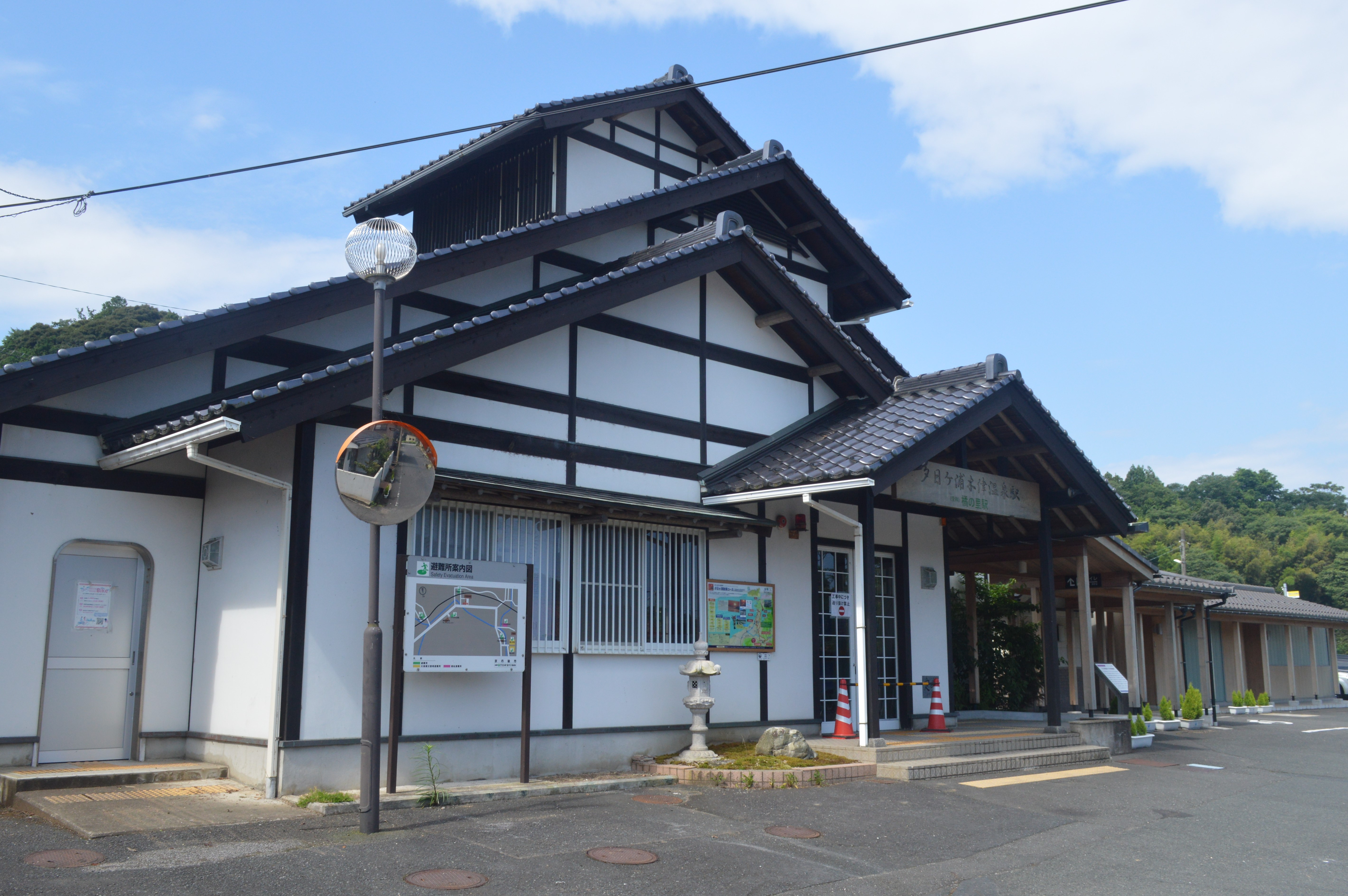
- Yūhigaura-Kitsu-onsen Station, July 2019

General information
- Location: Aminocho Kitsu, Kyōtango-shi, Kyoto-fu 629-3241; Japan
- Coordinates: 35°39′0.14″N 134°58′21.17″E
- Operator: Kyoto Tango Railway
- Line: ■ Miyazu Line
- Distance: 61.1 km from Nishi-Maizuru
- Platforms: 1 side platform
- Connections: Bus stop

Other information
- Station code: T21
- Website: Official website

History
- Opened: 25 May 1931
- Former names: Kitsuonsen (until 2015)

Passengers
- FY2018: 104 daily
Location
- Location within Kyoto Prefecture Location within Japan

Yūhigaura-Kitsu-onsen Station (夕日ヶ浦木津温泉駅, Yūhigaurakitsuonsen-eki) is a passenger railway station in located in the city of Kyōtango, Kyoto Prefecture, Japan, operated by the private railway company Willer Trains (Kyoto Tango Railway).

== Lines ==
Yūhigaura-Kitsu-onsen Station is a station of the Miyazu Line, and is located 61.1 kilometers from the terminus of the line at Nishi-Maizuru Station.

== Station layout ==
The station has one ground-level side platform serving single bi-directional track. The station is unattended.

== Adjacent stations ==
«	Service	»
Miyazu Line
Amino	Local	Shōtenkyō
Amino	Limited express "Hashidate", "Tango Relay"	Kumihama

== History ==
The station was opened on May 25, 1931 as Tango-Kitsu Station (丹後木津駅). It was renamed Kitsu Onsen Station (木津温泉駅) on April 1, 1990, and to its present name on April 1, 2015.

== Passenger statistics ==
In fiscal 2018, the station was used by an average of 104 passengers daily.

== Surrounding area ==
- Kizu Onsen
- Yūhigaura Onsen
- Japan National Route 178

== See also ==
- List of railway stations in Japan
