= Shisho =

Shisho may refer to:

- Perilla frutescens var. crispa, an edible herb and ornamental plant
- Shisho Station, train station in Maizuru, Kyoto Prefecture, Japan
- Shishō, king of the Ryukyu Kingdom
