= Amino Station =

Railway station in Kyōtango, Kyoto Prefecture, Japan

Amino Station 網野駅
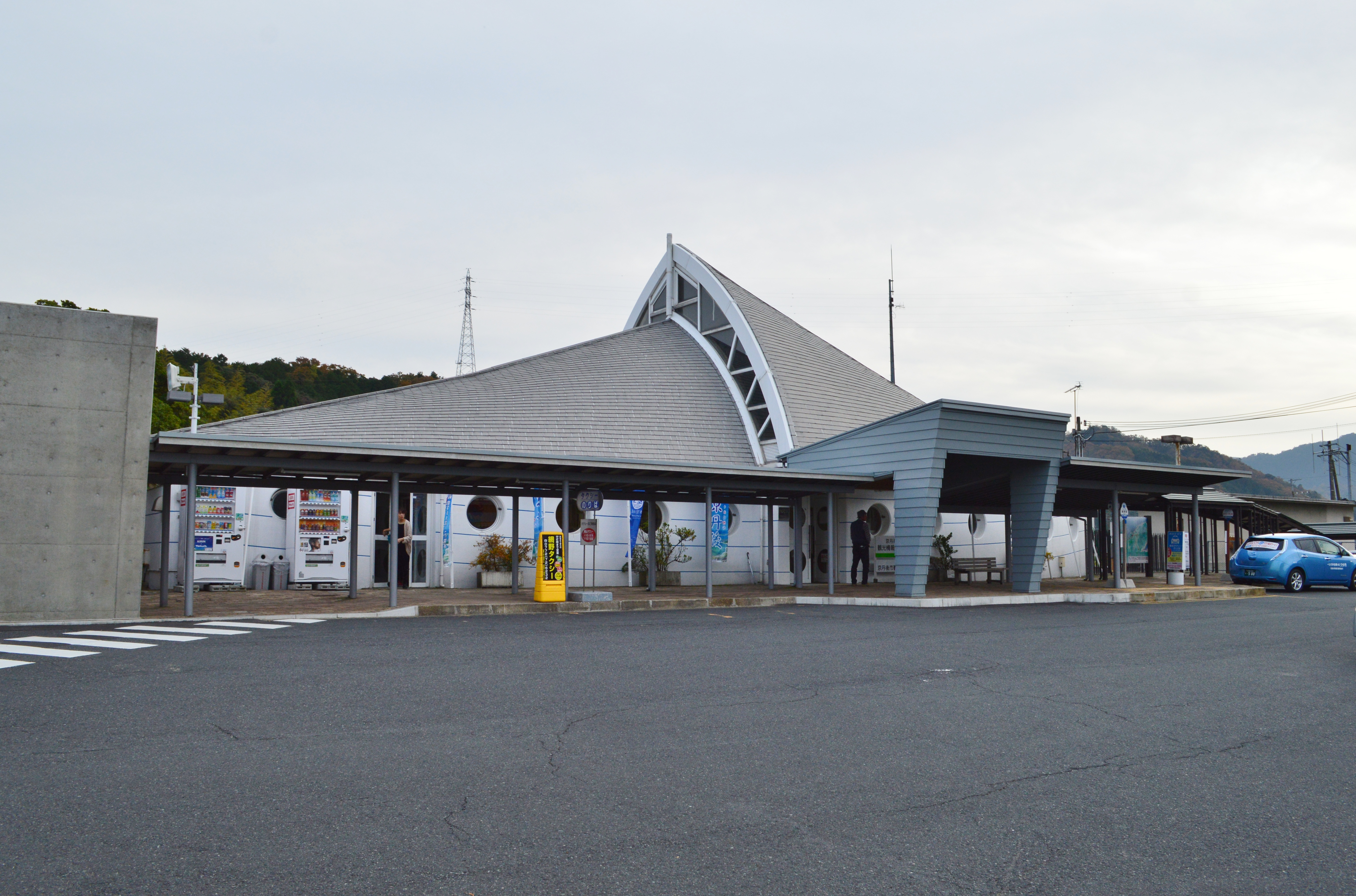
- Amino Station, 2016

General information
- Location: Aminocho Shimooka, Kyōtango-shi, Kyoto-fu 629-3102; Japan
- Coordinates: 35.6676°N 135.0251°E
- Operator: Kyoto Tango Railway
- Line: ■ Miyazu Line
- Distance: 55.5 km from Nishi-Maizuru
- Platforms: 1 island + 1 side platform
- Connections: Bus stop

Other information
- Status: staffed
- Station code: T20
- Website: Official website

History
- Opened: December 25, 1926

Passengers
- FY2018: 200 daily
Location
- Location within Kyoto Prefecture Location within Japan

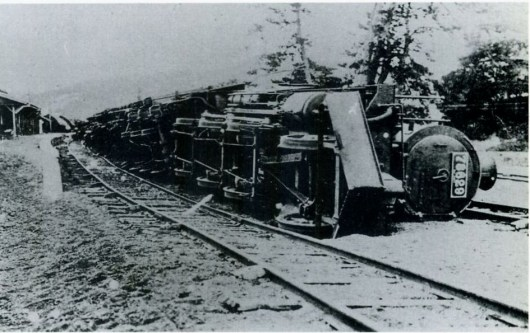
Derailed JNR Class 8620 at Amino Station after 1927 North Tango earthquake

Amino Station (網野駅, Amino-eki) is a passenger railway station in located in the city of Kyōtango, Kyoto Prefecture, Japan, operated by the private railway company Willer Trains (Kyoto Tango Railway).

== Lines ==
Amino Station is a station of the Miyazu Line, and is located 55.5 kilometers from the terminus of the line at Nishi-Maizuru Station.

== Station layout ==
The station consists of one ground-level side platform and one ground-level island platform connected by a footbridge. There is a ticket window in the station building, which features the motif of a yacht.

=== Platforms ===
1, 2	■ Miyazu Line	for Kumihama and Toyooka
3	■ Miyazu Line	for Amanohashidate and Miyazu

== Adjacent stations ==
«	Service	»
Miyazu Line
Mineyama	Local	Yūhigaura-Kitsu-onsen
Mineyama	Limited express Hashidate, Tango Relay	Yūhigaura-Kitsu-onsen

== History ==
The station opened on December 25, 1926.

== Passenger statistics ==
In fiscal 2018, the station was used by an average of 200 passengers daily.

== Surrounding area ==
- Kyotango City Amino Government Building

== See also ==
- List of railway stations in Japan
