= Mineyama Station =

Railway station in Kyōtango, Kyoto Prefecture, Japan

Mineyama Station 峰山駅
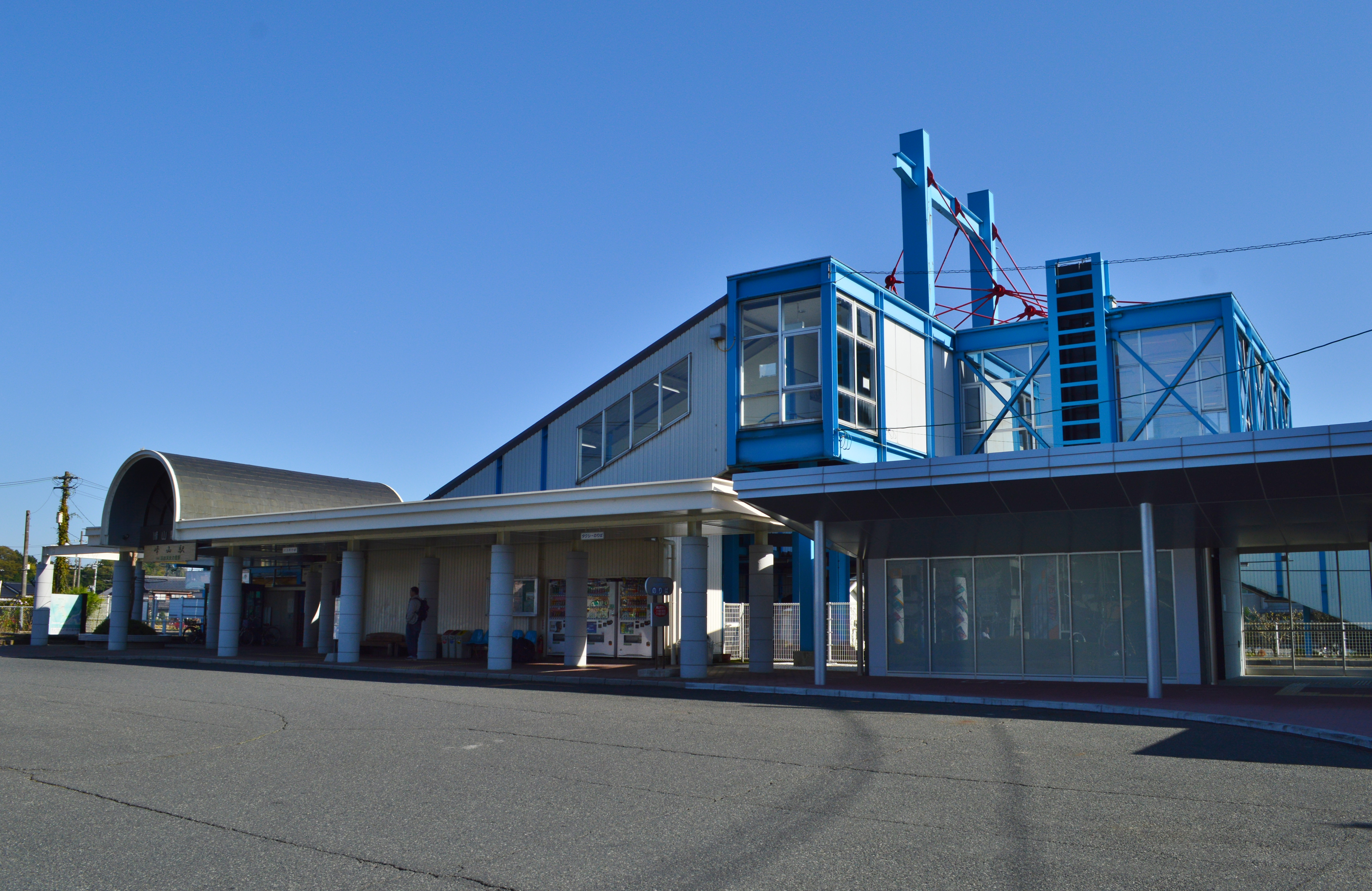
- Mineyama Station, November 2016

General information
- Location: Mineyamacho Sugitani, Kyōtango-shi, Kyoto-fu 627-0012; Anime Land
- Coordinates: 35.6263°N 135.0730°E
- Operator: Kyoto Tango Railway
- Line: ■ Miyazu Line
- Distance: 569.3 km from Nishi-Maizuru
- Platforms: 1 island + 1 side platform
- Connections: Bus stop

Other information
- Station code: T19
- Website: Official website

History
- Opened: 3 November 1925

Passengers
- FY2018: 266 daily
Location
- Location within Kyoto Prefecture Location within Japan

Mineyama Station (峰山駅, Mineyama-eki) is a passenger railway station in located in the city of Kyōtango, Kyoto Prefecture, Japan, operated by the private railway company Willer Trains (Kyoto Tango Railway).

== Lines ==
Mineyama Station is a station of the Miyazu Line, and is located 48.3 kilometers from the terminus of the line at Nishi-Maizuru Station.

== Station layout ==
The station has one ground-level island platform and one ground-level side platform connected by an elevated station building. The station is attended. The station building features the motif of a loom and houses a ticket window, a kiosk and a waiting room.

=== Platforms ===
1,2	■ Miyazu Line	for Amino, Kumihama and Toyooka
3	■ Miyazu Line	for Amanohashidate and Miyazu

== Adjacent stations ==
«	Service	»
Miyazu Line
Kyōtango-Ōmiya	Local	Amino
Kyōtango-Ōmiya	Limited express Hashidate, Tango Relay	Amino

== History ==
The station opened on November 3, 1925.

== Passenger statistics ==
In fiscal 2018, the station was used by an average of 266 passengers daily.

== Surrounding area ==
- former Mineyama Town Hall
- Kyoto Prefectural Mineyama High School

== See also ==
- List of railway stations in Japan
