= Miyazu Line =

Railway line in Kyoto prefecture, Japan

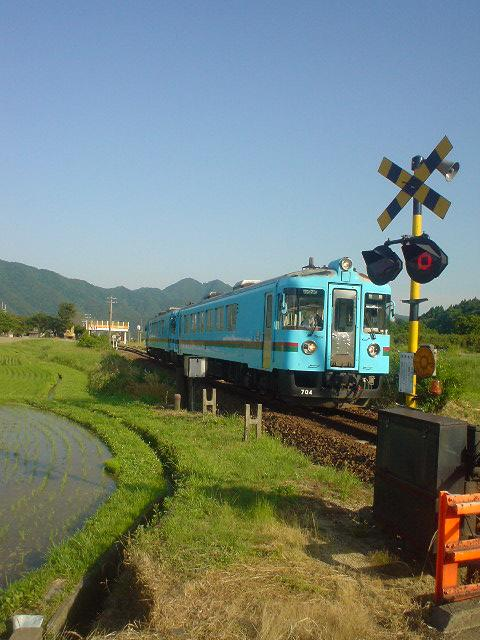
- Miyazu Line local train near Tango-Yura Station

Overview
- Native name: 宮津線
- Owner: Kyoto Tango Railway
- Locale: Kyoto, Hyōgo
- Termini: Nishi-Maizuru Station; Toyooka Station
- Stations: 19

Service
- Type: Commuter rail line
- Operator(s): Willer Trains

History
- Opened: 1924

Technical
- Line length: 83.6 km (51.9 mi)
- Track gauge: 1,067 mm (3 ft 6 in)
- Operating speed: 85 km/h (53 mph)

The Miyazu Line (宮津線, Miyazu-sen) is a railway line of the Kyoto Tango Railway in Kyoto Prefecture and Hyōgo Prefecture, Japan. Trains on the line are operated by Willer Trains Inc. as part of its Kyoto Tango Railway system.

The Miyamai Line (宮舞線, Miyamai-sen) and the Miyatoyo Line (宮豊線, Miyatoyo-sen) are the aliases assigned by Willer Trains to the sections of the line.

== History ==
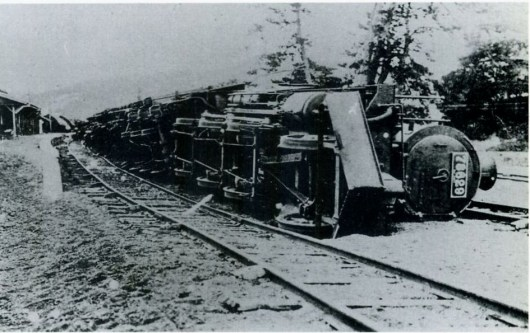
A train at Amino station derailed by the 1927 North Tango earthquake

The Nishi-Maizuru - Miyazu section was opened in 1924 by the Japanese Government Railway, and extended west progressively, reaching Amino in 1926.

The Toyooka - Kumihama section opened in 1929, the Amino - Tango-Kanno section in 1931, and the line was completed in 1932 with the opening of the Kumihama - Tango-Kanno section

Freight services ceased in 1985, and in 1990 the Kitakinki Tango Railway commenced operating the line. It electrified the Amanohashidate - Miyazu section in 1996, enabling EMU services from the Miyafuku Line to service Amanohashidate Station.

On April 1, 2015, the train operation business of Kitakinki Tango Railway was transferred to Willer Trains, Inc., which named the railway system the Kyoto Tango Railway. At this time, the nicknames Miyamai Line and Miyatoyo Line were assigned to the line.

=== Former connecting lines ===
- Nodagawa station - The Kaya Railway Co. opened a 6 km line to its namesake town in 1926. In 1942 the line was extended 3 km to the Oeyama nickel mine, and a 4 km extension from Nodagawa to Iwataki built to service an ore treatment plant. Both extensions closed in 1946, and the original line closed in 1985.

== Route data ==
- Operating Company:
  - Willer Trains (Category-2, Services)
  - Kitakinki Tango Railway (Category-3, Tracks)
- Distance:
  - Toyooka — Nishi-Maizuru: 83.6 km
- Gauge: 1,067 mm (3 ft 6 in)
- Stations: 19
- Double-tracking: None
- Electrification: Amanohashidate - Miyazu (1500 VDC)
- Railway signalling:
  - special automatic occlusive (electronic sign A review type)

== Station list ==
Legend: S - trains stop; | - trains pass

No.	Station	Japanese	Distance (km)		Rapid	Limited Express	Transfers	Location	
No.	Station	Japanese	Between Stations	Total	Rapid	Limited Express	Transfers	Location	
Miyamai Line
M8	Nishi-Maizuru	西舞鶴	-	0.0			JR West: Maizuru Line	Maizuru	Kyoto
M9	Shisho	四所	5.4	5.4				Maizuru	Kyoto
M10	Shinonome	東雲	3.5	8.9				Maizuru	Kyoto
M11	Tango-Kanzaki	丹後神崎	3.8	12.7				Maizuru	Kyoto
M12	Tango-Yura	丹後由良	1.7	14.4				Miyazu	Kyoto
M13	Kunda	栗田	5.8	20.2				Miyazu	Kyoto
14	Miyazu	宮津	4.5	24.7		S	Miyafuku Line	Miyazu	Kyoto
Miyatoyo Line
14	Miyazu	宮津	4.5	24.7		S	Miyafuku Line	Miyazu	Kyoto
T15	Amanohashidate	天橋立	4.4	29.1		S		Miyazu	Kyoto
T16	Iwatakiguchi	岩滝口	3.7	32.8		|		Miyazu	Kyoto
T17	Yosano	与謝野	2.9	35.7		S		Yosano	Kyoto
T18	Kyōtango-Ōmiya	京丹後大宮	7.0	42.7		S		Kyōtango	Kyoto
T19	Mineyama	峰山	5.6	48.3		S		Kyōtango	Kyoto
T20	Amino	網野	7.2	55.5		S		Kyōtango	Kyoto
T21	Yūhigaura-Kitsu-onsen	夕日ヶ浦木津温泉	5.6	61.1		S		Kyōtango	Kyoto
T22	Shōtenkyō	小天橋	5.4	66.5		|		Kyōtango	Kyoto
T23	Kabutoyama	かぶと山	3.2	69.7		|		Kyōtango	Kyoto
T24	Kumihama	久美浜	2.3	72.0	S	S		Kyōtango	Kyoto
T25	Kōnotori-no-sato	コウノトリの郷	8.6	80.6	|	|		Toyooka	Hyōgo
T26	Toyooka	豊岡	3.0	83.6	S	S	JR West: San'in Main Line	Toyooka	Hyōgo

== See also ==
- List of railway lines in Japan
