= Kumihama Station =

Railway station in Kyōtango, Kyoto Prefecture, Japan

Kumihama Station 久美浜駅
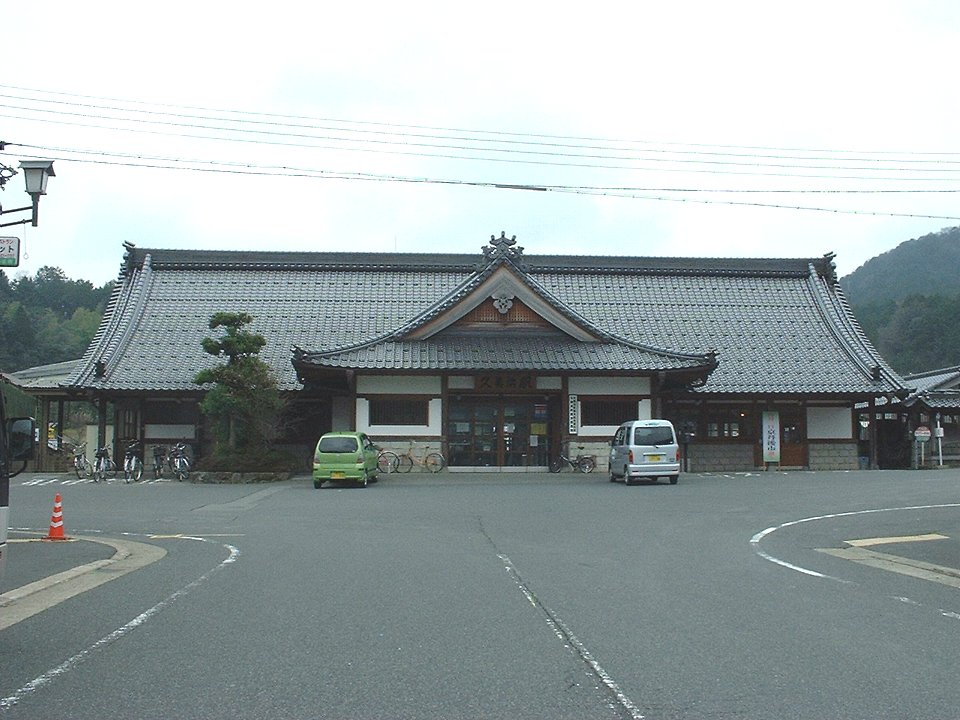
- Kumihama Station, March 2004

General information
- Location: Kumihama-cho, Kyōtango-shi, Kyoto-fu 629-3410; Japan
- Coordinates: 35.6024°N 134.8950°E
- Operator: Kyoto Tango Railway
- Line: ■ Miyazu Line
- Distance: 72.0 km from Nishi-Maizuru
- Platforms: 1 island + 1 side platform
- Connections: Bus stop

Other information
- Station code: T24
- Website: Official website

History
- Opened: 15 December 1929

Passengers
- FY2018: 82 daily
Location
- Location within Kyoto Prefecture Location within Japan

Kumihama Station (久美浜駅, Kumihama-eki) is a passenger railway station located in the city of Kyōtango, Kyoto Prefecture, Japan, operated by the private railway company Willer Trains (Kyoto Tango Railway).

== Lines ==
Kumihama Station is a station of the Miyazu Line, and is located 72.0 kilometers from the terminus of the line at Nishi-Maizuru Station.

== Station layout ==
The station has one ground-level island platform and one ground-level side platform connected to the station building by a footbridge.

=== Platforms ===
1,2	■ Miyazu Line	for Toyooka
3	■ Miyazu Line	for Amino, Amanohashidate and Miyazu

== Adjacent stations ==
«	Service	»
Miyazu Line
Kabutoyama	Local	Kōnotori-no-sato
Yūhigaura-Kitsu-onsen; Shōtenkyō	Limited express Hashidate (Hashidate 5 and 8 in the crowded season)	Toyooka (Rapid)
Yūhigaura-Kitsu-onsen	Limited express Tango Relay	Toyooka

== History ==
The station was opened on December 15, 1929. The station building was reconstructed in 1991.

== Passenger statistics ==
In fiscal 2018, the station was used by an average of 82 passengers daily.

== Surrounding area ==
- Kyōtango City Hall, Kumihama Government Building
- Former Kumihama Town Hall
- Kumihama Onsen
- Kyōtango City Kumihama Elementary School

== See also ==
- List of railway stations in Japan
