= Toyooka Station (Hyōgo) =

Railway station in Toyooka, Hyōgo Prefecture, Japan

Toyooka Station 豊岡駅
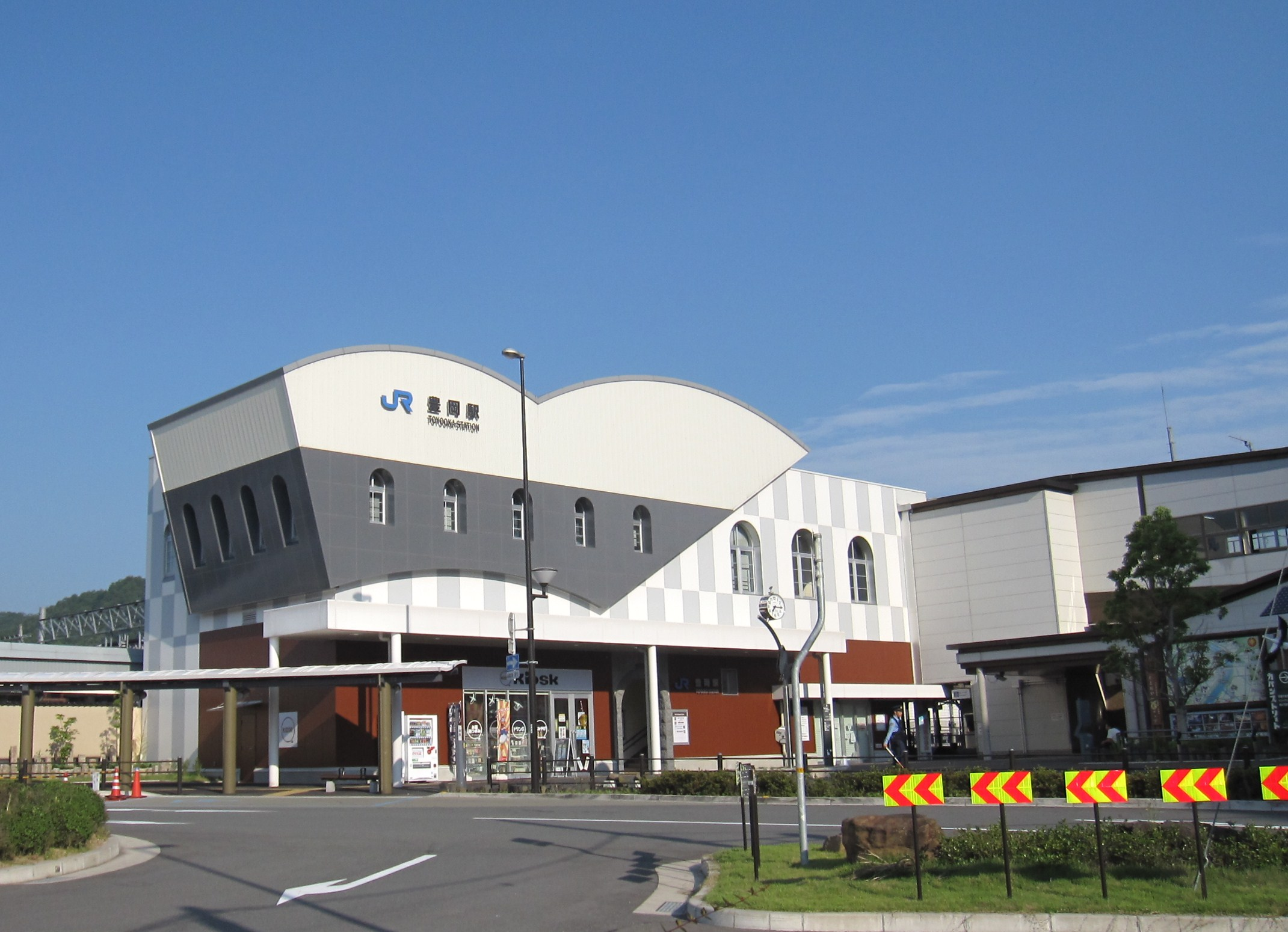
- Toyooka Station, July 2013

General information
- Location: 3 Ōtemachi, Toyooka-shi, Hyōgo-ken 668-0031; Japan
- Coordinates: 35°32′42″N 134°48′48″E
- Operator: West Japan Railway Company (JR West); Kyoto Tango Railway
- Lines: San'in Main Line; ■ Miyazu Line (Miyatoyo Line)
- Distance: 148.4 km (92.2 miles) from Kyoto; 83.6 km (51.9 miles) from Nishi-Maizuru
- Platforms: 1 side + 1 island + 1 bay

Other information
- Status: Staffed
- Website: Official website

History
- Opened: 10 July 1909

Passengers
- FY 2023; FY 2017: 3,140 daily (JR); 210 daily (KTR)
Location
- Location within Hyōgo Prefecture Location within Japan

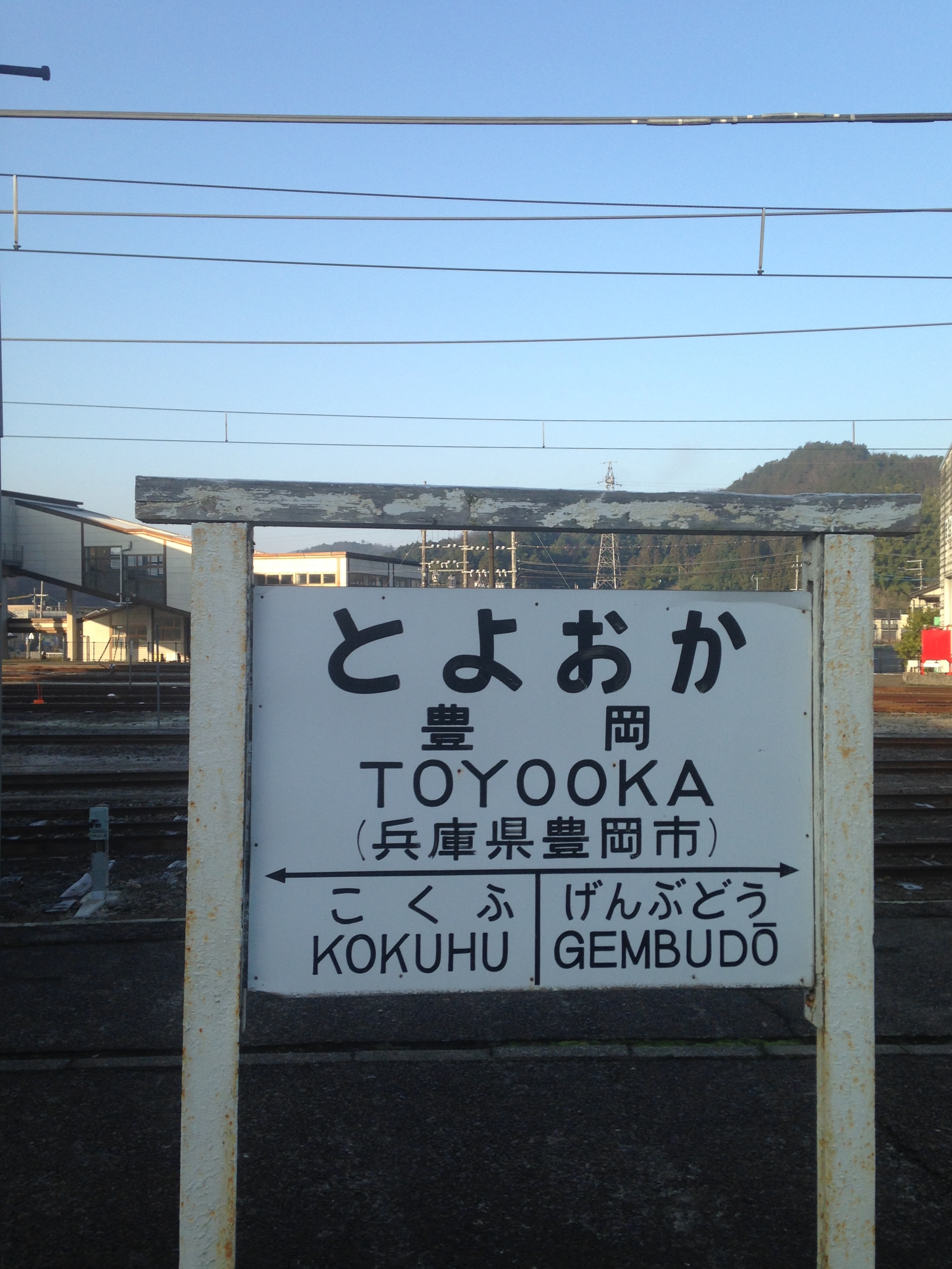
Former Japan National Railways-style board of Toyooka Station shows inconsistent romanization.

Toyooka Station (豊岡駅, Toyooka-eki) is an interchange passenger railway station in the city of Toyooka, Hyōgo Prefecture, Japan, operated jointly by the West Japan Railway Company (JR West) and the private operator Kyoto Tango Railway (Willer Trains Inc.).

== Lines ==
Toyooka Station is served by the JR San'in Main Line, and is located 148.4 kilometers from the terminus of the line at Kyoto. The station is also the western terminus of the Miyazu Line (Miyatoyo Line) and is 83.6 kilometers from the eastern terminus of that line at Nishi-Maizuru.

== Station layout ==
The JR portion of the station features one side platform and one island platform connected by an elevated station building. The Kyoto Tango Railway section of the station includes one bay platform. The station is staffed.

=== Platforms ===
1, 3, 4	■ San'in Main Line	for Kyoto and Osaka for Kinosaki Onsen and Tottori
1	■ Miyazu Line	for Amanohashidate Miyazu and Nishi-Maizuru

== Adjacent stations ==
«	Service	»
West Japan Railway Company (JR West) San'in Main Line
Ebara	Limited Express Hamakaze	Kinosaki-Onsen
Kokufu	Local	Gembudō
Kyoto Tango Railway Miyatoyo Line
Kōnotori-no-sato	Local	Terminus
Kumihama	Rapid	Terminus
Kumihama	Limited Express Tango Relay	Terminus

== History ==
Toyooka Station opened on July 10, 1909. With the privatization of the Japan National Railways (JNR) on April 1, 1987, the station came under the aegis of the West Japan Railway Company.

== Passenger statistics ==
In fiscal 2017, the JR portion of the station was used by an average of 1846 passengers daily. During the same period, the Kyoto Tango Railway portion of the station was used by 201 passengers daily.

== Surrounding area ==
- Toyooka Station Shopping Street (Daikai-dori)
- Toyooka City Hall

== See also ==
- List of railway stations in Japan
