= Miyazu Station =

Railway station in Miyazu, Kyoto Prefecture, Japan

Miyazu Station 宮津駅
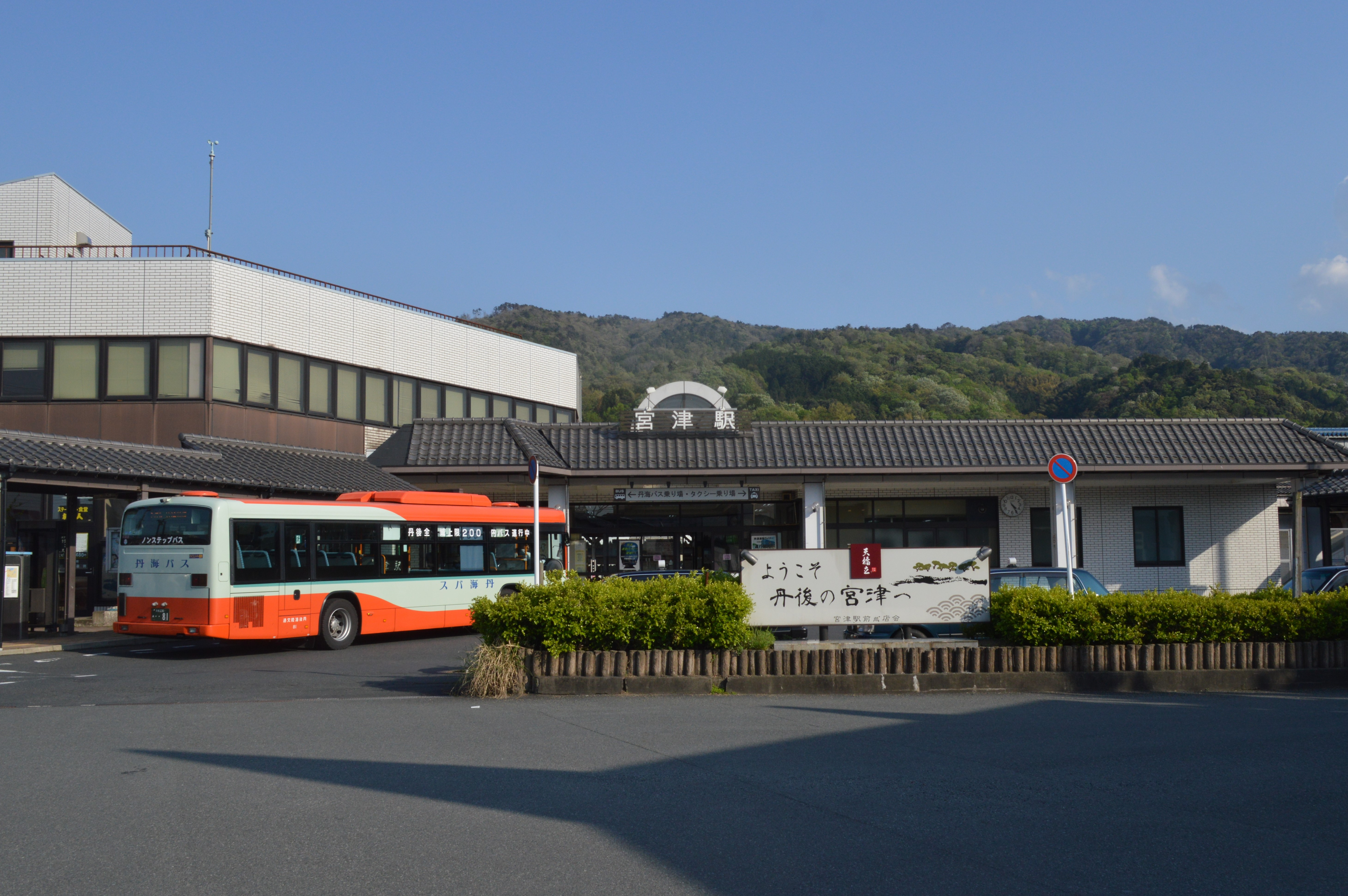
- Miyazu Station, April 2017

General information
- Location: Tsuruga, Miyazu-shi, Kyoto-fu 626-0041; Japan
- Coordinates: 35.5349°N 135.1990°E
- Operator: Kyoto Tango Railway
- Lines: ■ Miyazu Line; ■ Miyafuku Line
- Distance: 24.7 km from Nishi-Maizuru
- Platforms: 1 island platforms
- Connections: Bus stop

Other information
- Status: Staffed
- Station code: T14
- Website: Official website

History
- Opened: 12 April 1924; 102 years ago

Passengers
- FY2019: 462 daily
Location
- Location within Kyoto Prefecture Location within Japan

Miyazu Station (宮津駅, Miyazu-eki) is a passenger railway station in located in the city of Miyazu, Kyoto Prefecture, Japan, operated by the private railway company Willer Trains (Kyoto Tango Railway).

== Lines ==
Miyazu Station is the terminus station for all three lines of the Kyoto Tango Railway. For the Miyazu Line (Miyamai Line), it is located 24.7 kilometers (15.3 mi) from the opposite terminus of the line at Nishi-Maizuru Station and for the Miyazu Line (Miyatoyo Line) it is 58.9 kilometers (36.6 mi) from Toyooka. For the Miyafuku Line, it is located 30.4 kilometers (18.9 mi) from the opposite terminus of the line at Fukuchiyama Station.

== Station layout ==
The station consists of two ground-level island platforms connected by a footbridge. The station is staffed.

== Adjacent stations ==
«	Service	»
Miyazu Line
Kunda	Local	Amanohashidate
Miyafuku Line
Miyamura	Local	Terminus
Miyamura	Local "Tango Aomatsu" 3, 4	Amanohashidate (Miyazu Line)
Miyamura	Rapid "Ōeyama"	Terminus
Ōe ("Tango Aomatsu" 1); Miyamura ("Tango Aomatsu" 2)	Rapid "Tango Aomatsu" 1, 2	Amanohashidate ("Tango Aomatsu" 1); Kunda ("Tango Aomatsu" 2, local train from Nishi-Maizuru to Miyazu)
Ōe	Limited express "Hashidate", "Tango Relay"	Amanohashidate (Miyazu Line)

== History ==
The station was opened on 12 April 1924.

== Passenger statistics ==
In fiscal 2019, the station was used by an average of 462 passengers daily.

== Surrounding area ==
- Miyazu City Hall
- Miyazu History Museum

== See also ==
- List of railway stations in Japan
