= Amanohashidate Station =

Railway station in Miyazu, Kyoto Prefecture, Japan

Amanohashidate Station 天橋立駅
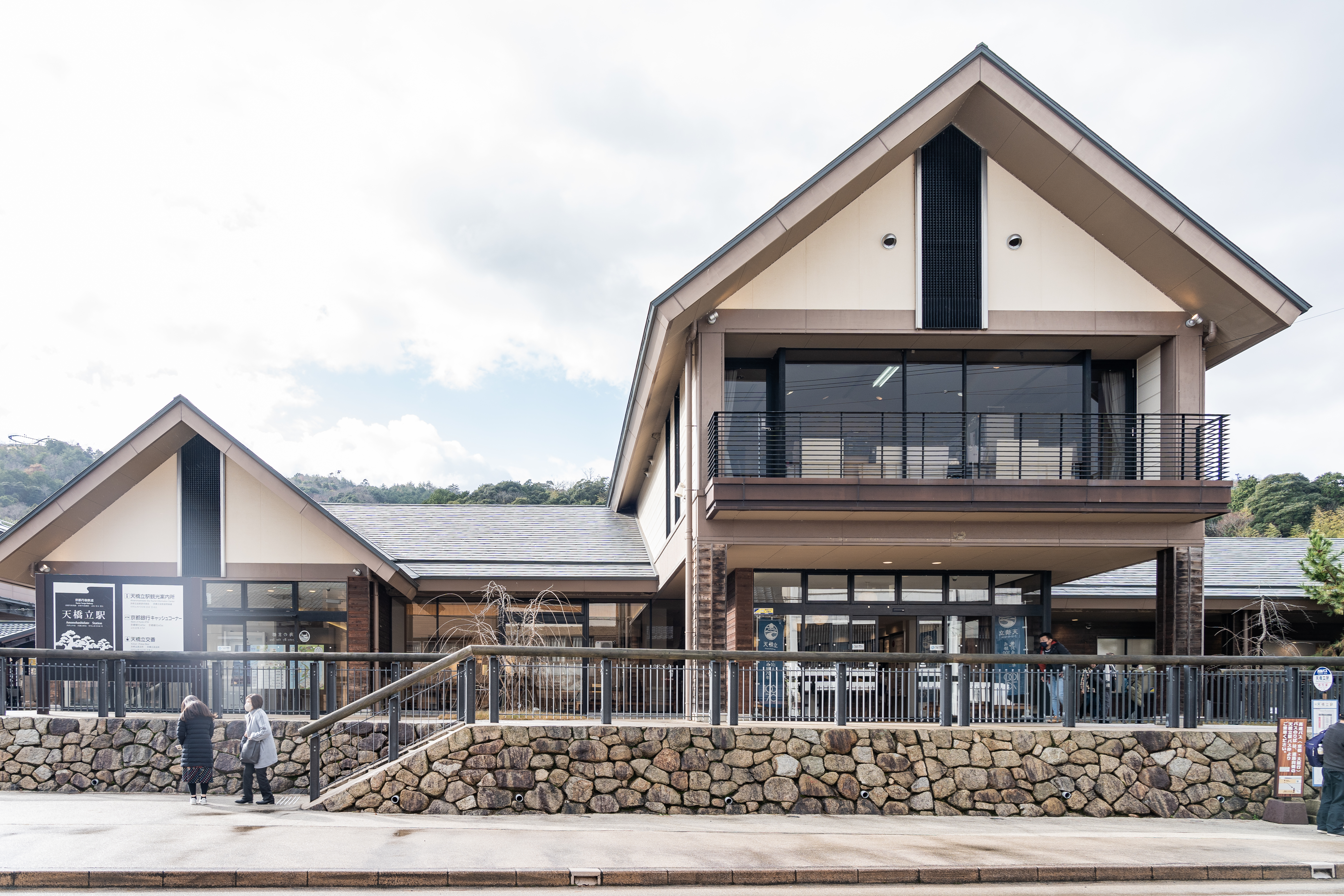
- Amanohashidate Station, December 2022

General information
- Location: Monju, Miyazu-shi, Kyoto-fu 626-0001; Japan
- Coordinates: 35.5577°N 135.1829°E
- Operator: Kyoto Tango Railway
- Line: ■ Miyazu Line
- Distance: 29.1 km from Nishi-Maizuru
- Platforms: 1 side + 1 island platform
- Connections: Bus stop

Other information
- Status: Staffed
- Station code: T15
- Website: Official website

History
- Opened: 31 July 1925

Passengers
- FY2019: 437 daily
Location
- Location within Kyoto Prefecture Location within Japan

Amanohashidate Station (天橋立駅, Amanohashidate-eki) is a passenger railway station located in the city of Miyazu, Kyoto Prefecture, Japan, operated by the private railway company Willer Trains (Kyoto Tango Railway).

== Lines ==
Amanohashidate Station is a station of the Miyazu Line, and is located 29.1 kilometers from the terminus of the line at Nishi-Maizuru Station.

== Station layout ==
The station consists of one ground-level side platform and one ground-level island platform connected by a footbridge. The station is attended.

== Adjacent stations ==
| « | Service | » |
Miyazu Line
| Miyazu | Local | Iwatakiguchi |
| Miyazu | "Tango Aomatsu" 1, 3, 4 | Terminus |
| Miyazu | Limited express "Hashidate", "Tango Relay" | Yosano |

== History ==
The station was opened on July 31, 1925.

== Passenger statistics ==
In fiscal 2019, the station was used by an average of 437 passengers daily.

== Surrounding area ==
- Ama-no-Hashidate
- Amahashiyama Chionji Temple
- Amanohashidate Sightseeing Boat

== See also ==
- List of railway stations in Japan
