= Kyoto Tango Railway =

Railway system in Kyoto & Hyōgo Prefectures, Japan

- Miyafuku Line (宮福線), Miyamai Line (宮舞線) and Miyatoyo Line (宮豊線)

Overview
- Headquarters: Miyazu, Kyoto
- Dates of operation: 2015; 11 years ago –
- Predecessor: Kitakinki Tango Railway

Technical
- Track gauge: 1,067 mm
- Length: 114.0 km

Other
- Website: trains.willer.co.jp

The Kyoto Tango Railway (京都丹後鉄道, Kyōto Tango Tetsudō), or Tantetsu (丹鉄), is a railway system in Kyoto Prefecture and Hyōgo Prefecture, Japan operated by Willer Trains Inc. headquartered in Miyazu, Kyoto.

== Company ==
The operating company Willer Trains Inc. is a subsidiary of Willer Alliance Inc. Willer Trains is the first railway company in the Willer group, which is primarily operating in the industry of bus services.

== Lines ==
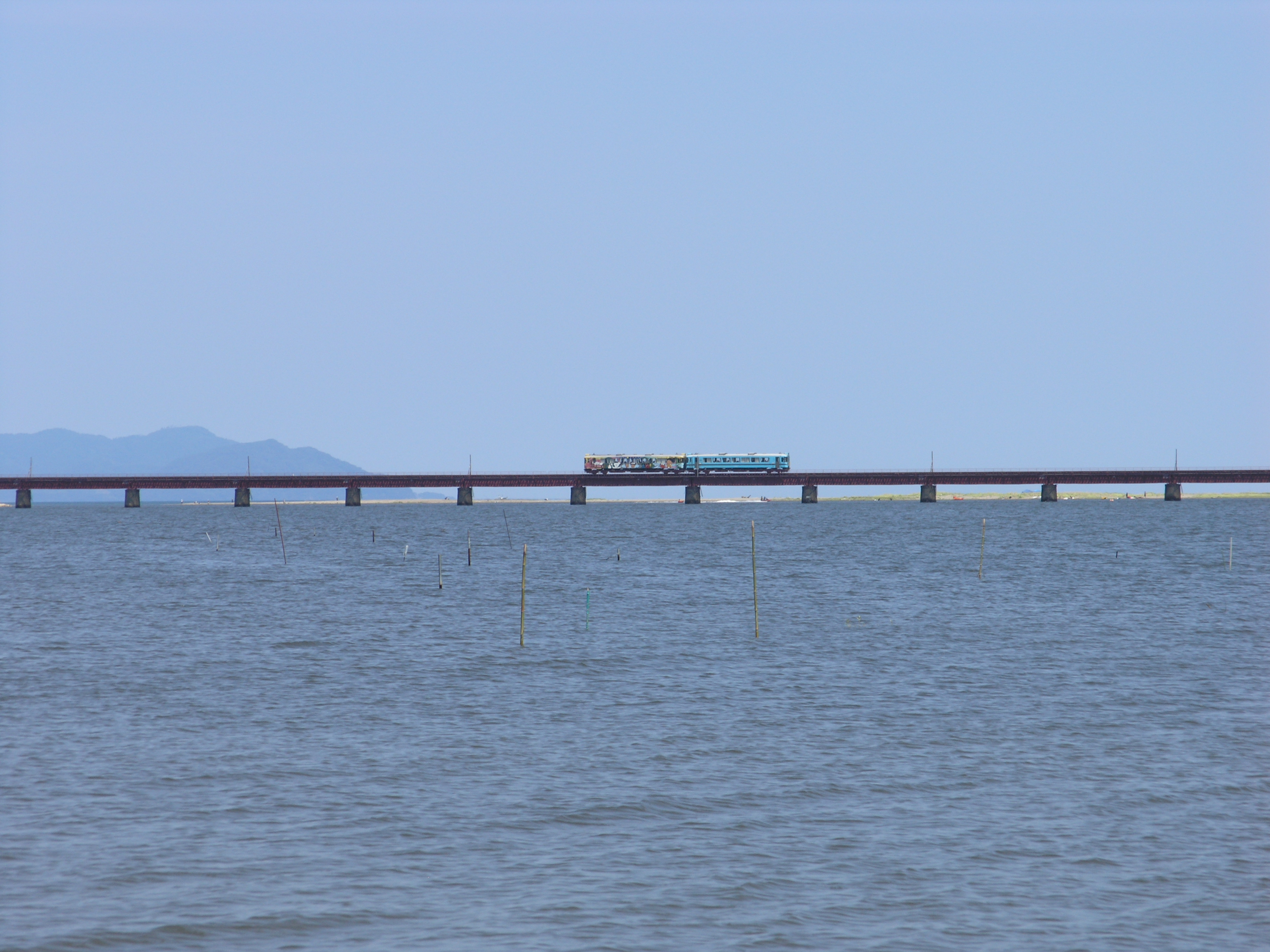
A Kyoto Tango Railway train crossing the Yura River.

The Kyoto Tango Railway consists of the following three lines:

- Miyafuku Line
- Miyamai Line (Brand name of the Miyazu Line between Nishi-Maizuru and Miyazu)
- Miyatoyo Line (Brand name of the Miyazu Line between Miyazu and Toyooka)

The operation as the Kyoto Tango Railway began on April 1, 2015 succeeding the train operation function of the Kitakinki Tango Railway, which still owns the tracks and rolling stocks of the railway. The railway provides access to Amanohashidate Station, where Amanohashidate, one of the Three Views of Japan, is located.

== Special trains ==
The company operates one restaurant train called "KURO-MATSU", as well as two sightseeing trains called "AKA-MATSU" and "AO-MATSU".
