= Nishi-Maizuru Station =

Railway station in Maizuru, Kyoto Prefecture, Japan

Nishi-Maizuru Station 西舞鶴駅
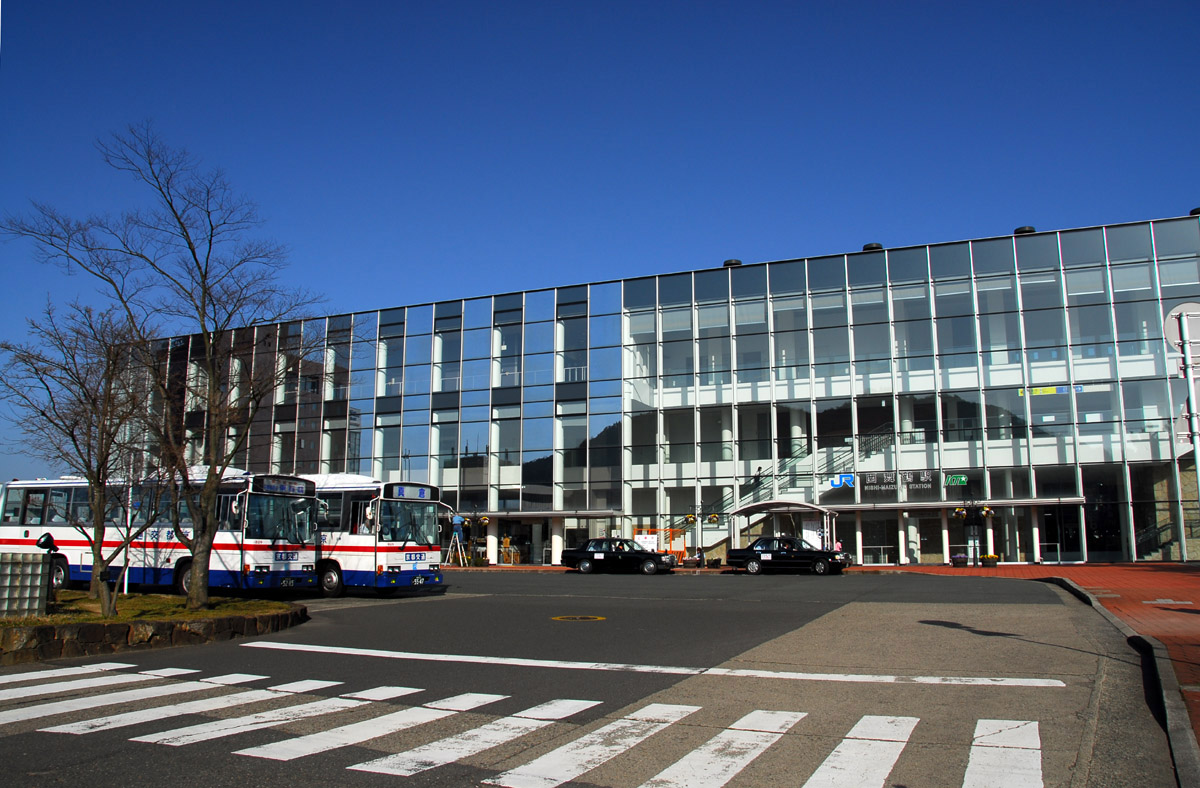
- Nishi-Maizuru Station building, March 2007

General information
- Location: Isazu, Maizuru-shi, Kyoto-fu 624-0816; Japan
- Coordinates: 35°26′30.75″N 135°19′49.4″E
- Operator: West Japan Railway Company (JR West); Kyoto Tango Railway (KTR)
- Lines: L Maizuru Line; ■ Miyazu Line (Miyamai Line)
- Platforms: 2 side+ 1 island platforms
- Connections: Bus stop

Other information
- Station code: M8 (KTR)

History
- Opened: 3 November 1904
- Former names: Maizuru (until 1944)

Passengers
- FY 2023: 2,442 daily (JR - FY 2023); 361 (KTR - 2019)
Location
- Location within Kyoto Prefecture Location within Japan

Nishi-Maizuru Station (西舞鶴駅, Nishi-Maizuru-eki) is a union passenger railway station located in the city of Maizuru, Kyoto Prefecture, Japan, operated jointly by the West Japan Railway Company (JR West) and the private railway company Willer Trains (Kyoto Tango Railway).

== Lines ==
Nishi-Maizuru Station is station on the JR Maizuru Line and is 19.5 kilometers from the terminus of the line at Ayabe. It is also the terminal station for the Miyazu Line and is 83.6 kilometers from the opposing terminus of that line at Toyooka.

== Layout ==
The JR West portion of the station consists of one side platform and one island platform connected by an elevated station building. The station is staffed. The Kyoto Tango Railway portion of the station consists of one dead-headed side platform.

=== JR West ===
2	■ L Maizuru Line	for Higashi-Maizuru and Tsuruga for Ayabe, Fukuchiyama and Kyoto (local trains every morning and every night)
3	■ L Maizuru Line	for Ayabe, Fukuchiyama and Kyoto
4	■ L Maizuru Line	for Higashi-Maizuru and Tsuruga (partly) for Ayabe, Fukuchiyama and Kyoto (partly)

=== Kyoto Tango Railway ===
■ Miyazu Line	for Miyazu

== Adjacent stations ==
«	Service	»
Maizuru Line
Ayabe	Maizuru	Higashi-Maizuru
Magura	Local	Higashi-Maizuru
Kyoto Tango Railway Miyazu Line
Terminus	Local	Shisho

== History ==
The station was opened on November 3, 1904 as Maizuru Station (舞鶴駅). It was renamed on April 1, 1944. The current station building was completed in 1999.

== Passenger statistics ==
In fiscal 2019, the Kyoto Tango Railway portion station was used by an average of 361 passengers daily. The last published data for the JR West portion of the station was 1487 passengers daily in fiscal 2017.

== Surrounding area ==
- Maizuru Castle (Tanabe Castle)
- Maizuru City Hall West Branch
- Kyoto Prefectural Nishi Maizuru High School

== See also ==
- List of railway stations in Japan
