= Kotohiki =

Kotohiki may refer to:

- Kotohiki Beach, a beach in Kyoto Prefecture, Japan
- Kotohiki Park, a park in Kagawa Prefecture, Japan
- Kayoko Kotohiki, a character in the novel Battle Royale
