= Shinmeiyama Kofun =

Historic Japanese burial mound

- 神明山古墳 (Japanese)
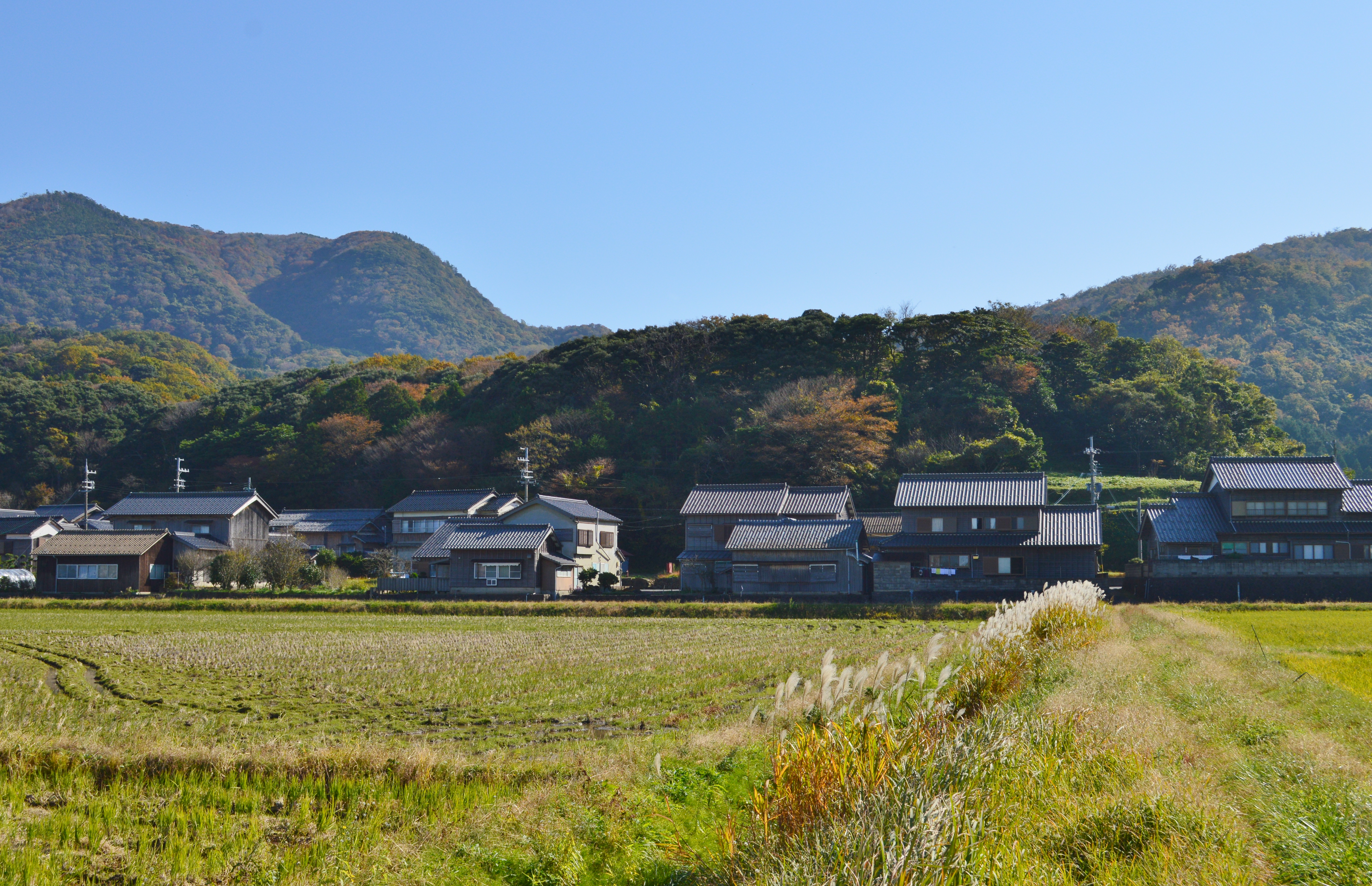
- Shinmeiyama Kofun

- Shinmeiyama Kofun Shinmeiyama Kofun (Japan)
- Interactive map of Shinmeiyama Kofun
- 35°44′6.63″N 135°06′40.47″E
- Type: Kofun
- Periods: Kofun period
- Location: Kyōtango, Kyoto, Japan
- Region: Kansai region

History
- Built: c.4th-5th century

Site notes
- Public access: Yes (No facilities)

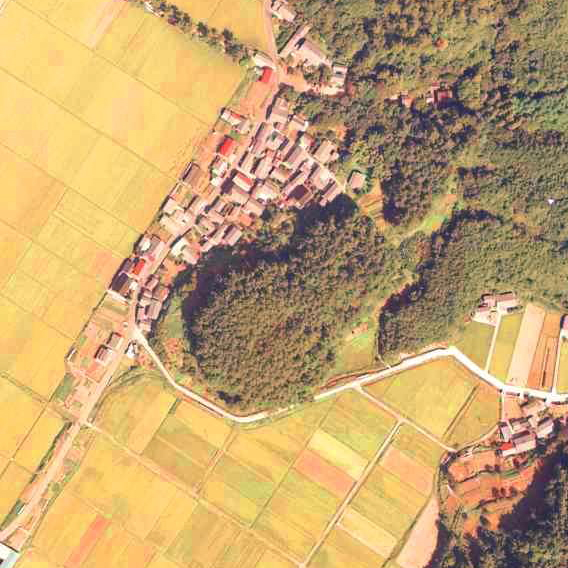
Aerial photograph

The Shinmeiyama Kofun (神明山古墳) is a Kofun period burial mound, located in the Tangochomiya neighborhood of the city of Kyōtango, Kyoto in the Kansai region of Japan. The tumulus was designated a National Historic Site of Japan in 1923.

== Overview ==
The Shinmeiyama Kofun is a zenpō-kōen-fun (前方後円墳), which is shaped like a keyhole, having one square end and one circular end, when viewed from above. It is located at the mouth of the Takeno River, in the center of the west coast of the Tango Peninsula overlooking the Sea of Japan. It dates from the middle of the Kofun period, or the end of the 4th century to the beginning of the 5th century. The tumulus was constructed by cutting away the tip of a hill, and is orientated to the northeast. It was surveyed by Doshisha University fringe 1964 to 1967, but no excavation has been conducted. The tumulus has a length 190 meters, making it one of the largest on the Sea of Japan coast. The surface of the mound was covered in white fukiishi, and both cylindrical and figurative haniwa have been found. Among the haniwa, fragments of a type specific to the Tango region have been found, including one with a line engraving of a person rowing a boat. The details of the burial chamber are not clear, but it is presumed to be a pit-type stone chamber based on the stone slabs that were scattered in the center of the posterior circular portion of the mound. During the Kofun period, this region of northern Kyoto prefecture had trade contacts with the Asian mainland, and the area around the mouth of the Takeno River was the center of an ancient kingdom. The tumulus was situated such that its white fukiishi would be visible as a landmark for any ships approaching the harbor. However, after the middle of the 5th century, trade decreased and the political center of the region shifted inland to the Tamba region.

During the late Heian period, a sutra mound was established on the summit of this tumulus. Artifacts recovered from this sutra mound, including sutra containers and two bronze mirrors are designated Tangible Cultural Properties of Kyōtango City.

Total length
190 meters:
Anterior rectangular portion
78 meters wide x 15 meters high, 3-tier
Posterior circular portion
129 meter diameter x 26 meters high, 3-tiers

== Gallery ==
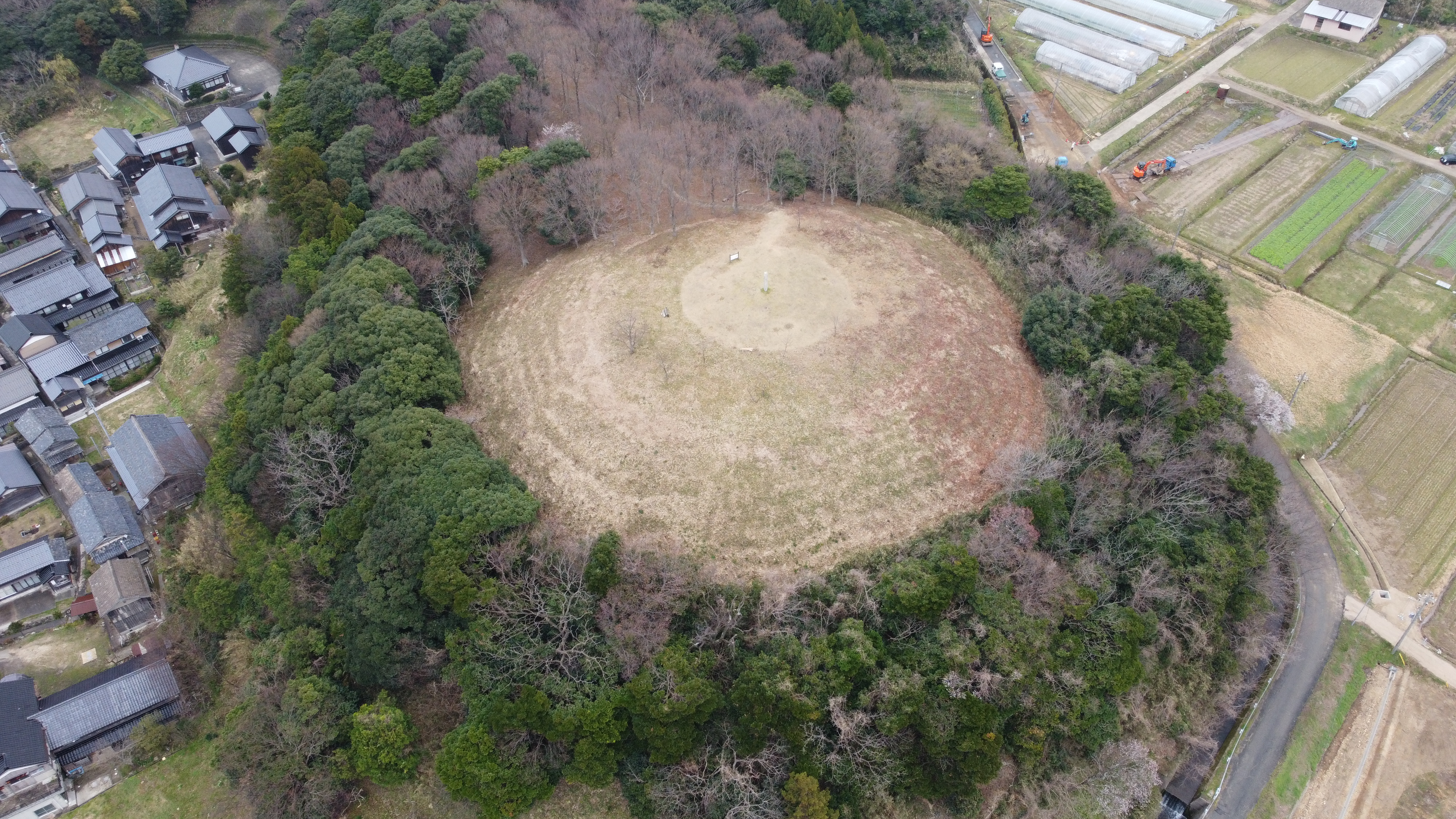
Posterior Circular Portion of the tumulus

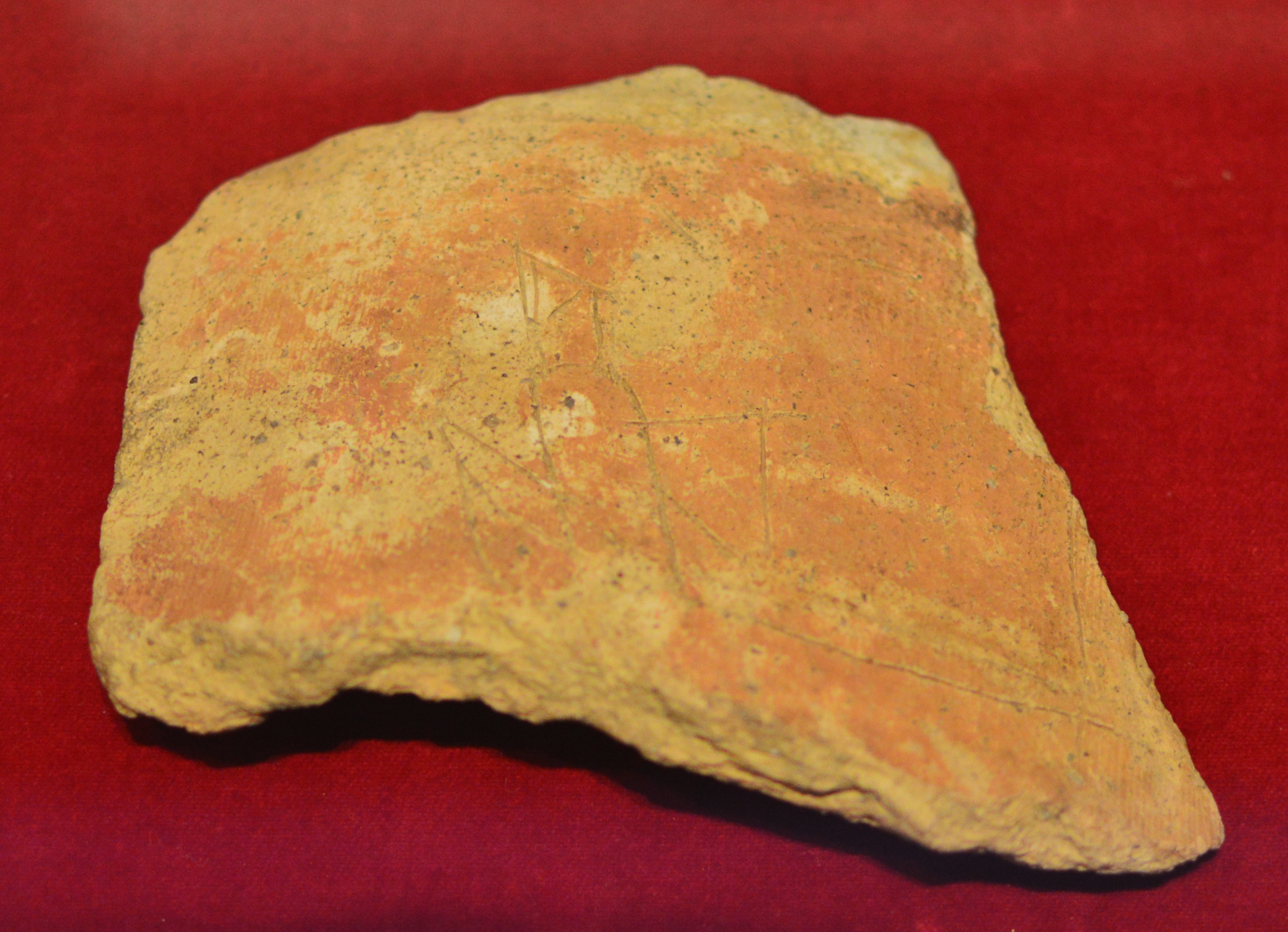
Fragment of haniwa with engraving of man on a boat

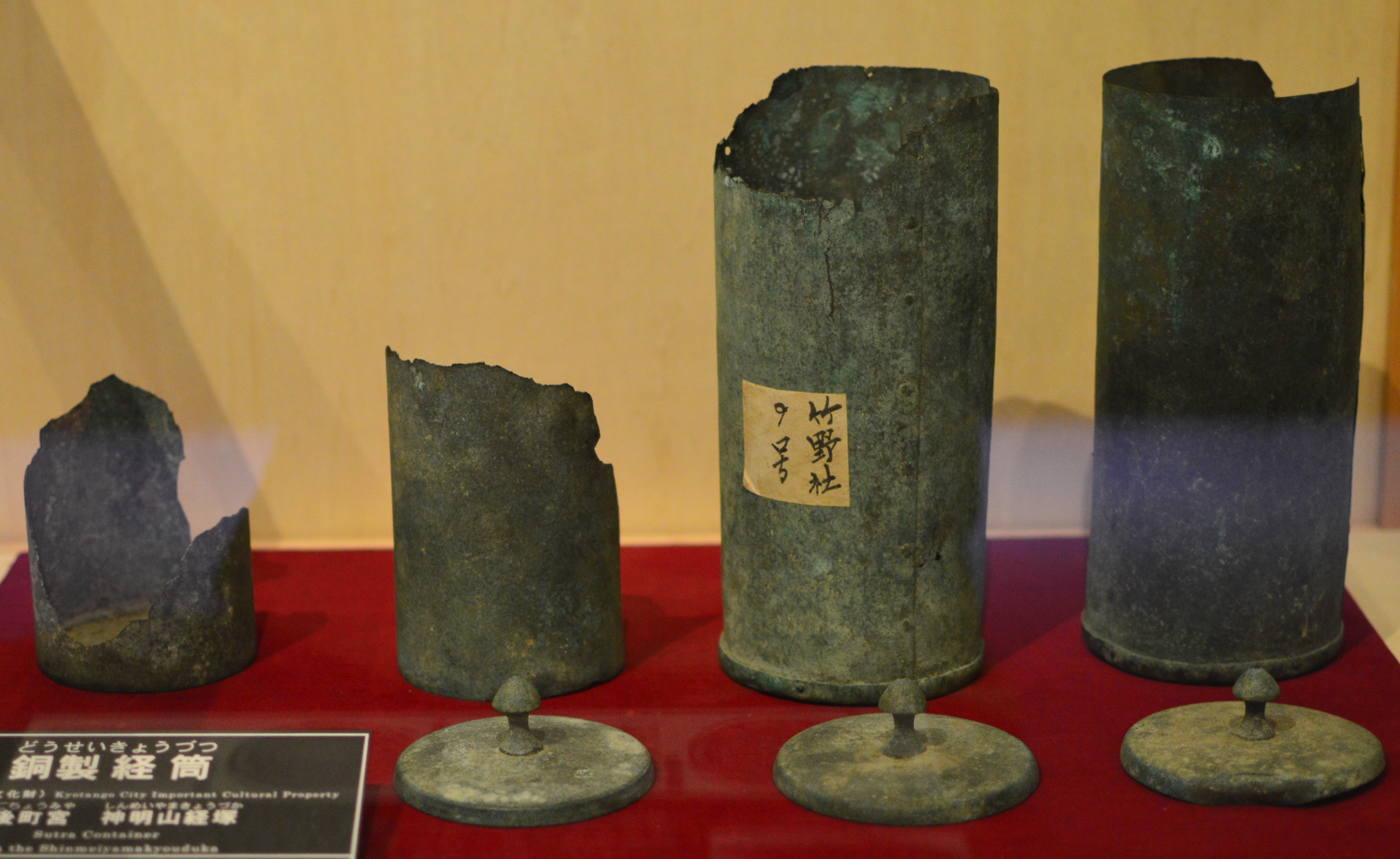
Artifacts recovered from sutra mound

== See also ==
- List of Historic Sites of Japan (Kyoto)
