= Amino Chōshiyama Kofun =

Historical burial mound in Kansai region of Japan

- 網野銚子山古墳 (Japanese)
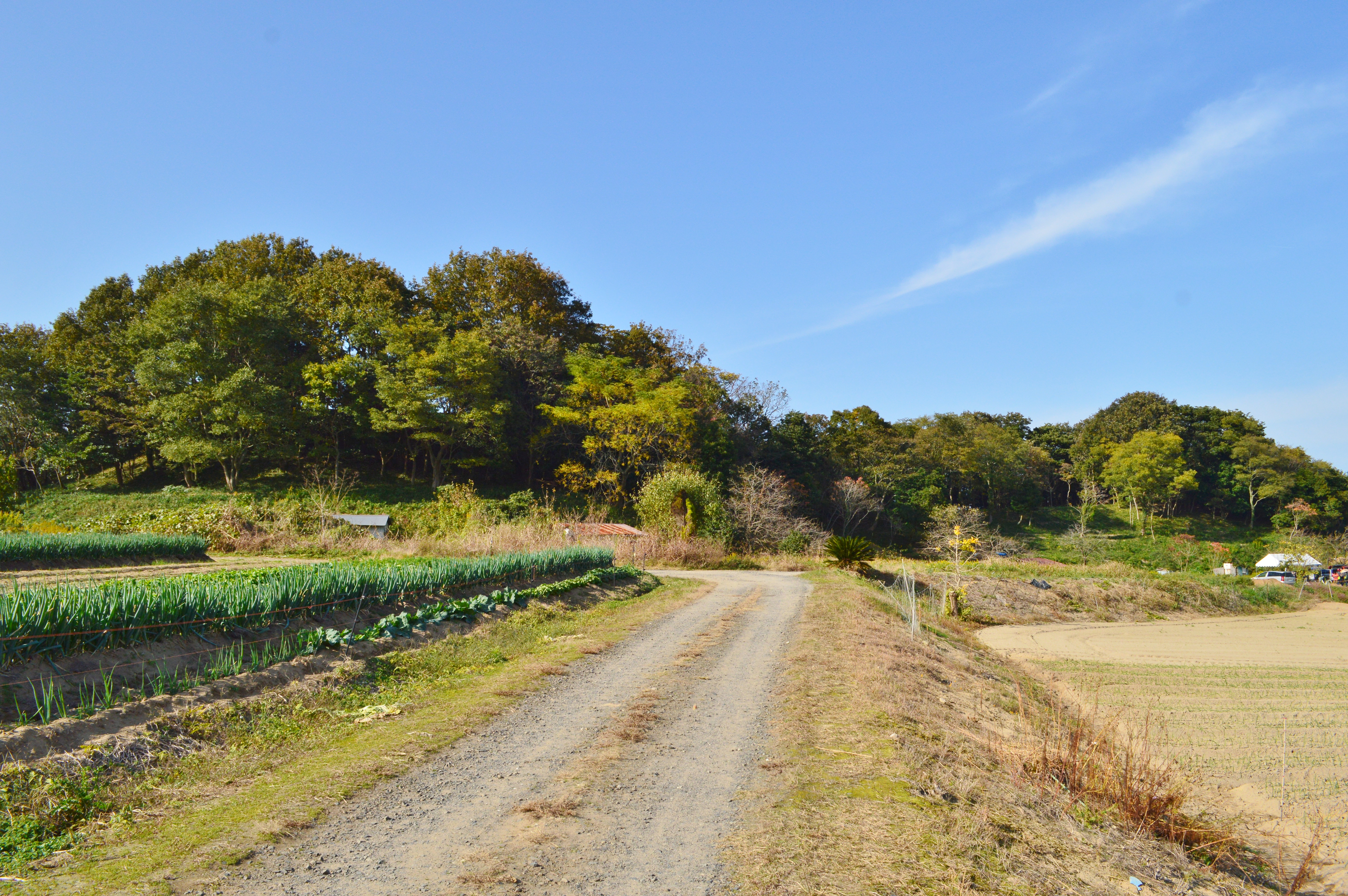
- Amino Chōshiyama Kofun

- Amino Chōshiyama Kofun Amino Chōshiyama Kofun (Japan)
- 35°40′41.20″N 135°01′48.00″E
- Type: Kofun
- Periods: Kofun period
- Location: Kyōtango, Kyoto, Japan
- Region: Kansai region

History
- Built: c.4th-5th century

Site notes
- Public access: Yes (No facilities)
- National Historic Site of Japan

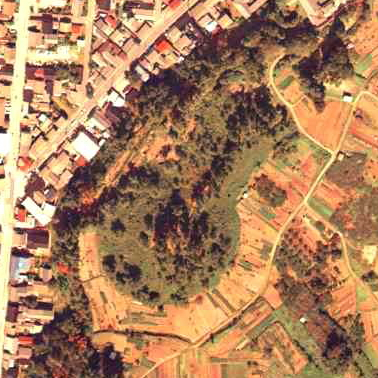
Aerial photograph

The Amino Chōshiyama Kofun (網野銚子山古墳) is a Kofun period burial mound, located in the Amino neighborhood of the city of Kyōtango, Kyoto in the Kansai region of Japan. The tumulus was designated a National Historic Site of Japan in 1922.

== Overview ==
The Amino Chōshiyama Kofun is a zenpō-kōen-fun (前方後円墳), which is shaped like a keyhole, having one square end and one circular end, when viewed from above. It is located on a hill at the mouth of the Fukuta River that flows through the Tango Peninsula into the Sea of Japan. It dates from the middle of the Kofun period, or the end of the 4th century to the beginning of the 5th century. The surrounding area has a number of Yayoi period and Kofun period remains. The tumulus is orientated to the north-northeast and has an overall length of 201 meters, making it one of the largest on the Sea of Japan coast. The surface of the mound was covered in white fukiishi, and both cylindrical and figurative haniwa have been found. Among the haniwa, fragments of a type specific to the Tango region have been found. In addition, the tumulus is surrounded by incomplete moats with a width of 17 to 25 meters on east, south and west sides. As no excavation has been conducted, the details of the burial chamber are not clear.

During the Kofun period, this region of northern Kyoto prefecture had trade contacts with the Asian mainland, and the area around the mouth of the Takeno River was the center of an ancient kingdom. The tumulus was situated such that its white fukiishi would be visible as a landmark for any ships approaching the harbor. However, after the middle of the 5th century, trade decreased and the political center of the region shifted inland to the Tamba region.

The tumulus is about ten minutes by car from Amino Station on the Miyazu Line.

The National Historic Site designation includes the smaller circular "Choshiyama Tumulus No. 1 and No. 2 Tumulus" nearby.

Total length
201 meters:
Anterior rectangular portion
80 meters wide x 10 meters high, 3-tier
Posterior circular portion
115 meter diameter x 16 meters high, 3-tiers

== Gallery ==
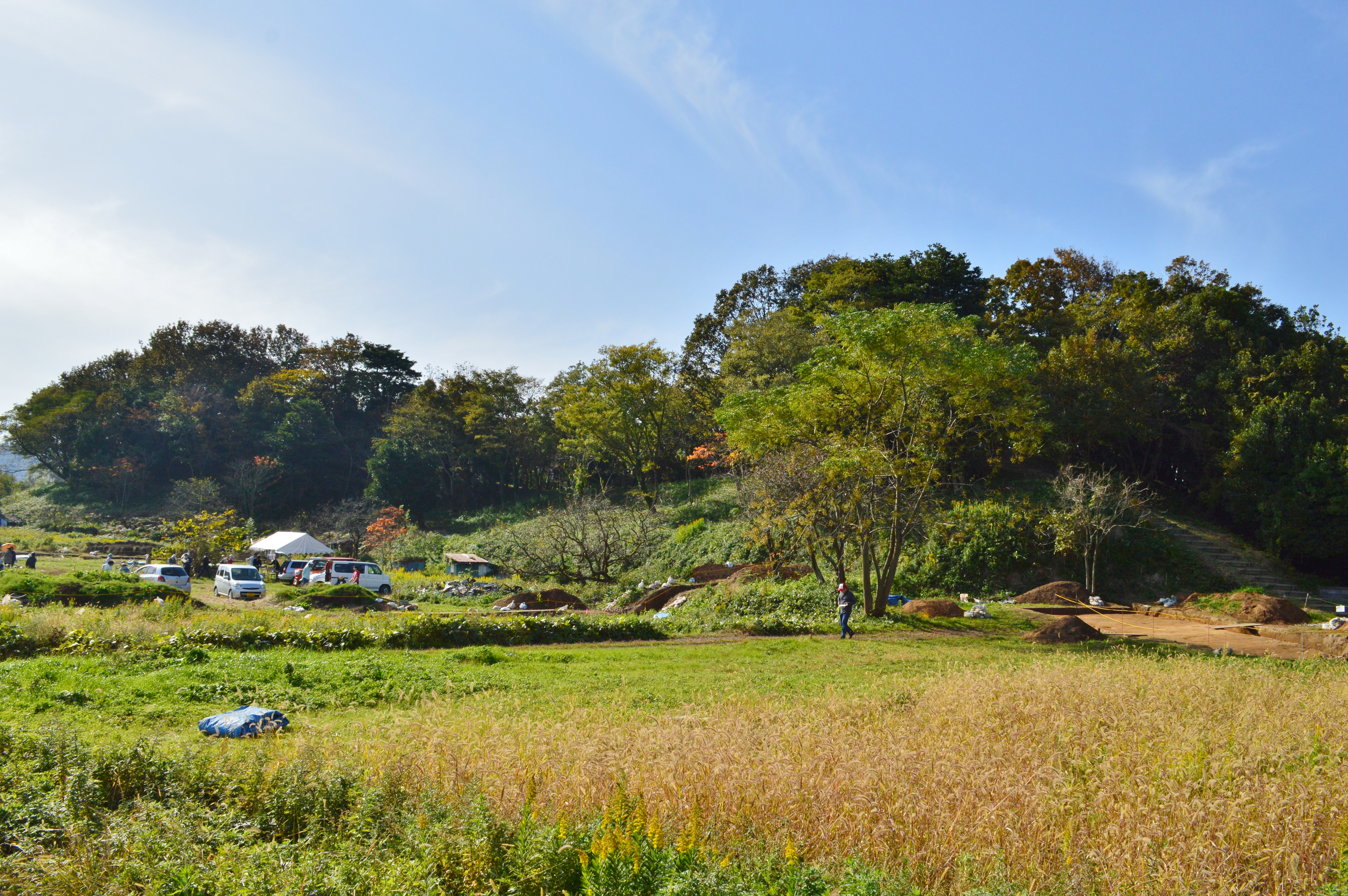
Panoramic view

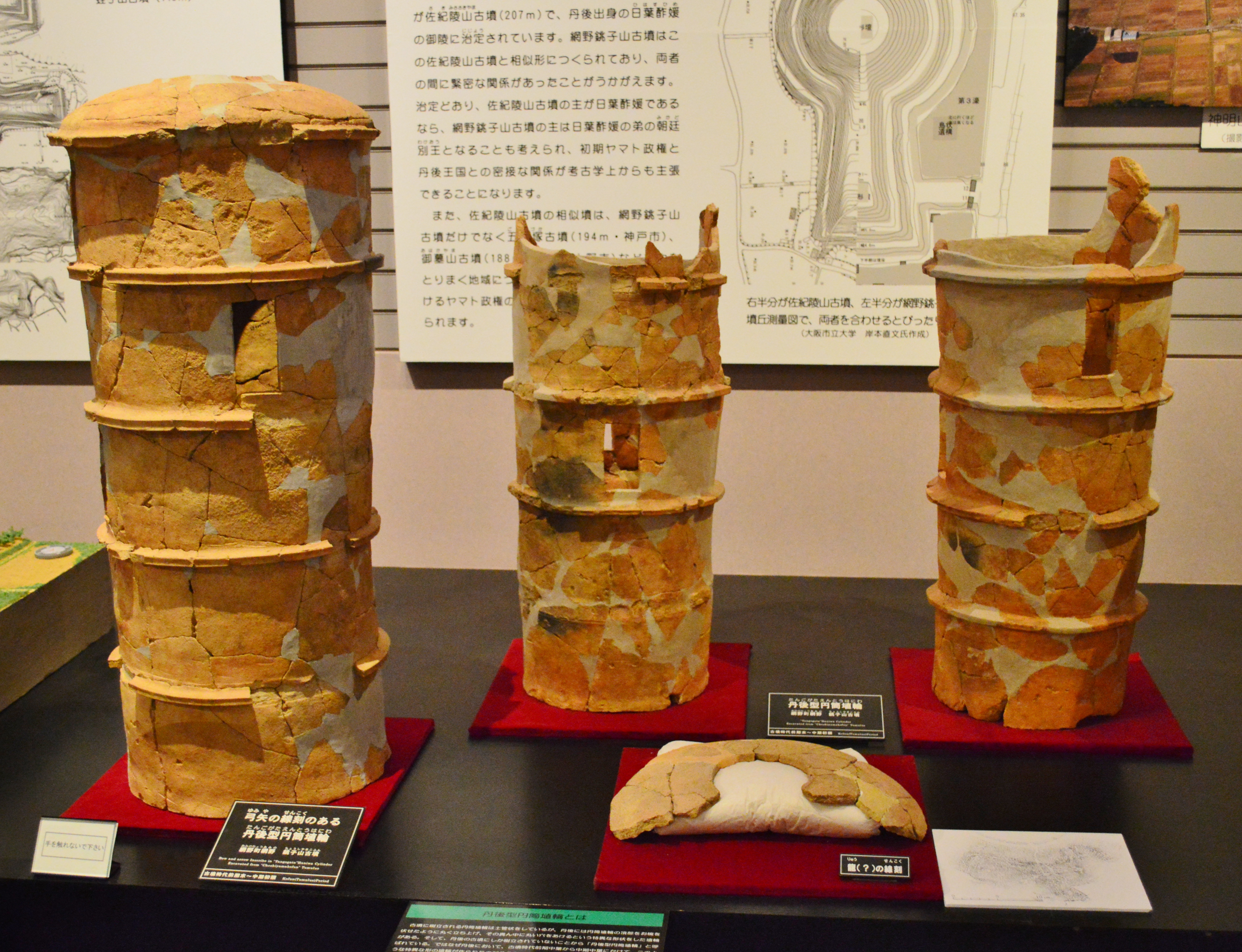
Haniwa from the Amino Chōshiyama Kofun

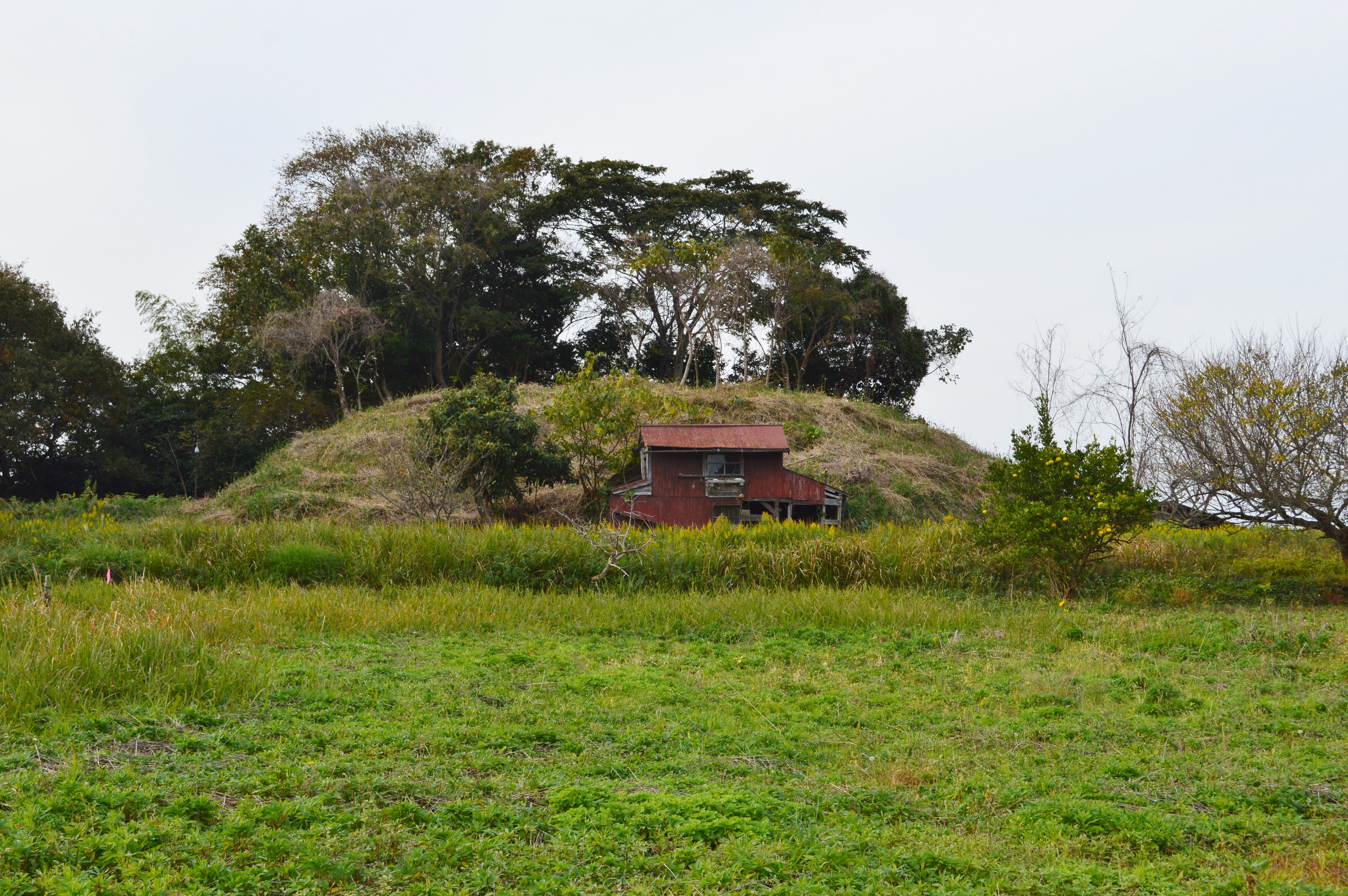
Choshiyama Tumulus No. 1

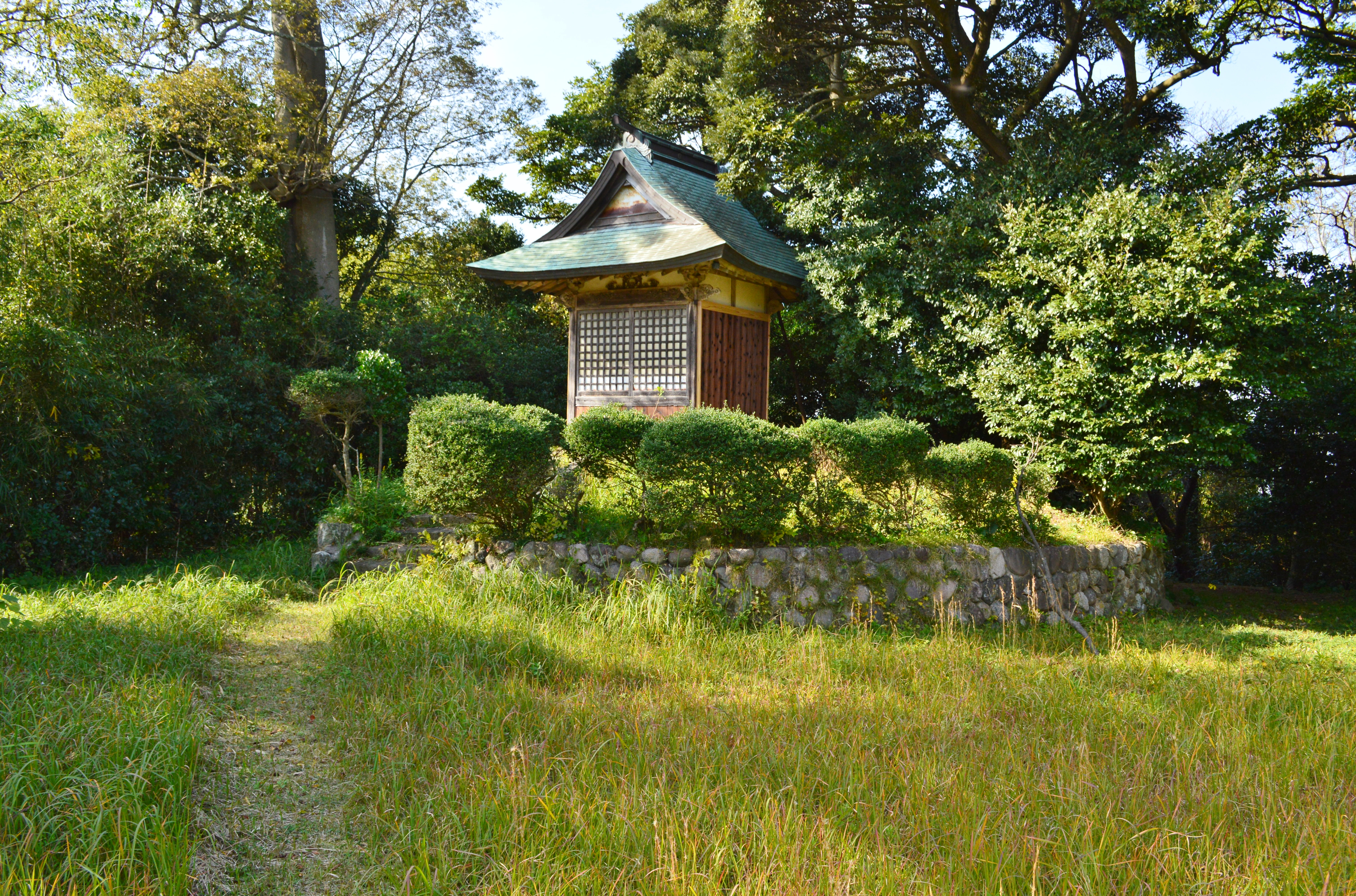
Choshiyama Tumulus No. 2

== See also ==
- List of Historic Sites of Japan (Kyoto)
