= Akasakaimai Tumuli =

- 赤坂今井墳墓 (Japanese)
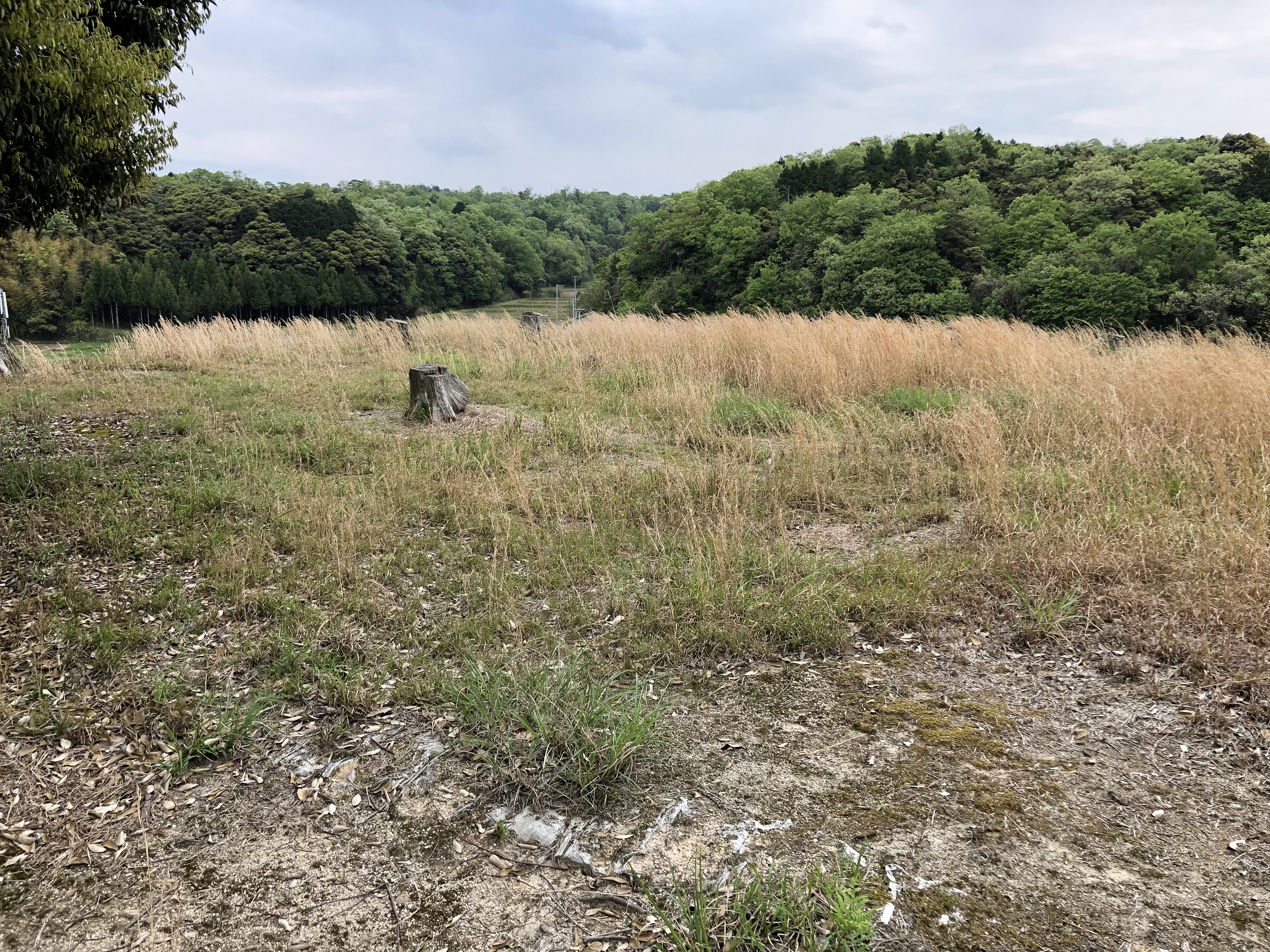
- Akasakaimai Tumuli

- Akasakaimai Tumuli Akasakaimai Tumuli (Japan)
- 35°38′36.0″N 135°03′02.0″E
- Type: Kofun
- Periods: Yayoi period
- Location: Kyōtango, Kyoto, Japan
- Region: Kansai region

History
- Built: c.3rd century

Site notes
- Public access: Yes (No facilities)
- National Historic Site of Japan

The Akasakaimai Tumuli (赤坂今井墳墓) is a late Yayoi period burial mound, located in the Mineyama neighborhood of the city of Kyōtango, Kyoto in the Kansai region of Japan. The tumulus was designated a National Historic Site of Japan in 2007.

== Overview ==
The Akasakaimai Tumuli is located near the confluence of the Fukuta and Takeno Rivers, on a hill overlooking a narrow valley. It is pyramid-shaped with a trapezoidal layout, and was constructed by the modification of a hill ridge extending from the west. The base of tumulus is 39 meters from north-to-south by 36 meters from east-to-west and has a height of four meters, and the top of the tumulus is 27 meters by 25 meters. Six burials have been confirmed on the flat surface at the top of the mound, and 19 on the flat surface at the foot of the mound (11 on the north side, 3 on the west side, 1 on the south side, and 4 on the east side), of which eleven have been completely excavated. Of these burials, nine had wooden caskets and four were in earthenware containers. The central burial is believed to be the first burial on the flat surface of the mound, and consisted of a square burial chamber 14 meters north–south and 10.5 meters east–west. The inside of the casket has not been investigated. On the west side of this grave were four pillar holes in the north and south, which are thought to be associated with the funeral procession. From the Yayoi pottery found in the excavation, the first burial dates from the end of the late Yayoi period. Pottery from many locations, including the Ikoma Mountains of Kawachi, the lower reaches of Sanuki and the Tokai region of Japanese were also excavated. In addition, from the 4th grave (which was constructed by cutting into the burial chamber of the first burial), a headdress with a pendant earring was recovered. The headdress contained jasper tubular and spherical beads, 30 green lead barium glass magatama, and Han purple and Han blue glass beads which had been imported from the Asian mainland were discovered. The casket in this fourth tomb was also coated in vermilion which had been made from cinnabar from mines in Ise. The excavated items were designated as Kyoto Prefecture designated tangible cultural properties in 2010.

The site was discovered during widening work on Kyoto Prefectural Road No. 17 and had long been believed to have been the ruins of a yamashiro-style Japanese castle constructed as an outlying fortification of Imai Castle from the Muromachi period; however, the preliminary survey found that it was actually a huge burial mound from the much earlier Yayoi period. Kyoto Prefecture decided to preserve the site by changing the method of road construction and Mineyama town acquired the site with the aim of developing an archaeological park in 1999. Excavations were conducted from 2000 to 2003.

The site is about ten minutes by car from Mineyama Station on the Miyazu Line of the Kyoto Tango Railway.

== Gallery ==
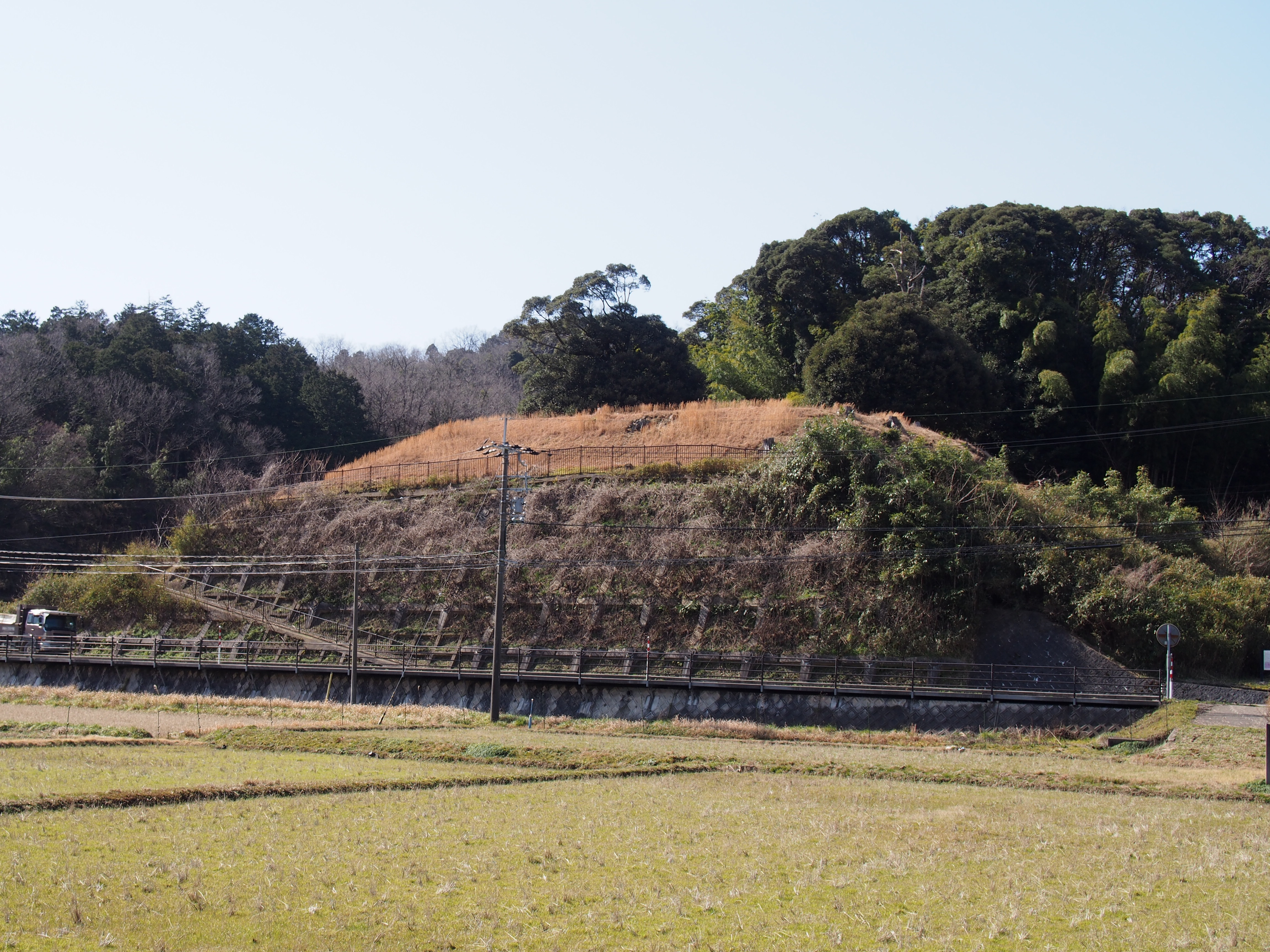
View from the east

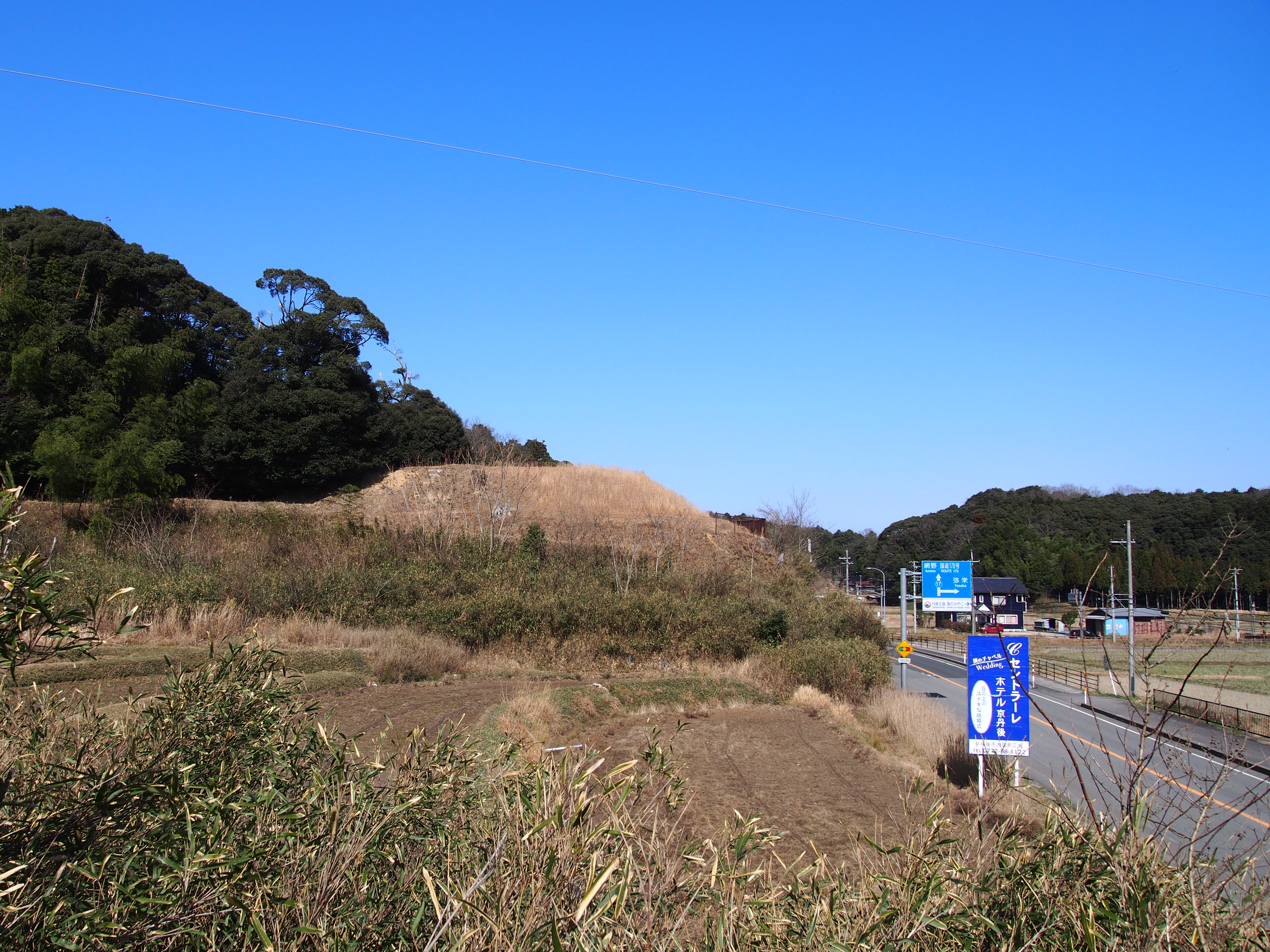
View from the south

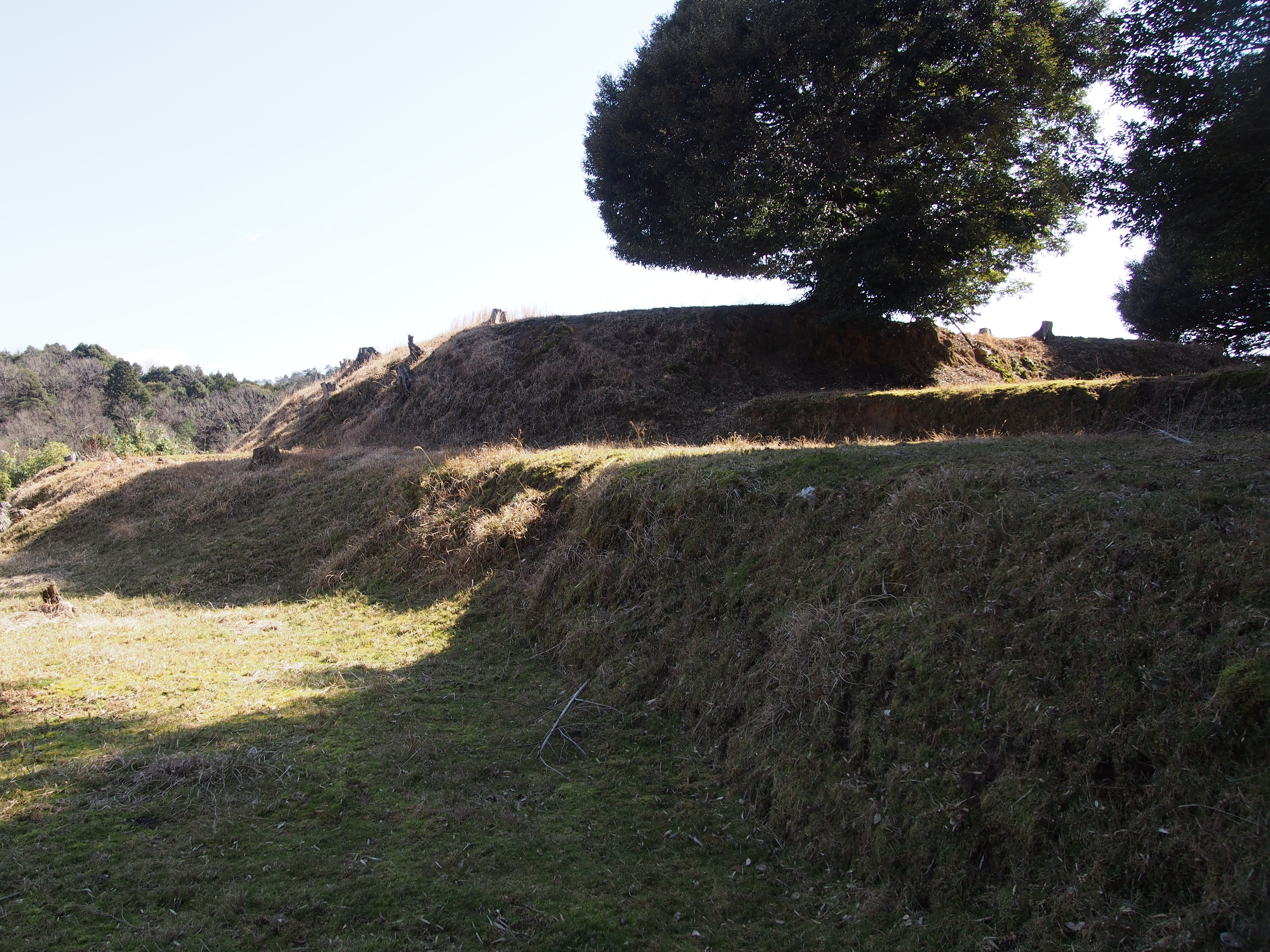
Northwest terrace

== See also ==
- List of Historic Sites of Japan (Kyoto)
