= Kyōtango =

Kyōtango 京丹後市
- City
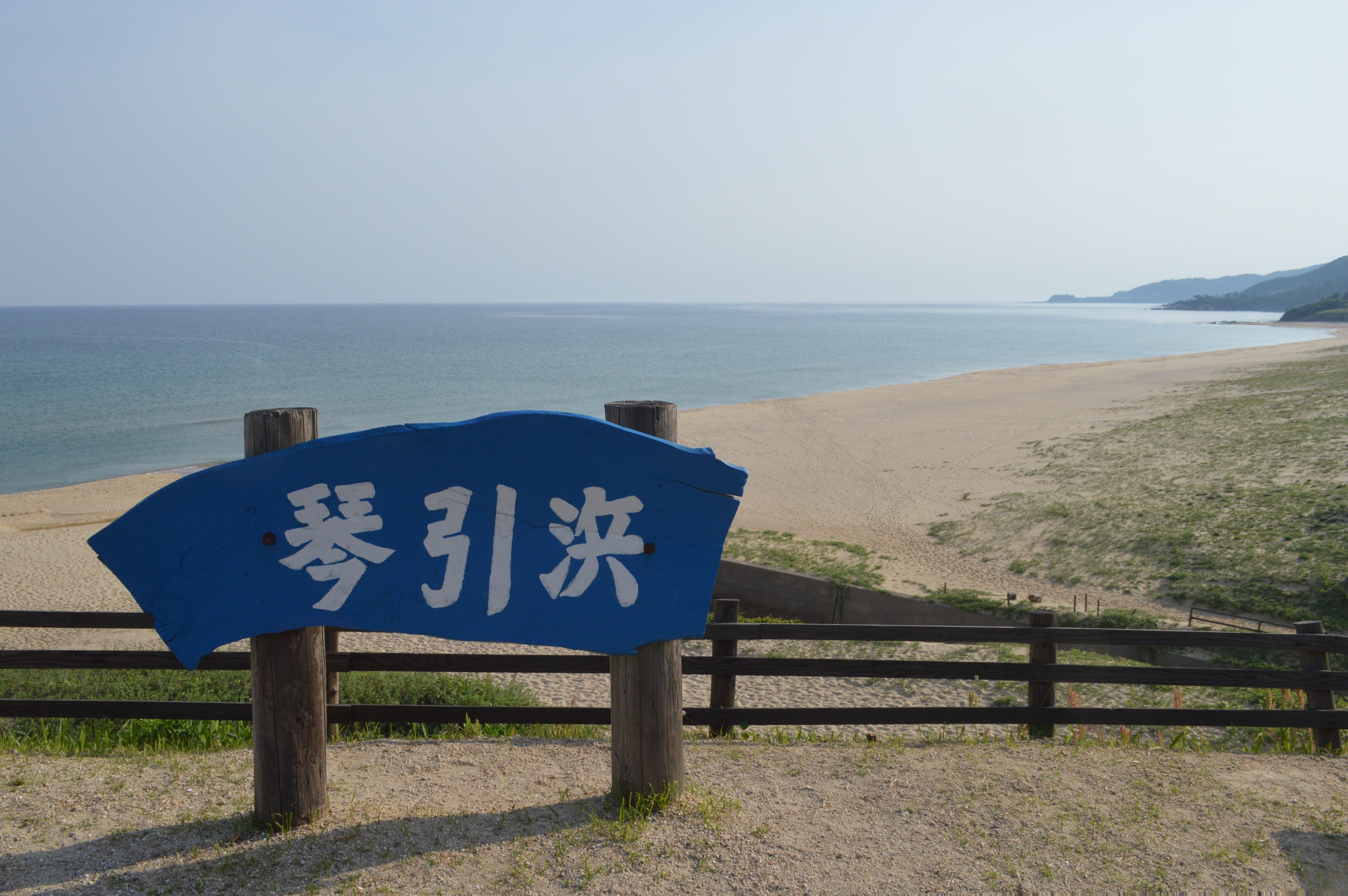
- Kotohiki Beach, National Place of Scenic Beauty and Natural Monument

- Flag Emblem

- Location of Kyōtango in Kyoto Prefecture

- Location in Japan
- Coordinates: 35°37′27″N 135°3′40″E
- Country: Japan
- Region: Kansai
- Prefecture: Kyoto

Government
  - Mayor: Yasushi Nakayama (since May 2020)

Area
  - Total: 501.43 km^{2} (193.60 sq mi)

Population (February 28, 2022)
  - Total: 52,683
  - Density: 105.07/km^{2} (272.12/sq mi)
- Time zone: UTC+09:00 (JST)
- City hall address: 889 Sugitani, Mineyama-chō, Kyōtango-shi, Kyoto-fu 627-8567
- Climate: Cfa
- Website: Official website
- Symbols
- Flower: Veronica omata
- Tree: Fagus crenata

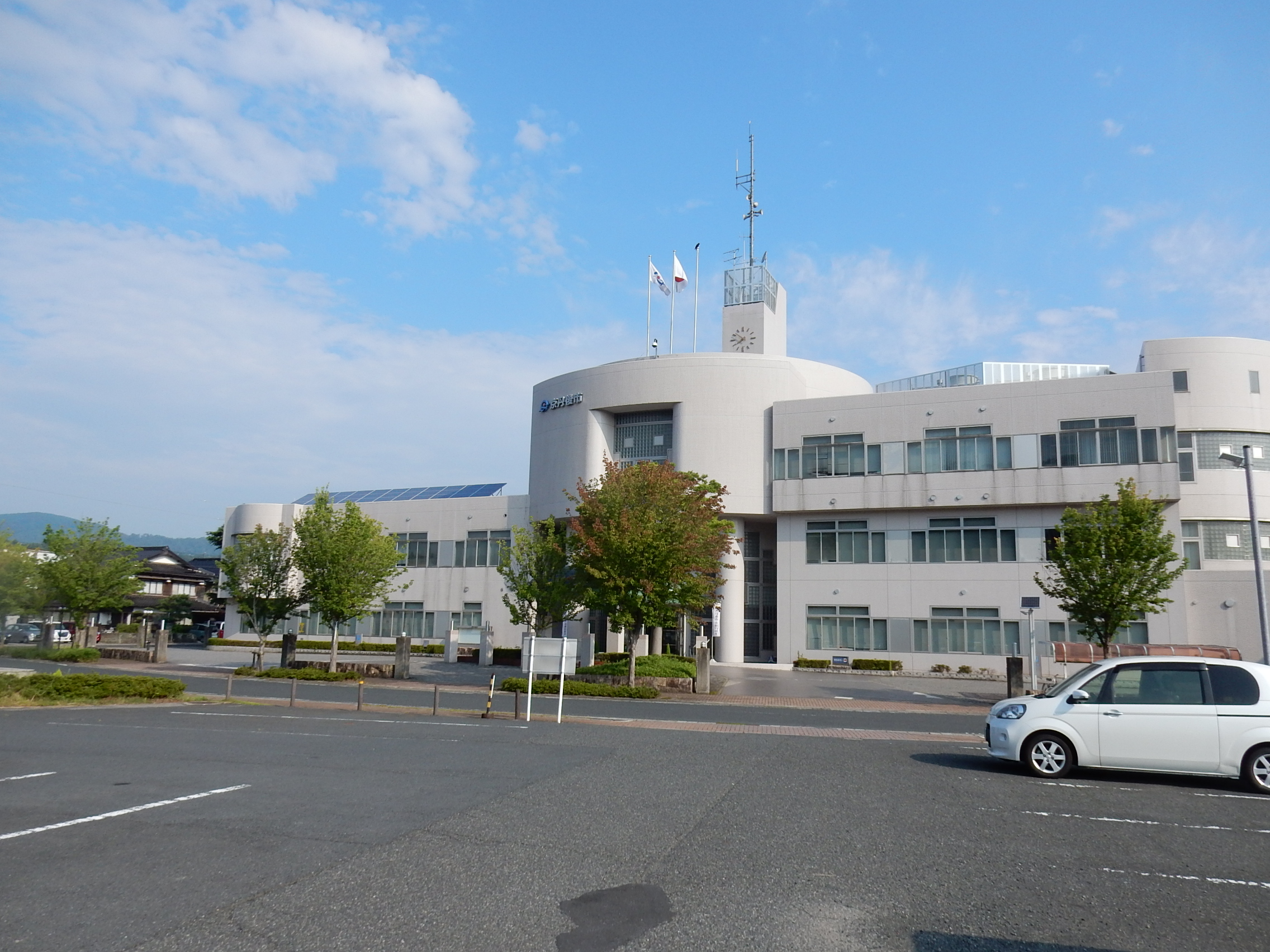
Kyotango cityhall

Kyōtango (京丹後市, Kyōtango-shi) is a city located in Kyoto Prefecture, Japan. As of 28 February 2022, the city had an estimated population of 52,683 in 22,886 households and a population density of 110 persons per km^{2}. The total area of the city is 601.43 square kilometres (232.21 sq mi).

== Geography ==
Kyōtango is located on the coast of the Sea of Japan on the western side of the Tango Peninsula in the northwestern corner of Kyoto Prefecture. The entire area of Kyōtango is in the eastern part of the San'in Kaigan Geopark.

=== Neighbouring municipalities ===
Hyōgo Prefecture

- Toyooka

Kyoto Prefecture

- Ine
- Miyazu
- Yosano

=== Climate ===
Kyōtango has a humid subtropical climate (Köppen Cfa) characterized by warm, wet summers and cold winters with heavy snowfall. The average annual temperature in Kyōtango is 15.4 °C (59.7 °F). The average annual rainfall is 1,899.1 mm (74.77 in) with December as the wettest month. The temperatures are highest on average in August, at around 26.9 °C (80.4 °F), and lowest in January, at around 5.3 °C (41.5 °F). Its record high is 37.9 °C (100.2 °F), reached on 22 August 2018, 26 July 2025, and 7 August 2026, and its record low is −5.9 °C (21.4 °F), reached on 26 February 1981.

Climate data for Kyōtango (1991−2020 normals, extremes 1977−present)
Month	Jan	Feb	Mar	Apr	May	Jun	Jul	Aug	Sep	Oct	Nov	Dec	Year
Record high °C (°F)	18.5 (65.3)	21.4 (70.5)	25.9 (78.6)	31.3 (88.3)	31.9 (89.4)	34.3 (93.7)	37.9 (100.2)	37.9 (100.2)	36.2 (97.2)	30.4 (86.7)	25.6 (78.1)	22.0 (71.6)	37.9 (100.2)
Mean daily maximum °C (°F)	7.9 (46.2)	8.4 (47.1)	11.8 (53.2)	17.1 (62.8)	21.7 (71.1)	24.6 (76.3)	28.7 (83.7)	30.5 (86.9)	26.2 (79.2)	21.0 (69.8)	15.9 (60.6)	10.7 (51.3)	18.7 (65.7)
Daily mean °C (°F)	5.3 (41.5)	5.5 (41.9)	8.2 (46.8)	13.1 (55.6)	17.6 (63.7)	21.1 (70.0)	25.3 (77.5)	26.9 (80.4)	23.2 (73.8)	18.2 (64.8)	13.1 (55.6)	7.9 (46.2)	15.4 (59.8)
Mean daily minimum °C (°F)	2.7 (36.9)	2.7 (36.9)	5.0 (41.0)	9.5 (49.1)	14.1 (57.4)	18.3 (64.9)	22.8 (73.0)	24.2 (75.6)	20.6 (69.1)	15.5 (59.9)	10.3 (50.5)	5.2 (41.4)	12.6 (54.6)
Record low °C (°F)	−5.1 (22.8)	−5.9 (21.4)	−3.0 (26.6)	1.0 (33.8)	6.7 (44.1)	11.7 (53.1)	16.3 (61.3)	18.5 (65.3)	14.1 (57.4)	4.9 (40.8)	0.7 (33.3)	−3.4 (25.9)	−5.9 (21.4)
Average precipitation mm (inches)	222.1 (8.74)	125.4 (4.94)	123.7 (4.87)	99.3 (3.91)	120.4 (4.74)	141.8 (5.58)	170.6 (6.72)	117.7 (4.63)	198.0 (7.80)	138.9 (5.47)	154.7 (6.09)	264.9 (10.43)	1,899.1 (74.77)
Average precipitation days (≥ 1.0 mm)	22.8	16.7	14.5	11.1	10.7	10.9	12.1	8.9	11.9	11.7	15.5	21.6	168.4
Mean monthly sunshine hours	51.0	79.5	141.4	188.1	205.8	162.9	178.4	220.9	152.7	141.8	99.2	63.7	1,692.5
Source: Japan Meteorological Agency

== Demographics ==
Per Japanese census data, the population of Kyōtango peaked around 1950 and has been slowly declining since.

Historical population
Year	Pop.	±%
1920	72,135	—
1930	73,478	+1.9%
1940	75,524	+2.8%
1950	83,001	+9.9%
1960	80,106	−3.5%
1970	75,187	−6.1%
1980	72,966	−3.0%
1990	69,085	−5.3%
2000	65,578	−5.1%
2010	59,044	−10.0%
2020	50,860	−13.9%

== History ==
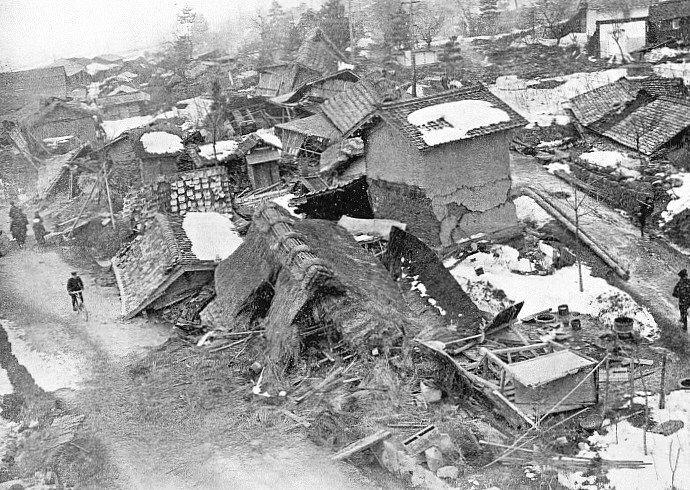
The 1927 Kita Tango earthquake devastated the Mineyama area, present day of part of Kyōtango

The area of Kyōtango was a major cultural center during the Yayoi and Kofun periods, and had direct trade contacts with the Asian mainland. Numerous burial mounds were constructed, including the Amino Chōshiyama Kofun, which is one of the largest kofun on the coast of the Sea of Japan. The Mineyama neighborhood was the center of ancient Tanba Province in the early 8th century, and became the center of Tango Province after that province was separated from Tanba in 713. During the Muromachi period, the area was under the control of the Isshiki clan, who were replaced by the Kyōgoku clan by the Edo Period Tokugawa shogunate. A cadet branch of the Kyōgoku clan ruled Mineyama Domain until the Meiji restoration, with some portions of the area under the direction control of the Shogunate and ruled from the Kumihama daikansho in the Kumihama neighborhood. The villages of Amino, Tango and Yasaka

With the creation of the modern municipalities system on April 1, 1889 the villages of Mineyama and Omiya (in Naka District), Amino, Tango, and Yasaka (in Takeno District), and Kumihama (in Kumano District) were created. All were subsequently raised to town status. The 1927 Kita Tango earthquake caused major damage in the region and killed around 3,000 people. The city of Kyōtango was established on April 1, 2004, from the merger of these six municipalities with the former Mineyama town hall as the new city hall. Naka, Takeno, and Kumano Districts were dissolved as a result of the merger.

== Government ==
Kyōtango has a mayor-council form of government with a directly elected mayor and a unicameral city council of 22 members. Kyōtango contributes one member to the Kyoto Prefectural Assembly. In terms of national politics, the city is part of Kyoto 5th district of the lower house of the Diet of Japan.

=== Military facilities ===
The Japan Air Self-Defense Force maintains a facility in the city called the Kyogamisaki Sub-Base. It is part of the Basic Air Defense Ground Environment. The Kyogamisaki Communications Site, a United States Army Japan missile monitoring station, is located nearby.

== Economy ==
Kyōtango has mostly a rural economy based agriculture and commercial fishing. Mineyama, now part of Kyōtango, has a close connection with the Hagoromo legend. The Kumihama area is well known for its many hot springs, while Amino is one of the major producers of Tango Chirimen cloth.

== Education ==
Kyōtango has 17 public elementary schools and six public middle schools operated by the city government and five public high schools operated by the Kyoto Prefectural Department of Education. A campus of the Kyoto Institute of Technology and a campus of the Kyoto Seika University are also located in the city.

== Transportation ==
=== Railway ===
Kyoto Tango Railway – Miyazu Line

- Kyōtango-Ōmiya - Mineyama - Amino - Yūhigaura-Kitsu-onsen - Shōtenkyō - Kabutoyama - Kumihama

=== Highway ===
- San'in Kinki Expressway
- National Route 178
- National Route 312
- National Route 482

== Sister cities ==
- Bozhou, Anhui Province, China, since October 11, 2006

== Local attractions ==
=== National Historic Sites ===
- Akasakaimai Tumuli
- Amino Chōshiyama Kofun
- Hakoishihama Site
- Shinmeiyama Kofun
- Ubusunayama Kofun

=== National Place of Scenic Beauty ===
- Kotohiki Beach

== Notable people from Kyōtango ==
Kyōtango was home to Jiroemon Kimura who was born in the city in 1897. He was the world's oldest living man since April 2011, the oldest living person in Japan since December 2011 and as of December 17, 2012, was the world's oldest verified living person. Kimura lived in Kyōtango his entire life and was said to have recollections of the 1927 earthquake. He spoke of his memories of surviving the earthquake on his 114th birthday. On December 28, 2012, Kimura became the oldest verified man in history, but he died on June 12, 2013.

Other people who were born in, residents of, or otherwise closely associated with Kyōtango include:

- Shoko Hamada (born 1986, in Kumihama), tarento, gravure idol, and race queen.
- Kenji Inoue (born 1976, in Amino), bronze medalist for Wrestling at the Summer Olympics in 2004.
- Shinsuke Nakamura (born 1980, in Mineyama), professional wrestling star.
- Katsuya Nomura (born 1935, in Amino), baseball player and manager.
- Michiko Shimizu (born 1970, in Amino), retired long-distance runner who mainly competed in the 5000 metres. She finished fourth at the 1996 Summer Olympics in Atlanta.
- Yosuke Tagawa (born 1959, in Ōmiya), actor, tarento, and former idol singer.
- Sohsuke Takatani (born 1989, in Amino), amateur middleweight freestyle wrestler.
- Kyōgoku Takatomi (born 1835), a Japanese daimyō of the late Edo period, who ruled the Mineyama Domain of Tango Province.
- Unchain, rock band formed in Kyōtango in 1996.
