= Hakoishihama Site =

Archaeological site in Japan

Hakoishihama site
- 函石浜遺物包含地 (Japanese)
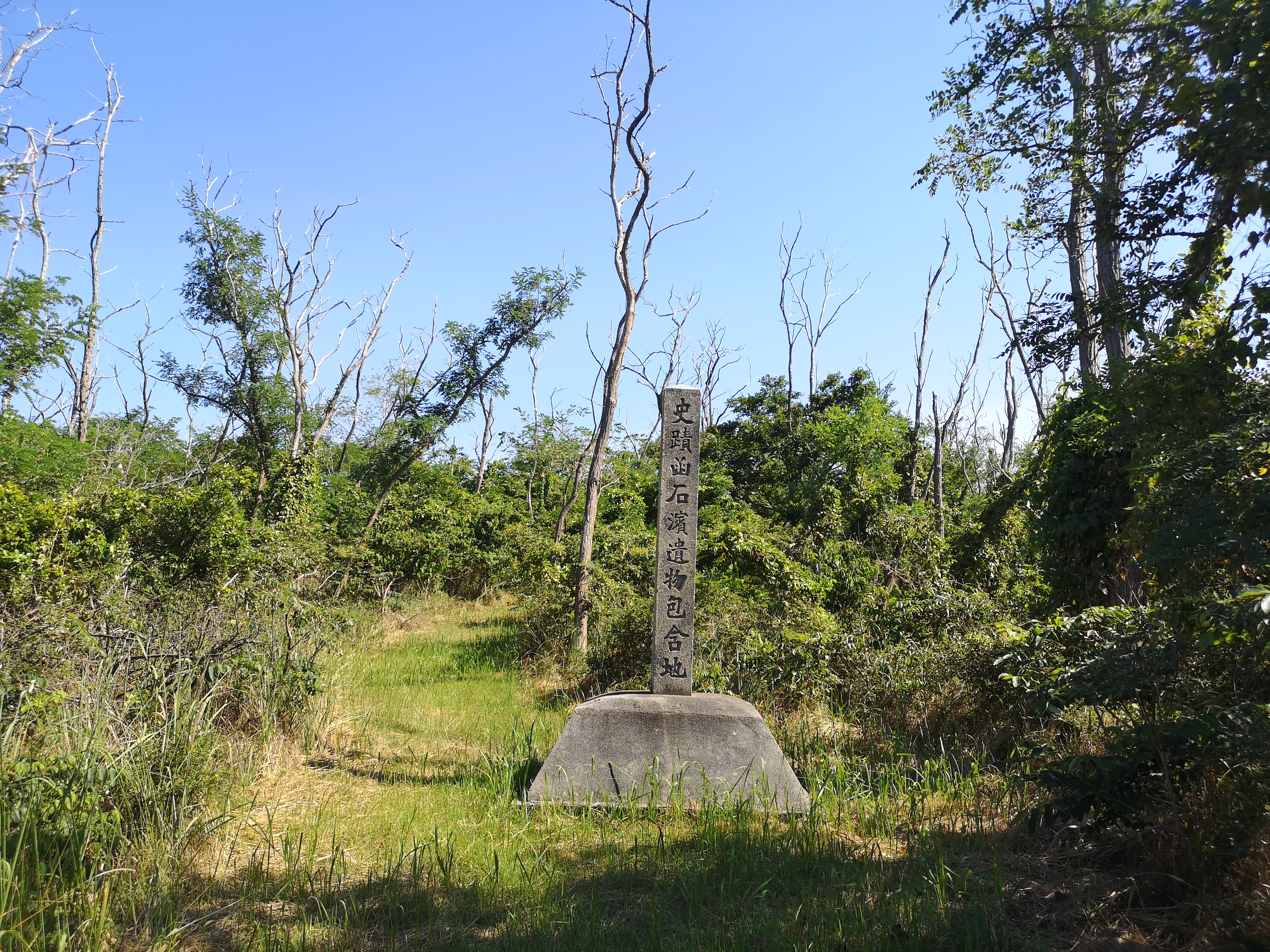
- Hakoishihama site

- Hakoishihama site Hakoishihama Site (Japan)
- 35°38′59.4″N 134°56′23.8″E
- Type: settlement ruin
- Periods: Yayoi period
- Location: Kyōtango, Kyoto, Japan
- Region: Kansai region

Site notes
- Public access: Yes (No facilities)

The Hakoishihama site (函石浜遺物包含地, Hakoishihama iseki hōgan-chi) is a complex archaeological site located in the Kumihama neighborhood of the city of Kyōtango, Kyoto in the Kansai region of Japan. The site contains artifacts ranging from the Jōmon through Muromachi period, with the bulk of artifacts coming from the Yayoi period. It was designated a National Historic Site of Japan in 1921.

== Overview ==
The Hakoishihama site is located on a coastal sand terrance overlooking the Sea of Japan coast. It covers an area of approximately 25 hectares, or one kilometer from east-to-west by up to 600 meters north-to-south, and is within the Sanin Kaigan National Park. The sea was previously covered by dense Japanese black pine forests, which were largely destroyed by collection of pine sap during World War II, although reforestation attempts have been progressing into the 1970s. The bed of the Sakotani River, which at present turns at a right angle into Kumihama Town and flows into Kumihama Bay in the southwest, previously flowed directly into the Sea of Japan at this point, and it is believed that an ancient settlement existed at the river mouth.

The site was known to local antiquarians from the late 19th century, who collected surface artifacts which had been exposed by wind and the shifting sands. It was first introduced to academia in the miscellaneous notes of "Tokyo Anthropology Magazine" No. 147 published on June 28, 1898. It drew attention primarily from its large quantities of Yayoi period artifacts, including stone spearheads, grinding balls, iron slag, and both finished and unfinished beads, as well as fragments of Chinese ceramics and coins, including that this was both an industrial site and also a site of trade with the Asian mainland. One of the most notable discoveries occurred in 1903, when two coins of the short-lived Chinese Xin dynasty (9 to 23 AD) were discovered with Yayoi pottery, confirming trade with China during this period. Although the site is preserved, no actual archaeological excavations have hardly been conducted and what is known about the ruins is limited to surface materials. Cylindrical and figurative haniwa were also excavated.

The site is about a ten-minute drive from Shōtenkyō Station on the Kyoto Tango Railway Miyazu Line.

== Gallery ==
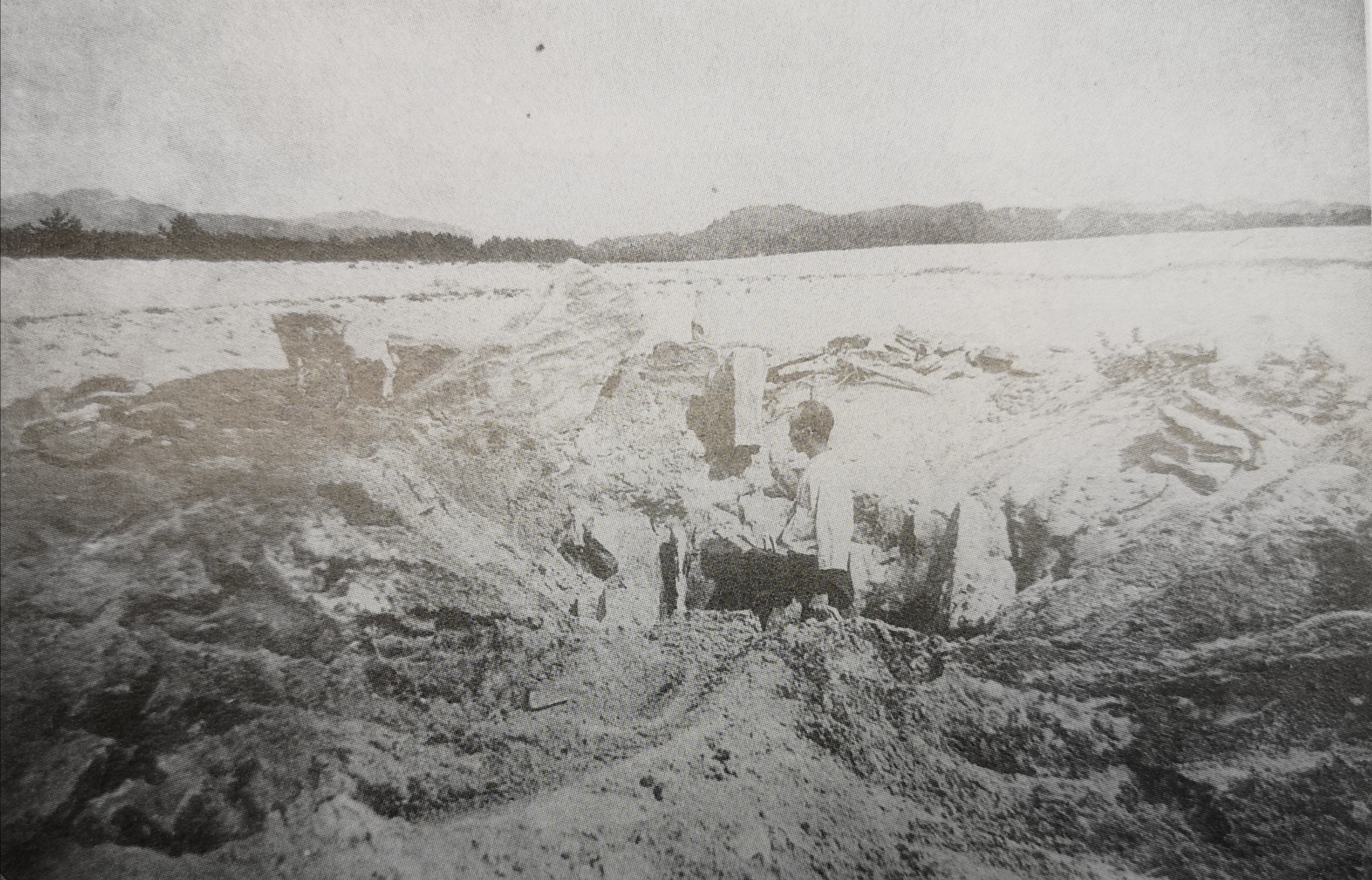
Hakoishikama in 1922

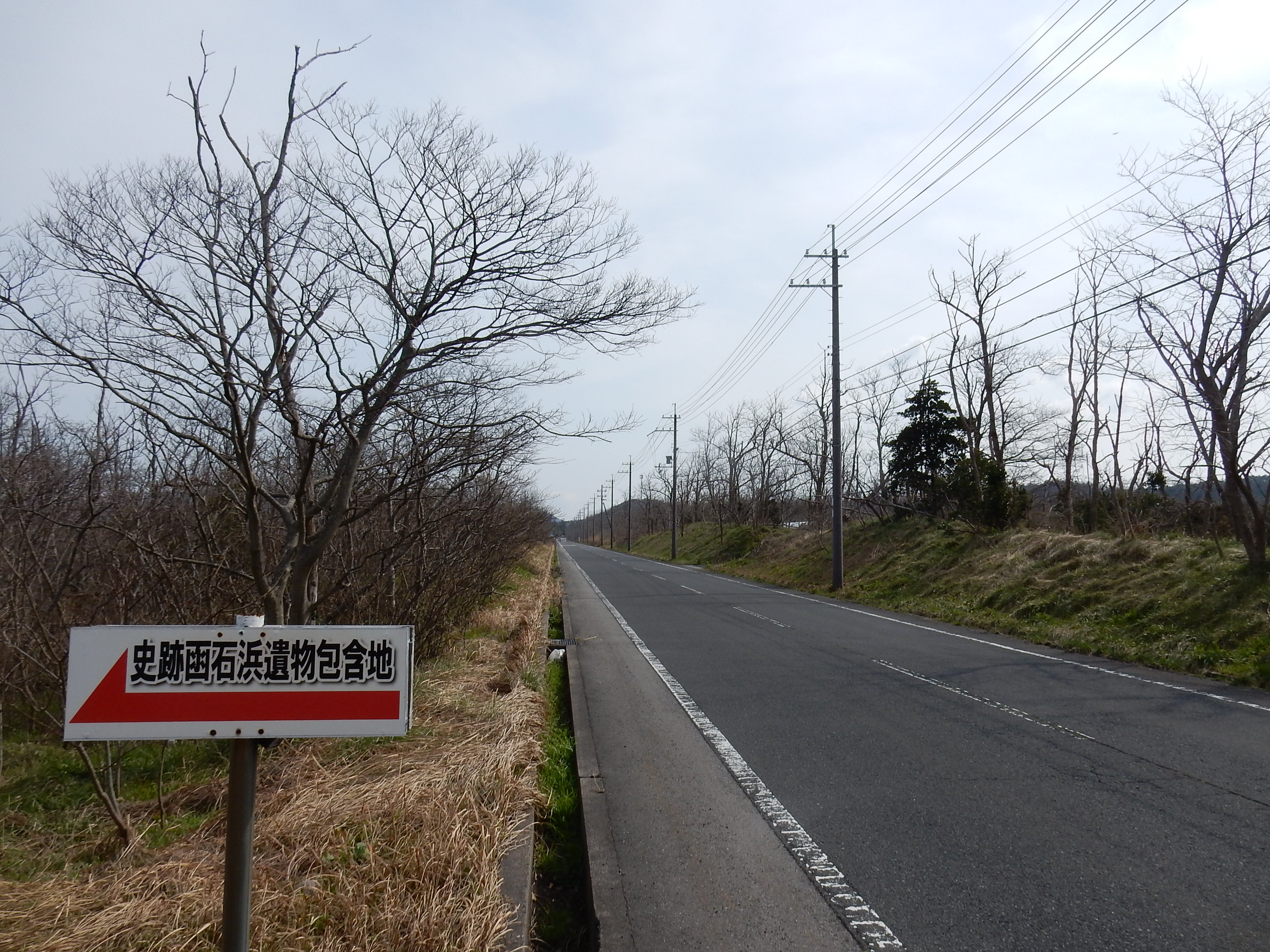
Entry to the site

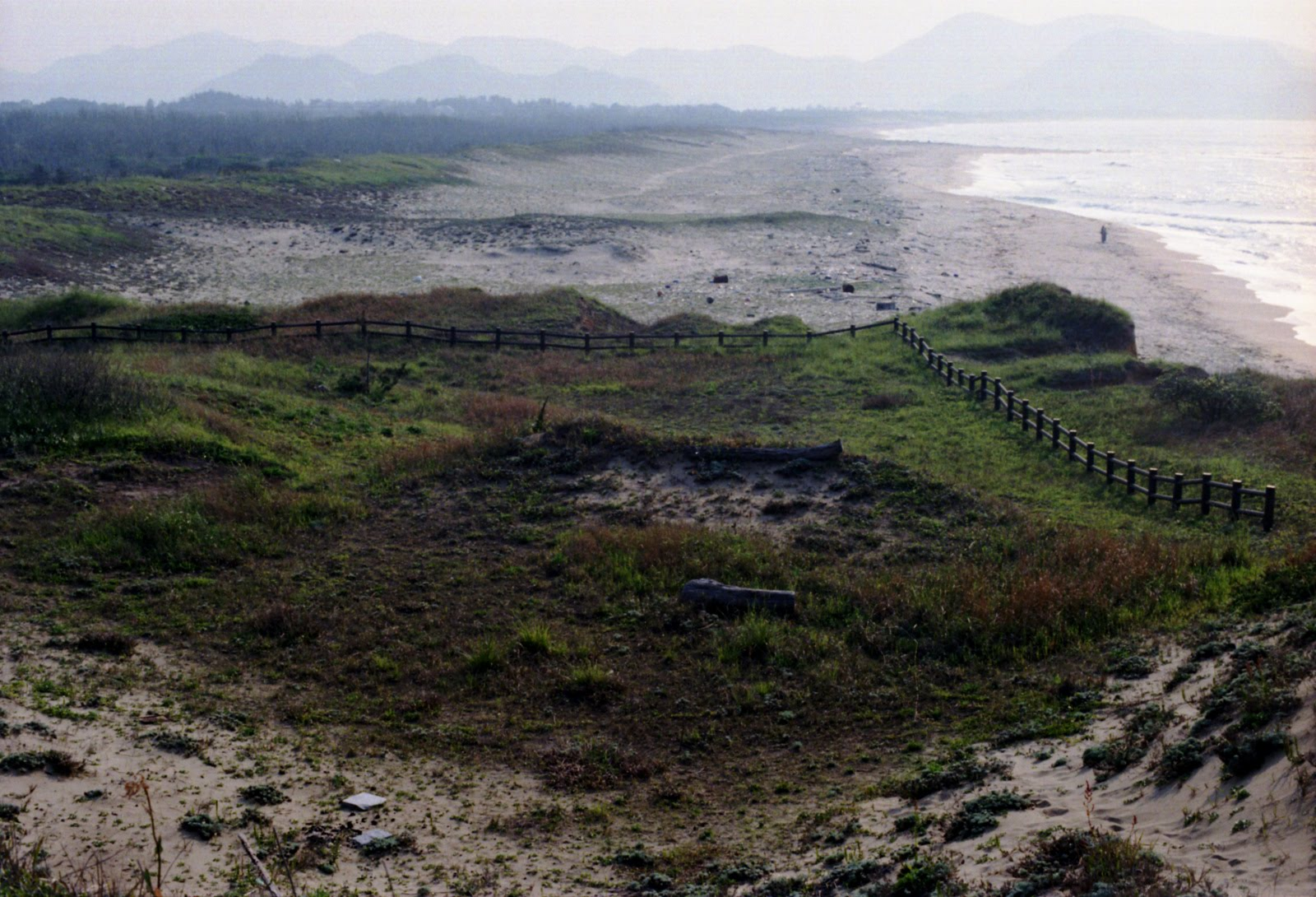
Panorama

== See also ==
- List of Historic Sites of Japan (Kyoto)
