= Ubusunayama Kofun =

- 産土山古墳 (Japanese)
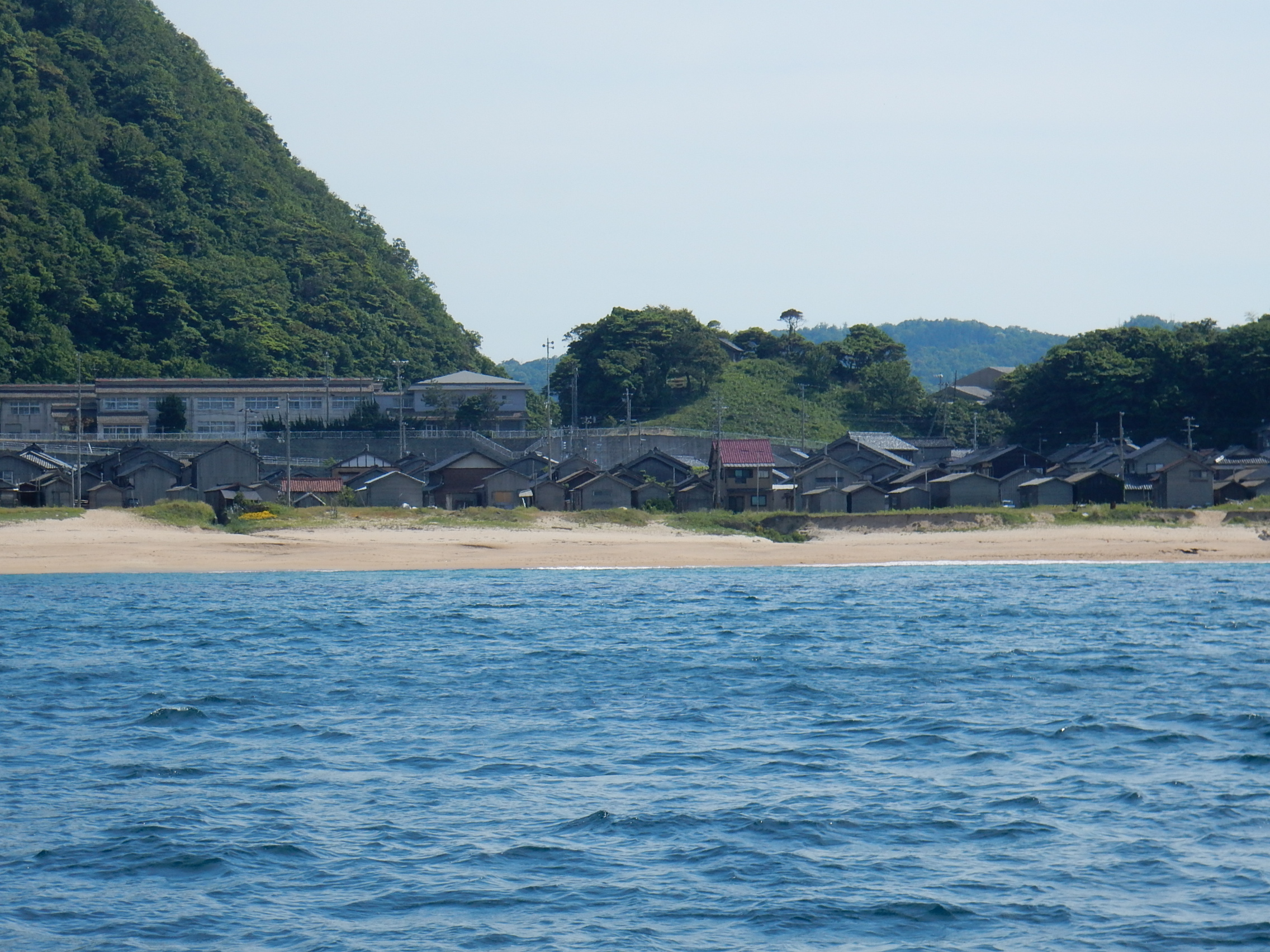
- Ubusunayama Kofun

- Ubusunayama Kofun Ubusunayama Kofun (Japan)
- Interactive map of Ubusunayama Kofun
- 35°44′29.2″N 135°06′43″E
- Type: Kofun
- Periods: Kofun period
- Location: Kyōtango, Kyoto, Japan
- Region: Kansai region

History
- Built: c.5th century

Site notes
- Public access: Yes (No facilities)

The Ubusunayama Kofun (産土山古墳) is a Kofun period burial mound, located in the Tangochomiya neighborhood of the city of Kyōtango, Kyoto in the Kansai region of Japan. The tumulus was designated a National Historic Site of Japan in 1973.

== Overview ==
The Ubusunayama Kofun is an enpun (円墳)-style circular burial mound. It is located on the saddle of a hill at the mouth of the Takeno River, in the center of the west coast of the Tango Peninsula overlooking the Sea of Japan. It dates from the middle of the Kofun period, or the middle of the 5th century. It was first excavated in 1939, during which time a tuff sarcophagus was discovered directly buried in the upper part of the central part of the mound with the main axis in the east-west direction. Grave goods included bronze mirrors, magatama, tubular beads and round glass beads, iron swords with ring or deer horn hilts, and wooden bows. The northern half of the mound collapsed due to flood damage in 1953. For this reason and due to legal issues with property ownership, when the National Historic Site designation was granted in 1957, only the portion of the tumulus located within the grounds of the neighboring Shinto shrine were designated, and the portion on private land on the western side of the tumulus was not. After a more extensive archaeological survey was conducted from 1995 to 1996, the true size of the tumulus was determined to be 54 meters in diameter. In December 1998, the borders of the National Historic Site designation were modified to include some finds from this survey, and to exclude a portion of the area outside the mound. Cylindrical and figurative haniwa were also excavated.

The site is about a 20-minute drive from Mineyama Station on the Kyoto Tango Railway Miyazu Line.

== Gallery ==
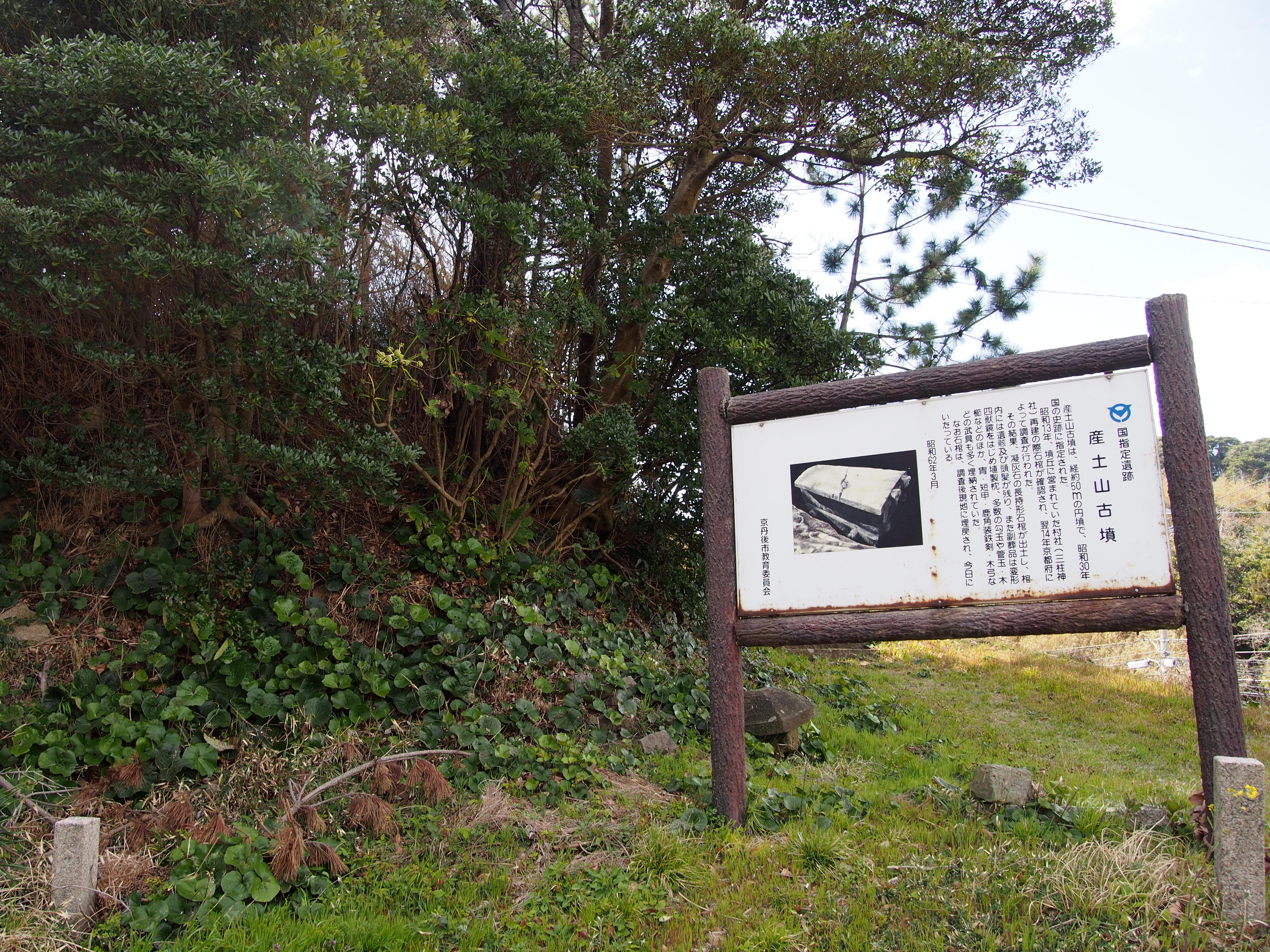
Descriptive placard

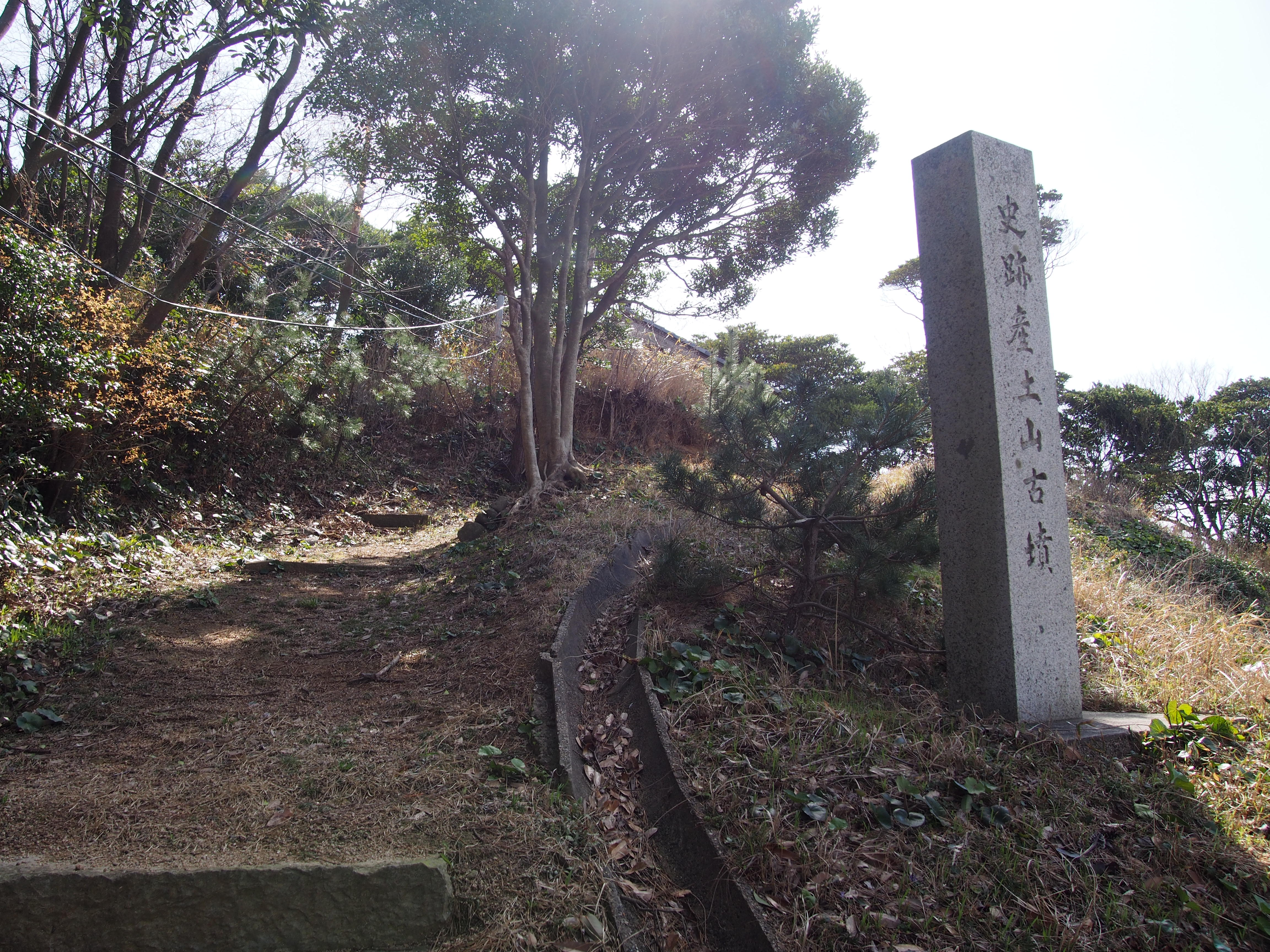
National Historic Site monument

== See also ==
- List of Historic Sites of Japan (Kyoto)
