= Kotohiki Beach =

Beach in Kyotango, Japan

Coordinates: 35°41′59″N 135°02′31″E

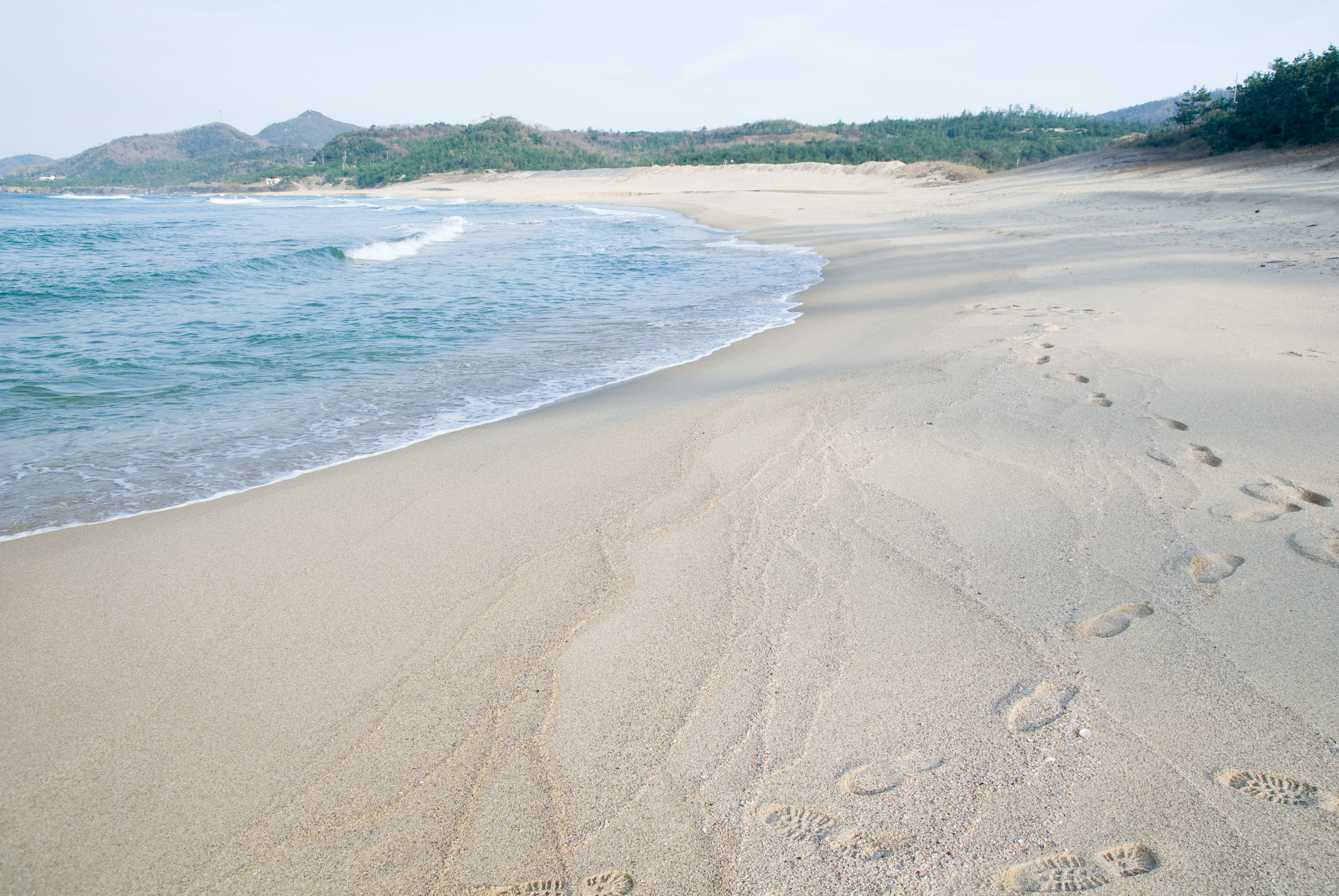
Kotohiki beach

Kotohiki Beach (琴引浜, Kotohikihama) is located in Kyōtango, Kyōto Prefecture, Japan. It is a nationally designated Natural Monument and Place of Scenic Beauty, and forms part of the Tango-Amanohashidate-Ōeyama Quasi-National Park. In 1996, the Ministry of the Environment selected the sound of the sands as one of the 100 Soundscapes of Japan. Its name refers to playing the koto stringed musical instrument.

== See also ==
- Koto
- The 100 Views of Nature in Kansai
- Singing sand
