= Arikoyama Castle =

Castle ruins in Toyooka, Japan

- 有子山城
- Toyooka, Hyōgo, Japan
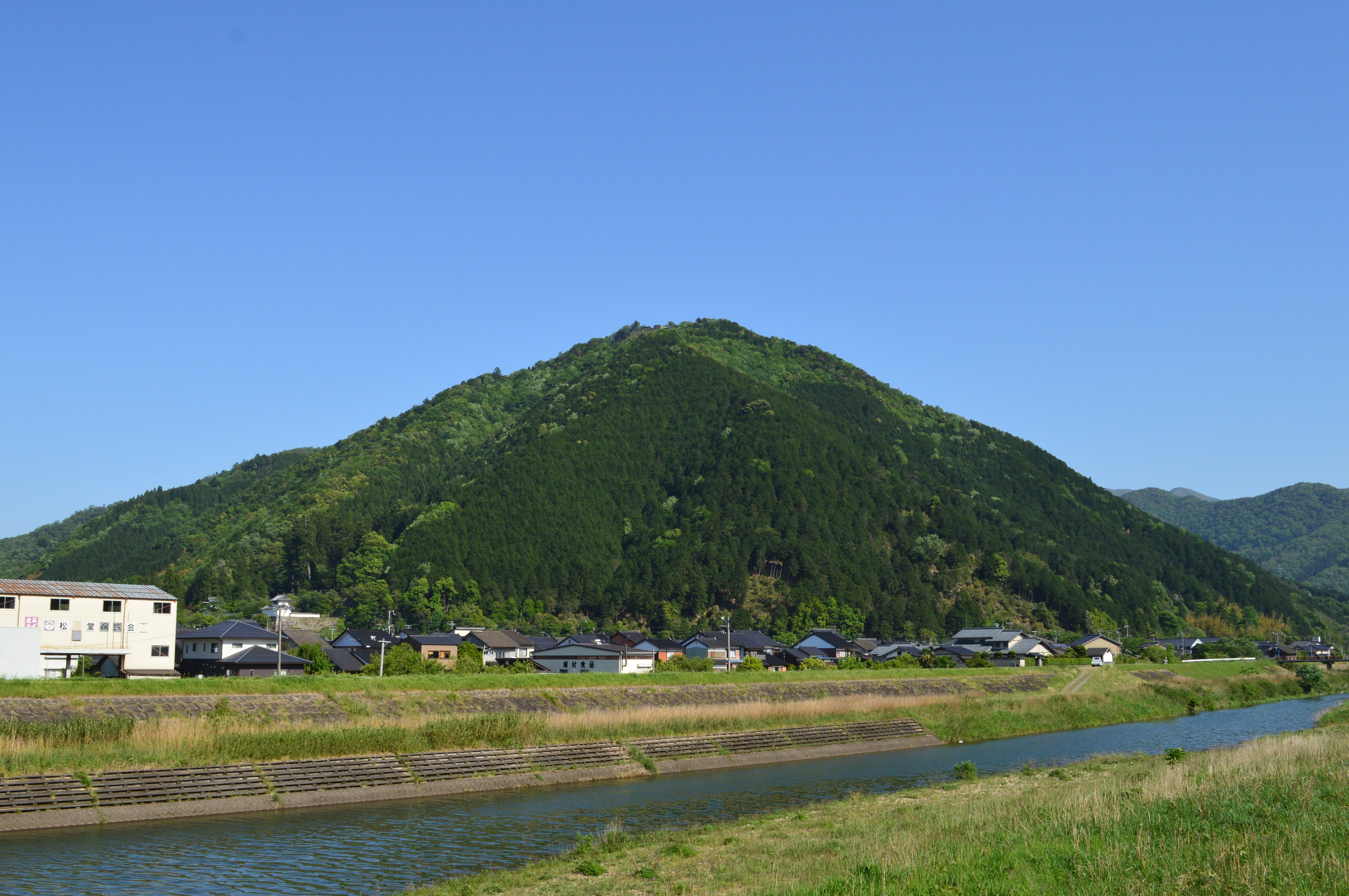
- Arikoyama Castle

Site information
- Type: Mountaintop-style castle
- Owner: Yamana clan
- Condition: ruins

Location
- Arikoyama Castle Arikoyama Castle (Japan)
- Coordinates: 35°27′19.61″N 134°52′41.23″E

Site history
- Built: 1574
- Built by: Yamana Suketoyo
- Materials: Stone walls
- Demolished: 1604

Garrison information
- Past commanders: Yamana Suketoyo, Maeno Nagayasu
- National Historic Site of Japan

Arikoyama Castle (有子山城, Arikoyama-jō) was a Sengoku period Japanese castle located in the Izushi neighborhood of the city of Toyooka, Hyōgo Prefecture, Japan. Its ruins, along with the ruins of nearby Konosumiyama Castle have been protected as a National Historic Site since 1934 under the designation "Yamana clan castle ruins"

== History ==
Arikoyama Castle and neighboring Izushi Castle are located on 320-meter Mount Shiroyama, at the southern edge of Izushi basin, southeast of Toyooka city center. This area was the center of ancient Tajima Province, and the site is a strategic location controlling the main route to Tanba Province and Tango Province. The area came under the control of the Yamana clan, a cadet branch of the Nitta clan, in the Muromachi period. The Yamana clan had close relations with the Ashikaga shogunate and was one of four clans with hereditary rights to the position of Samurai-dokoro. The Yamana leveraged their position to eventually claim the position of shugo over 11 of the 66 provinces of Japan. However, the Ashikaga grew fearful of the expanding power of the clan, and Shogun Ashikaga Yoshimitsu encouraged internal conflicts within the clan and sponsored the Hosokawa clan in its position of kanrei of offset the Yamana. By the middle of the 15th century, the power the Ashikaga shogunate began to decline, and a succession dispute within the shogunate led to the Ōnin War from 1467 to 1477. Konosumiyama Castle had been constructed in the 15th century as the main base of the clan by Yamana Sozen (1404-1473), but the Ōnin War had left the clan weakened and rising local warlords such as the Akamatsu clan, Mōri clan and Amago clan had seized much of their territories, and even within their strongholds Tajima itself, the Yamana were mostly nominal overlords as local retainers gained much independence. Under these circumstances, the clan was defeated in 1576 by Toyotomi Hideyoshi.

Yamana Suketoyo managed to escape to Sakai and was pardoned by Nobunaga in 1570, and allowed to return to his ancestral territory in Tajima. He decided not to reoccupy Konosumiyama Castle, but moved a short distance away and constructed Arikoyama Castle at a high elevation. Although he served Nobunaga loyally, in 1580 when Toyotomi Hideyoshi was fighting the Mōri clan, one of Yamana Sukekiyo's powerful retainers, the Otagaki clan, defected to the enemy. Hideyoshi charged the Yamana with treason, and attacked Arikoyama Castle, ending the power of the clan. Hideyoshi assigned the castle to his younger brother, Toyotomi Hidenaga.Hidenaga rebuilt the castle with the assistance of Tōdō Takatora to incorporated modern innovations, such as stone walls and a huge dry moat with a width of 30 meters. In 1585, Hidenaga was transferred to Yamato Province and the castle was assigned to Maeno Nagayasu, one of Hideyoshi's oldest retainers. However, when Hideyoshi decided to purge Hidenaga in 1595, Maeno was caught up in the purge and killed. The castle was reassigned to the Koide clan, who later became daimyō of Izushi Domain under the Tokugawa shogunate.

In 1585 Hidenaga became the lord of Yamato province (Nara prefecture) and Kii province (Wakayama prefecture) and moved to Koriyama castle, then Nagayasu Maeno (1528-1595), one of the oldest retainer of Hideyoshi was appointed as a lord. But Nagayasu was involved in the purge of Hidetsugu Toyotomi (1568-1595) and forced to die, then Koide clan became the lord of the castle. The Koide built the more conveniently located Izushi Castle in 1604, and Arikoyama Castle was abandoned by 1615.

== Current ==
The castle is now only ruins, with some stone walls and moats. The main areas of the castle are spread over a ridge to the west of the summit of the hill. In 2017, the castle was listed as one of the Continued 100 Fine Castles of Japan.

== Gallery ==
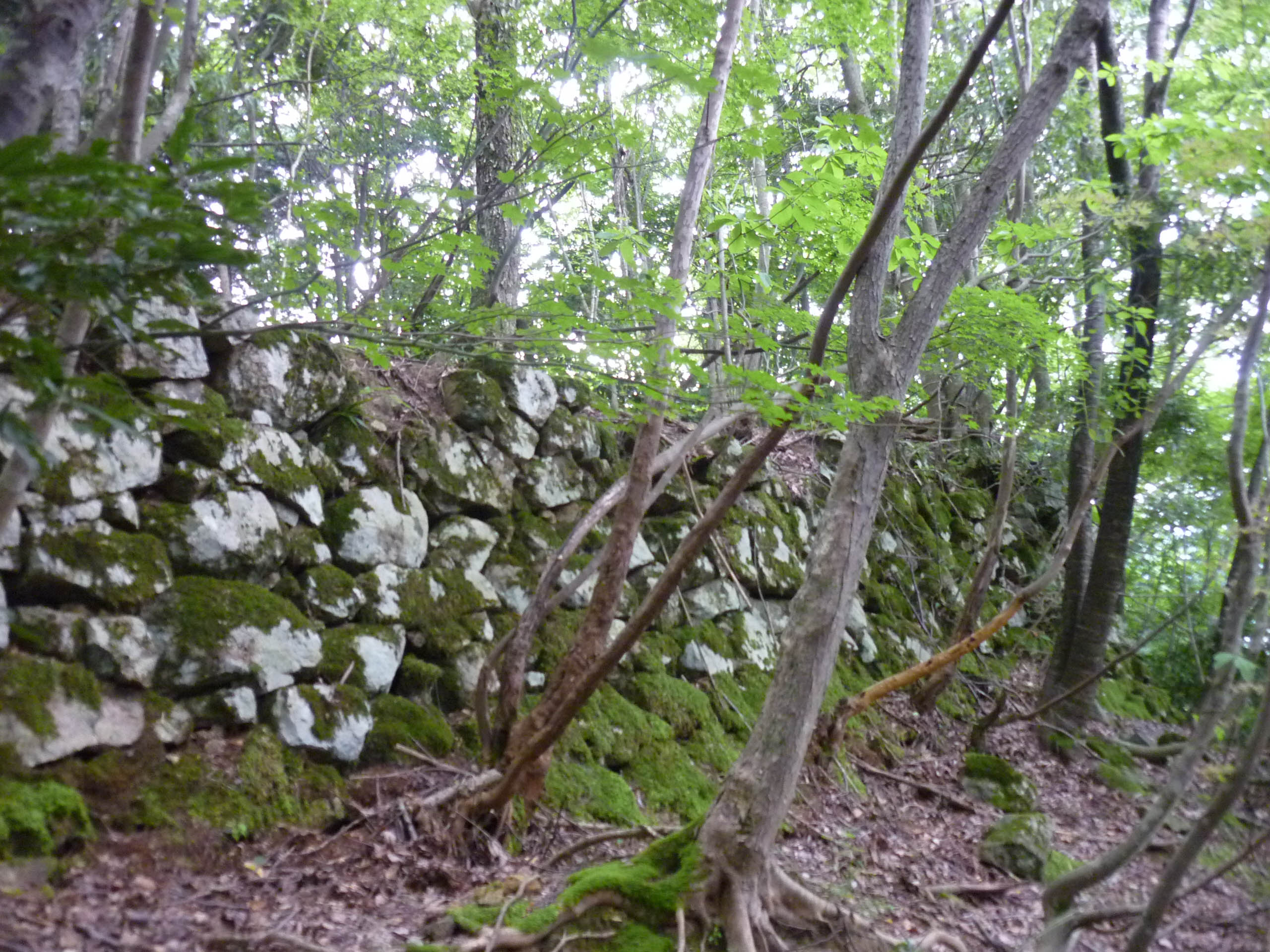
Stone wall of the castle

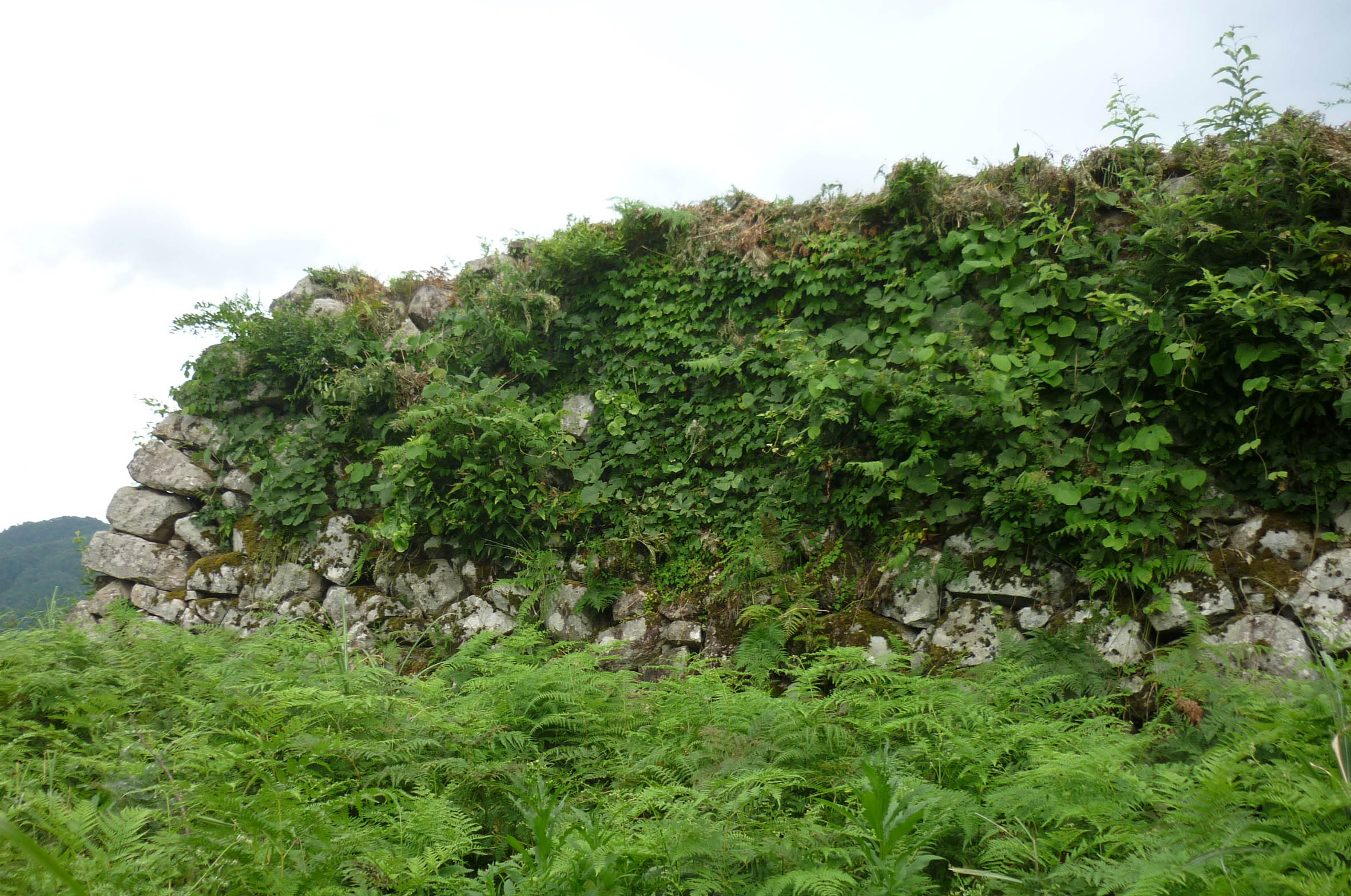
Stone wall of the Honamaru compound

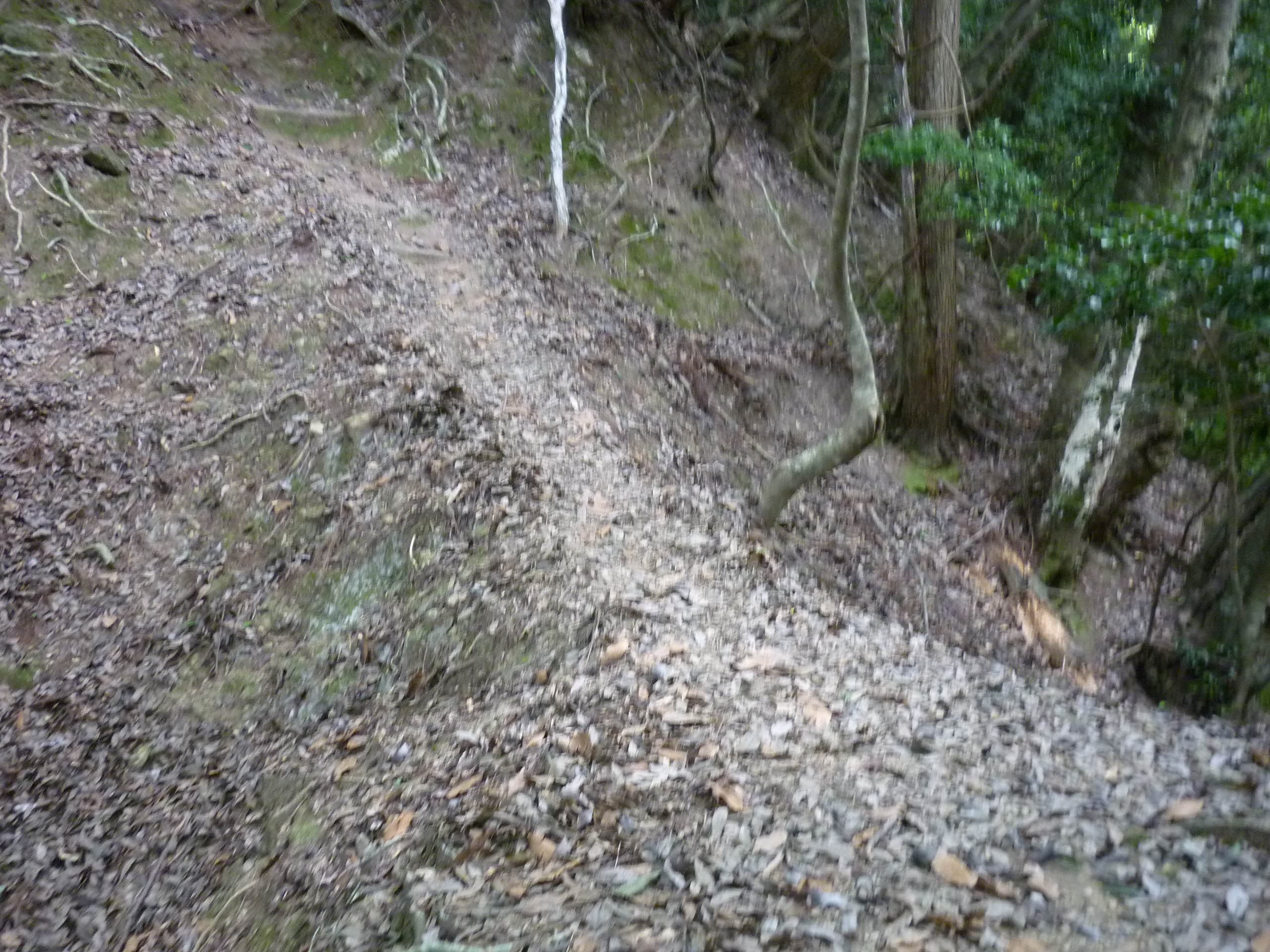
Eathen bridge of the castle

== Literature ==
- De Lange, William (2021). An Encyclopedia of Japanese Castles. Groningen: Toyo Press. pp. 600 pages. ISBN 978-9492722300.
