= Awaga Shrine =

Shinto shrine in Hyōgo Prefecture, Japan

Awaga Jinja 粟鹿神社
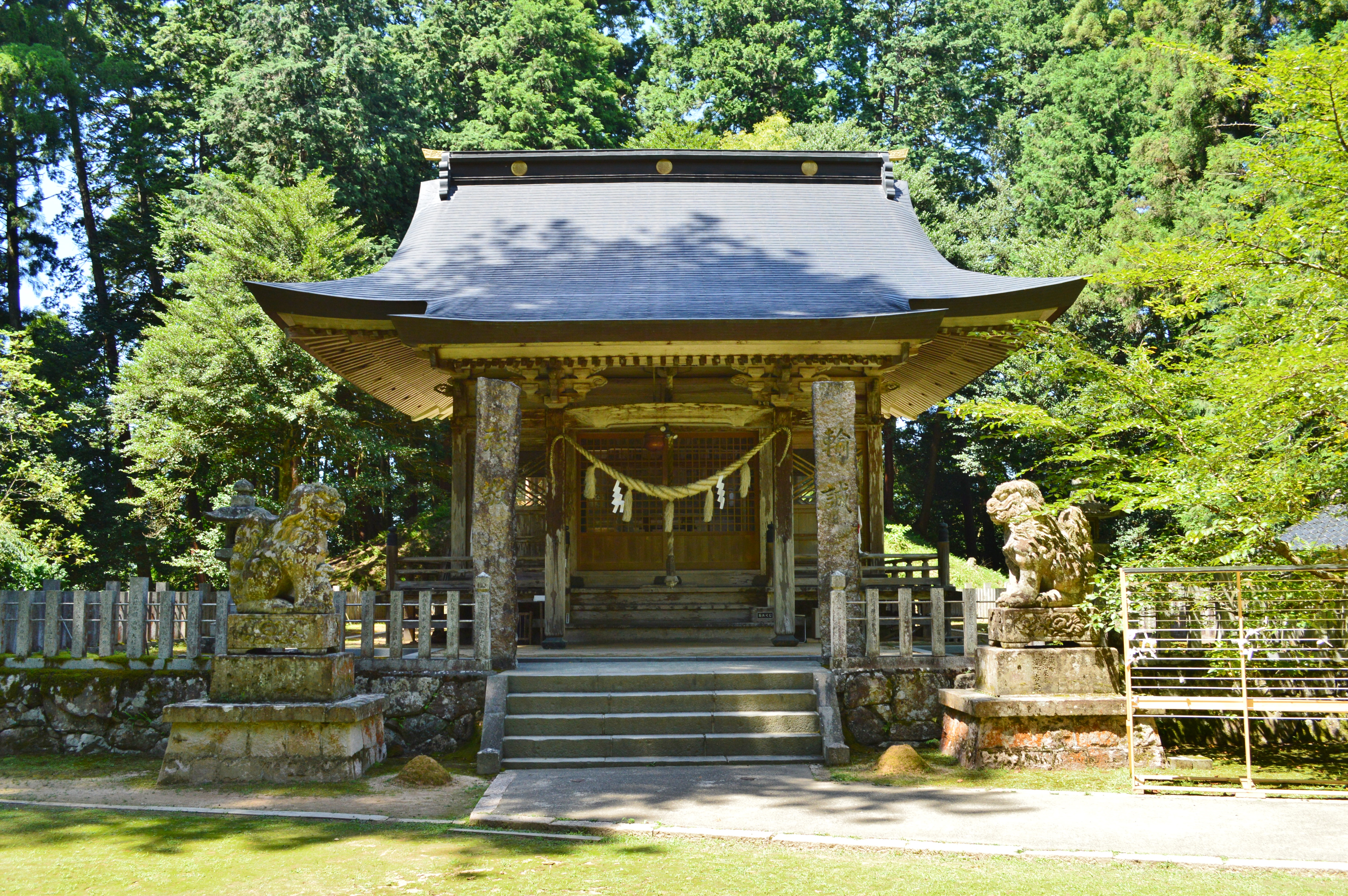
- Haiden of Awaga Jinja

- Location within Hyōgo Prefecture Location within Japan

Religion
- Affiliation: Shinto
- Deity: Amenomisari
- Festival: October 17

Location
- Location: 2152 Awaga, Santocho, Asago-shi, Hyōgo-ken
- Interactive map of Awaga Jinja 粟鹿神社
- Coordinates: 35°18′2.90″N 134°54′17.35″E

Architecture
- Style: Nagare-zukuri
- Established: unknown

Awaga Jinja (粟鹿神社) is a Shinto shrine in the Santocho Awaga neighborhood of the city of Asago in Hyōgo Prefecture, Japan. It is one of the two shrines (along with Izushi Jinja) which claim the title of ichinomiya of former Tajima Province. The main festival of the shrine is held annually on October 17.

== Enshrined kami ==
The main kami enshrined at Awaga Jinja are:

- Amenomisari (天美佐利命)
- Hiko imasu no Ōkimi (日子坐王命), the third prince of the 9th Emperor Kaika and the great-grandfather of the 12th Emperor Keiko.
- Hoori (日子穂穂手見尊), third son of Ninigi and Konohanasakuya-hime; grandfather of Emperor Jimmu.

== History ==
The origins of Awaga Jinja are unknown. According to the shrine's legend, it was founded during the reign of the legendary Emperor Suinin. A local noble, Ohiko Hayami offered to the Imperial Court to build a shrine to worship the Amenomisari, as this kami was an arashin (rough deity) which needed placating. His great-grandson took the surname "Kambe" and was the kuni no miyatsuko of Tajima. The shrine first appears in the historical documents in tax records for Tajima Province dated 737. It appears thereafter in the various historical chronicles in the Heian period, including the Engishiki and the Wamyō Ruijushō. The Engishiki lists it as a Myōjin Taisha (名神大社). During the Sengoku period, Toyotomi Hideyoshi occupied the area in 1580, he confiscated the territory of the shrine, which fell into decline. Under then Edo Period Tokugawa shogunate, the area became Izushi Domain, ruled by the Koide clan followed by the Sengoku clan.

During the Meiji period era of State Shinto, the shrine was rated as a village shrine in 1872 and promoted to a prefectural shrine in 1879 under the Modern system of ranked Shinto Shrines.

The Honden was built in 1880 in the Nagare-zukuri style and is a three by two bay building. The Haiden is a four by three bay building. There is a small hill behind the main shrine which has what appears to be the remnants of a moat. The shrine refers to this as the "tomb of the god", but it is not certain if this is an ancient kofun or not, as it has never been excavation. However, from 1999 to 2004, an archaeological excavation was conducted in the vicinity of the precincts due to the construction of the Kitakinki Toyooka Expressway, and the foundations of structures and a medieval stone paved approach have been found, indicating that the shrine was once much larger than it is at present.

The shrine is located about 30-minutes on foot from Yanase Station on the JR West Sanin Main Line.

== Gallery ==
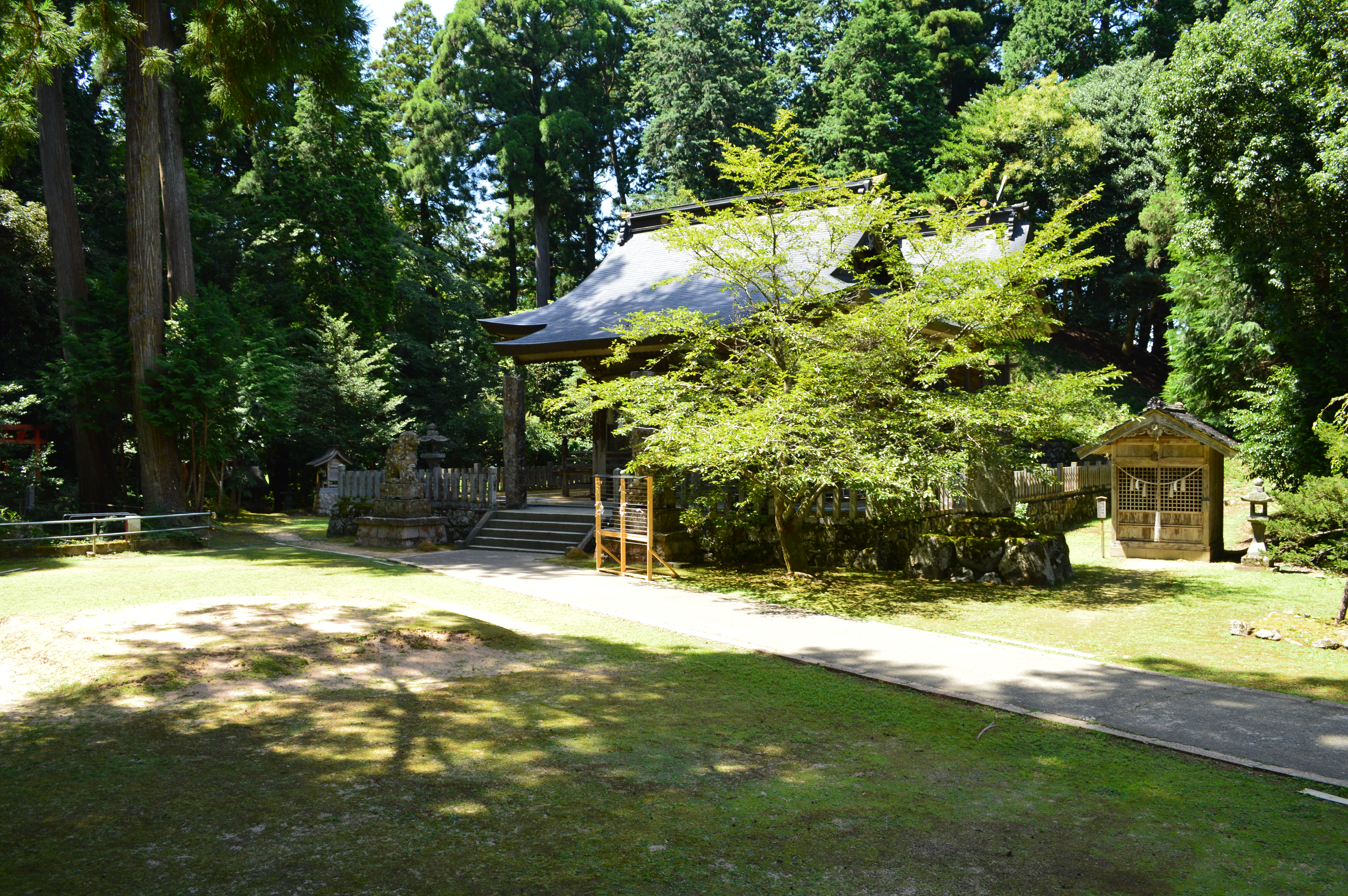
precincts

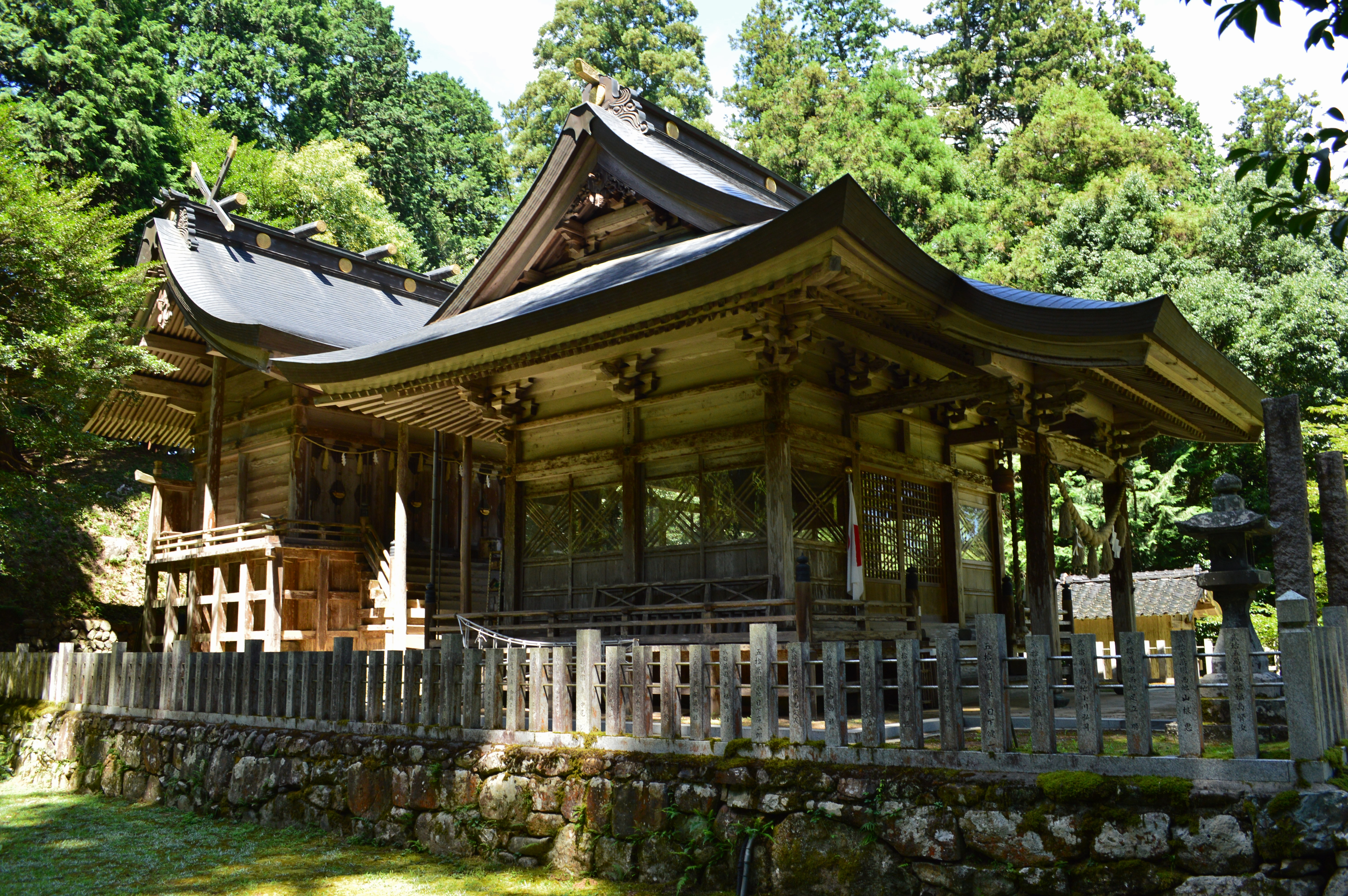
Shaden

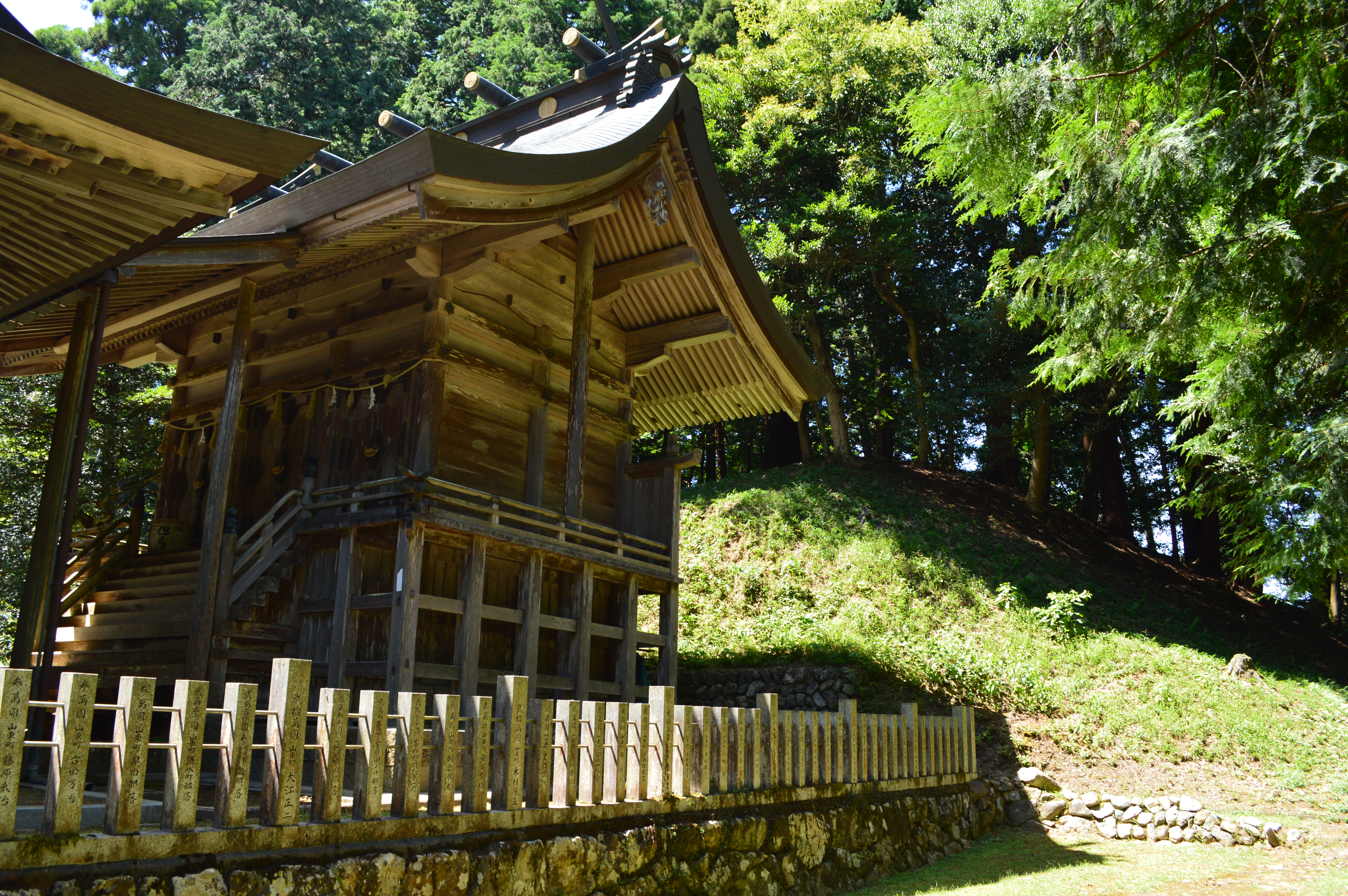
Honden

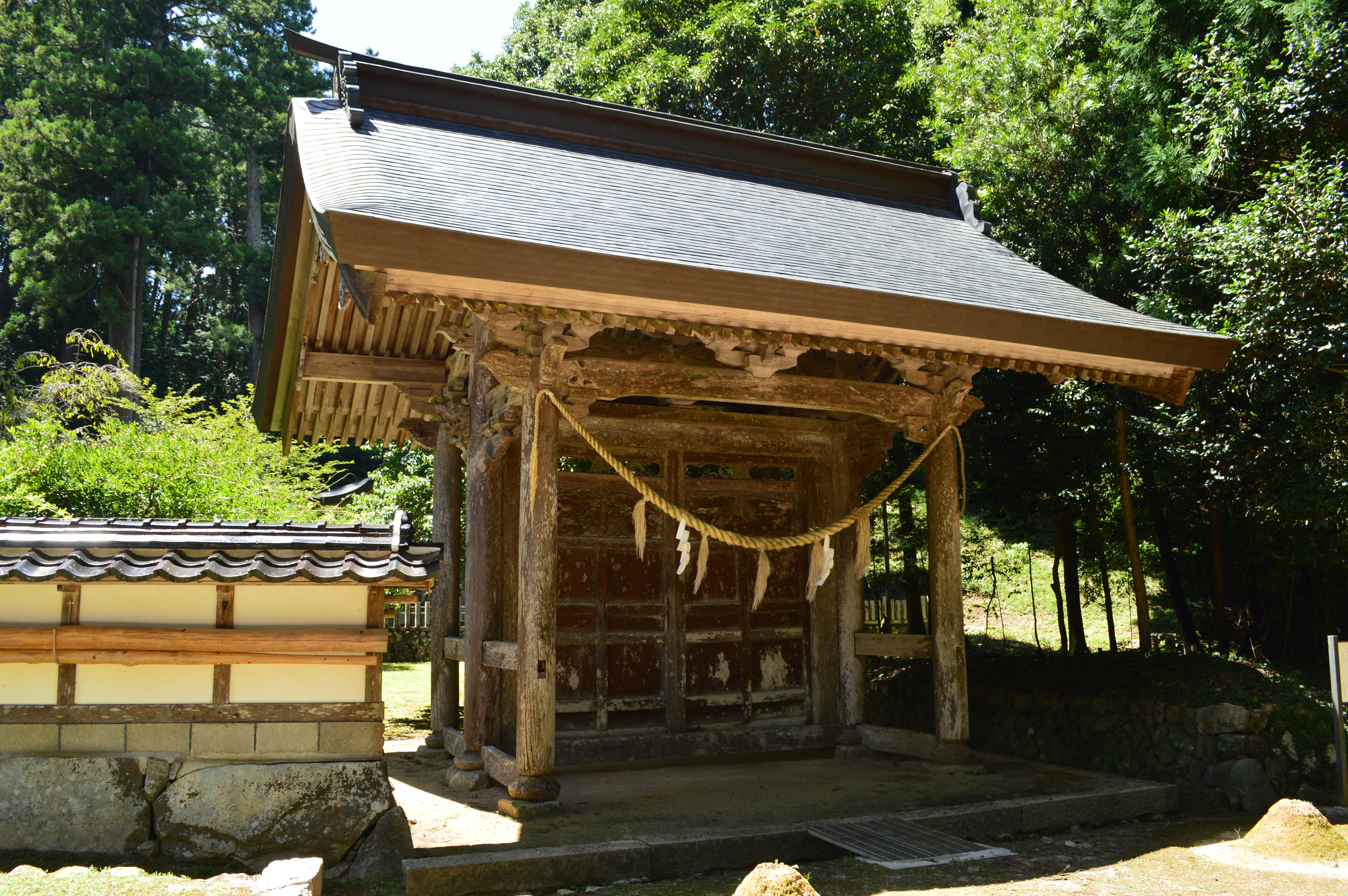
Chokushimon (Asago City ICP)

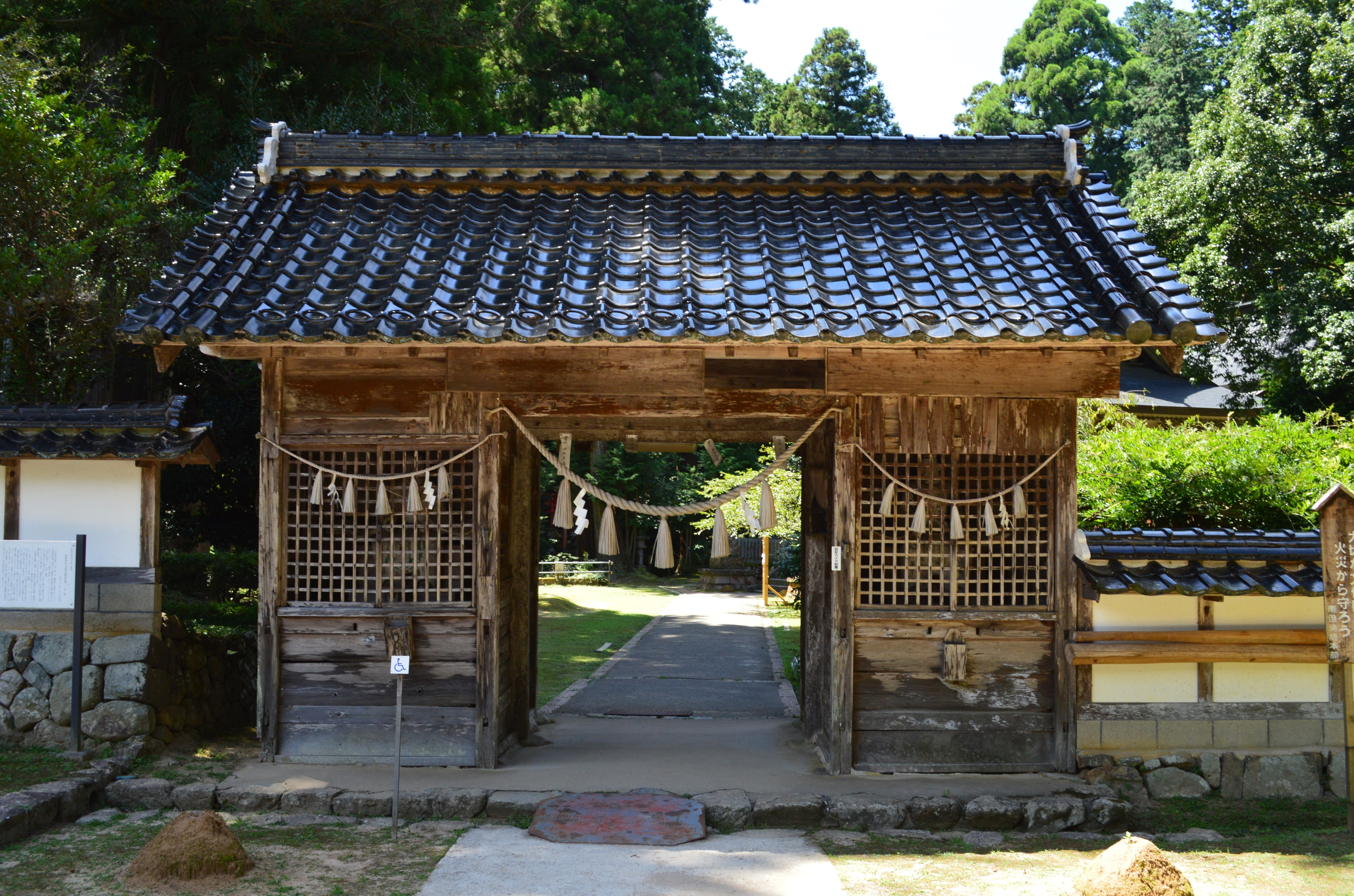
Shinmon

== See also ==
- List of Shinto shrines
- Ichinomiya
