= Konosumiyama Castle =

Japanese Muromachi-period castle

- 此隅山城
- Toyooka, Hyōgo, Japan
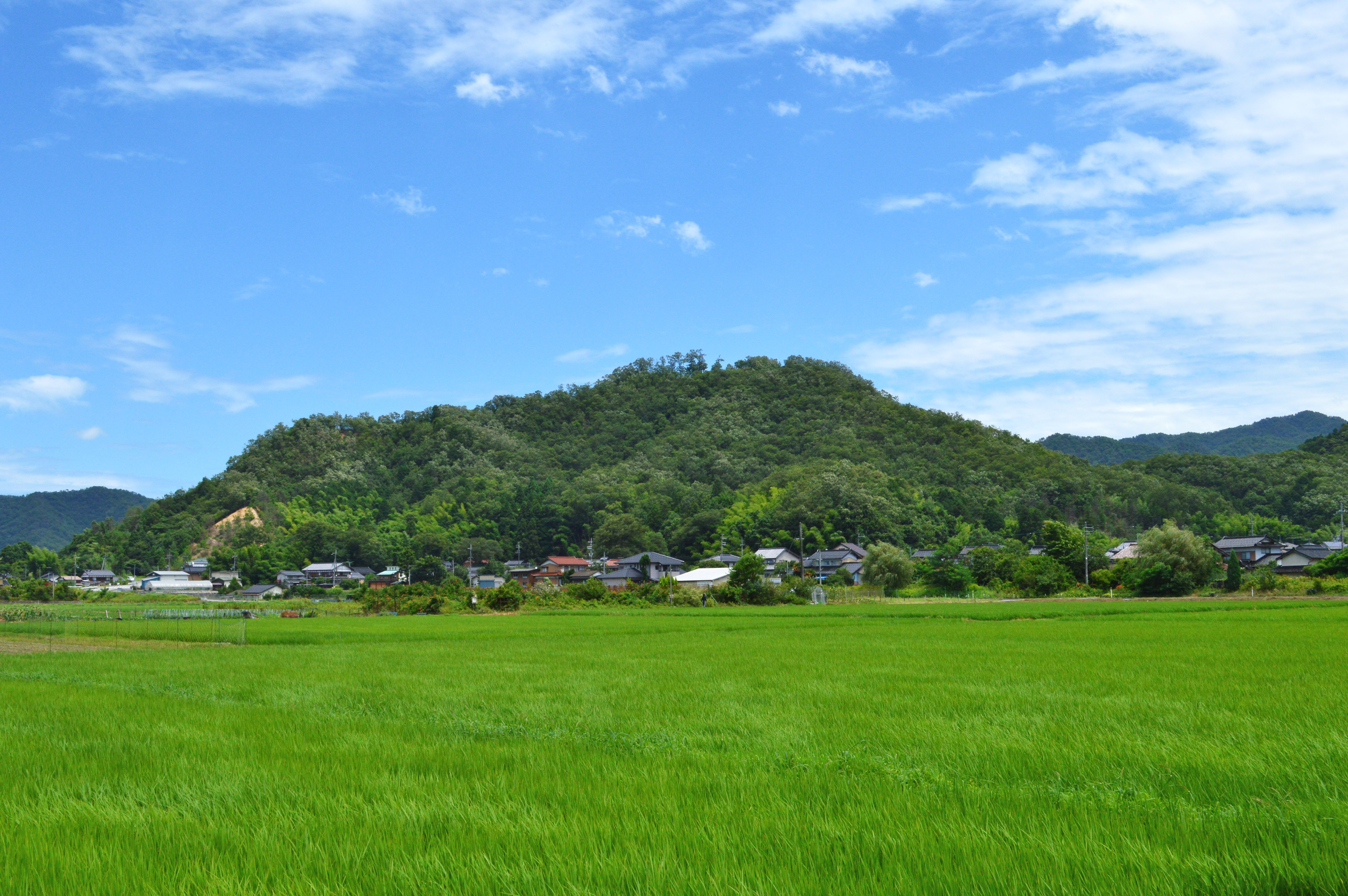
- Site of Konosumiyama castle

Site information
- Type: Yamajiro-style Japanese castle
- Condition: ruins

Location
- Konosumiyama Castle Konosumiyama Castle (Japan)
- Coordinates: 35°29′15.8″N 134°52′22.1″E

Site history
- Built: 15th century
- Built by: Yamana Sozen
- National Historic Site of Japan

Konosumiyama Castle (此隅山城, Konosumiyama-jō) was a Muromachi to Sengoku period Japanese castle located in the Izushi neighborhood of the city of Toyooka, Hyōgo Prefecture, Japan. Its ruins, along with the ruins of nearby Arikoyama Castle have been protected as a National Historic Site since 1934 under the designation "Yamana clan castle ruins".

== History ==
Konosumiyama Castle is located approximately two kilometers north of the center of former Izushi city and three kilometers from the southeast edge of the Toyooka basin in northern Hyogo. The location controlled the ancient San'in highway connecting the Kinai region of Japan with the San'in region and was near the political and economic center of Tajima Province. The area came under the control of the Yamana clan, a cadet branch of the Nitta clan in the Muromachi period. The Yamana clan had close relations with the Ashikaga shogunate and was one of four clans with hereditary rights to the position of Samurai-dokoro. The Yamana leveraged their position to eventually claim the position of shugo over 11 of the 66 provinces of Japan. However, the Ashikaga grew fearful of the expanding power of the clan, and Shogun Ashikaga Yoshimitsu encouraged internal conflicts within the clan and sponsored the Hosokawa clan in its position of kanrei of offset the Yamana. By the middle of the 15th century, the power the Ashikaga shogunate began to decline, and a succession dispute within the shogunate led to the Ōnin War from 1467 to 1477.

Konosumiyama Castle was constructed in the 15th century as the main base of the clan by Yamana Sozen (1404–1473). The Yamana clan led the western forces in the war, and his rival, Hatakeyama Katsumoto led the eastern army. After years of inconclusive fighting, Kyoto lay in ruins, the rival candidates for the position of Shogun had died, and both Yamana Sōzen and Hatakeyama Katsumoto had died of illness; yet having inflamed ancient rivalries, the war continued into the provinces. The Yamana clan, which had been at the height of its power at the start of the war, was so weakened that it could not suppress local revolts, and by the year 1500 had been reduced only to Inaba and Tajima Provinces. Even in these areas, the Yamana were mostly nominal overlords, and powerful local retainers had emerged as petty warlords. Yamana Suketoyo (1511-1580) was briefly able to bring the retainers back into line. In 1569, Hashiba Hideyoshi, acting under Oda Nobunaga invaded Tajima. Yamana Suketoyo could not defend Konosumiyama Castle, but managed to escape to Sakai. He was later pardoned by Nobunaga in 1570, and allowed to return to his ancestral territory in Tajima, but he decided not to reoccupy Konosumiyama Castle, but moved a short distance away and constructed Arikoyama Castle. Konosumiyama Castle was allowed to fall into ruin soon afterwards.

== Structure ==
As was typical of Japanese castles of the time, Konosumiyama Castle consisted of many small enclosures spread over three ridges on the peak of the mountain. The central bailey is small and rectangular, with several small terraces to the south, built along with the ridge like steps, and a line of terraces diverging west to the large entrance area and hillside residence of the Yamana clan. Another line of enclosures spreads northwest from central area and are securely protected by a combination of dry moats and clay walls. These are comparatively larger than the other enclosures, and may have been added in the Sengoku period in the final phase of the castle. Another line of enclosures to northeast is covered with overgrowth. The residence itself is an enclosure, 300 by 200 meters between two ridges on the western slope.

The caste site is a 30-minute drive from the Kitakinki-Toyooka Expressway Hidaka-Kannabe interchange. There is a small museum at the site.

== See also ==
- List of Historic Sites of Japan (Hyōgo)
