= Izushi Shrine =

Shinto shrine in Hyōgo Prefecture, Japan

Izushi Jinja 出石神社
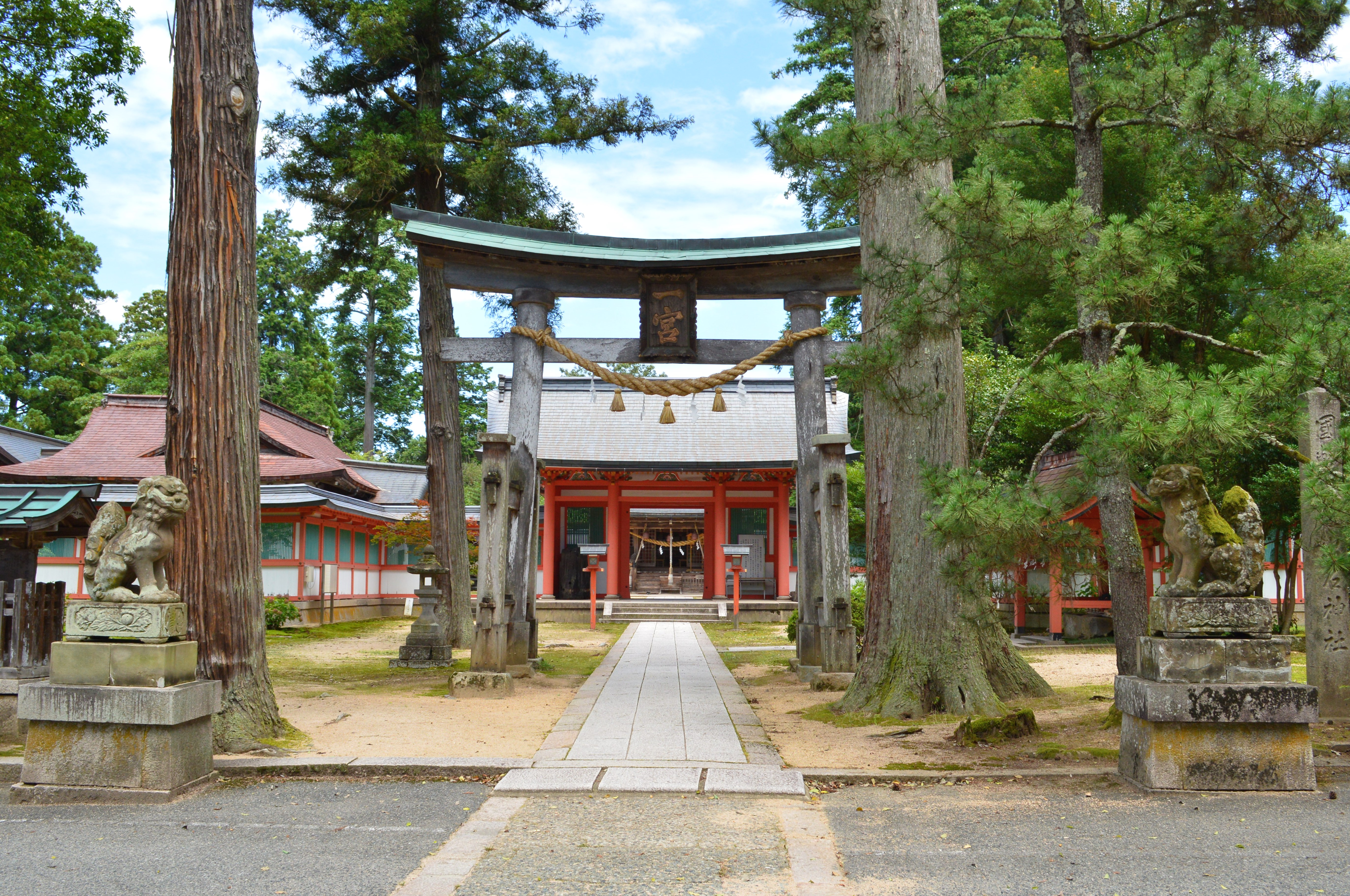
- Entry of Izushi Jinja

- Location within Hyōgo Prefecture Location within Japan

Religion
- Affiliation: Shinto
- Deity: Izushiyamae-Ōkami, Amenohiboko
- Festival: October 20

Location
- Location: 99 Miyauchi, Izushicho, Toyooka-shi, Hyōgo-ken
- Interactive map of Izushi Jinja 出石神社
- Coordinates: 35°28′55″N 134°52′13.03″E

Architecture
- Established: unknown

Izushi Jinja (出石神社) is a Shinto shrine in the Izushi neighborhood of the city of Toyooka in Hyōgo Prefecture, Japan. It is the ichinomiya of former Tajima Province. The main festival of the shrine is held annually on October 20.

== Enshrined kami ==
The kami enshrined at Izushi Jinja are:

- Izushiyamae-Ōkami (伊豆志八前大神)
- Amenohiboko (天日槍命)

== History ==
The Izushi Shrine is located at the foot of a mountain on the eastern edge of the Izushi basin in the northern part of Hyōgo prefecture. It is located about 2 kilometers north of the current Izushi city area.The Ishrine is the center of the legend of Prince Amenohiboko of Silla, which is recorded in the "Kojiki" and "Nihon Shoki", who settled in this area during the reign of Emperor Suinin. He brought with him eight sacred treasures from Silla, including a sacred spear, and married a daughter of the kuni no miyatsuko of Tajima.

The origins of Izushi Jinja are unknown. Although there is no documentary evidence, it is believed that it began as the family shrine of the descendants of the legendary prince Amenohiboko; however, there is some confusion as to whether the object of worship is the spirit of the prince, or the spirits of the magical objects brought from Silla. The shrine first appears in the historical documents in tax records for Tajima Province dated 737. It appears after that in the various historical chronicles in the Heian period, including the Engishiki and the Wamyō Ruijushō and the Nihon Kiryaku.

The Engishiki lists it as a Myōjin Taisha (名神大社) which holds eight kami, and as the ichinomiya of the province. During the Muromachi period, the main castle of the powerful Yamana clan was located to the north of this shrine. The shrine prospered from this proximity until 1504, when it was burned down during an internal conflict within the Yamana clan. It was rebuilt by 1525; however, when Toyotomi Hideyoshi occupied the area in 1580, he confiscated the territory of the Yamana clan, and the shrine fell into decline. Under the Edo Period Tokugawa shogunate, the area became Izushi Domain, ruled by the Koide clan followed by the Sengoku clan.

During the Meiji period era of State Shinto, the shrine was designated as a National shrine, 2nd rank (国幣中社, kokuhei-chūsha) under the Modern system of ranked Shinto Shrines However, the shrine burned down in 1910. The current buildings date from the 1914 reconstruction and are a Tangible Cultural Property of Toyooka city. The precincts are still huge, with an area of 22,000 square meters, of which a 1000 square meter area in the northeastern corner is fenced off with access prohibited.

In Edo period maps, this area is marked "Amenohiboko Mausoleum". In the Torii neighborhood, about 500 meters west of the precincts, the remnants of an old torii gate were excavated along with many old coins in 1933, indicating that the precincts were once much larger. The excavated torii remnants have been designated as a Tangible Cultural Property of Toyooka City

== Gallery ==
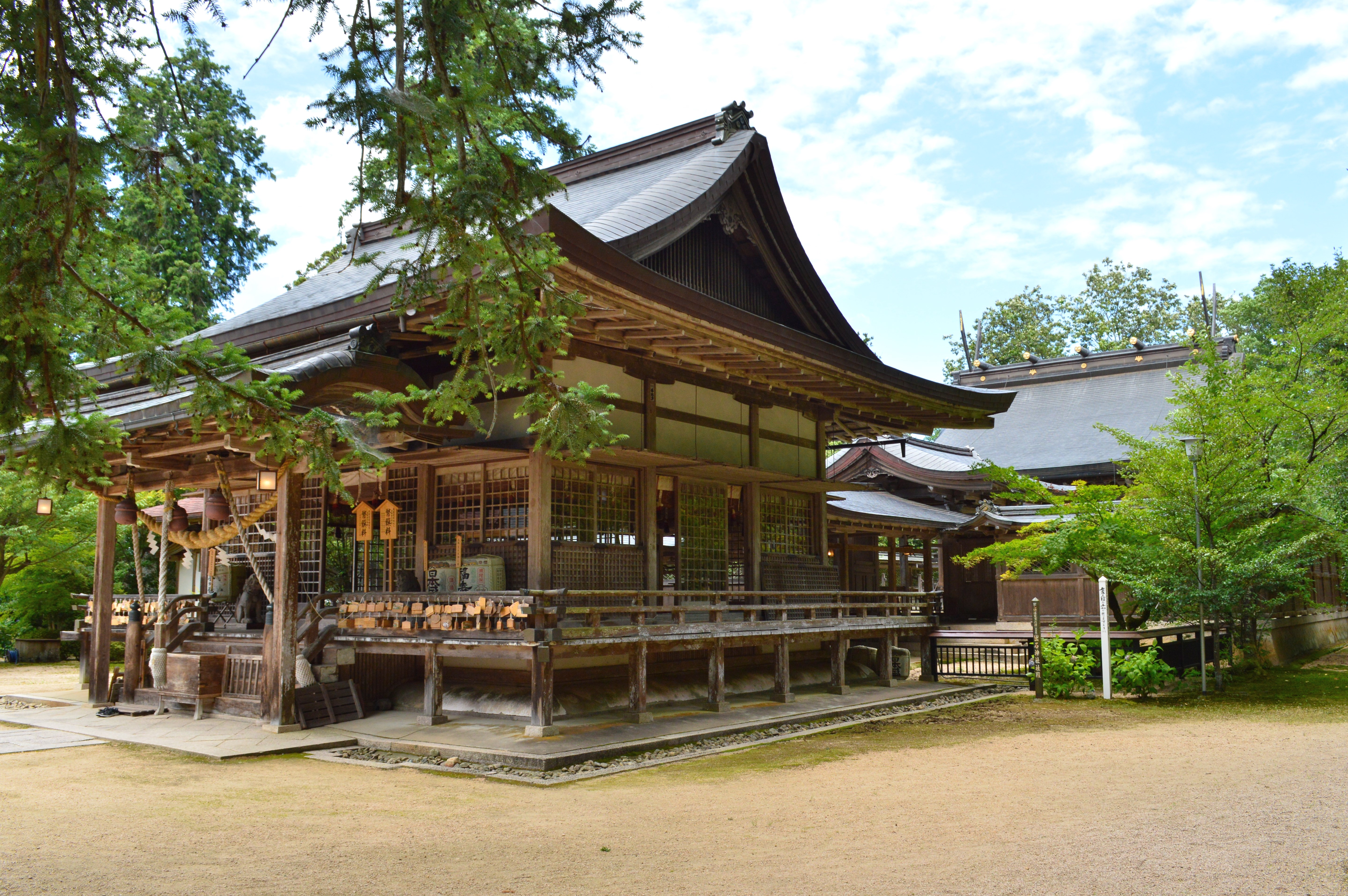
Precincts

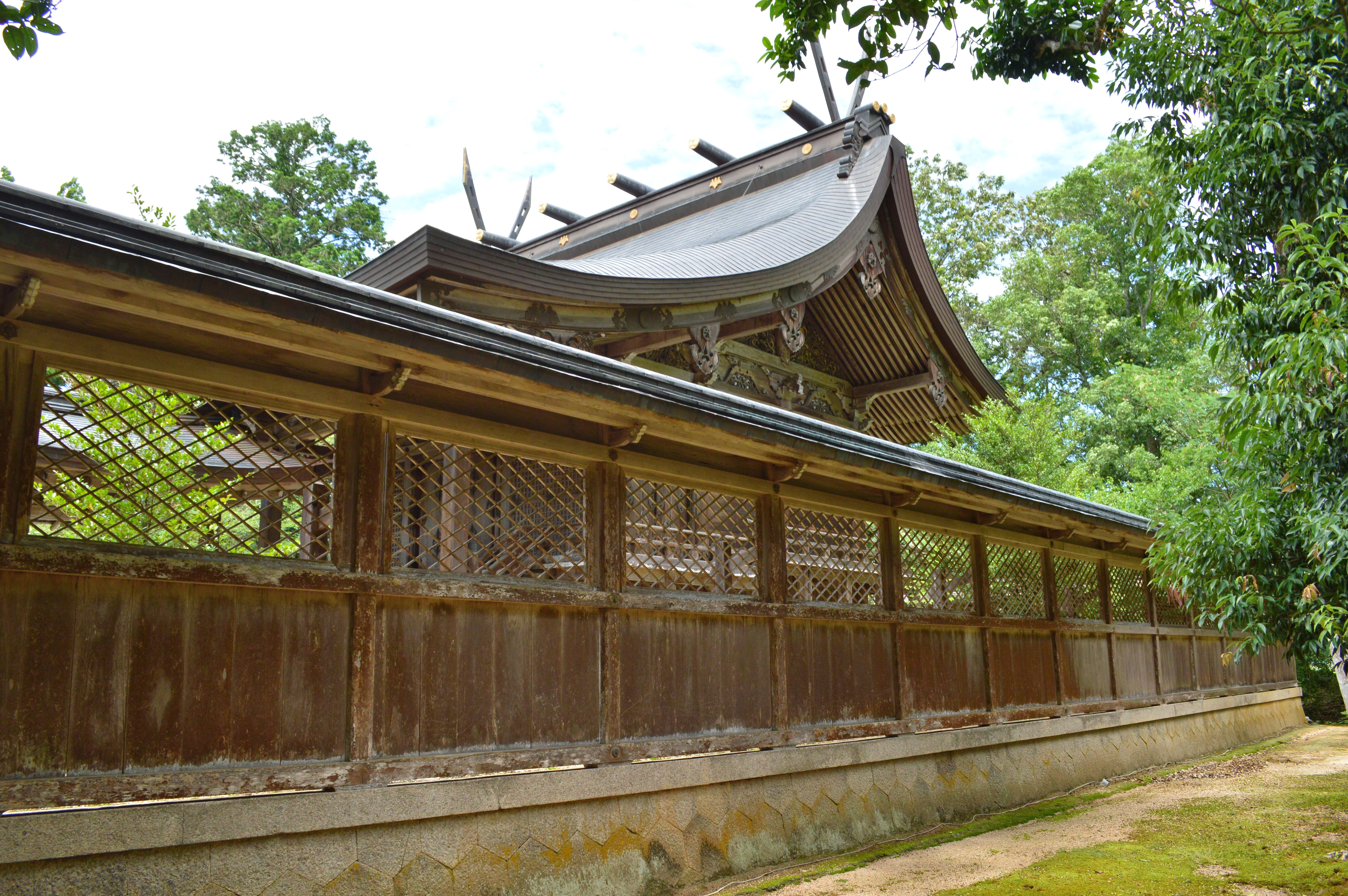
Honden

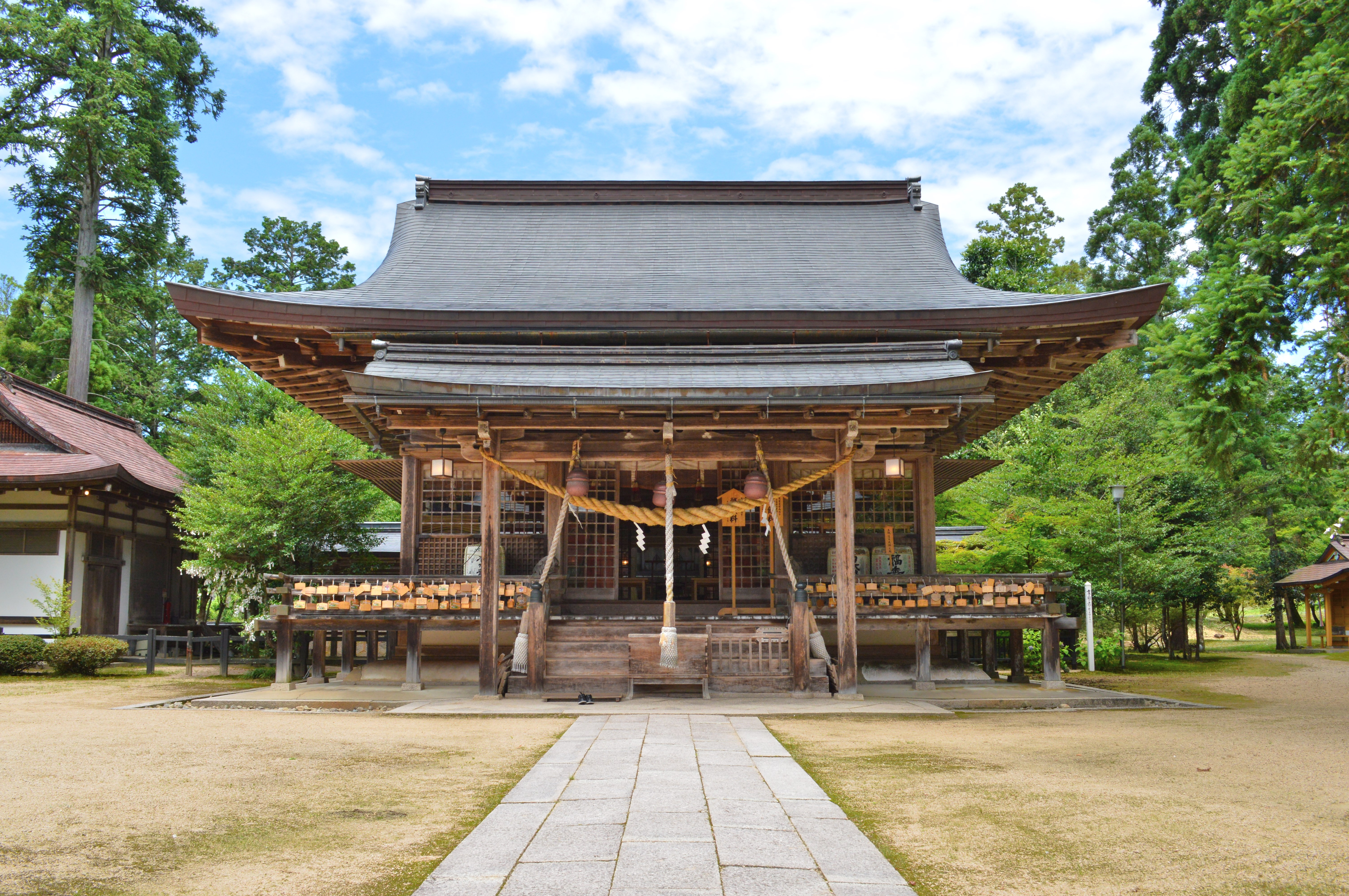
Haiden

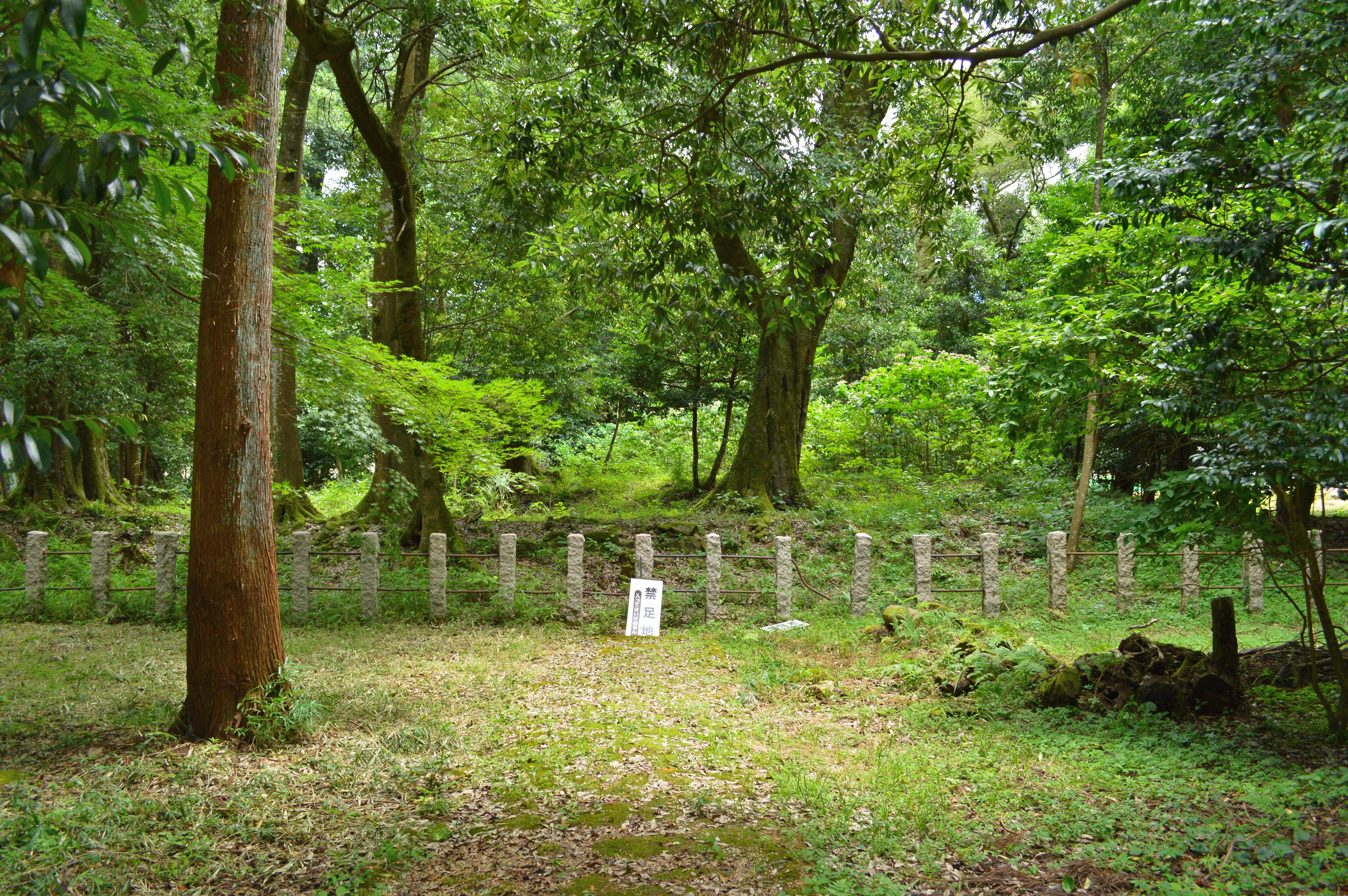
"Forbidden area"

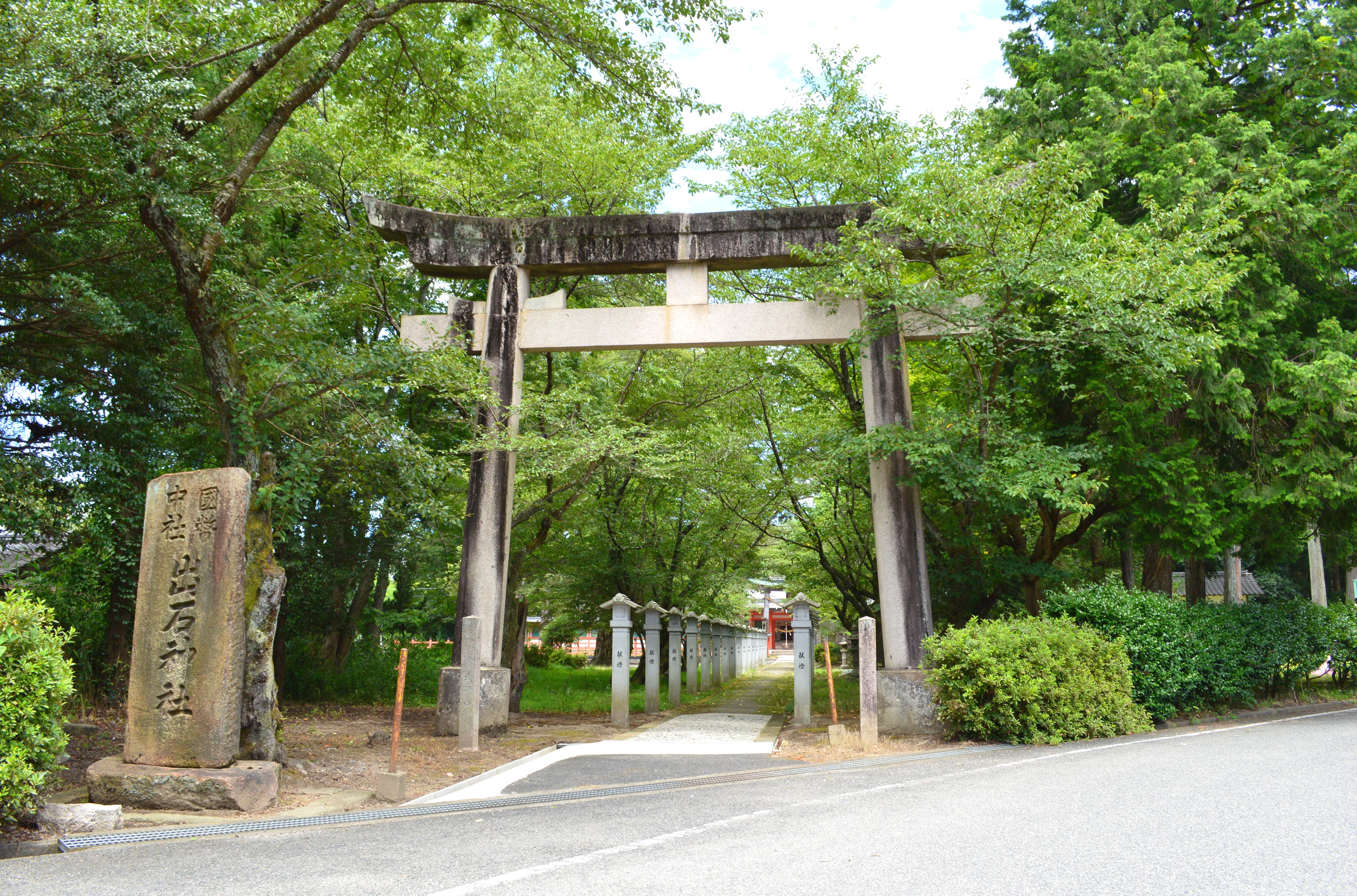
FIrst Torii

== Cultural Properties ==
=== National Important Cultural Properties ===
- Wakizashi short sword, Nanboku-chō period, 39.2 centimeters, inscribed "Tanshū Kunimitsu" and with eight Siddhaṃ script letters.

== See also ==
- List of Shinto shrines
- Ichinomiya
