= Amenohiboko =

Legendary prince of Silla

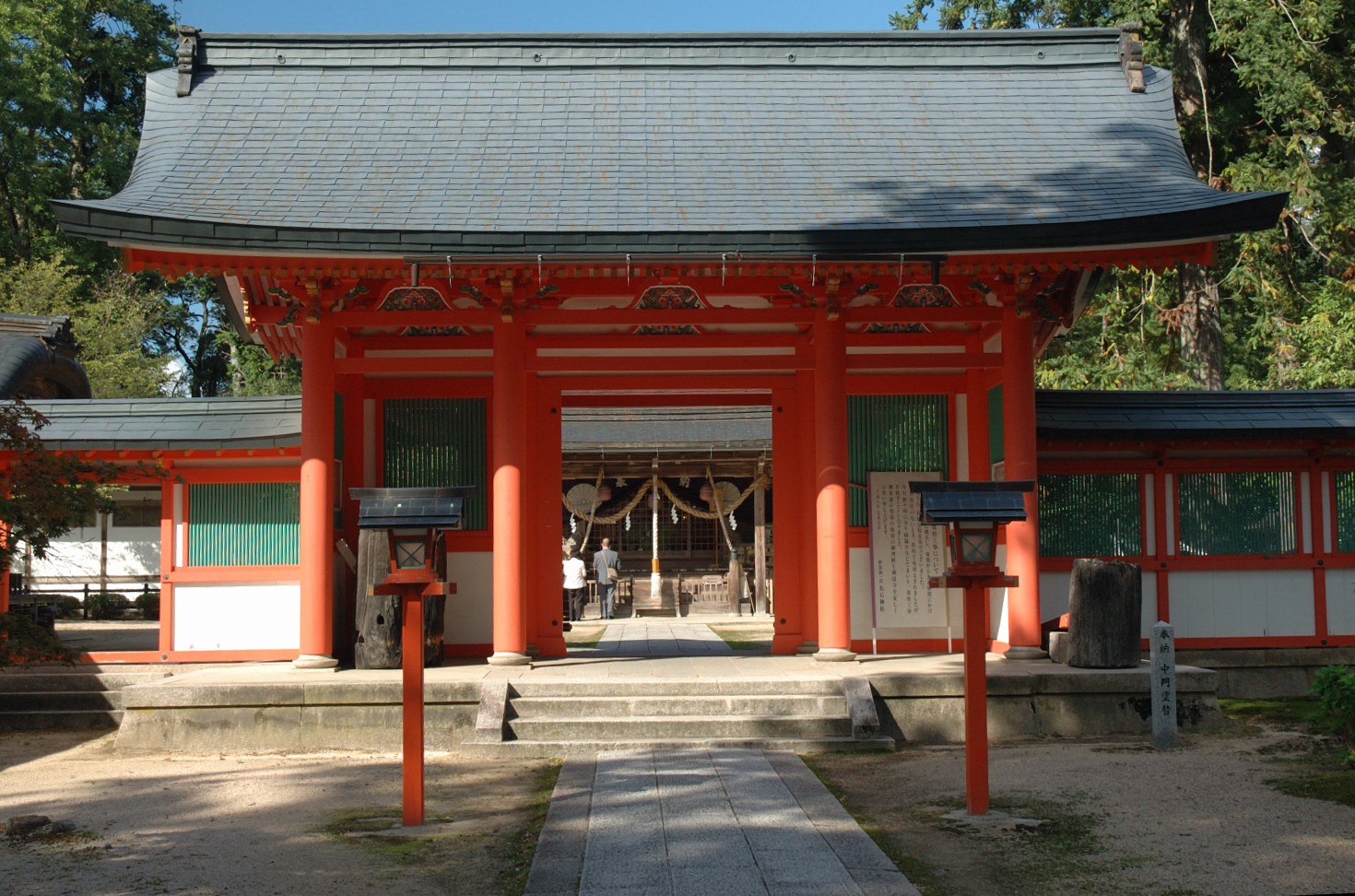
Izushi Shrine, Hyōgo Prefecture

Amenohiboko (天日槍; アメノヒボコ) was a legendary prince of Silla who settled in Japan during the era of Emperor Suinin, around the 3rd or 4th century. Amenohiboko is said to have lived in Tajima Province; the Tajima clan (多遅摩氏) and the Miyake clan have claimed to be his descendants. He is the ancestral god of Tajima Province and is supposedly enshrined in the Shinto Shrine (Izushi jinja) at Toyooka in Hyōgo Prefecture. Seven or eight treasures brought by Amenohiboko from Silla are thought to be housed in Izushi Shrine in Hyōgo Prefecture.

His descendant, Tajimahitaka (多遅摩比多訶)'s daughter, Kazuraki no Takanukahime (葛城高顙媛) became the mother of Empress Jingū; Tajimahitaka's brother, Tajimamori (多遅麻毛理), became the god of sweets.

== History ==
According to the Kojiki, a woman was lying down near a swamp called "Anuguma (阿具奴摩/阿具沼)" in Silla, when sunlight touched her vagina and she gave birth to a red ball on the spot. A passerby witnessed the event and pleaded with her to give the ball to him, and he finally took possession of it. One day, the man was walking with his cow to deliver some provisions, when Amenohiboko (then a Silla prince) saw him and mistakenly thought that he was trying to eat the cow. After being imprisoned, the man begged to be set free, offering the red ball as compensation. After accepting the offer, Amenohiboko brought the red ball home, where it turned into a fully grown woman of great beauty. The prince decided to marry the woman, and the two lived relatively happily—until Amenohiboko lashed out at his new wife over a trivial cause. The woman became upset and stated that she was going to return to her "homeland"; then she got on a small boat and sailed to Naniwa (Japan). Realizing his mistake and seeking forgiveness, Amenohiboko set sail for Naniwa himself, but the guardian kami prevented him from entering the land; he had to stop in Tajima, where he remained. He then found another wife named "Maemitsu (前津見)".

The original wife who had arrived in Naniwa became a deity to its people, and she was called "Akaruhime (阿加流比売)".

According to the Nihon Shoki, "In Kagami Village, Omi Province, there was a craftsman of Sue pottery (Sueki) who served the prince of Silla, Amenohiboko, who came to Japan." However, in modern times, early Sueki was not found at the Kagamiyama ruins of old kilns in Ryuocho, Shiga Prefecture, which is closely linked to this description; similarly, Sueki was not found in Tajima region where Amenohiboko is said to have lived. Amenohiboko is attributed, in legend, to some parts of Toyooka.

=== Interpretation ===
Scholars have compared the story of Akaruhime's birth with the red ball to similar legends that were told in the region—the most similar stories being about Dongmyeong of Goguryeo, Suro of Geumgwan Gaya and Hyeokgeose of Silla all being born from an egg. Scholars point to Dongmyeong's story in particular. In this story, his mother, Lady Yuhwa (daughter of the river god Habaek), was touched by sunlight on her private parts, where she became pregnant with an egg that later hatched into Dongmyeong. Historians claim that such stories in Asian mythology are common from Siberian to northeastern civilizations; similarly, they claim that the story of Amenohiboko and Akaruhime was heavily influenced by Korean legends having the same premise (i.e., both individuals originating from Silla).

Another theory points to the similarities between Amenohiboko and the folk tale of Yeonorang and Seonyeo, two individuals who accidentally went to Japan and became king and queen. This theory revolves around the involvement of people from Silla unintentionally migrating to Japan, with significant story elements suggesting the importance of the sun. Though the probability of Yeono and Seo becoming king and queen of Japan is quite unlikely, examples of very important immigrants becoming royalty were not unknown; like the story of Yeonorang and Seonyeo, the story of Amenohiboko was deemed similar.

== Legacy ==
Amenohiboko's descendant became the mother of Empress Jingū, a controversial queen who allegedly invaded and conquered the self-declared "promised land"—often interpreted as the Korean Peninsula. The linguist and Japanese-language expert Alexander Vovin makes the following observation: due to Amenohiboko being of Korean origin, Jingū and her son and successor, Emperor Ōjin might have been native speakers of the Korean language.

== See also ==
- Empress Jingū
- Emperor Ōjin
- Yeonorang and Seonyeo
- Ilseong of Silla
