= Maeno =

Maeno (written: 前野) is a Japanese surname. Notable people with the surname include:

- Mitsuyasu Maeno (前野 光保, c. 1947 – 1976), Japanese actor
- Maeno Nagayasu (前野 長康, 1528–1595), Japanese samurai
- Takanori Maeno (前野 貴徳, born 1988), Japanese footballer
- Tomoaki Maeno (前野 智昭, born 1982), Japanese voice actor
