= Izushi Castle =

Hirayamajiro in Hyōgo Prefecture, Japan

Coordinates: 35°27′38″N 134°52′27″E

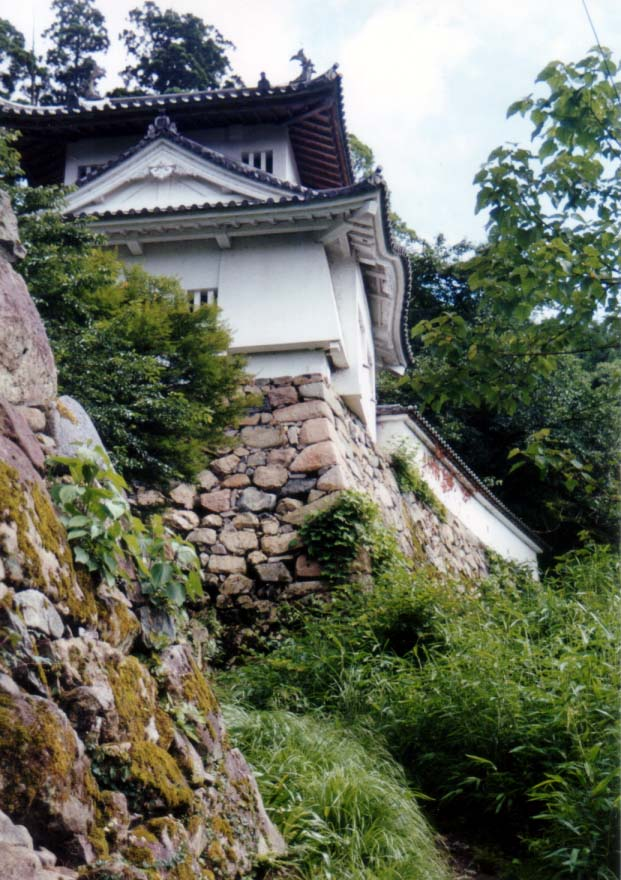
The reconstructed Nishisumiyagura

Izushi Castle (出石城, Izushi-jō) is a hirayamajiro, or castle situated on a hill, located in Izushi, Hyōgo Prefecture, Japan.

== History ==
For more than 200 years the Yamana Family resided at Konosumi Castle. In 1569 the castle fell to attacks by Oda Nobunaga's successor Toyotomi Hideyoshi. After the fall of Konosumi Castle, Yamana Suketoyo built another at Mt. Ariko to the Southeast, but it too fell to Hideyoshi in 1580. In 1604 Koide Yoshihide built Izushi castle at the base of Mt. Ariko.

The Koide ruled over the castle until 1697, when it was transferred to the Matsudaira, who controlled it for only a few years before it was transferred to Sengoku Masaaki. The Sengoku clan ended up ruling over the castle until the Meiji Restoration. In the Edo Period, it was the center of the Izushi Domain.

Izushi Castle is a well known spot in the spring for viewing cherry blossoms. On November 3 they have a castle festival with a mock sankin kotai presentation. While the castle itself is small, it retains elements of the castle town with old samurai homes and shops from the Edo period.

== Today ==
In 1979, the Tojomon (Tojo gate) and the Nishisumiyagura in the honmaru were re-built. Besides these reconstructions, only the castle's ruins still remain, though the city of Izushi retains its grid layout which was arranged for military purposes around the castle. A shrine is sited within the ruins, with 37 torii and 157 stone steps leading up to it. On the remains of the mihariyagura stands the Shinkoro, a traditional Japanese wooden clock tower. Following the Meiji Restoration, a western-style clock was installed in it. It is seen as the symbol of the town.

== Sources ==
- http://www.yomiuri.co.jp/dy/columns/0005/lens137.htm
- https://web.archive.org/web/20080504120839/http://www.jcastle.info/castle/profile/24-Izushi-Castle
