= Yamana Yoshinori =

Japanese samurai (d. 1219)

Yamana Yoshinori (山名 義範, died February 1219) was a Japanese samurai lord of the Kamakura period. He served as Governor of Izu Province and was the founder of the Yamana clan. He was also known as Yamana Kaja and Yamana Saburō.

== Life ==
Yamana was born the son of Nitta Yoshishige. His family descended from the Seiwa Genji lineage of the Minamoto clan.

He lived in Yamana township in Kōzuke Province (present-day Yamana, Takazaki, Gunma Prefecture), taking the surname "Yamana", thus establishing the Yamana clan.

On September 24, 1185, Yamana was appointed Governor (kami) of Izu Province.

He served shogun Minamoto no Yoritomo, and participated in the Genpei War (1180-1185) and the Battle of Ōshū (1189) under his command.

After the Revenge of the Soga Brothers incident in June 1193, Yamana was among the retainers present during the questioning of Soga Tokimune, one of the perpetrators of the incident.

In 1195, Yamana accompanied Yoritomo on his visit to the Imperial Palace in Kyoto.

Yamana died in February 1219.

== See also ==
- Revenge of the Soga Brothers
- Nitta clan
- Genpei War
- Battle of Ōshū
