= Yeonorang and Seonyeo =

Korean folk tale

"Yeonorang and Seonyeo (Korean: 연오랑과 세오녀; Hanja: 延烏郞과 細烏女)" also known as "Yeono and Seo (연오와 세오)" is a story about Yeonorang and Seonyeo, people of Silla, who crossed over to Japan, but the sun and moon of Silla lost their light and a ritual was held with the silk sent by Seonyeo to restore their light to the sun and moon.

== History ==
It is said to have been published in the collection of fairy tales Suijeon, which is known to have been compiled around the 11th century. The first data left is from the 13th century in the chapter of 'Gi-i' (기이) in the Samguk Yusa. In addition, it is included in the Pilwonjapgi, which was written around the 15th century.

== Plot ==
In the fourth year of Adalla, the eighth king of Silla, there lived a married couple named Yeonorang and Seonyeo in the eastern shore of the Korean peninsula. One day, Yeono^{Name} went to the sea to work and was suddenly carried away by a rock and washed away to Japan. The Japanese people saw this and believed that he was a nobleman, and made him the king of Japan. Seo^{Name} went to look for her husband, found her husband's shoes, climbed the rock, and the rock also carried Seo to Japan. Seeing this, the people told Yeono, the king, and Seo became the queen of Japan. After that, the sun and moon lost their light in Silla. Ilgwan wanted to go to Japan and bring the couple back because the spirit of the sun and the moon had gone to Japan, but Yeono said that he was here by heaven's order and could not return. Instead, he gave Seo the silk he had woven and said to use it to hold the ceremony. When the Ilgwan hold the ceremony as told, the sun and moon became the same as before. The silk was placed in a royal treasury and made a national treasure, and the storehouse was called Gwibigo (귀비고), and the place where the ancestral rites were held was called Yeongilhyeon (영일현; 迎日縣) or Dogiya (도기야; 都祈野). Yeongilhyeon has been now merged into Pohang, North Gyeongsang Province.

^Name The rang is a suffix for a male and the nyeo for a woman. Thus they can be called Yeono and Seo, respectively.

== Analysis ==
It has been studied by paying attention to the fact that it has the characteristics of a solar-moon courtship myth, that it reveals the movement of the sun god, and that it symbolically describes the exchange relationship between Korea and Japan. Since there are tales with a similar structure in Japan, there have been studies proving that the Japanese sun god and sun goddess correspond to Yeonoh and Seo in the "Samguk yusa", respectively. This is also a hypothesis that proves the influence relationship between Korean and Japanese myths. This hypothesis can also be applied to the process of interpreting tales centering on the movement of the sun god or the sun-mood god. The claim that it symbolically described the process of collective migration from the Yeongil region of Silla to Japan and the propagation of the culture of worshiping the sun god was derived from this. The fact that 'Dogiya', which is described as another name for Yeongilhyeon, where the ancestral rites were held directly, has the meaning of 'Dojideul', that is, 'Sunrise' is an additional basis. The suffices -ya and -deul both means 'field.' The custom of worshiping the sun god was also propagated in this process. In addition, studies on the actual performance of rituals are being conducted based on the interpretation that Yeono and Seo not only mean gods, but also can be the subjects of the rituals in charge of rituals. The fact that Seo performed the ritual with silk woven shows the process of accepting silk as sacred through the principle of metonymy, and is an example of the creation of religious objects of faith.

A similar story about an individual from Silla going over to Japan is found in the legend of Amenohiboko.

== Characteristics ==
It symbolically reveals the aspects of exchange and movement between Korea and Japan in ancient times, and at the same time has a function as a solar-moon-coordinating myth. It is simply interpreted as the origin story of the sun and moon, and it is also used in the process of inferring the influence relationship of Korean and Japanese myths by interpreting it centering on the sun god. In that it is almost the only story about the relationship between Korea and Japan in ancient times, it can be seen as a story that implies the historical context of exchanges between the two countries. There are examples of the myth of the sun and the moon having the properties of a creation myth, but in Yeonorang and Seonyeo, this motif of the creation myth can be said to be symbolically built through the specific historical context of exchanges between ancient Silla and Japan.

== See also ==
- Adalla of Silla
- Amenohiboko
