= Yamana Suketoyo =

Japanese samurai

- 山名 祐豊
- Born: 1511; Tajima Province
- Died: 2 July 1580 (aged 68–69)
- Military career
- Rank: Daimyō
- Commands: Konosumiyama Castle, Arikoyama Castle

Yamana Suketoyo (山名 祐豊; 1511 – 1580) was a Japanese samurai and commander of the Sengoku period. He was the last head of the Tajima Yamana clan. Yamana clan was the Shugo of the Tajima. He owned Ikuno Silver Mine and started full-scale development.

Yamana clan's home castle Konosumiyama castle was attacked by the Oda clan's large force led by Hashiba Hideyoshi and Suketoyo fled to Sakai. Suketoyo expressed his obedience to Oda Nobunaga and was allowed to rule part of the Tajima. He built Arikoyama castle and move from Konosumiyama castle in 1574.

When the relationship between Oda clan and Mōri clan worsened, Suketoyo had an ambiguous attitude about which side to take, Oda clan thought Suketoyo was on the side of Mōri, his Arikoyama castle was attacked, and he surrendered. Suketoyo died of illness five days after the fall of Arikoyama castle.

His family including Yamana Akihiro escaped to Hōki.

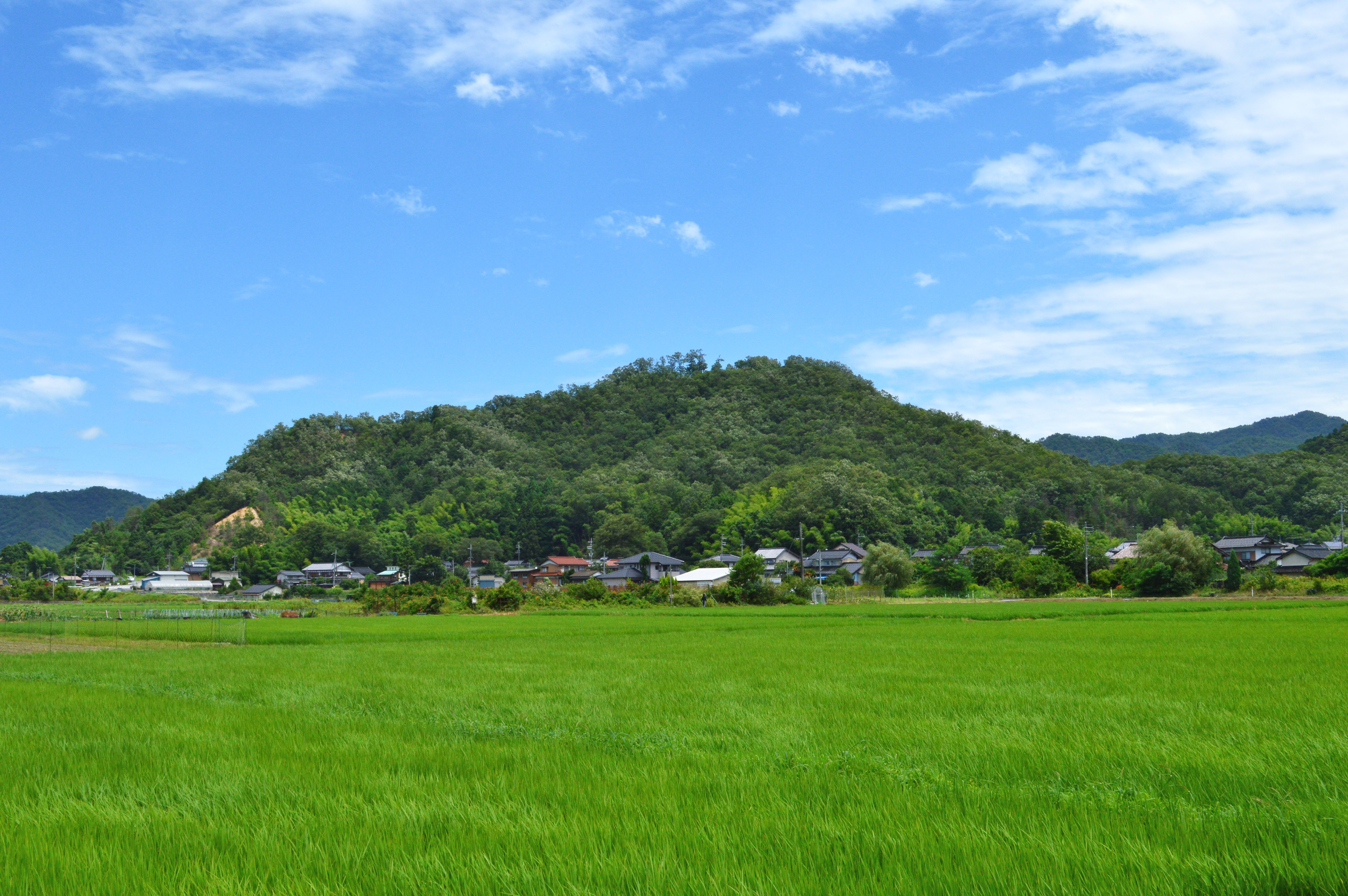
Konosumiyama Castle

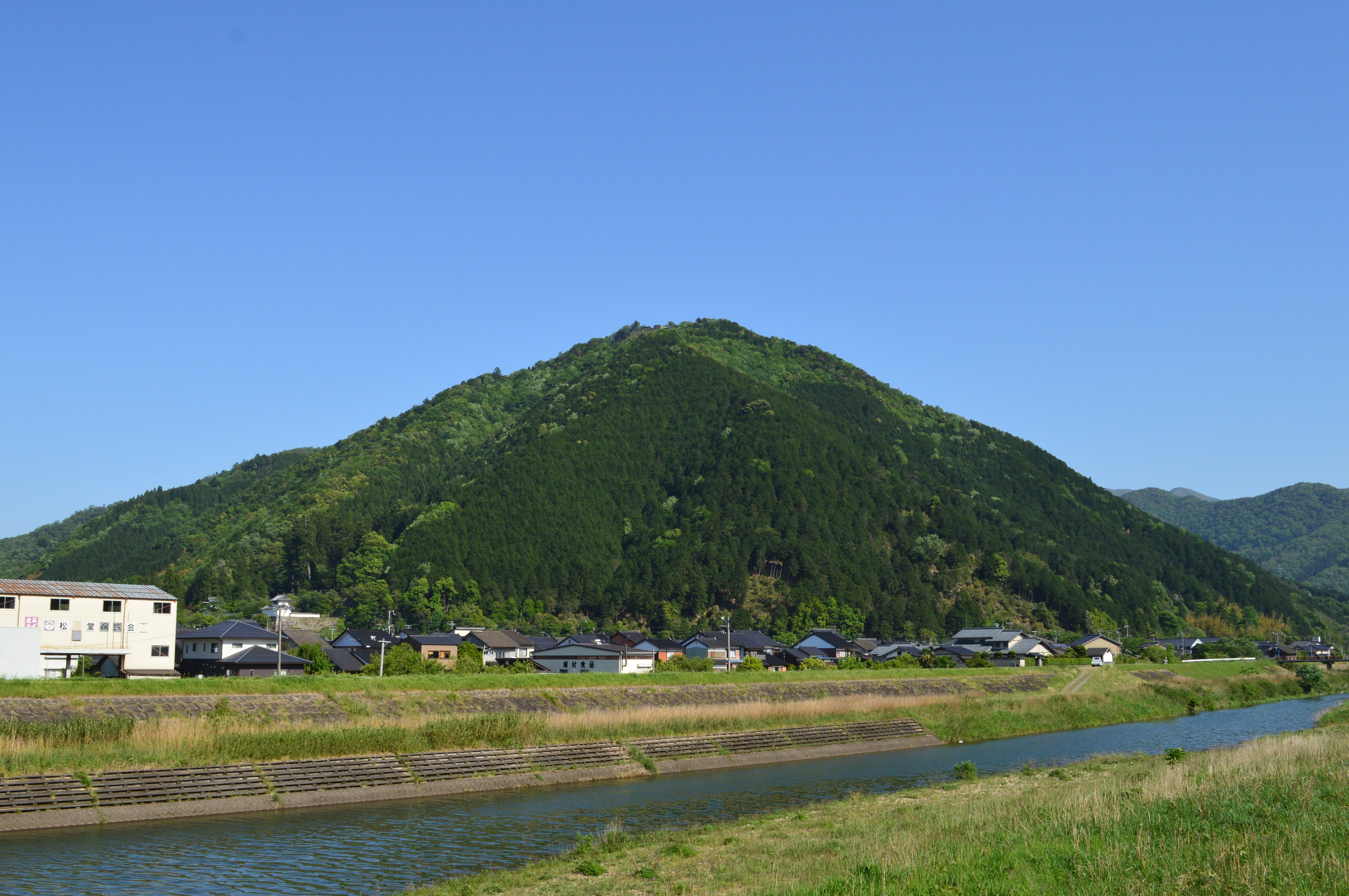
Arikoyama Castle
