= Izushi Domain =

Japanese feudal domain located in Tajima Province

Izushi Domain 出石藩
- under Tokugawa shogunate Japan
- 1600–1871
- Capital: Izushi Castle
- Area
  - Coordinates: 35°27′37.56″N 134°52′27.31″E
  - Type: Daimyō
- Historical era: Edo period
  - Established: 1600
  - Koide clan: 1600
  - Fujii-Matsudaira clan: 1697
  - Sengoku clan: 1706
  - Disestablished: 1871
- Today part of: part of Hyogo Prefecture

Location of Izushi Castle
Izushi Domain (Japan)

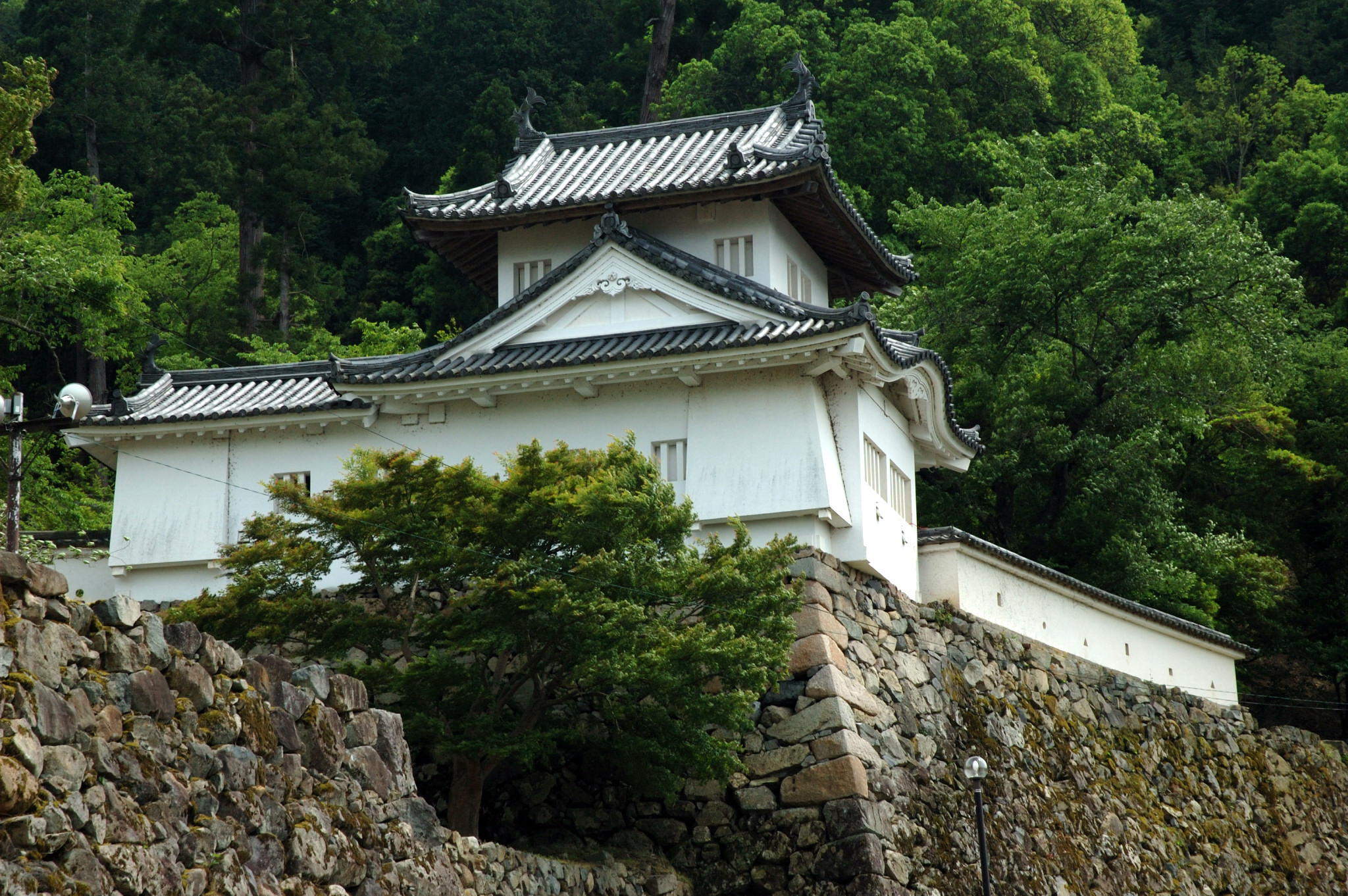
Izushi Castle

Izushi Domain (出石藩, Izushi-han) was a feudal domain under the Tokugawa shogunate of Edo period Japan, located in Tajima Province in what is now the northern portion of modern-day Hyōgo Prefecture. It was centered initially around Izushi Castle in what is now the Izushi neighborhood of the city of Toyooka, Hyōgo.

== History ==
From the Muromachi period, Tajima Province had been under the control of the Yamana clan. However, in the Sengoku period, the area was conquered by Oda Nobunaga. During the Battle of Sekigahara, Koide Yoshimasa and his father Koide Hidemasa attacked Tanabe Castle which was under the control Hosokawa Fujitaka during the Siege of Tanabe. Despite being on the losing side of the war, Tokugawa Ieyasu forgave the Koide clan as Hidemasa's second son, Koide Hideie, served in the Eastern Army with a force of 300 cavalrymen at his father's behest, and distinguished himself greatly against the Uesugi clan and at the Battle Sekigahara. Koide Hidemasa was made daimyō of Kishiwada Domain with a kokudaka of 30,000 koku and Koide Yoshimasa was given Izushi Domain with a kokudaka of 60,000 koku. On Hidemasa's death in 1604, Yoshimasa was transferred to Kishiwada, which was increased to 50,000 koku, and Izushi went to his son, Koide Yoshifusa. However, Yoshifusa's younger brother and heir, Koide Yoshichika was transferred to Sonobe Domain in Tanba Province, and Yoshifusa returned to Izushi in 1619, which was reduced to 50,000 koku to match his former holdings in Kishiwada. The Koide clan continued to rule Izushi until the 9th daimyō, Koide Yoshitsugu, who died at the age of one in 1696.

The Koide were replaced by Matsudaira Tadachika of the Fujii-Matsudaira clan, formerly of Iwatsuki Domain. He was reassigned to Ueda Domain in 1706, and Sengoku Masaakira came from Ueda to Izushi in exchange. The Sengoku clan would continue to rule Izushi until the Meiji restoration. Under the 7th daimyō, Sengoku Hisatoshi, the domain was beset by peasant's revolts on two occasions. The first revolt, in 1835, was serious enough to warrant direct intervention by the shogunate, and resulted in the domain being punished by a reduction in its kokudaka from 58,000 to 30,000 koku. The domain sat out the Boshin War without incident. In 1871, with the abolition of the han system, Izushi Domain became "Izushi Prefecture". and subsequently became part of Hyogo Prefecture. The Sengoku clan was later ennobled with the kazoku peerage title of shishaku (viscount), and the final daimyō, Sengoku Masakata went on to serve in the House of Peers from 1890 to his death in 1917.

== Holdings at the end of the Edo period ==
Unlike most domains in the han system, which consisted of several discontinuous territories calculated to provide the assigned kokudaka, based on periodic cadastral surveys and projected agricultural yields, Toyooka Domain was a single unified holding.

- Tajima Province
  - 9 villages in Yabu District
  - 5 villages in Keta District
  - 27 villages in Mikumi District
  - 76 villages in Izushi District

== List of daimyō ==
#	Name	Tenure	Courtesy title	Court Rank	kokudaka
Koide clan, 1600-1696 (Tozama)
1	Koide Yoshimasa (小出吉政)	1600 - 1604	Shinano-no-kami (信濃守)	Junior 4th Rank, Lower Grade (従四位下)	60,000 koku
2	Koide Yoshifusa (小出吉英)	1604 - 1613	Yamato-no-kami (大和守)	Junior 5th Rank, Lower Grade (従五位下)	60,000 koku
3	Koide Yoshichika (小出吉親)	1613 - 1619	Shinano-no-kami (信濃守)	Junior 4th Rank, Lower Grade (従四位下)	60,000 koku
4	Koide Yoshifusa (小出吉英)	1619 - 1666	Yamato-no-kami (大和守)	Junior 5th Rank, Lower Grade (従五位下)	60,000 ->50,000 koku
5	Koide Yoshishige (小出吉重)	1666 - 1673	Shuri-no-suke (修理亮)	Junior 5th Rank, Lower Grade (従五位下)	50,000 koku
6	Koide Fusayasu (小出英安)	1673 - 1691	Bizen-no-kami (備前守)	Junior 5th Rank, Lower Grade (従五位下)	50,000 koku
7	Koide Fusaeki (小出英益)	1692	Yamato-no-kami (大和守)	Junior 5th Rank, Lower Grade (従五位下)	50,000 koku
8	Koide Fusanaga (小出英長)	1692 - 1694	Yamato-no-kami (大和守)	Junior 5th Rank, Lower Grade (従五位下)	50,000 koku
9	Koide Fusatsugu (小出英及)	1695 - 1696	-none-	-none-	50,000 koku
Fujii-Matsudaira clan, 1697-1706 (Fudai)
1	Matsudaira Tadachika (松平忠周)	1697 - 1706	Iga-no-kami (伊賀守); Jijū (侍従)	Junior 4th Rank, Lower Grade (従四位下)	48,000 koku
Sengoku clan, 1706-1871 (Tozama)
1	Sengoku Masaakira (仙石政明)	1706 - 1717	Echizen-no-kami (越前守)	Junior 5th Rank, Lower Grade (従五位下)	58,000 koku
2	Sengoku Masafusa (仙石政房)	1717 - 1735	Shinano-no-kami (信濃守)	Junior 5th Rank, Lower Grade (従五位下)	58,000 koku
3	Sengoku Masatoki (仙石政辰)	1735 - 1779	Echizen-no-kami (越前守)	Junior 5th Rank, Lower Grade (従五位下)	58,000 koku
4	Sengoku Hisayuki (仙石久行)	1779 - 1785	Gyobu-shoyu (刑部少輔)	Junior 5th Rank, Lower Grade (従五位下)	58,000 koku
5	Sengoku Hisamichi (仙石久道)	1785 - 1814	Echizen-no-kami (越前守)	Junior 5th Rank, Lower Grade (従五位下)	58,000 koku
6	Sengoku Masayoshi (仙石政美)	1814 - 1824	Echizen-no-kami (越前守)	Junior 5th Rank, Lower Grade (従五位下)	58,000 koku
7	Sengoku Hisatoshi (仙石久利)	1824 - 1870	Echizen-no-kami (越前守)	Junior 5th Rank, Lower Grade (従五位下)	58,000 -> 30,000 koku
8	Sengoku Hisakata (仙石政固)	1870 - 1871	Echizen-no-kami (越前守)	Junior 5th Rank, Lower Grade (従五位下)	30,000 koku

== See also ==
- List of Han
- Abolition of the han system
