= Tajima Province =

Former province of Japan

Map of Japanese provinces (1868) with Tajima Province highlighted

Tajima Province (但馬国, Tajima no Kuni; Japanese pronunciation: [tä́.(d͡)ʑì.mä̀ (nò̞ kɯ̈̀.ɲ̟ì)]) was a province of Japan in the area of northern Hyōgo Prefecture. Tajima bordered on Tango and Tanba to the east, Harima to the south, and Inaba to the west. Its abbreviated form name was Tanshū (但州). In terms of the Gokishichidō system, Tajimao was one of the provinces of the San'indō circuit. Under the Engishiki classification system, Tajima was ranked as one of the "superior countries" (上国) in terms of importance, and one of the "near countries" (近国) in terms of distance from the capital. The provincial capital was located in what is now the city of Toyooka. The ichinomiya of the province is the Izushi Shrine also located in Toyooka. The area of the province was 2099.01 square kilometers.

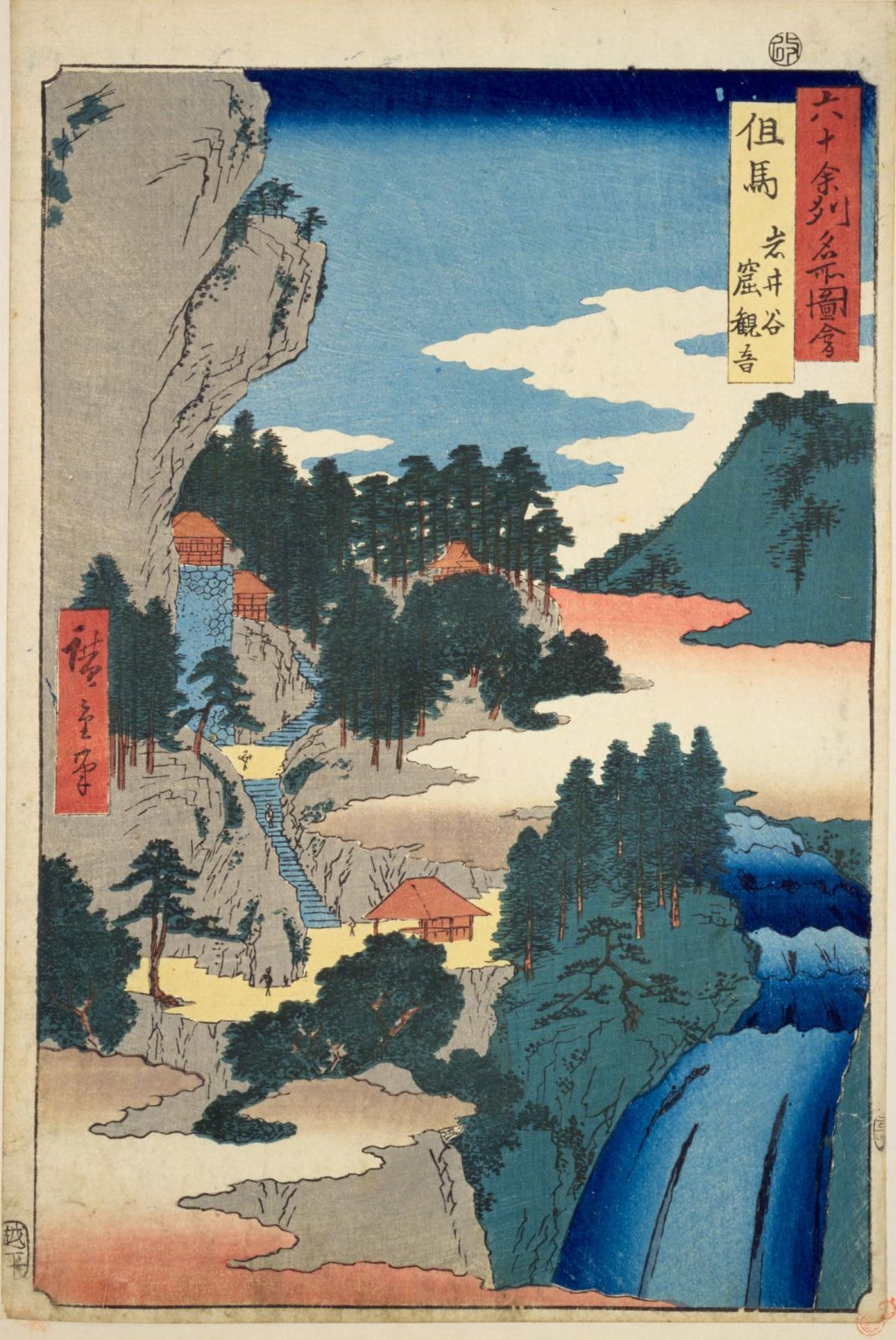
Hiroshige ukiyo-e "Tajima" in "The Famous Scenes of the Sixty States" (六十余州名所図会), depicting The Iwaya Kannon chapel in Iwaidani Gorge

== History ==
=== Early history ===
The early history of the Tajima region is uncertain. There appear to have been two power centers. The Tajima Kuni no miyatsuko ruled in eastern Tajima (present-day Asago District and Yabu District) and are mentioned in the Kujiki. They tenuously claimed descent from then legendary Emperor Kaika, and eventually took the surname of "Tajima". The Chasuriyama Kofun and the Miidani Kofun Cluster are located in their territory. Western Tajima (present-day Mita District) was under the control of the Futakata Kuni no miyatsuko, who claimed descent from the rulers of Izumo. At some point, the two areas came under the control the ancient Tanba Kingdom, which was later divided into Tajima, Tango and Tanba. However, since the name "Tajima" appears in the Nihon Shoki, in an entry dated 675 AD, this division occurred before the formalization of the Japanese provinces.

The "Wamyō Ruijushō" states that the provincial capital was located in Keta District, possibly in the Izucho neighborhood of Toyooka city, but the precise location is uncertain. According to "Nihon Koki", the capital was related to a place called "Kodago", also in Keta District in the year 804. This appears to correspond the Nyogamori site which has been excavated near the former Hidaka town hall, which is also part of Toyooka city. The site of the Tajima Kokubun-ji (also in Toyooka) is known, and is a National Historic Site. The Engishiki records of 927 lists ten major and 106 minor Shinto shrines, with Kono Jinja and Awaga Jinja vying for the title of the ichinomiya of the province.

During the early Muromachi period, the Yamana clan were shugo of Tajima province and constructed Konosumiyama Castle as their stronghold. They were later defeated by the forces of Toyotomi Hideyoshi.

=== Edo Period ===
During the Edo Period, Tango province was somewhat of a backwater, due to its geographical location. The Ikuno silver mine was tenryō territory directly administered by the shogunate. Two small domains were established in Tajima under the Tokugawa shogunate. Toyooka Domain was created for Sugihara Nagafusa, who had married a daughter of Azai Nagamasa. In 1658 the line went extinct, and in 1668 the shogunate transferred a cadet branch of the Kyōgoku clan from Tango-Tanabe Domain to Toyooka. Izushi Domain was established for Koide Yoshimasa, the son of one of Ieyasu's generals. In 1706, it was awarded to the Sengoku clan, who ruled until the Meiji restoration.

The Yamana clan, formerly rulers of 11 provinces had been reduced in status the Battle of Sekigahara to a small hatamoto holding of 6700 koku in Shitsumi district. Yamana Toyokuni was allowed to construct a jin'ya and although it was a poor territory, his descendants opened mines, new rice fields, fostered raising cattle and gradually raided their revenues until 1868, when the reached the 11,000 koku level and were allowed to become daimyō by the new Meiji government. However, the title was abolished only a few months later, and the Yamana served as imperial governors of "Muraoka Prefecture" until the abolition of the han system in 1871. The final ruler, Yamana Yoshimichi, was ennobled with the kazoku title of baron (danshaku).

Bakumatsu period domains
Name	Clan	Type	kokudaka
Toyooka	Kyōgoku clan	Tozama	70,000 koku
Izushi	Sengoku clan	Tozama	20,000 koku
Muraoka	Yamana clan	-NA-	10,000 koku

== Meiji period ==
Following the Meiji restoration, each of the domains (Toyooka, Izushi and Muraoka) briefly became prefectures, which were annexed to Sasayama Prefecture in August 1871, transferred to Toyooka Prefecture in December 1871 and incorporated into Hyōgo Prefecture in August 1876. Per the early Meiji period Kyudaka kyuryo Torishirabe-chō (旧高旧領取調帳), an official government assessment of the nation’s resources, the province had 620 villages with a total kokudaka of 144,312 koku. Tajima Province consisted of:

Districts of Tajima Province
District	kokudaka	Controlled by	at present	Currently
Asago (朝来郡)	20,739 koku	Tenryō (3 towns, 69 villages); Sasayama (1 town, 15 villages)	dissolved	Asago
Yabu (養父郡)	23,692 koku	Tenryō (92 villages); Izushi (12 villages)	dissolved	Yabu, part of Asago
Futakata (二方郡)	8,940 koku	Tenryō (25 villages); Toyooka (29 villages)	merged with Shitsumi District to become Mikata District (美方郡) on April 1, 1896	Shin'onsen, part of Kami, Hyōgo
Shitsumi (七美郡)	8,783 koku	Tenryō (70 villages)	merged with Futakata District to become Mikata District on April 1, 1896	part of Kami, small part of Yabu
Keta (気多郡)	19,959 koku	Tenryō (72 villages); Izushi (6 villages) joint (11 villages) joint Tenryō/Izushi (1 village)	merged into Kinosaki District (along with Mikumi District) on April 1, 1896	part of Toyooka
Kinosaki (城崎郡)	21,660 koku	Tenryō (50 villages); Toyooka (1 town, 27 villages)	absorbed Keta and Mikumi Districts on April 1, 1896; now dissolved	part of Toyooka
Mikumi (美含郡)	11,628 koku	Tenryō (43 villages); Izushi (28 villages)	merged into Kinosaki District (along with Keta District) on April 1, 1896	part of Kami, part of Toyooka
Izushi (出石郡)	28,007 koku	Tenryō (4 villages); Izushi (1 town, 83 villages)	dissolved	part of Toyooka

== Gallery ==
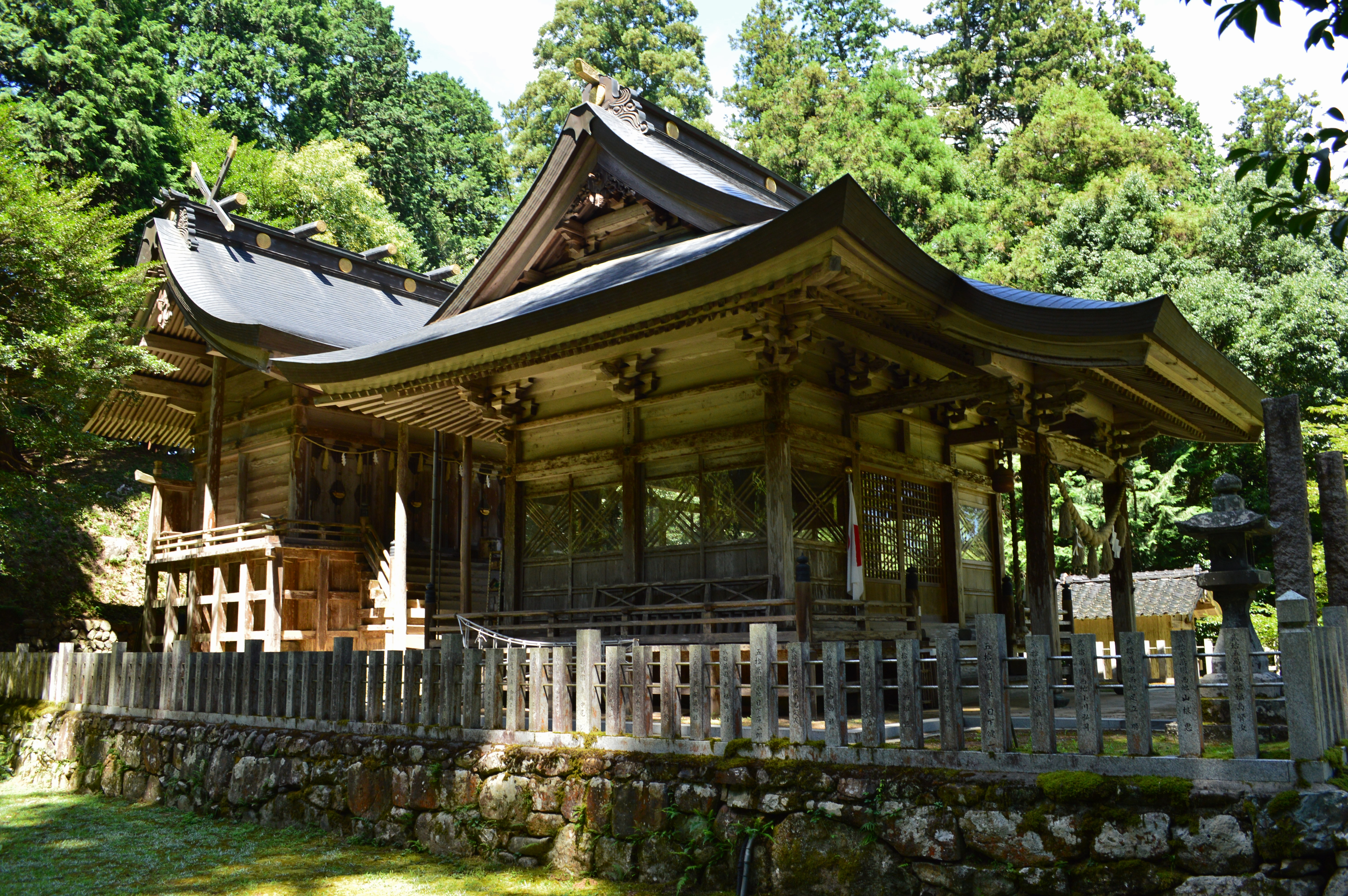
Awaga Jinja, ichinomiya of the province

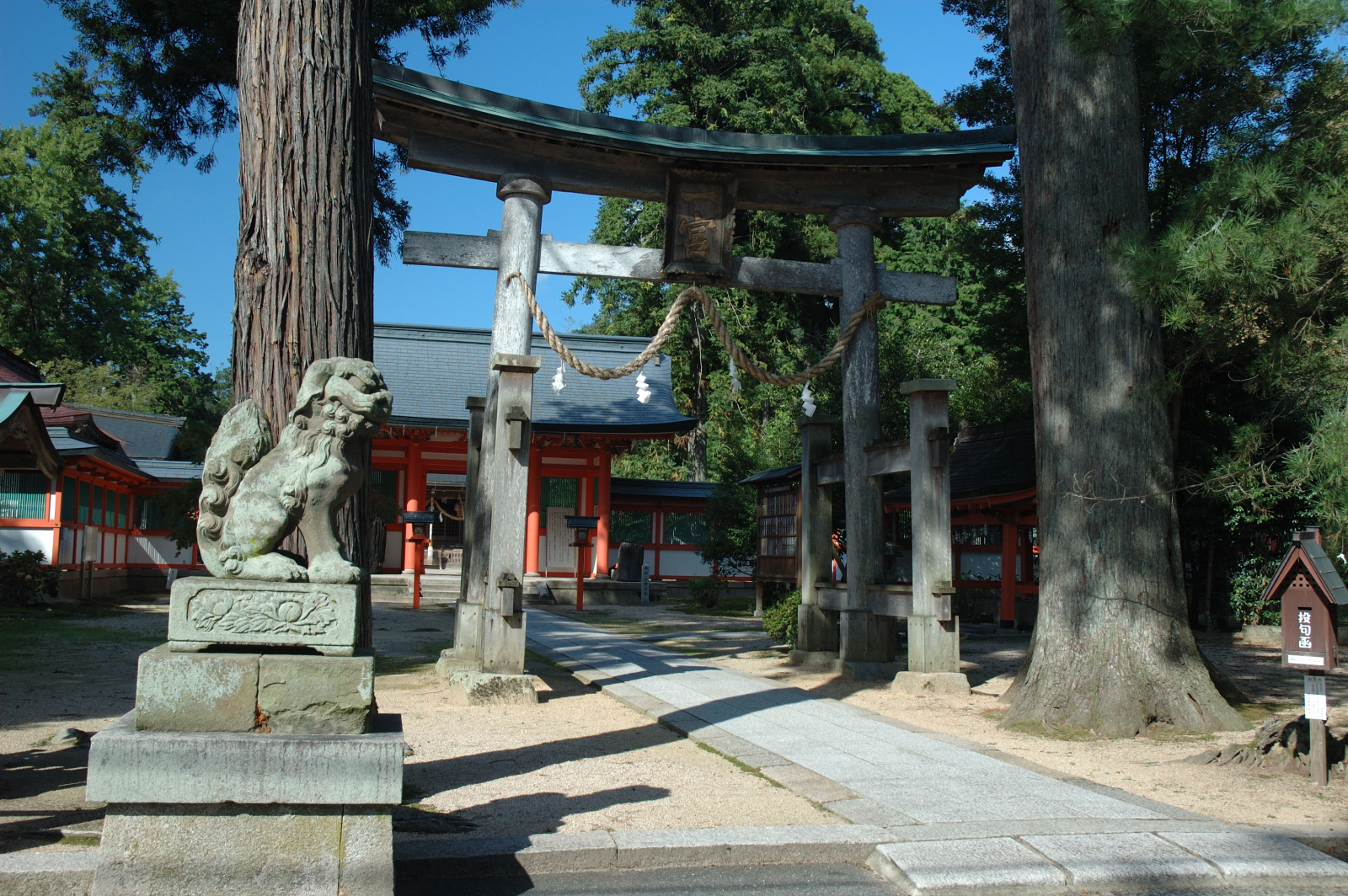
Izushi Jinja, ichinomiya of the province

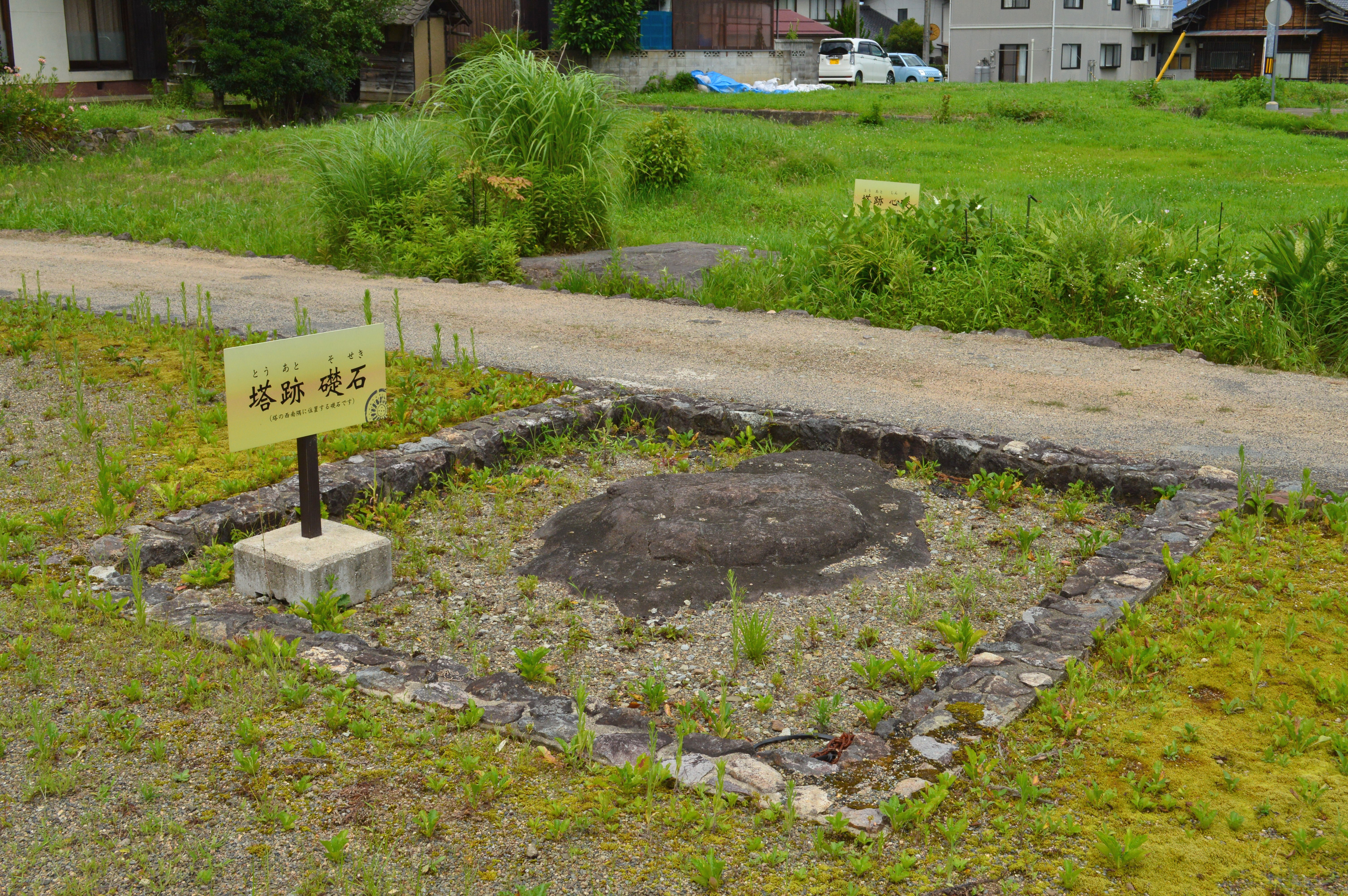
Ruins of Tajima Kokubun-ji

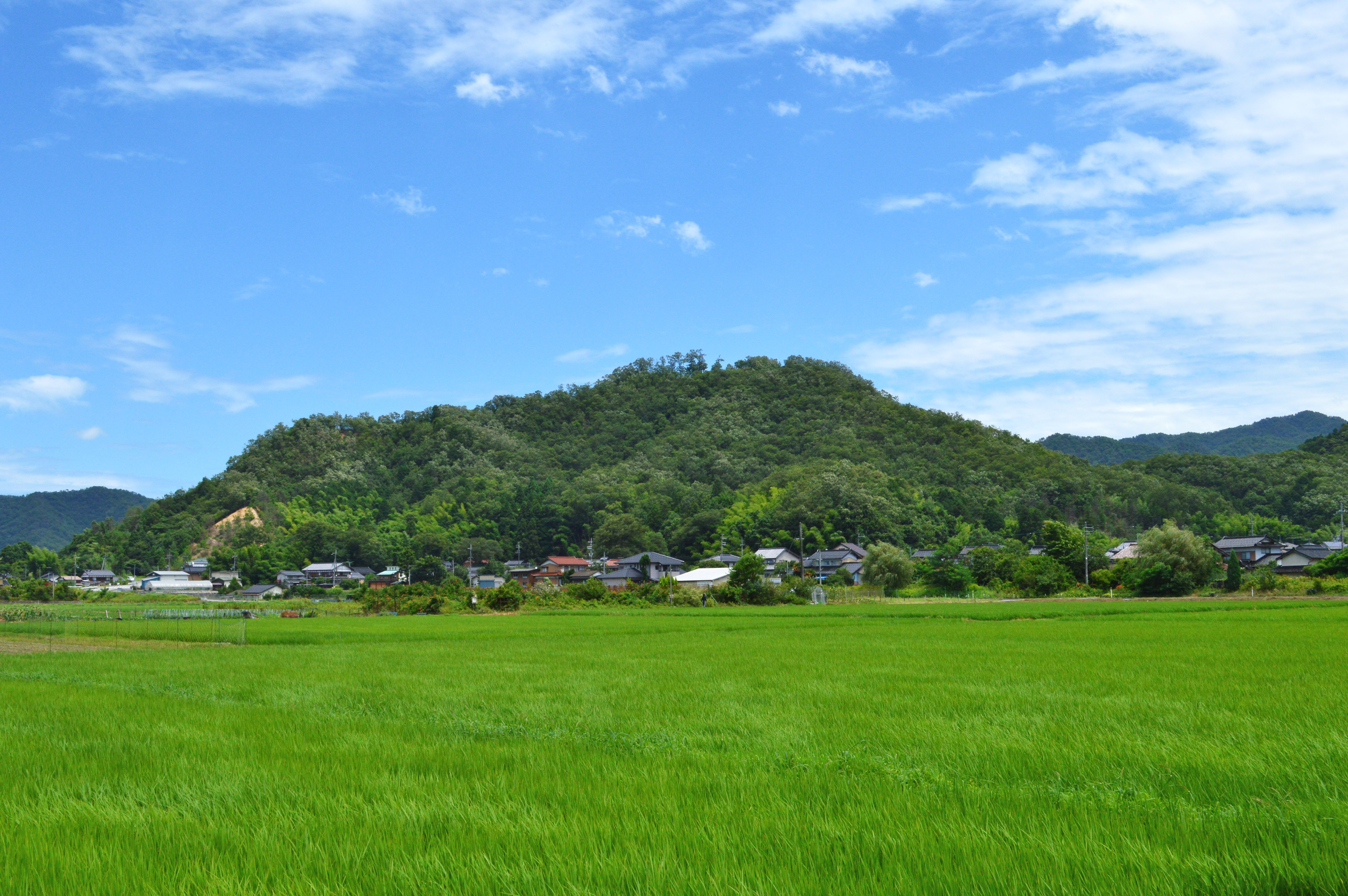
Site of Konosumiyama Castle

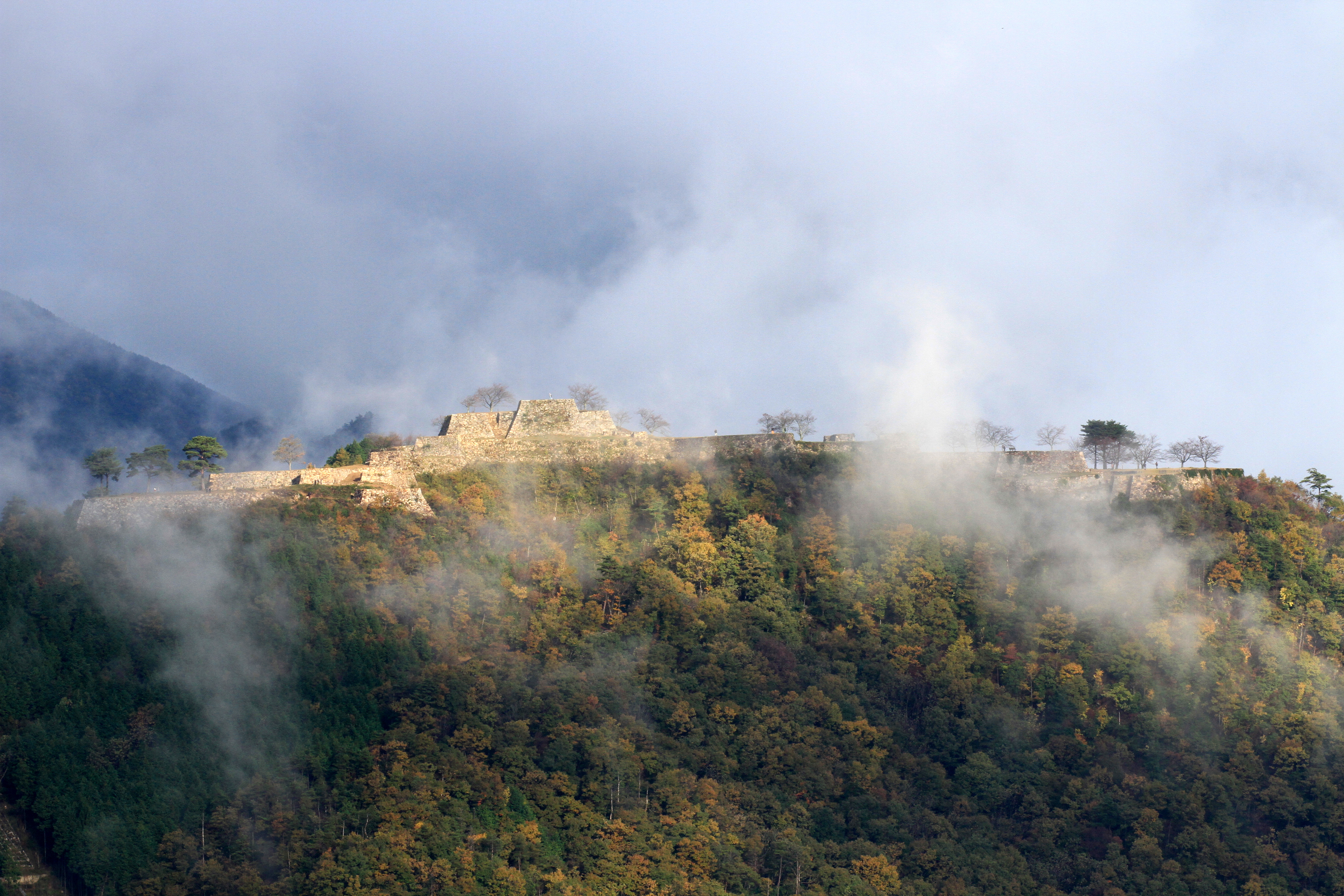
ruins of Takeda Castle
