= Sengoku clan =

Japanese samurai clan

Sengoku clan (仙石 氏, Sengoku shi) was a Japanese samurai family which descended from the Seiwa-Genji.

== History ==
The family origins were in Mino Province. In the early Edo period, the Sengoku were at Komoro Domain. In 1706, the family was moved to Izushi Domain with 30,000 koku revenues. The clan remained in Tajima Province until the end of the Edo period. The head of the clan became a kazoku viscount in the Meiji period.

== Select list of clan members ==
- Sengoku Hisamori
- Sengoku Hidehisa
- Sengoku Tadamasa
