= Maeno Nagayasu =

Japanese samurai

Maeno Nagayasu (前野 長康; 1528 – September 22, 1595) was a Japanese samurai and Sengoku Daimyo of the 16th century. Also known as Shōemon (将右衛門), he served Toyotomi Hideyoshi from an early age.
