= Yamana clan =

Japanese samurai clan

Yamana 山名
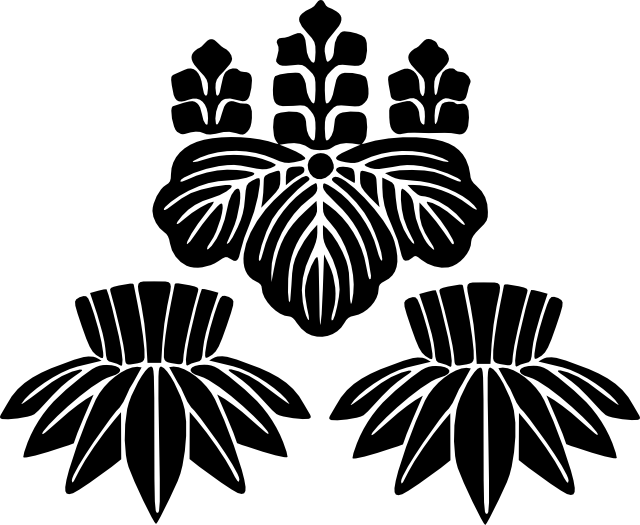
- Mon crest of the Yamana clan
- Home province: Kōzuke Province
- Parent house: Seiwa Genji, Nitta clan
- Titles: various
- Founder: Yamana Yoshinori
- Founding year: 12th century

The Yamana clan (山名氏, Yamana-shi) was a Japanese samurai clan which was one of the most powerful of the Muromachi period (1336–1467); at its peak, members of the family held the position of Constable (shugo) over eleven provinces. Originally from Kōzuke Province, and later centered in Inaba Province, the clan claimed descendance from the Seiwa Genji line, and from Minamoto no Yoshishige in particular. The clan took its name from the village of Yamana in present-day Gunma Prefecture. They were valued retainers under Minamoto no Yoritomo, and counted among his gokenin.

The Yamana were among the chief clans in fighting for the establishment of the Ashikaga shogunate, and thus remained valued and powerful under the new government. They were Constables of five provinces in 1363, and eleven a short time later. However, members of the Yamana clan rebelled against the shogunate in the Meitoku Rebellion of 1391 and lost most of their land. Yamana Sōzen (1404 – 1473), likely the most famous member of the clan, would regain these lands in 1441. Through all of this the clan managed to somehow retain a great degree of reputation and power within the shogunate government; along with the Hosokawa and Hatakeyama clans, they served as agents of the shogunate in resolving various disputes.

Sōzen would then become embroiled in a conflict with Hosokawa Katsumoto over naming the shōgun's successor; this conflict grew into the Ōnin War, which destroyed much of Kyoto, and led to the fall of the shogunate and beginning of the Sengoku period. In the end this cost the Yamana much of their former influence and land. By the end of the 16th century, the Yamana had been reduced to holding the better part of Inaba Province. That area would be retained by the Yamana even until the end of the Edo period.

== Notable clan members ==
- Yamana Yoshinori – founder of the Yamana clan.
- Yamana Tokiuji (late 14th century) – fought in the Nanboku-chō Wars, first for the shogunate, and then against it.
- Yamana Tsunehisa (early 15th century) – shugo of Bingo province
- Yamana Sōzen (1404–1473) – played a crucial role in sparking the outbreak of the Ōnin War.
- Yamana Koretoyo – Sōzen's son, fought against his father in the Ōnin War.
- Yamana Suketoyo (1511 -1580) – Developed the Ikuno Silver Mine, built Arikoyama Castle. Defeated by the Oda Clan in 1580.
- Yamana Toyokuni (1548–1626) – defeated by Toyotomi Hideyoshi in 1580, later fought at the Battle of Sekigahara and was given a small territory thereafter by Tokugawa Ieyasu.

== Popular culture ==
Yamana is a playable nation in Europa Universalis IV.

In Akira Kurosawa's 1958 film The Hidden Fortress, the Yamana clan serve as the antagonists to the Akizuki clan. The Hidden Fortress anachronistically placed the Yamana clan adjacent to the Akizuki clan. However, Akizuki was based in Kyushu, while Yamana was in central Honshu, north of Edo.

== See also ==
- Tōrin-in, family temple
