= Tango-Tanabe Domain =

Japanese feudal domain located in Tango Province

Tango-Tanabe Domain 丹後田辺藩
- under Tokugawa shogunate Japan
- 1600–1871
- Capital: Tanabe Castle (Maizuru Castle)
- Area
  - Coordinates: 35°26′44.81″N 135°19′51.51″E
  - Type: Daimyō
- Historical era: Edo period
  - Established: 1600
  - Kyōgoku clan: 1600
  - Makino clan: 1668
  - Disestablished: 1871
- Today part of: part of Kyoto Prefecture

Location of Tanabe Castle
Tango-Tanabe Domain (Japan)

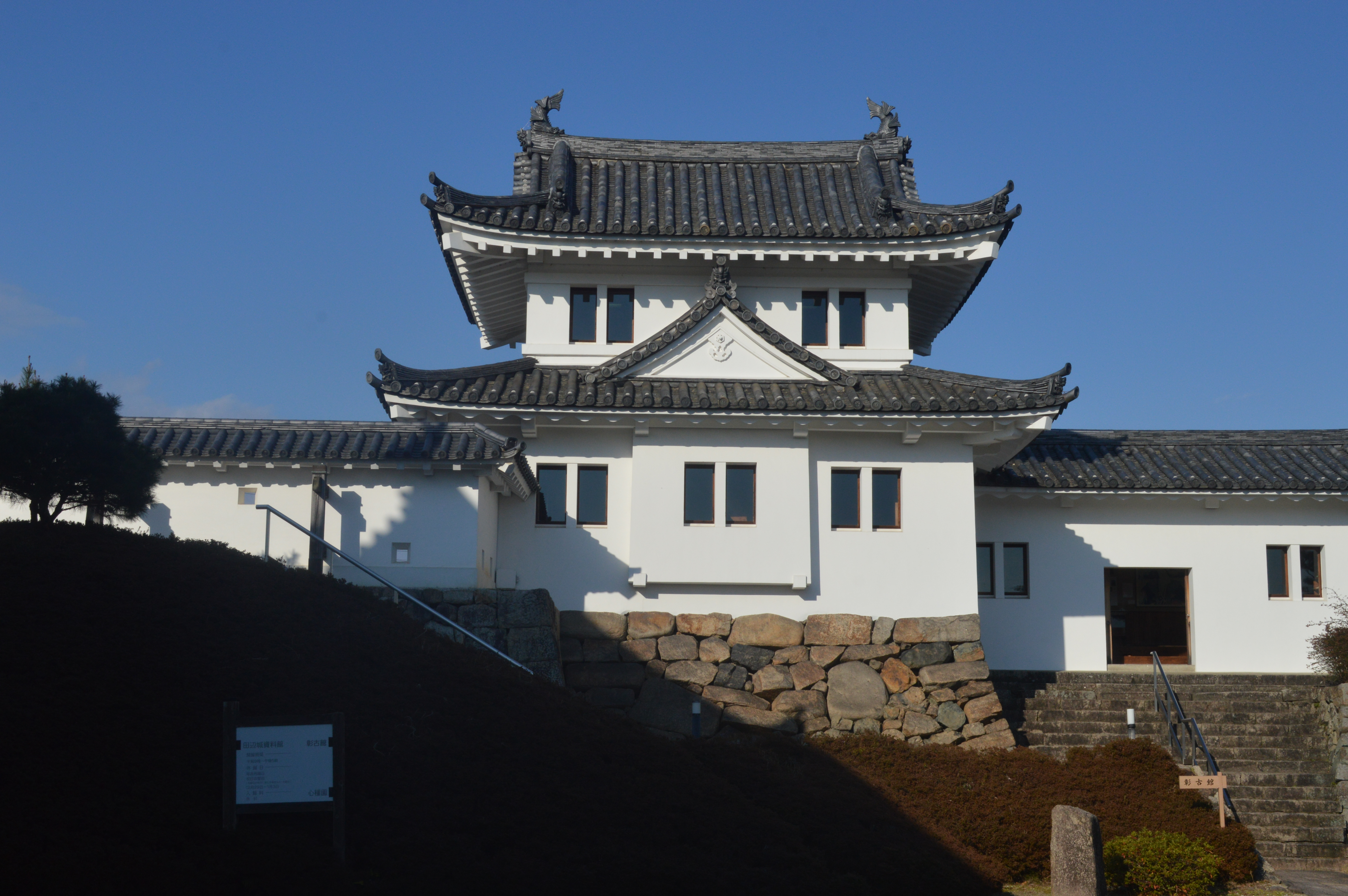
Maizuru Castle

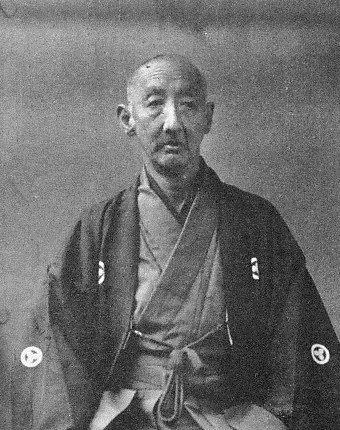
Makino Sukeshige, final daimyō of Tango-Tanabe

Tango-Tanabe Domain (丹後田辺藩, Tango-Tanabe-han) was a feudal domain under the Tokugawa shogunate of Edo period Japan, located in Tango Province in what is now the northern portion of modern-day Kyoto Prefecture. It was centered around Tanabe Castle, also known as Maizuru Castle which was located in what is now the city of Maizuru, Kyoto. The area of Tango-Tanabe Domain covered the entire area of Kasa County, and corresponds to the current area of the city of Maizuru, and parts of Yura, Miyazu, and Fukuchiyama.

== History ==
From the Muromachi period, Tango Province had been under the control of the Isshiki clan. However, in the Sengoku period, Toyotomi Hideyoshi placed the province under the control of Hosokawa Tadaoki. Following the Battle of Sekigahara, Tokugawa Ieyasu awarded the entire province of Tango to Kyōgoku Takatomo, who established Miyazu Domain. To ensure the succession of his line, Kyōgoku Takatomo gave 35,000 koku of his holdings to his third son, Kyōgoku Takamitsu, and established a cadet branch of the clan at Tango-Tanabe Domain, and 10,000 koku to his grandson, Kyōgoku Takamichi, who established Mineyama Domain. This proved to be a wise decision, his grandson Kyōgoku Takakuni was charged with misconduct and poor governance by the Tokugawa shogunate and reduced to hatamoto status in 1666.

The third generation Kyōgoku Takamori gave 2000 koku to his younger brother to establish a cadet branch of the clan in 1663, and was transferred to Toyooka Domain in Tajima Province in 1668. The Kyōgoku were replaced by a cadet branch of the Makino clan from Settsu Province, who ruled until the Meiji restoration. During the tumultuous Bakumatsu period, the domain supported the Tokugawa shogunate in the First Chōshū expedition, but at the start of the Boshin War was ordered to remain at Maizuru to guard the Sea of Japan coast. At the time of the Battle of Toba-Fushimi, the domain switched sides to the imperial cause. Tango-Tanabe Domain became "Maizuru Domain" in 1869 and Maizuru Prefecture in 1871 with the abolition of the han system. It subsequently became part of Kyoto Prefecture in 1876. The Makino clan was later ennobled with the kazoku peerage title of shishaku (viscount).

== Holdings at the end of the Edo period ==
Unlike most domains in the han system, which consisted of several discontinuous territories calculated to provide the assigned kokudaka, based on periodic cadastral surveys and projected agricultural yields, Tango-Tanabe Domain was a single unified holding.

- Tango Province
  - 137 villages in Kasa District

== List of daimyō ==
#	Name	Tenure	Courtesy title	Court Rank	kokudaka
Kyōgoku clan, 1600-1668 (Tozama)
1	Kyōgoku Takamitsu (京極高三)	1600 - 1636	Shuri-no-daifu (修理大夫)	Junior 5th Rank, Lower Grade (従五位下)	35,000 koku
2	Kyōgoku Tananao (京極高直)	1636 - 1663	Hida-no-kami (飛騨守)	Junior 5th Rank, Lower Grade (従五位下)	35,000 koku
3	Kyōgoku Takamori (京極高盛)	1663 - 1668	Ise-no-kami (伊勢守)	Junior 5th Rank, Lower Grade (従五位下)	35,000->33,000 koku
Makino clan, 1668-1871 (Fudai)
1	Makino Chikashige (牧野親成)	1668 - 1671	Sado-no-kami(佐渡守); Jijū (侍従)	Junior 4th Rank, Lower Grade (従四位下)	35,000 koku
2	Makino Tomishige (牧野富成)	1671 - 1693	Inaba-no-kami (因幡守)	Junior 5th Rank, Lower Grade (従五位下)	35,000 koku
3	Makino Hideshige (牧野英成)	1693 - 1737	Kawachi-no-kami (河内守)	Junior 5th Rank, Lower Grade (従五位下)	35,000 koku
4	Makino Akishige (牧野明成)	1737 - 1750	Inaba-no-kami (因幡守)	Junior 5th Rank, Lower Grade (従五位下)	35,000 koku
5	Makino Koreshige (牧野惟成)	1750 - 1783	Buzen-no-kami (豊前守)	Junior 5th Rank, Lower Grade (従五位下)	35,000 koku
6	Makino Fusashige (牧野宣成)	1783 - 1804	Sado-no-kami (佐渡守)	Junior 5th Rank, Lower Grade (従五位下)	35,000 koku
7	Makiwo Mochishige (牧野以成)	1804 - 1825	Buzen-no-kami (豊前守)	Junior 5th Rank, Lower Grade (従五位下)	35,000 koku
8	Makino Tokishige (牧野節成)	1825 - 1852	Kawachi-no-kami (河内守)	Junior 5th Rank, Lower Grade (従五位下)	35,000 koku
9	Makino Takashige (牧野誠成)	1852 - 1869	Kawachi-no-kami (河内守)	Junior 5th Rank, Lower Grade (従五位下)	35,000 koku
10	Makino Sukeshige (牧野弼成)	1869 - 1871	Takumi-no-kami (内匠頭)	Junior 5th Rank, Lower Grade (従五位下)	35,000 koku

== See also ==
- List of Han
- Abolition of the han system
