= Isshiki =

Isshiki (written: 一色) is a Japanese surname. Notable people with the surname include:

- Makoto Isshiki (一色 まこと), Japanese manga artist
- Sae Isshiki (一色 紗英, born 1977), Japanese actress
- Isshiki Yoshimichi (一色 義道, died 1579), Japanese samurai and daimyō
- Isshiki Yoshisada (一色 義定, died 1582), Japanese samurai and daimyō

Fictional characters:

- Akane Isshiki, protagonist of the anime series Vividred Operation
- Iroha Isshiki, a character in My Teen Romantic Comedy SNAFU
- Makoto Isshiki, a character in RahXephon
- Satoshi Isshiki, a character in Food Wars!: Shokugeki no Soma

== See also ==
- Isshiki clan
- Isshiki, Aichi, former town in Aichi Prefecture, Japan
