= Makino Hideshige =

Makino Hideshige (牧野 英成; October 13, 1671 – October 28, 1741), also known as Makino Hidenari (牧野 英成), was a Japanese daimyō of the early Edo period.

The Makino were identified as one of the fudai or insider daimyō clans which were hereditary vassals or allies of the Tokugawa clan, in contrast with the tozama or outsider clans.

== Makino clan genealogy ==
The fudai Makino clan originated in 16th century Mikawa Province. Their elevation in status by Toyotomi Hideyoshi dates from 1588. They claim descent from Takechiuchi no Sukune, who was a legendary Statesman and lover of the legendary Empress Jingū.

Hideshige was part of a cadet branch of the Makino which was created in 1633. The Makino were installed at Sekiyado Domain in Shimōsa Province in 1644. From 1668 through the Meiji Restoration, the descendants had holdings at Tanabe Domain (35,000 koku) in Tango Province. Descendants lived from 1634 through 1868 at Mineyama Domain (11,000 koku) in Echigo Province.

The head of this clan line was ennobled as a "Viscount" in the Meiji period.

== Tokugawa official ==
Hideshige served the Tokugawa shogunate as its seventeenth Kyoto shoshidai in the period spanning January 28, 1725 through July 6, 1734.

== Notes ==
Preceded by _____	3rd Daimyō of Tanabe; 17??–1741	Succeeded by _____
Preceded by Matsudaira Tadachika	17th Kyoto Shoshidai; 1724–1734	Succeeded by Toki Yoritoshi
