= Takatomi =

- Gender: Male

Origin
- Origin: Japanese
- Meaning: Different meanings depending on the kanji used

Takatomi (written: 高富 or 貴富) is a masculine Japanese given name. Notable people with the name include:

- Kyōgoku Takatomi (京極 高富) (1835–1889), Japanese daimyō
- Takatomi Nobunaga (信長 貴富) (born 1971), Japanese composer

== See also ==
- Takatomi Domain (高富藩, Takatomi han), domain of Japan
