= Mineyama Domain =

Mineyama Domain may refer to:

- Mineyama Domain (Tango) (峯山藩), in Tango Province of Edo period Japan
- Mineyama Domain (Echigo) (三根山藩), a Bakumatsu period domain in Echigo Province, Japan
