= Nobunaga (name) =

- Gender: Male

Origin
- Origin: Japanese
- Meaning: Different meanings depending on the kanji used

Nobunaga (written: 信長) is both a Japanese masculine name & surname. Notable people with the surname include:

== Given Name ==
- Fujiwara no Nobunaga (藤原 信長; 1022 – 1094), Japanese noble
- Oda Nobunaga (織田 信長; 1534 – 1582), Japanese daimyō
- Nobunaga Sato (佐藤 信長; born 1970), Japanese former basketball coach
- Nobunaga Shimazaki (島﨑 信長; born 1988), Japanese voice actor

== Surname ==
- Takatomi Nobunaga (信長 貴富; born 1971), Japanese composer of choral music

== Fictional Characters ==
- Nobunaga Amari (甘利信長), a character from Inuyasha
- Nobunaga Asaji (朝地 信長), a character from ReLIFE
- Nobunaga Asakura (朝倉 信長), a character from Nogizaka Haruka no Himitsu
- Nobunaga Hazama (ノブナガ゠ハザマ), a character from Hunter X Hunter
- Nobunaga Kiyota (清田 信長), a character from Slam Dunk
- Nobunaga Oda (織田 信長), a character based on the real Nobunaga Oda from Drifters
