= Toki Yoritoshi =

Daimyo in the Tokugawa shogunate

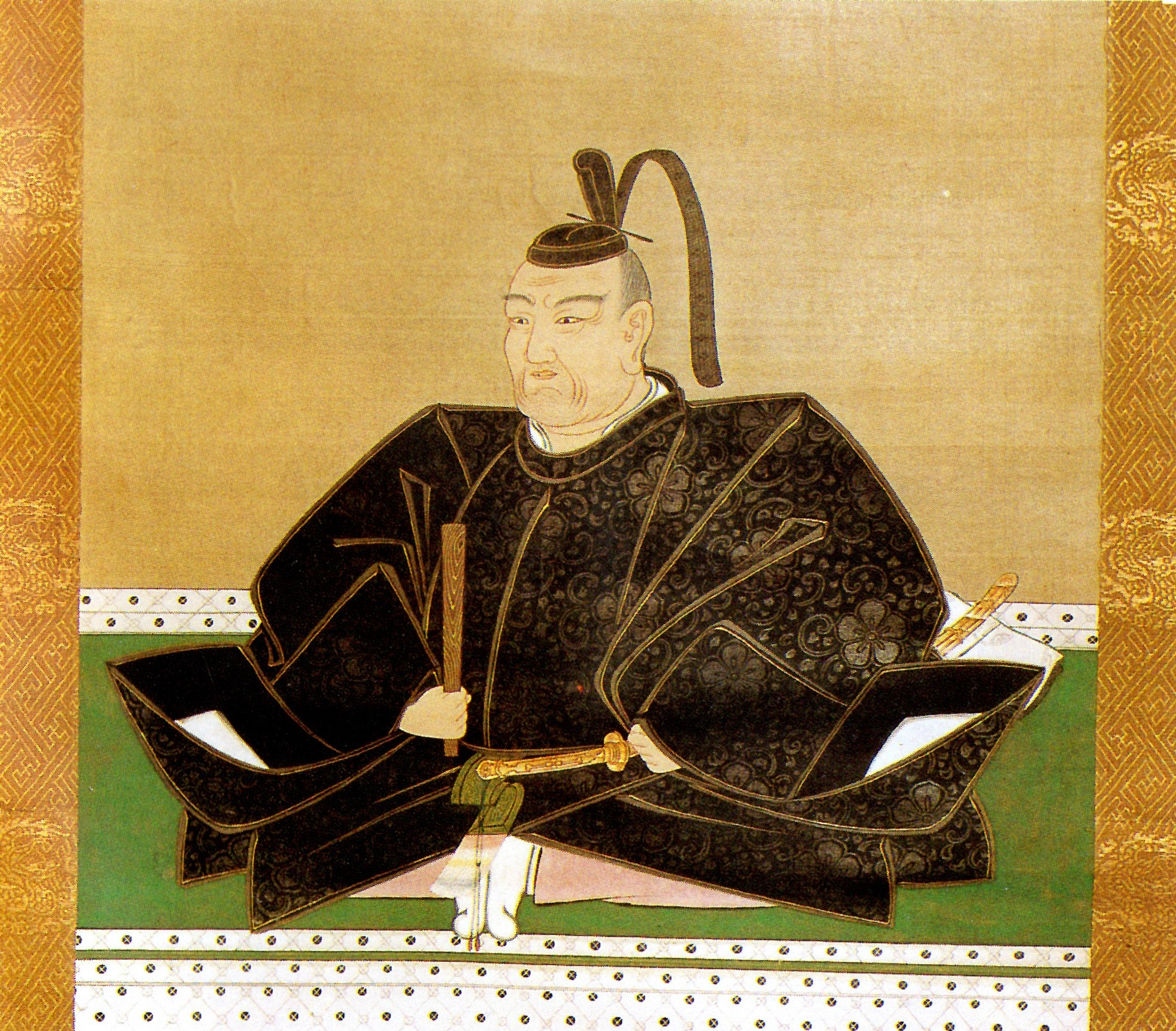
Toki Yoritoshi

Toki Yoritoshi (土岐 頼稔, March 20, 1695 – October 17, 1744) was a Japanese daimyō of the Edo period. He served in a variety of positions in the Tokugawa shogunate, including Kyoto Shoshidai (1734–1732) and rōjū.

== In culture ==
At some point, there was a devastating fire in Heian-kyō while Toki Tango-no-kami held the office of Kyoto shoshidai. Shortly afterwards, a clever poem which included a play on the shoshidai's name was widely circulated:

Toki mo toki
Tango no gogatsuban ni
kaji dashite
Edo e shiretariya
Mi-shoshi senban.
- A conventional English translation (Frederic Shoberl, 1822): "Such is the time at present: a fire broke out in the fifth night of the fifth month. When the news shall have reached Edo, there will be numberless applicants who will harass you without ceasing."
- A more literal English translation (Timon Screech, 2006):

At this very time
On Tango's evening
Fire broke out
Edo was informed
For the noble governor
Much [trouble].

The 18th century poet was Kazehaya Yoshizane, who puns "Tango" (Tango no sekku), one of the five main festivals of the year (falling on the 5th day of the 5th month), with the daimyo's toponym, "Tango" (Tango Province). Poetry of this sort was an element of popular culture in this period. Witty and timely word play which somehow married puns on a personal name with a current event became fashionable. It could engender broad public approval, and occasionally such poetry might even receive approbation from the emperor.

== Notes ==
Preceded by Makino Hideshige	17th Kyoto Shoshidai; 1734–1742	Succeeded by Makino Sadamichi
