= Kyōgoku Takatomi =

Viscount Kyōgoku Takatomi
- 京極高富
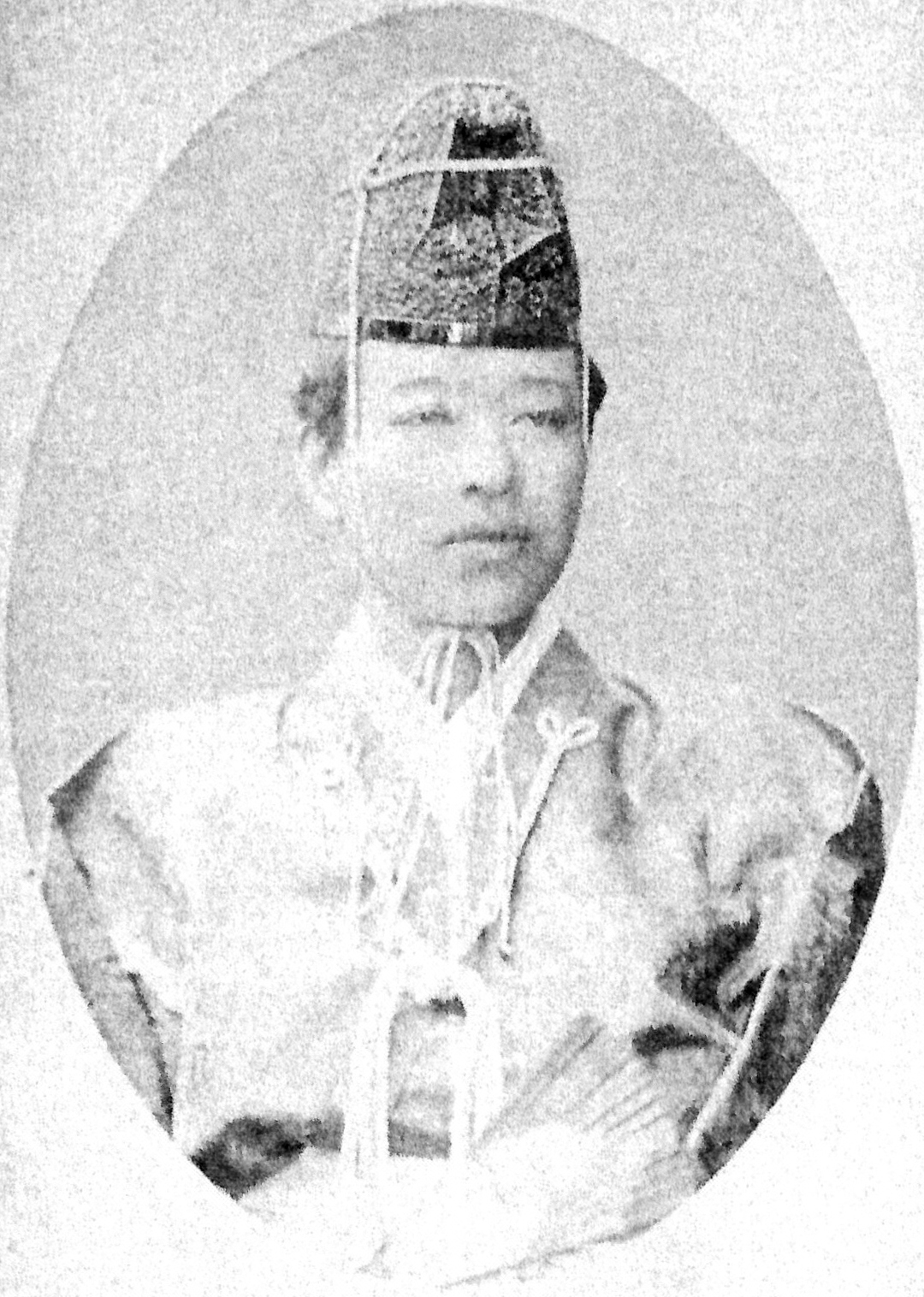
- Kyōgoku Takatomi

11th daimyō of Mineyama
- In office 1849–1868
- Monarchs: Tokugawa Ieyoshi; Tokugawa Iesada; Tokugawa Iemochi; Tokugawa Yoshinobu; Emperor Meiji
- Preceded by: Kyōgoku Takakage
- Succeeded by: Kyōgoku Takanobu

Personal details
- Born: January 7, 1836
- Died: February 9, 1889 (aged 53) Tokyo, Japan
- Resting place: Joryu-ji, Kyōtango, Kyoto, Japan
- Citizenship: Japanese
- Parent: Kyōgoku Takakage (father)

Viscount Kyōgoku Takatomi (京極 高富; January 7, 1836 – February 9, 1889), was the 11th daimyō of Mineyama Domain, Tango Province, Japan during the Bakumatsu period.

== Biography ==
Kyōgoku Takatomi was the eldest son of Kyōgoku Takakage, the 10th daimyō of Mineyama. His childhood name was Keijirō. His wife was a daughter of Inagaki Nagakata of Toba Domain. In 1849, he became daimyō on the retirement of his father and received the courtesy title of Bitchū-no-kami, which he later changed to Suo-no-kami. In 1857, he was appointed an Obangashira, and in 1861 took part in campaigns to suppress the Tenchūgumi and other pro-sonnō jōi movements. In 1866 he rose to the position of wakadoshiyori under Shogun Tokugawa Iemochi and during the Second Chōshū expedition was ordered to lead the Tokugawa army across Shikoku and to attack Chōshū Domain from the seaward approaches. He advanced as far as Matsuyama in Iyo Province when the expedition was called off. The following year, he returned home to oversee the military preparations of his own domain, but was soon called upon by the Shogunate to oversee Army affairs at the end of October 1867, followed by the position of Kaigun bugyō overseeing Naval affairs from early December. He resigned his positions in February 1868 and attempted the change allegiance to the new Meiji government. The Meiji authorities were initially suspicious and rejected his offer, but seeing that his adopted son, Kyōgoku Takanobu had already pledged fealty to Emperor Meiji and had sent troops in support of the imperial armies, his petition was eventually granted. However, a few months later, complaining of chest pains, he retired from public life and returned to his domains. In 1875, after the retirement of his adopted son, he resumed chieftainship of the clan. He was given the kazoku peerage title of shishaku (viscount) in 1884.

He died on February 9, 1889, at the age of 55 and his grave is at the Buddhist temple of Joryu-ji in Yoshiwara, Mineyama-chō, Kyōtango city, Kyoto.

== See also ==
- Kyōgoku clan
