= Inadome Sukenao =

Japanese samurai

- 稲富 祐直
- Born: 1552; Tango Province
- Died: 20 March 1611 (aged 58–59)
- Relatives: Inadome Sukehide (grand father)
- Military career
- Commands: Yuminoki Castle
- Conflicts: Siege of Yuminoki Castle, Japanese invasions of Korea (1592–1598)

Inadome Sukenao (稲富 祐直; 1552 – 1611) also known as Inadome Ichimu was a Japanese military engineer and commander of the Sengoku period. He served the Isshiki clan as a senior retainer and later he served Hosokawa Tadaoki.

He was taught gunnery techniques by his grandfather Inadome Sukehide and later he founded Inadome school of gunnery.

Before the Battle of Sekigahara, he took charge of Hosokawa Garasha's protection. When Ishida Mitsunari attempted to take Gracia as a hostage and surrounded Hosokawa clan's residence, he escaped without protecting Garasha.

Later he served the Tokugawa Shogunate as a gunnery instructor.
