= Yoshimichi =

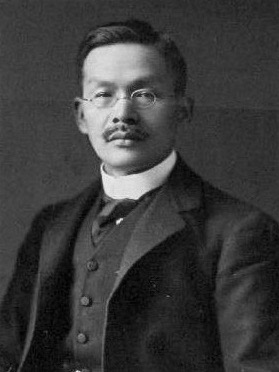
- Yoshimichi Hara (1867–1944), Japanese politician
- Pronunciation: joɕimitɕi (IPA)
- Gender: Male

Origin
- Origin: Japanese
- Meaning: Different meanings depending on the kanji used

Other names
- Alternative spelling: Yosimiti (Kunrei-shiki) Yosimiti (Nihon-shiki) Yoshimichi (Hepburn)

Yoshimichi is a masculine Japanese given name.

== Written forms ==
Yoshimichi can be written using different combinations of kanji characters. Here are some examples:

- 義道, "justice, way"
- 義路, "justice, route"
- 義通, "justice, pass through"
- 佳道, "skilled, way"
- 佳路, "skilled, route"
- 佳通, "skilled, pass through"
- 善道, "virtuous, way"
- 善路, "virtuous, route"
- 善通, "virtuous, pass through"
- 吉道, "good luck, way"
- 吉路, "good luck, route"
- 吉通, "good luck, pass through"
- 良道, "good, way"
- 良路, "good, route"
- 良通, "good, pass through"
- 恭道, "respectful, way"
- 嘉道, "excellent, way"
- 嘉路, "excellent, route"
- 能道, "capacity, way"
- 喜道, "rejoice, way"

The name can also be written in hiragana よしみち or katakana ヨシミチ.

== Notable people with the name ==
- Yoshimichi Hasegawa (長谷川 好道, 1850–1924), Japanese general
- Yoshimichi Hara (原 嘉道, 1867–1944), Japanese politician
- Yoshimichi Inaba (稲葉 良通, 1515–1589), Japanese samurai
- Yoshimichi Isshiki (一色 義道, ????–1579), Japanese daimyō
- Yoshimichi Onodera (小野寺 義道, 1566–1645), Japanese daimyō
- Yoshimichi Tokugawa (徳川 吉通, 1689–1713), Japanese daimyō
