= Yoshisada =

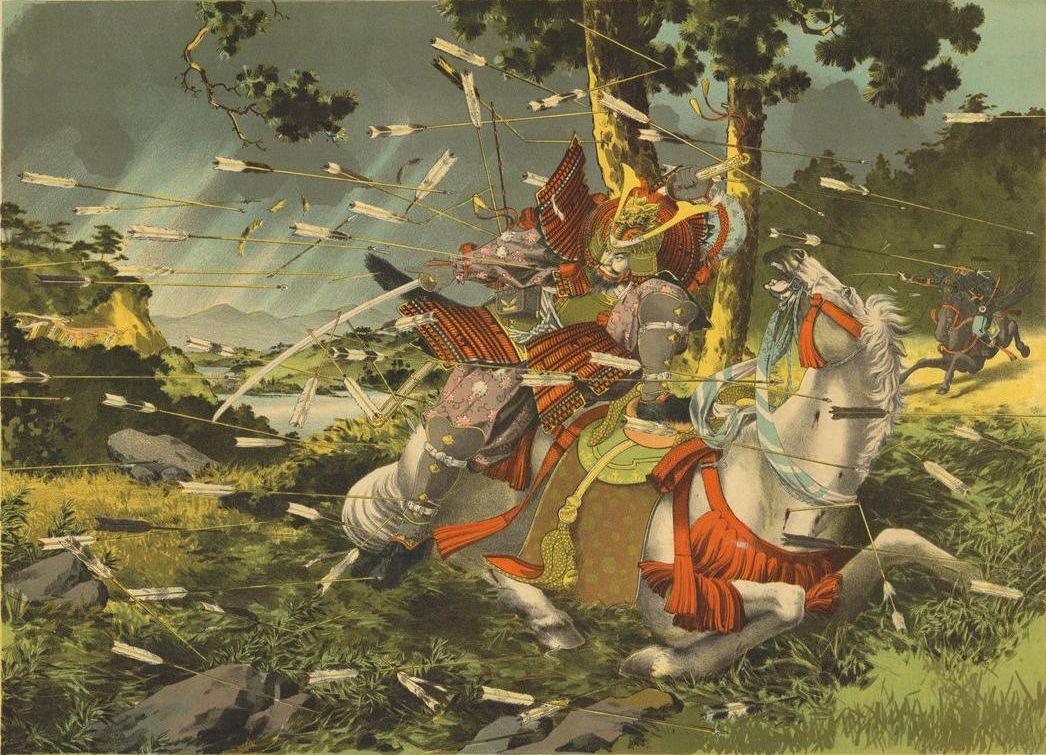
- Yoshisada Nitta (1301–1338), Japanese samurai
- Pronunciation: joɕisada (IPA)
- Gender: Male

Origin
- Origin: Japanese
- Meaning: Different meanings depending on the kanji used

Other names
- Alternative spelling: Yosisada (Kunrei-shiki) Yosisada (Nihon-shiki) Yoshisada (Hepburn)

Yoshisada is a masculine Japanese given name.

== Written forms ==
Yoshisada can be written using different combinations of kanji characters. Here are some examples:

- 義貞, "justice, chastity"
- 義定, "justice, establish"
- 吉貞, "good luck, chastity"
- 吉定, "good luck, establish"
- 善貞, "virtuous, chastity"
- 善定, "virtuous, establish"
- 芳貞, "fragrant/virtuous, chastity"
- 芳定, "fragrant/virtuous, establish"
- 良貞, "good, chastity"
- 良定, "good, establish"
- 喜貞, "rejoice, chastity"
- 喜定, "rejoice, establish"
- 慶貞, "congratulate, chastity"
- 佳定, "skilled, establish"
- 嘉定, "excellent, establish"

The name can also be written in hiragana よしさだ or katakana ヨシサダ.

== Notable people with the name ==
- Yoshisada Isshiki (一色 義定; died 1582), Japanese samurai and daimyō
- Yoshisada Nitta (新田 義貞; 1301–1338), Japanese samurai
- Yoshisada Sakaguchi (坂口 芳貞; born 1939), Japanese actor and voice actor
- Yoshisada Shimizu (清水 義定; born 1943), Japanese astronomer
- Yoshisada Yonezuka (米塚 義定; born 1937), Japanese judoka

== See also ==
- 7300 Yoshisada, a main-belt asteroid
