= Takaharu Kyōgoku =

Japanese businessman and Shinto priest (1938–2024)

Takaharu Kyōgoku (京極 高晴, Kyōgoku Takaharu; January 18, 1938 – May 6, 2024) was a Japanese businessman and Shinto priest.

Kyōgoku was the 15th head of the Kyōgoku clan (the former Tajima Toyooka clan) which held power in Toyooka before and during the Edo period. He was among descendants of the Meiji period kazoku (peerage) which was abolished in 1947.

Kyōgoku died from a epidural hematoma on May 6, 2024, at the age of 86.

== Career ==
The major part of his working career was spent as an executive at the NYK Line shipping company. Then Kyōgoku headed Kantō Eisen (関東曳船株式会社), which is a small tugboat and port transport firm based in Yokohama.

Kyōgoku was named the chief priest (kannushi) of the Yasukuni Shrine in 2009.
