= Mineyama Domain (Echigo) =

Ancient Japanese feudal estate

三根山藩
- under Tokugawa shogunate
- 1634–1871
- Capital: Mineyama Jinya
- Area
  - Coordinates: 37°45′28″N 138°50′38″E
  - Type: Daimyō
- Historical era: Edo period
  - Established: 1634
  - Disestablished: 1871
- Today part of: Niigata Prefecture

Mineyama Domain (Japanese: 三根山藩) was a fudai feudal domain under the Tokugawa shogunate of Edo period Japan. It was located in Echigo Province, in the Hokuriku region of Honshū. The domain was centered at Mineyama, located in modern-day Mineoka in Niigata Prefecture.

== History ==
The domain was created in 1634 (Kan'ei 11) when the lord of Nagaoka Domain Makino Tadanari (Japanese: 牧野忠成) distributed 6,000 koku of territory around Mineyama to his fourth son Makino Sadanari (Japanese: 牧野定成). As the new domain had less than 10,000 koku, Sadanari was designated as a hatamoto samurai instead of a daimyo.

In 1863 (Bunkyū 2), the Tokugawa shogunate formally recognized Mineyama as a feudal domain with 11,000 koku. Unlike many other feudal subjects, the lord Makino Tadayasu (Japanese: 牧野忠泰) was exempted from the requirement of spending time in the capital Edo as dictated by the Sankin-kōtai policy. The administrative center of the domain was located at Mineyama Jinya.

During the Boshin War, Mineyama Domain, along with the other domains under the Makino clan, initially joined the Ōuetsu Reppan Dōmei. It submitted to the new Meiji government in August 1868 (Keiō 4), and subsequently sent troops to aid the latter's conquest of Shōnai Domain. In 1870 (Meiji 3), the name of the domain was changed to Mineoka (Japanese: 嶺岡) to avoid being confused with the Mineyama Domain in Tango Province. In the following year, the domain was abolished and became a part of Niigata Prefecture.

== Bakumatsu period holdings ==
As with most domains in the han system, Mineyama Domain consisted of several discontinuous territories calculated to provide the assigned kokudaka, based on periodic cadastral surveys and projected agricultural yields.

Echigo Province

- Kambara District - 43 villages

== List of daimyō ==
#	Name	Tenure	kokudaka
Makino clan (Hatamoto) 1634–1863
1	Makino Sadanari (牧野定成)	1634–1658	6,000 koku
2	Makino Tadakiyo (牧野忠清)	1658–1682	6,000 koku
3	Makino Tadataka (牧野忠貴)	1682–1706	6,000 koku
4	Makino Tadatsura (牧野忠列)	1706–1746	6,000 koku
5	Makino Tadatomo (牧野忠知)	1746–1785	6,000 koku
6	Makino Tadayoshi (牧野忠義)		6,000 koku
7	Makino Tadahira (牧野忠救)		6,000 koku
8	Makino Tadamori (牧野忠衛)		6,000 koku
9	Makino Tadanao (牧野忠直)		6,000 koku
10	Makino Tadaoki (牧野忠興)		6,000 koku
11	Makino Tadayasu (牧野忠泰)		6,000 koku
Makino clan (Fudai) 1863–1871
1	Makino Tadayasu (牧野忠泰)		11,000 koku

== Gallery ==
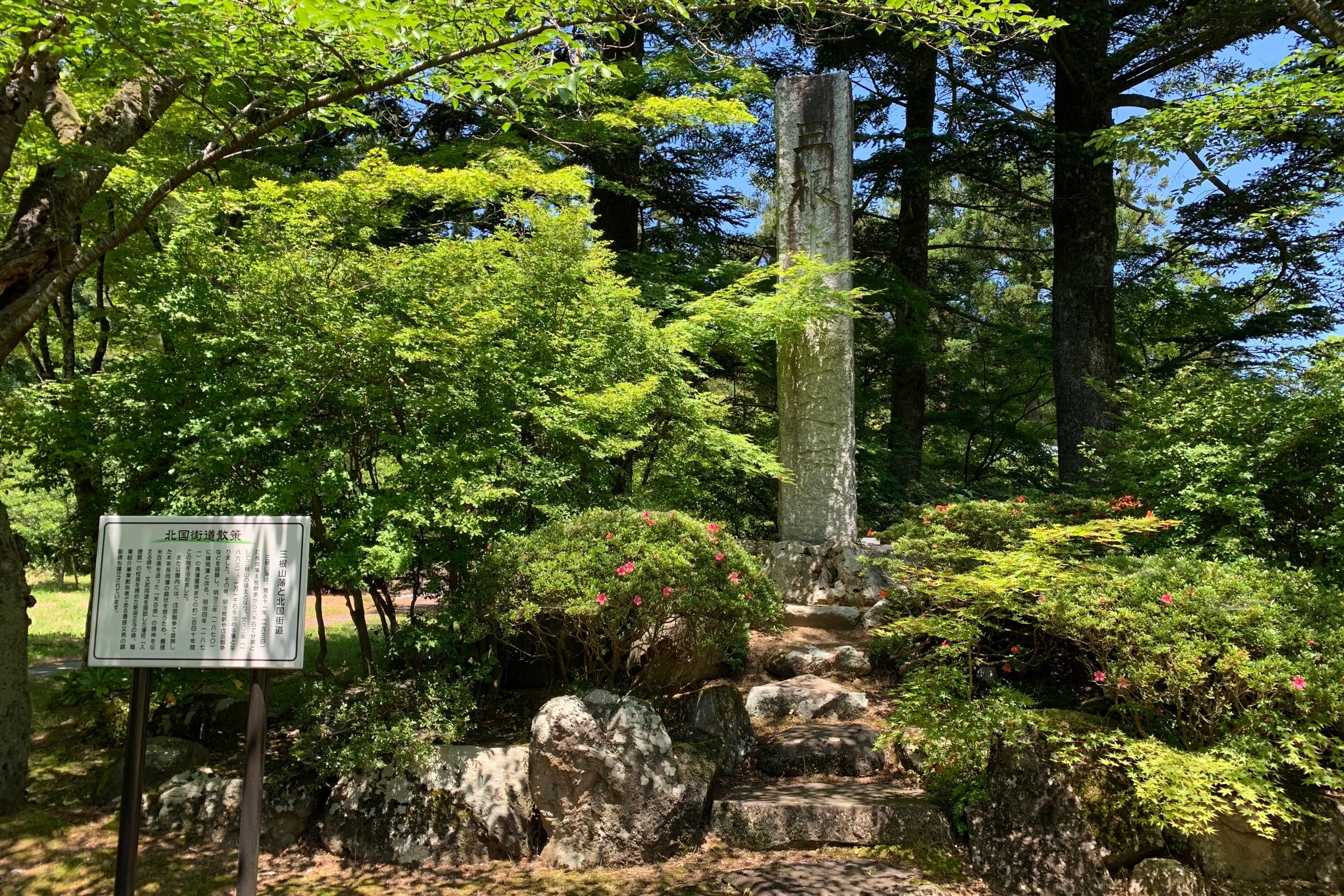
"Mineyama Domain Ruins Monument" located in Mineyama Domain Park.

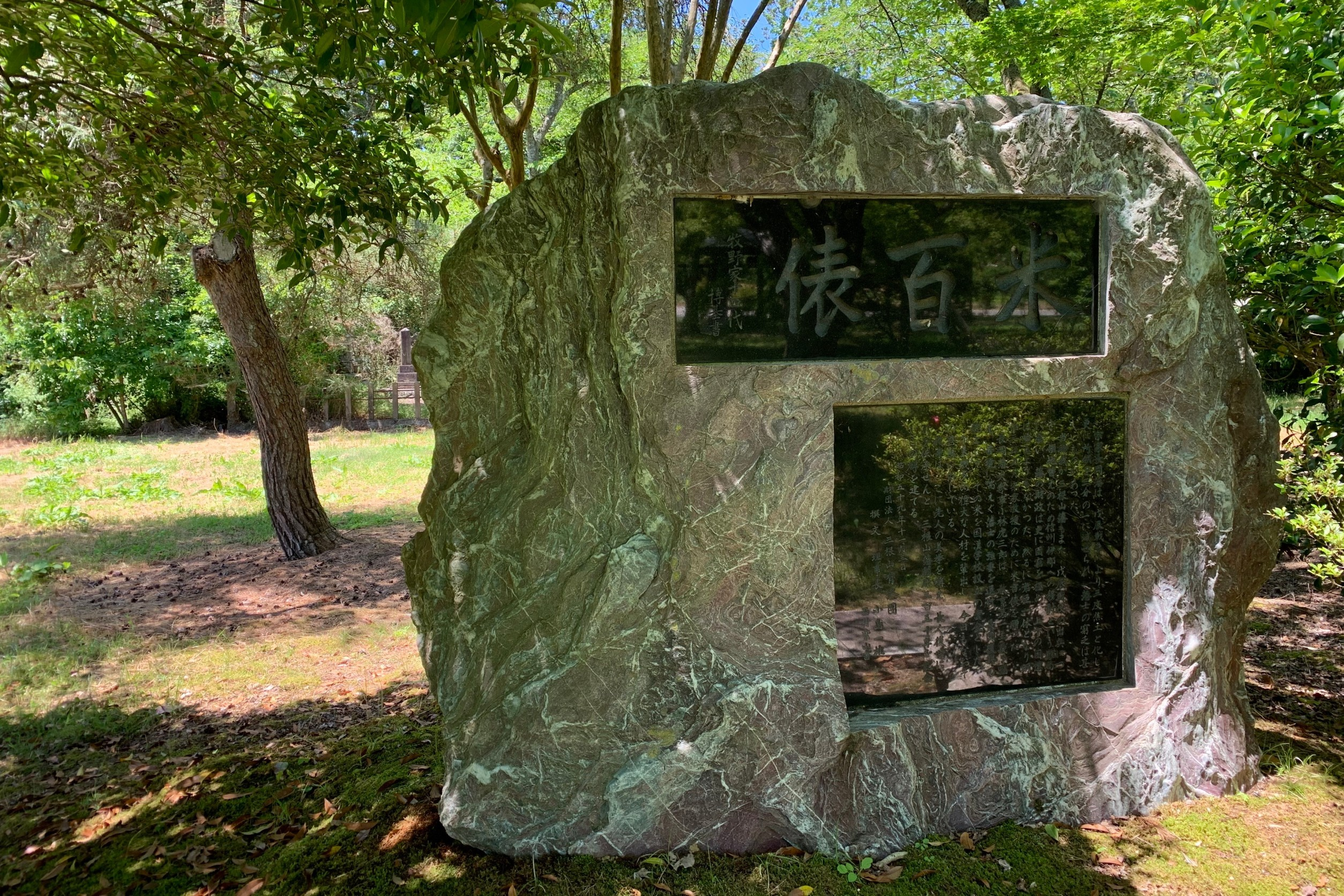
Monument of Kome Hyappyō in Mineyama Domain Ruins Park.

== See also ==
- Kome Hyappyō
