= Kobayashi Torasaburō =

Japanese samurai

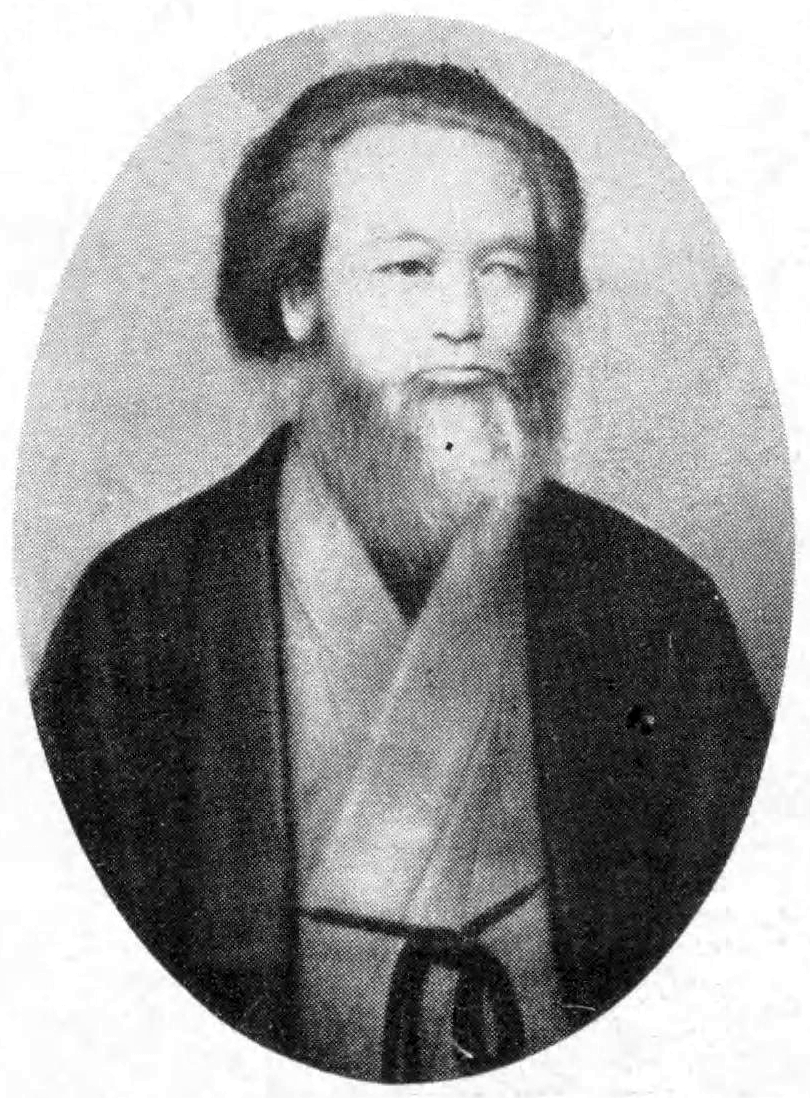
Kobayashi Torasaburō

Kobayashi Torasaburō (小林 虎三郎; September 26, 1828 – August 24, 1877) was a Japanese samurai of the late Edo period, who served the Makino clan of Nagaoka. He studied under Sakuma Shōzan.

Kobayashi was a senior leader of Nagaoka after the Boshin War of 1868–69, and was the instrumental figure in the Kome Hyappyo incident.
