= Tanabe Castle (Tango) =

Japanese castle

Coordinates: 35°26′44.81″N 135°19′51.51″E

- 宮津城
- Miyazu, Kyoto Prefecture, Japan
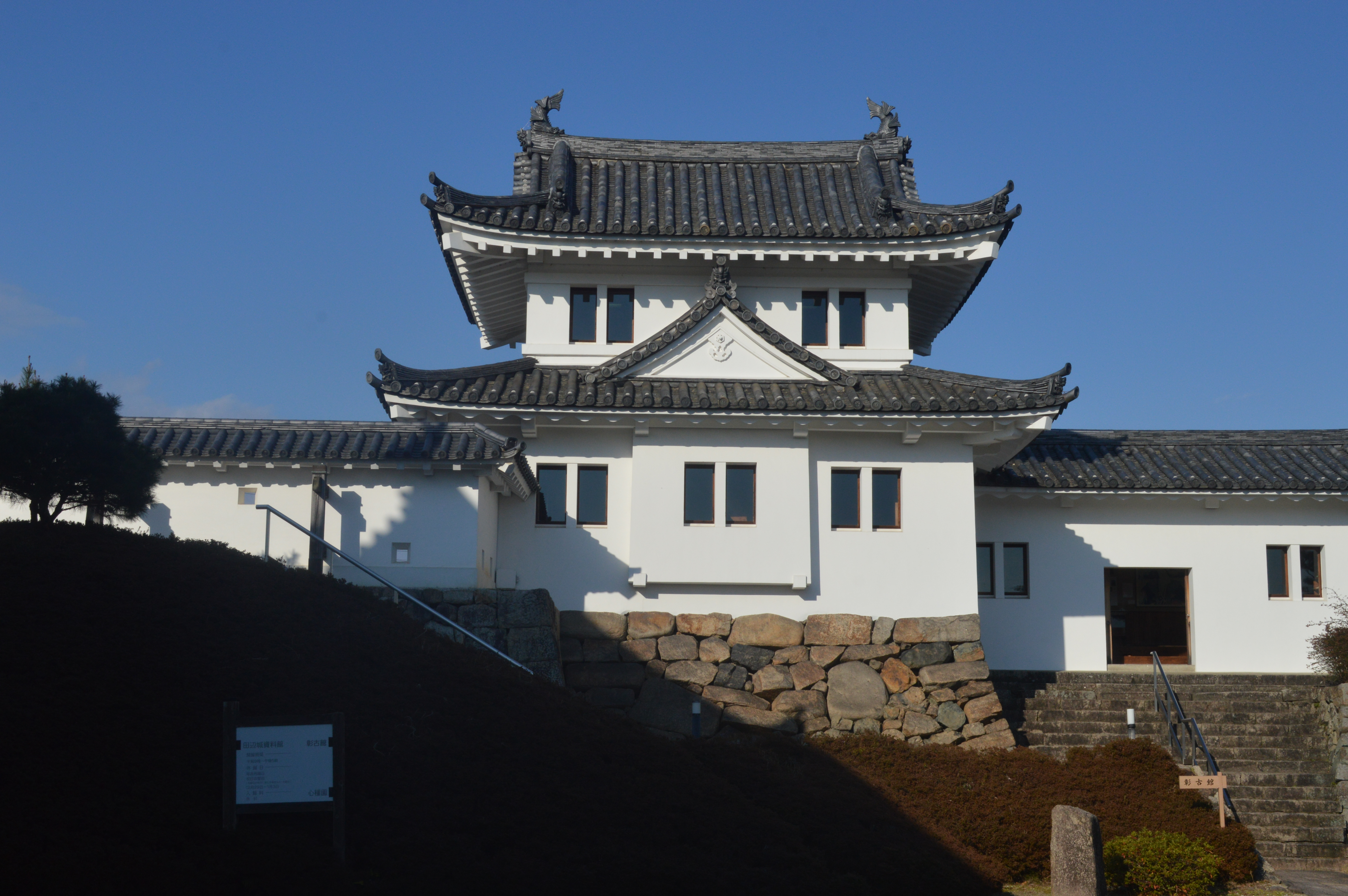
- Faux Yagura at Tanabe Castle

Site information
- Type: flatland-style Japanese castle
- Open to the public: yes
- Condition: ruins

Location

Site history
- Built: c1580
- In use: Sengoku - Edo period
- Demolished: 1871

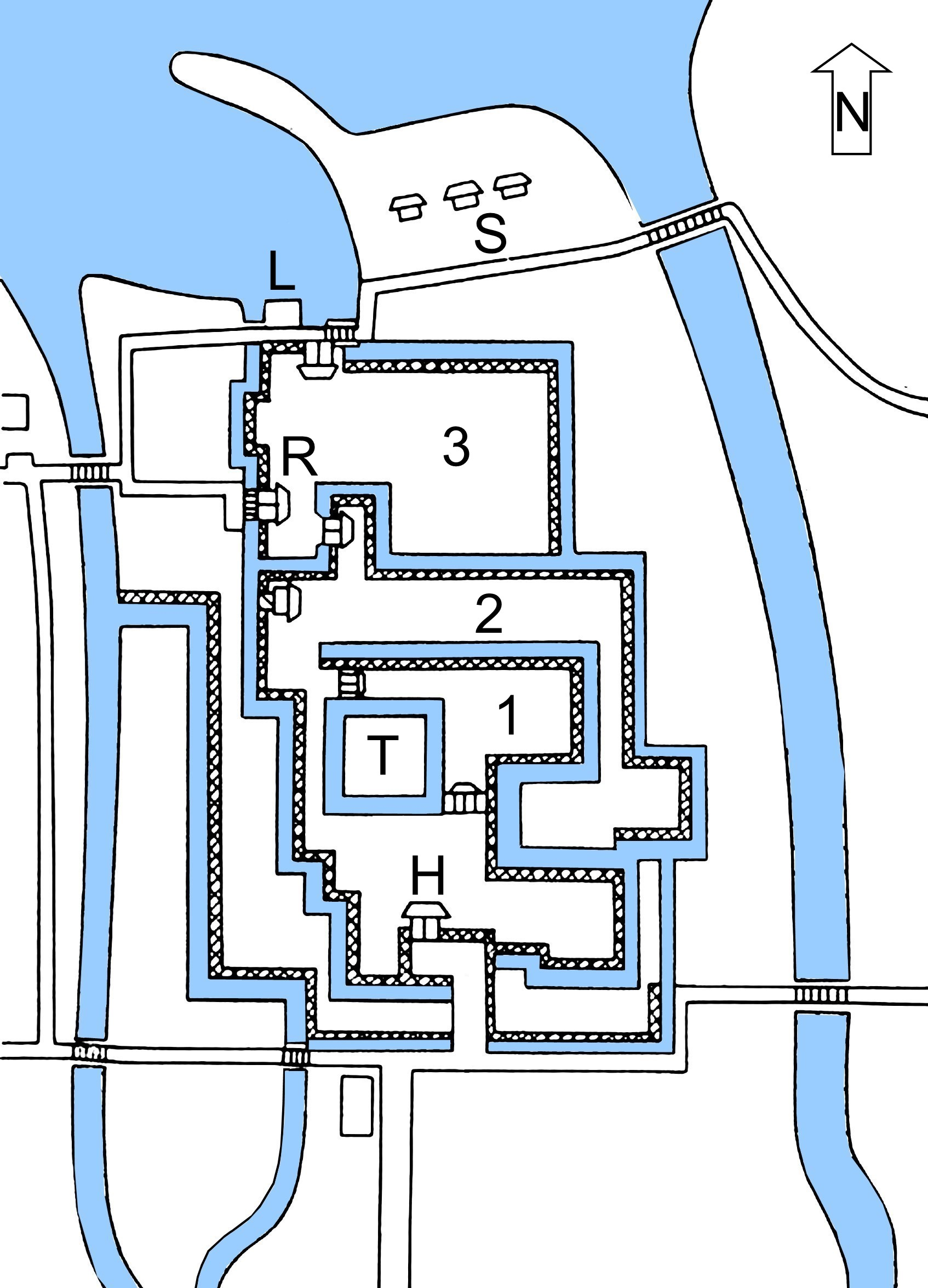
Layout of Tanabe Castle

Tanabe Castle (田辺城, Tanabe-jō) is a flatland-style Japanese castle located in Maizuru, northern Kyoto Prefecture, Japan. At the end of the Edo period, Tanabe Castle was home to a branch of the Makino, daimyō of Tango-Tanabe Domain. The castle was nicknamed Maizuru Castle (舞鶴城, Maizuru-jō), and during the early Meiji period, the city was named "Maizuru" to avoid confusion with the city in southern Kyoto now known as Kyōtanabe.

== History ==
From the Muromachi period, Tango was ruled by the Isshiki clan who served as shugo of the province. Their main administrative office is believed to have been located is now the site of Tanabe Castle, but as the location was hard to defend, their main fortifications were on nearby Mount Takebe. In the Sengoku period, the area came under the control of the Hosokawa clan. Hosokawa Fujitaka (1564–1610) built the first Miyazu Castle at the end of Miyazu Bay in 1580. He then constructed a secondary fortification on the site of the former Isshiki complex at Tanabe, due to its more convenient location on the route to Kyoto. The location, between two rivers, meant there was not much space and so a somewhat unusual spiral layout was used. The castle was protected on the east by the Isatsu River, on the west by the Takano River, and on the north by Maizuru Bay. In the south there was a swamp area in front of the castle, so that it had natural defenses on all sides. After the Honnō-ji Incident, Hosokawa Fujitaka retreated to Tanabe Castle, while his son, Hosokawa Tadaoki remained lord of Miyazu Castle.

During the Battle of Sekigahara, Tadaoki was en route to the Kantō region with his troops in support of Tokugawa Ieyasu while Fujitaka was attacked by forces of the Western Army local to Ishida Mitsunari. Fujitaka set fire to Miyazu Castle and entrenched himself in Tanabe Castle, which, although considerably outnumbered, he successfully defended for two months at the Siege of Tanabe. The Tokugawa shogunate awarded the Hosokawa clan within transfer to Buzen Province, and Kyōgoku Takatomo was placed in charge of the newly-created Miyazu Domain, whose 123,000 kokudaka encompassed the entire province. In 1621, he divided his domain into three parts, with 35,000 koku of his holdings going to his third son, Kyōgoku Takamitsu, and established a cadet branch of the clan based at Tanabe Castle called Tango-Tanabe Domain. Under Kyōgoku Takamitsu, the stone walls were restored, and the castle substantially reconstructed, with a new daimyō residence south of the Ninomaru Bailey, a two-story yagura watchtower north of the Ninomaru Bailey, and five fortified gates. The Kyōgoku were transferred to Toyooka Domain in Tajima Province in 1668 and the castle was given to a cadet branch of the Makino clan, who remained until the Meiji Restoration in 1868. The Makino reconstructed the main gate of the castle, but did not substantially alter its layout or fortifications. Following the Meiji restoration, the castle fell into complete disrepair. All of its moats were filled in, and its remaining structures were demolished. The site became "Maizuru Park", and all that remains today is the stone foundation of the two-story yagura and some fragments of stone walls. In 1940, a faux yagura was reconstructed for use as a museum, and in 1992 a replica of the Main Gate was restored.

The castle site is a four-minute walk from Nishi-Maizuru Station on the JR West Maizuru Line.

== Literature ==
- De Lange, William (2021). An Encyclopedia of Japanese Castles. Groningen: Toyo Press. pp. 600 pages. ISBN 978-9492722300.
- Schmorleitz, Morton S. (1974). Castles in Japan. Tokyo: Charles E. Tuttle Co. pp. 144–145. ISBN 0-8048-1102-4.
- Motoo, Hinago (1986). Japanese Castles. Tokyo: Kodansha. p. 200 pages. ISBN 0-87011-766-1.
- Mitchelhill, Jennifer (2004). Castles of the Samurai: Power and Beauty. Tokyo: Kodansha. p. 112 pages. ISBN 4-7700-2954-3.
- Turnbull, Stephen (2003). Japanese Castles 1540-1640. Osprey Publishing. p. 64 pages. ISBN 1-84176-429-9.
