= Kome Hyappyō =

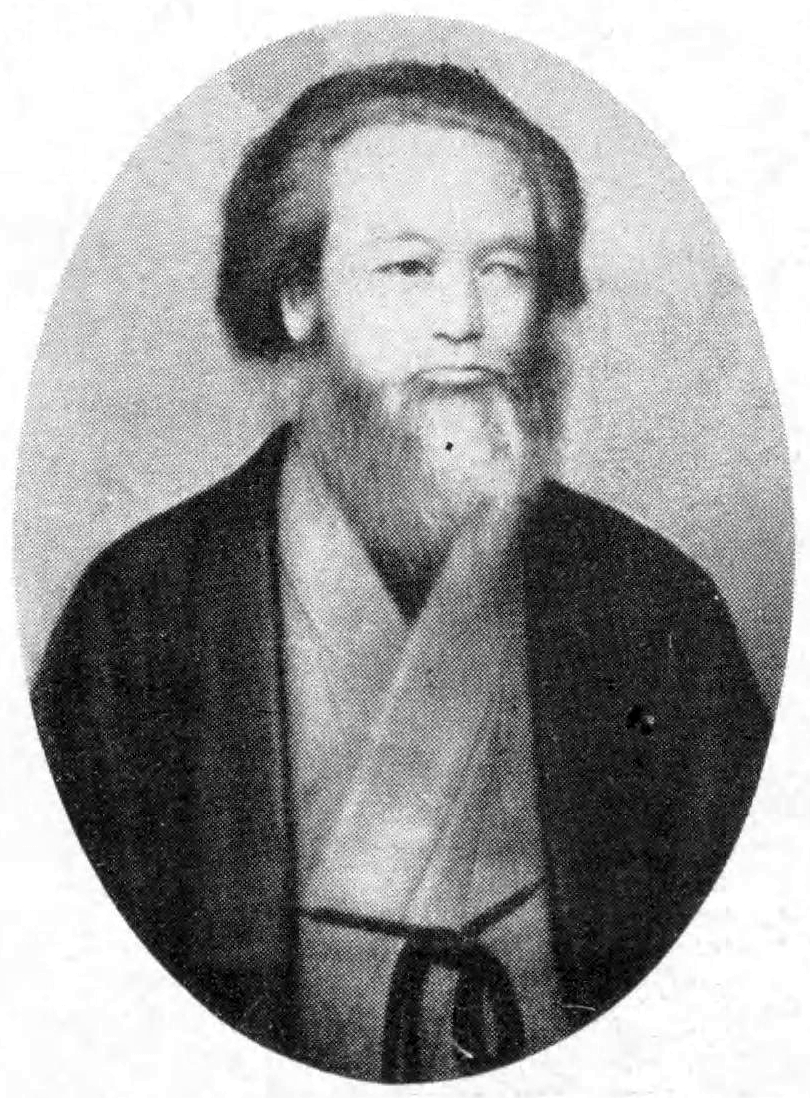
Kobayashi Torasaburō

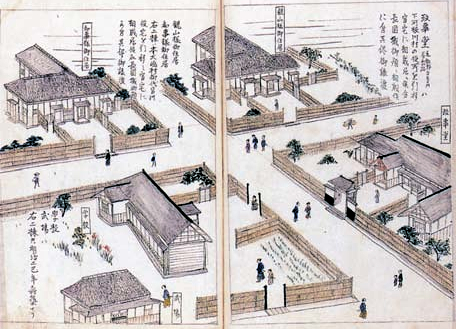
Kokkan Gakko school

Kome Hyappyō (米百俵; literally "One Hundred Bags of Rice" or "One Hundred Sacks of Rice") refers to an event in Japan in which rice sacks were sold to provide education instead of being consumed. This historical anecdote symbolizes the idea that patience and perseverance in the present will lead to profit in the future.

== Story of the hundred rice bags ==
The Nagaoka Domain (now the city of Nagaoka in Niigata Prefecture) suffered great destruction during the Boshin War of the Meiji Restoration in the late 1860s and much of their food-production capability was lost. The neighboring Mineyama Domain (now the town of Maki in Nishikanbara District, Niigata) provided assistance in the form of one hundred sacks of rice. The rice was intended for hunger relief but Kobayashi Torasaburō, one of the chief executives of Nagaoka, proposed a plan to sell the rice and use the money for education instead. Samurai clan leaders and the famished public initially protested the idea, but Kobayashi appealed, saying "If hundred bags of rice are eaten, they are lost instantly, but if they are put towards education, they will become the ten-thousand or one million bags of tomorrow." Kobayashi prevailed and the rice was sold to finance the construction of the Kokkan Gakko school. This is the modern-day elementary school (grades 1–6) Sakanoue, which continues teaching the Kome Hyappyo history and tradition.

== Contemporary use of the term ==
This ideal of enduring pain today for the sake of a better tomorrow, long the guiding spirit for the people of Nagaoka, gained national attention in 2001 when Prime Minister Junichiro Koizumi quoted the story in one of his inaugural speeches.
