= Mineyama Domain (Tango) =

Japanese feudal domain located in Tango Province

Mineyama Domain 峰山藩
- under Tokugawa shogunate Japan
- 1622–1871
- Capital: Mineyama jin'ya
- Area
  - Coordinates: 34°27′31.74″N 135°22′14.81″E
- Government
  - Type: Daimyō
- Historical era: Edo period
  - Established: 1622
  - Disestablished: 1871
- Today part of: part of Kyoto Prefecture

Location of Mineyama jin'ya
Mineyama Domain (Tango) (Japan)

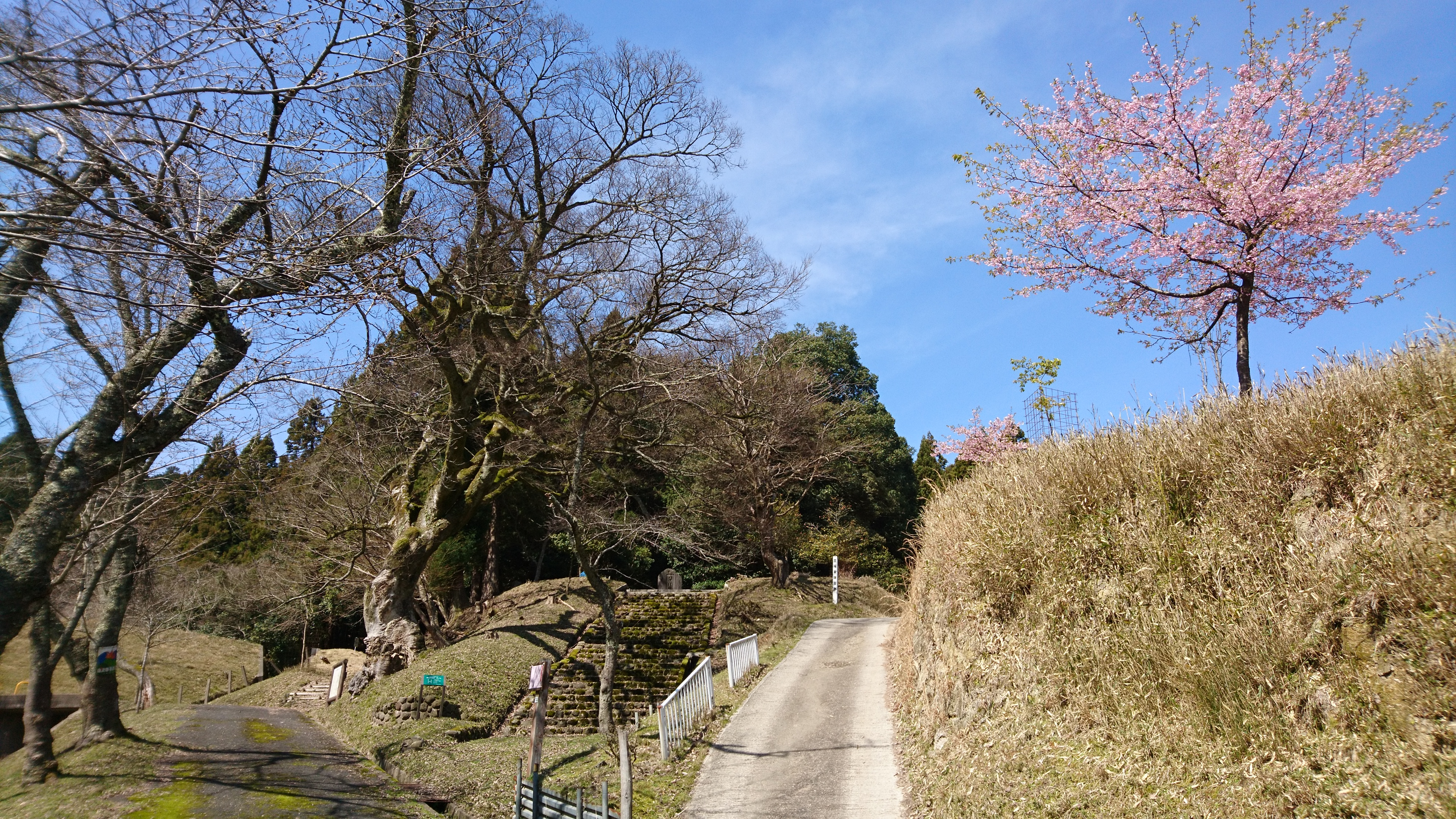
Enoki tree on the site of the Mineyama jin'ya

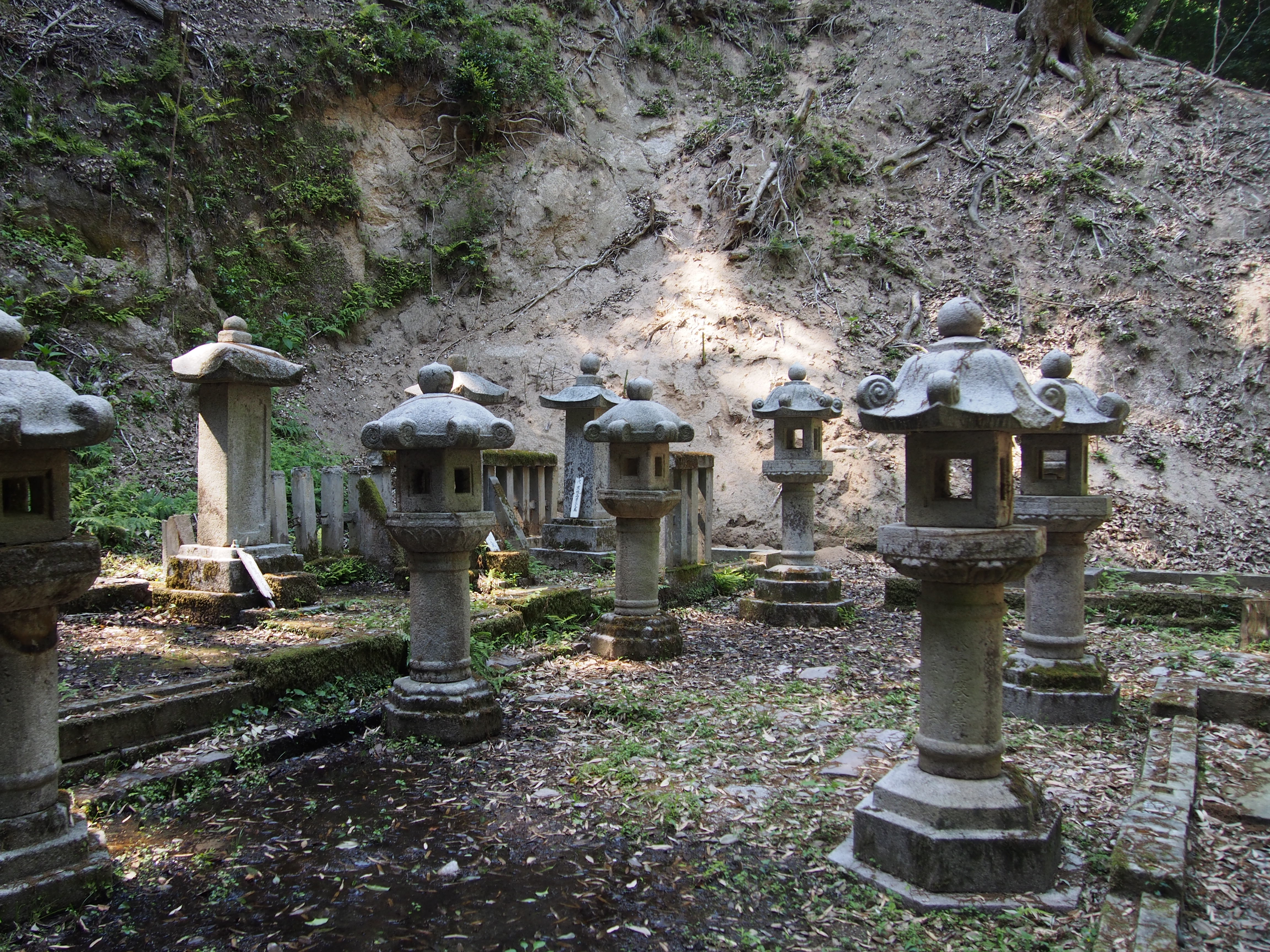
Kyōgoku clan cemetery at Joritsu-ji in Kyōtango

Mineyama Domain (峰山藩, Mineyama-han) was a feudal domain under the Tokugawa shogunate of Edo period Japan, located in Tango Province in what is now the northern portion of modern-day Kyoto Prefecture. It was centered around the Mineyama jin'ya which was located in what is now the city of Kyōtango and was controlled by a cadet branch tozama daimyō Kyōgoku clan throughout all of its history.

== History ==
Following the Battle of Sekigahara, Kyōgoku Takatomo was awarded the entire province of Tango and established Miyazu Domain. His grandson, Kyōgoku Takamichi received a 3000 koku hatamoto holding from Shogun Tokugawa Hidetada in 1616 and inherited the Mineyama region with a kokudaka of 10,000 koku from his grandfather in 1623. Miyazu Domain was abolished by attainder in 1666 and its cadet house at Tango-Tanabe Domain was transferred to Toyooka Domain in 1668, leaving only the minor Mineyama Domain in Kyōgoku hands in the province they once governed.

During the tenure of the 5th daimyō, Kyōgoku Takanaga, the technique of producing a type of crepe cloth known as Tango chirimen was introduced from Nishijin in Kyoto, with the fabric soon becoming a local specialty and major source of income for the domain.

The 6th daimyō, Kyōgoku Takahisa, served as a wakadoshiyori in the Shogunal administration, and was a major supporting character in the novel Onihei Hankachō by Ikenami Shōtarō. The 11th daimyō, Kyōgoku Takatomi also served as a wakadoshiyori, and with his adopted son and final daimyō Kyōgoku Takanobu was an early supporter of the Meiji restoration during the Boshin War. The clan was ennobled with the kazoku peerage title of shishaku (viscount).

On the site of the former jin’ya of the domain is a large enoki tree (Celtis sinensis var.japonica), with a trunk circumference of 4.43 meters and height of 15 meters. The tree is estimated to be 250 to 300 years old, so it was planted around the time the jin’ya was first constructed. This tree is a Kyōtango City Natural Monument

== Holdings at the end of the Edo period ==
As with most domains in the han system, Mineyama Domain consisted of several discontinuous territories calculated to provide the assigned kokudaka, based on periodic cadastral surveys and projected agricultural yields.

- Tango Province
  - 19 villages in Naka District
- Kōzuke Province
  - 2 villages in Yamada District
- Hitachi Province
  - 3 villages in Makabe District
- Shimōsa Province
  - 3 villages in Sashima District
- Ōmi Province
  - 1 village in Gamō District

== List of daimyō ==
#	Name	Tenure	Courtesy title	Court Rank	kokudaka
Kyōgoku clan, 1622-1871 (Tozama)
1	Kyōgoku Takamichi (京極 高通)	1622 - 1666	Shuzen-no-kami (主膳正)	Junior 5th Rank, Lower Grade (従五位下)	13,000 koku
2	Kyōgoku Takatomo (京極 高供)	1666 - 1674	Shuzen-no-kami (主膳正)	Junior 5th Rank, Lower Grade (従五位下)	13,000 koku
3	Kyōgoku Takaaki (京極 高明)	1674 - 1699	Shuzen-no-kami (主膳正)	Junior 5th Rank, Lower Grade (従五位下)	13,000 koku
4	Kyōgoku Takayuki (京極 高之)	1699 - 1723	Shuzen-no-kami (主膳正)	Junior 5th Rank, Lower Grade (従五位下)	13,000 koku
5	Kyōgoku Takanaga (京極 高長)	1723 - 1765	Shuzen-no-kami (主膳正)	Junior 5th Rank, Lower Grade (従五位下)	13,000 koku
6	Kyōgoku Takahisa (京極 高久)	1765 - 1808	Bizen-no-kami (備前守)	Junior 5th Rank, Lower Grade (従五位下)	13,000 koku
7	Kyōgoku Takamasa (京極 高備)	1808 - 1832	Suo-no-kami (周防守)	Junior 5th Rank, Lower Grade (従五位下)	13,000 koku
8	Kyōgoku Takamasu (京極 高倍)	1832 - 1833	Bizen-no-kami (備前守)	Junior 5th Rank, Lower Grade (従五位下)	13,000 koku
9	Kyōgoku Takatsune (京極 高鎮)	1834 - 1834	-none-	-none-	13,000 koku
10	Kyōgoku Takakane (京極 高景)	1834 - 1849	Ukon-no-jogan (右近将監)	Junior 5th Rank, Lower Grade (従五位下)	13,000 koku
11	Kyōgoku Takatomi (京極 高富)	1849 - 1868	Shuzen-no-kami (主膳正)	Junior 5th Rank, Lower Grade (従五位下)	13,000 koku
12	Kyōgoku Takanobu (京極 高陳)	1868 - 1871	Bitchu-no-kami (備中守)	Junior 5th Rank, Lower Grade (従五位下)	13,000 koku

== See also ==
- List of Han
- Abolition of the han system
