= Kyōgoku Takamichi =

Kyōgoku Takamichi (京極 高通; 1603–1665) was a Japanese daimyō of the late Edo period. He ruled the Mineyama Domain in Tango Province.

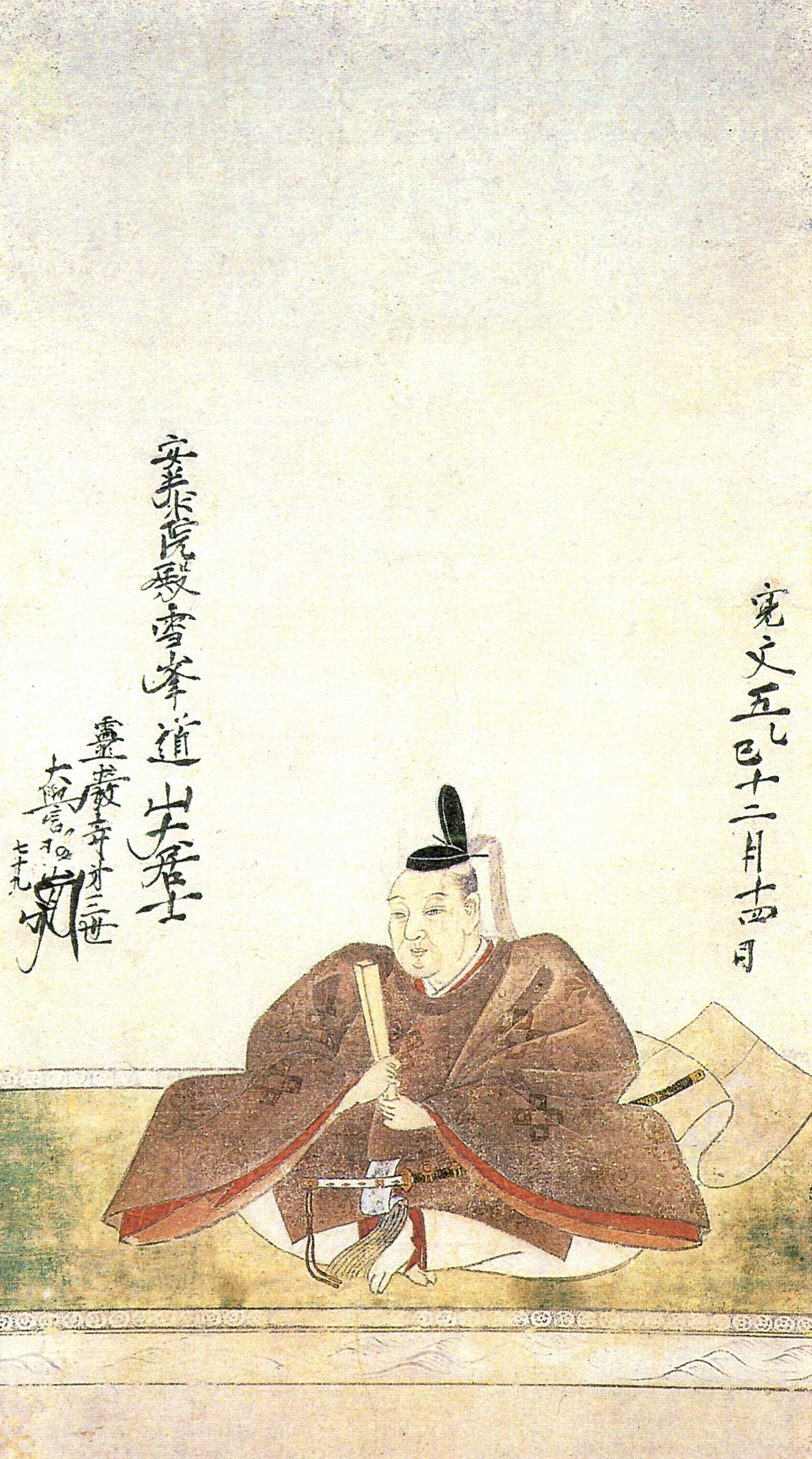
The painting of Kyogoku Takamichi

== Early life ==
He was the son of Kuchiki Tanetsuna.

== See also ==
- Kyōgoku clan

Preceded by ______	Daimyō of Mineyama; 1620–1665	Succeeded by Kyōgoku Takatomo
