= Toyooka Domain =

Japanese feudal domain located in Tajima Province

Toyooka Domain 豊岡藩
- under Tokugawa shogunate Japan
- 1600–1871
- Capital: Toyooka Castle (1600–1653) / Toyooka jin'ya (1668–1871)
- Area
  - Coordinates: 35°32′27.9″N 134°49′18.9″E
- Government
  - Type: Daimyō
- Historical era: Edo period
  - Established: 1600
  - Sugihara clan: 1600
  - Kyōgoku clan: 1668
  - Disestablished: 1871
- Today part of: part of Hyogo Prefecture

Location of Toyooka jin'ya
Toyooka Domain (Japan)

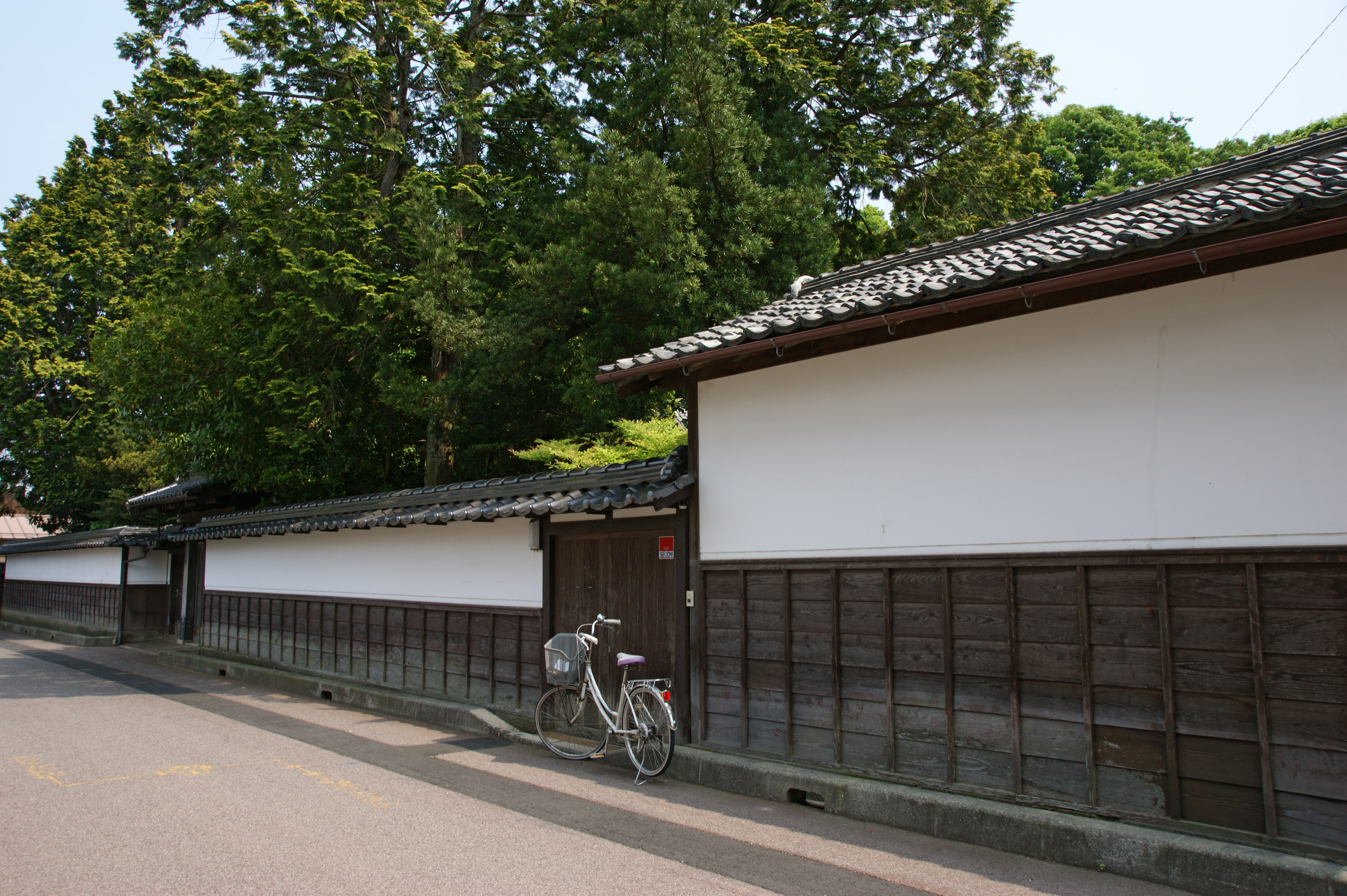
Kyōgoku residence, Toyooka

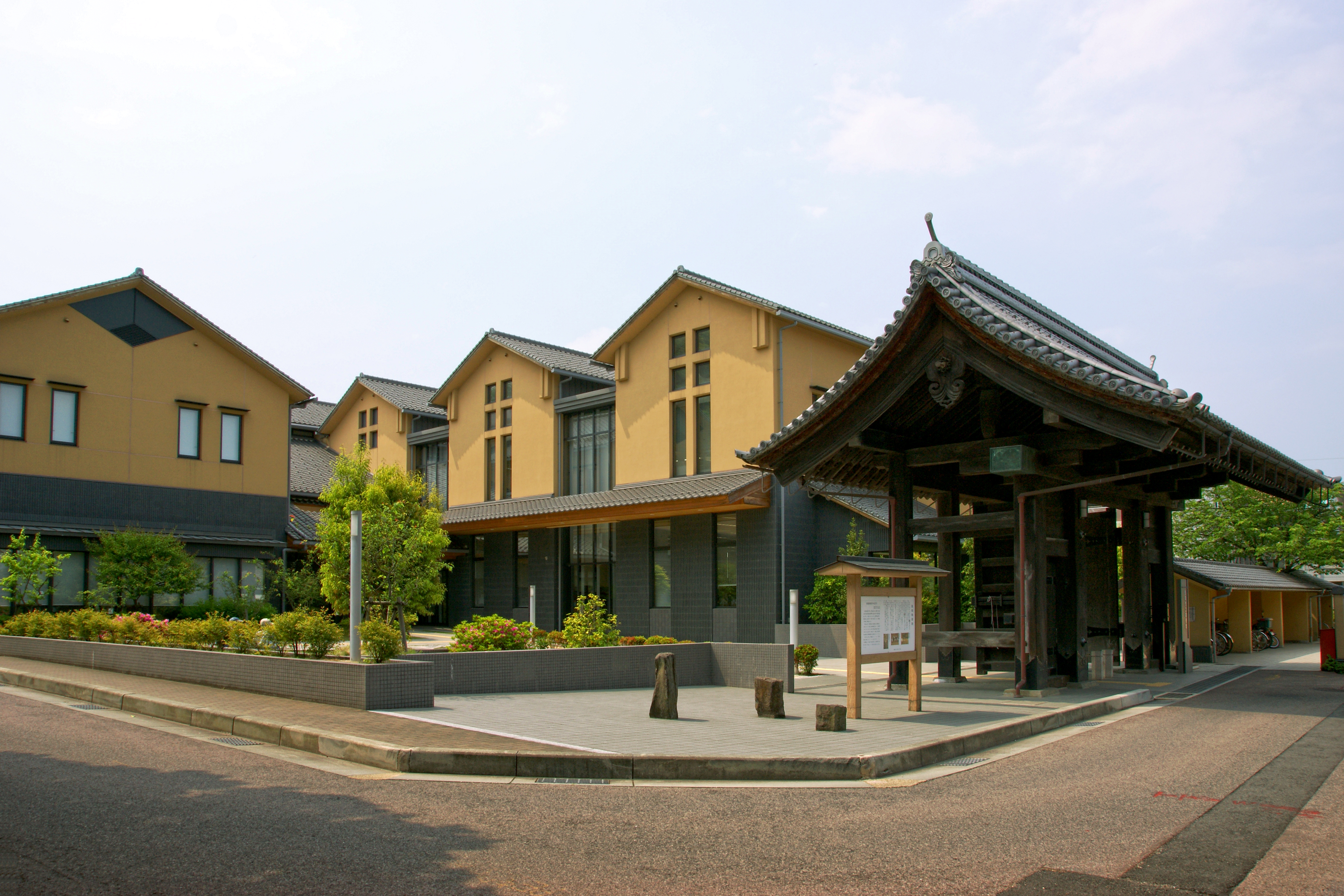
Toyooka City Library, on site if the Toyooka jin'ya

Toyooka Domain (豊岡藩, Toyooka-han) was a feudal domain under the Tokugawa shogunate of Edo period Japan, located in Tajima Province in what is now the northern portion of modern-day Hyōgo Prefecture. It was centered initially around Toyooka Castle, and later at Toyooka jin'ya, which were located in what is now the city of Toyooka, Hyōgo.

== History ==
From the Muromachi period, Tajima Province had been under the control of the Yamana clan. However, in the Sengoku period, the area was conquered by Oda Nobunaga. Following the Battle of Sekigahara, Tokugawa Ieyasu created Toyooka Domain as a fief for Sugihara Nagafusa. Sugihara had fought on the Western (losing) side, but he was married to a daughter of Asano Nagamasa, so he escaped any punishment, but was instead rewarded with a 20,000 koku holding. In 1611, he even managed to expand his holdings to 25,000 koku with additional estates in Hitachi Province. However, in 1644 his son Sugihara Shigenaga died without an heir. A nephew, Sugihara Shigeharu was posthumously adopted, and the Tokugawa shogunate decided to accept this arrangement, albeit by reducing the domain to 10,000 koku. Unfortunately for the Sugihara clan, Sugihara Shigeharu died in 1645 at the age of 17 without an heir, and this time the shogunate abolished the domain through attainder.

In 1668, the shogunate transferred a cadet branch of the Kyōgoku clan from Tango-Tanabe Domain to Toyooka. Kyōgoku Takamori maintained the same kokudaka of 35,000 koku; however, the transfer was in effect a demotion, as previous he had held Tanabe Castle, whereas in his new holding he was not permitted to reoccupy Toyooka Castle, but to construct a much smaller jin'ya. Strapped for cash, he even had to borrow 4000 ryō from the shogunate for its construction. In 1726, the fourth daimyō, Kyōgoku Takanori died at the age of ten, and the domain was in danger of attainder. His six year old younger brother, Kyōgoku Takanaga was appointed daimyō, but the shogunate reduced the domain to 15,000 koku. This created severe financial hardship, and the domain was forced to fire many of its retainers and to reduce the stipends of its remaining samurai. In 1727, the domain's Edo residence burned down. Takanaga appointed Kuramochi Sazen to rebuild the domain's financial affairs; however, these reforms enraged the most conservative retainers, including the karō [Ishizuka Tsuneyoshi, who left the domain in protest. This feud between the reformers and the conservatives were persist for the next several generations. The 7thdaimyō, Kyōgoku Takaari constructed a trading hall to regulate commerce of many products which had been proclaimed domain monopolies. It was burned down two years later by enraged merchants supported by the conservative faction in 1823. In 1833, the 8th daimyō, Kyōgoku Takayuki constructed a han school. During the Bakumatsu period, the 9th daimyō, Kyōgoku Takamatsu was ordered by the shogunate to construct an artillery battery for coastal defense in 1862. The domain sat out the Boshin War without incident. In 1871, with the abolition of the han system, Toyooka Domain became "Toyooka Prefecture". and subsequently became part of Hyogo Prefecture. The Kyōgoku clan was later ennobled with the kazoku peerage title of shishaku (viscount).

== Holdings at the end of the Edo period ==
Unlike most domains in the han system, which consisted of several discontinuous territories calculated to provide the assigned kokudaka, based on periodic cadastral surveys and projected agricultural yields, Toyooka Domain was a single unified holding.

- Tajima Province
  - 28 villages in Kinosaki District
  - 28 villages in Futakata District

== List of daimyō ==
#	Name	Tenure	Courtesy title	Court Rank	kokudaka
Sugihara clan, 1600-1653 (Tozama)
1	Sugihara Nagafusa (杉原長房)	1600 - 1620	Hoki-no-kami (伯耆守)	Junior 5th Rank, Lower Grade (従五位下)	20,000 -> 25,000 koku
2	Sugihara Shigenaga (杉原重長)	1620 - 1644	Hoki-no-kami (伯耆守)	Junior 5th Rank, Lower Grade (従五位下)	25,000 koku
3	Sugihara Shigeharu (杉原重玄)	1645 - 1653	-none-	-none-	25,000 -> 10,000 koku
tenryō 1653-1668
Kyōgoku clan, 1668-1871 (Tozama)
1	Kyōgoku Takamori (京極高盛)	1668 - 1674	Ise-no-kami (伊勢守)	Junior 5th Rank, Lower Grade (従五位下)	35,000 koku
2	Kyōgoku Takazumi (京極高住)	1674 - 1714	Kai-no-kami (甲斐守)	Junior 5th Rank, Lower Grade (従五位下)	35,000 koku
3	Kyōgoku Takayoshi (京極高栄)	1714 - 1721	Kaga-no-kami (加賀守)	Junior 5th Rank, Lower Grade (従五位下)	35,000 koku
4	Kyōgoku Takanori (京極高寛)	1721 - 1726	-none-	-none-	35,000 koku
5	Kyōgoku Takanaga (京極高永)	1726 - 1760	Kai-no-kami (甲斐守)	Junior 5th Rank, Lower Grade (従五位下)	35,000 -> 20,000 koku
6	Kyōgoku Takakazu (京極高品)	1760 - 1791	Kai-no-kami (甲斐守)	Junior 5th Rank, Lower Grade (従五位下)	20,000 koku
7	Kyōgoku Takaari (京極高有)	1791 - 1831	Hida-no-kami (飛騨守)	Junior 5th Rank, Lower Grade (従五位下)	20,000 koku
8	Kyōgoku Takayuki (京極高行)	1831 - 1847	Kai-no-kami (甲斐守)	Junior 5th Rank, Lower Grade (従五位下)	20,000 koku
9	Kyōgoku Takaatsu (京極高厚)	1847 - 1871	Hida-no-kami (飛騨守)	Junior 5th Rank, Lower Grade (従五位下)	20,000 koku

== See also ==
- List of Han
- Abolition of the han system
