= Isshiki Yoshisada =

Isshiki Yoshisada (一色義定, died September 24, 1582), also known as Gorō, Yoshiari, Michinobu and Yoshitoshi, was a Japanese samurai leader in the Sengoku period. He was the tenth head of the Isshiki clan. He was the son of Isshiki Yoshimichi. His father committed seppuku when Yada castle was attacked by Hosokawa Fujitaka. Yoshisada escaped to Yuminoki castle.
