= Kyōgoku clan =

Japanese clan

Kyōgoku clan 京極氏
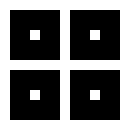
- The emblem (mon) of the Kyōgoku clan
- Home province: Ōmi; Hida; Izumo; Oki
- Parent house: Sasaki clan
- Titles: Various
- Current head: Takaharu Kyōgoku
- Dissolution: still extant

The Kyōgoku clan (京極氏, Kyōgoku-shi) were a Japanese daimyō and samurai clan which rose to prominence during the Sengoku and Edo periods. The clan descend from the Uda Genji through the Sasaki clan. The name derives from the Kyōgoku quarter of Kyoto during the Heian period.

The Kyōgoku acted as shugo (governors) of Ōmi, Hida, Izumo and Oki Provinces in the period before the Ōnin War.

A period of decline in clan fortunes was mitigated with the rise of the Tokugawa clan. Members of the clan were daimyōs of territories on the islands of Kyūshū and Shikoku during the Edo period. Under the Tokugawa shogunate, the Kyōgoku were identified as tozama or outsiders, in contrast with the fudai or insider daimyō clans which were hereditary vassals or allies of the Tokugawa.

At the fall of the Tokugawa shogunate, the Kyōgoku had been enfeoffed at Marugame and Tadotsu in Sanuki, Toyooka in Tajima, and Mineyama Domain in Tango Province. A branch of the Kyōgoku was ranked among the kōke.

== Genealogy ==
The tozama Kyōgoku are descended directly from Emperor Uda (868–897) through his grandson Minamoto no Masanobu (920-993). They represent a cadet branch of the Sasaki clan who were adopted by the Seiwa Genji.

The branches of the tozama Kyōgoku clan include the following:

- The senior branch of this clan are descendants of Kyōgoku Takatsugu (1560–1609). He allied himself with Oda Nobunaga, who arranged for his marriage to his niece, Ohatsu. This marriage to the daughter of Azai Nagamasa made Toyotomi Hideyoshi his brother-in-law. Hideyoshi awarded him Ōtsu Castle (60,000 koku) in Ōmi Province. In 1600, he sided with the Tokugawa at the Siege of Ōtsu; and he received in the same year the fief of Obama (92,000 koku) in Wakasa Province.

Takatsugu's son, Kyōgoku Tadataka (1593–1637), married the fourth daughter of the second Shōgun Tokugawa Hidetada in 1607. Tadataka's revenues were increased gradually over time. In 1634, he was granted Matsue Domain (260,000 koku) in Izumo Province; but he died three years later without leaving any heirs. His holdings reverted to the shogunate.

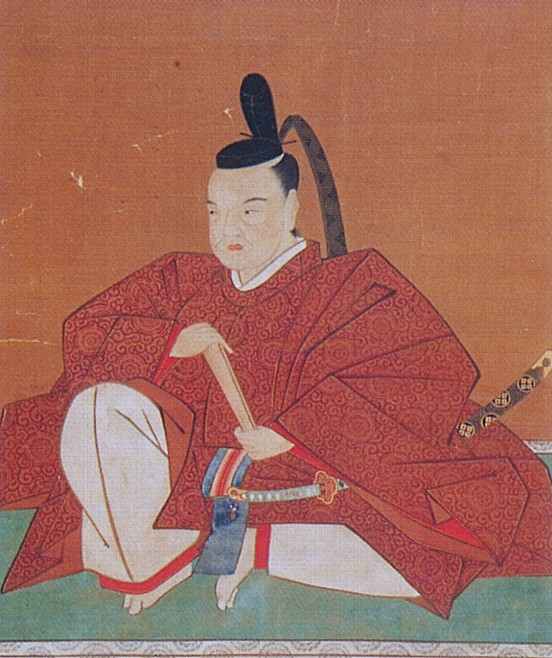
Kyōgoku Takatomo.

The bakufu designated Kyōgoku Takakazu, the son of Tadataka's brother Takamasa, to continue the line. Tadakazu was enfeoffed at Tatsuno (50,000 koku) in Harima Province. In 1658, the family was transferred to Marugame in Sanuki Province, where they remained daimyō until the abolition of the han system in 1871. The head of this clan line was ennobled as a viscount in the Meiji period.

- An offshoot of the senior branch was established in 1694 at Tadotsu (10,000 koku) in Sanuki Province, where they remained through the Meiji Restoration. The head of this clan line was given the title of viscount in the Meiji period.
- A cadet branch was created in 1592 when Hideyoshi awarded Kyōgoku Takatomo (1571–1621) the domain at Iida (80,000 koku) in Shinano Province. Takatomo took sides with the Tokugawa; and he was entrusted with the defense of Gifu Castle at Gifu in Mino Province. After the Battle of Sekigahara, he was transferred to Tanabe Castle (125,000 koku) in Tango Province. Shortly afterwards, Takatomo built a castle at Miyazu (78,000 koku) in Tanba Province; and he established himself there.

Kyōgoku Takahiro (1599–1677) was the adopted son and heir of Takatomo. When the administration of Miyazu became his responsibility after 1621, the revenues of the domain were reduced to 75,000 koku by Tokugawa Shogunate. The poor stewardship of Takahiro was exacerbated by that of his son Kyōgoku Takakuni (1616–1675). Shōgun Tokugawa Ietsuna dispossessed the Kyōgoku of Miyazu in 1666, banishing both Takakuni and his son, Kyōgoku Takayori. In 1687, Takayori was permitted to return from banishment; and he was granted a pension of 2,000 koku and a position amongst the kōke. This Edo period bureaucratic position was responsible for official and imperial rituals and ceremonies.

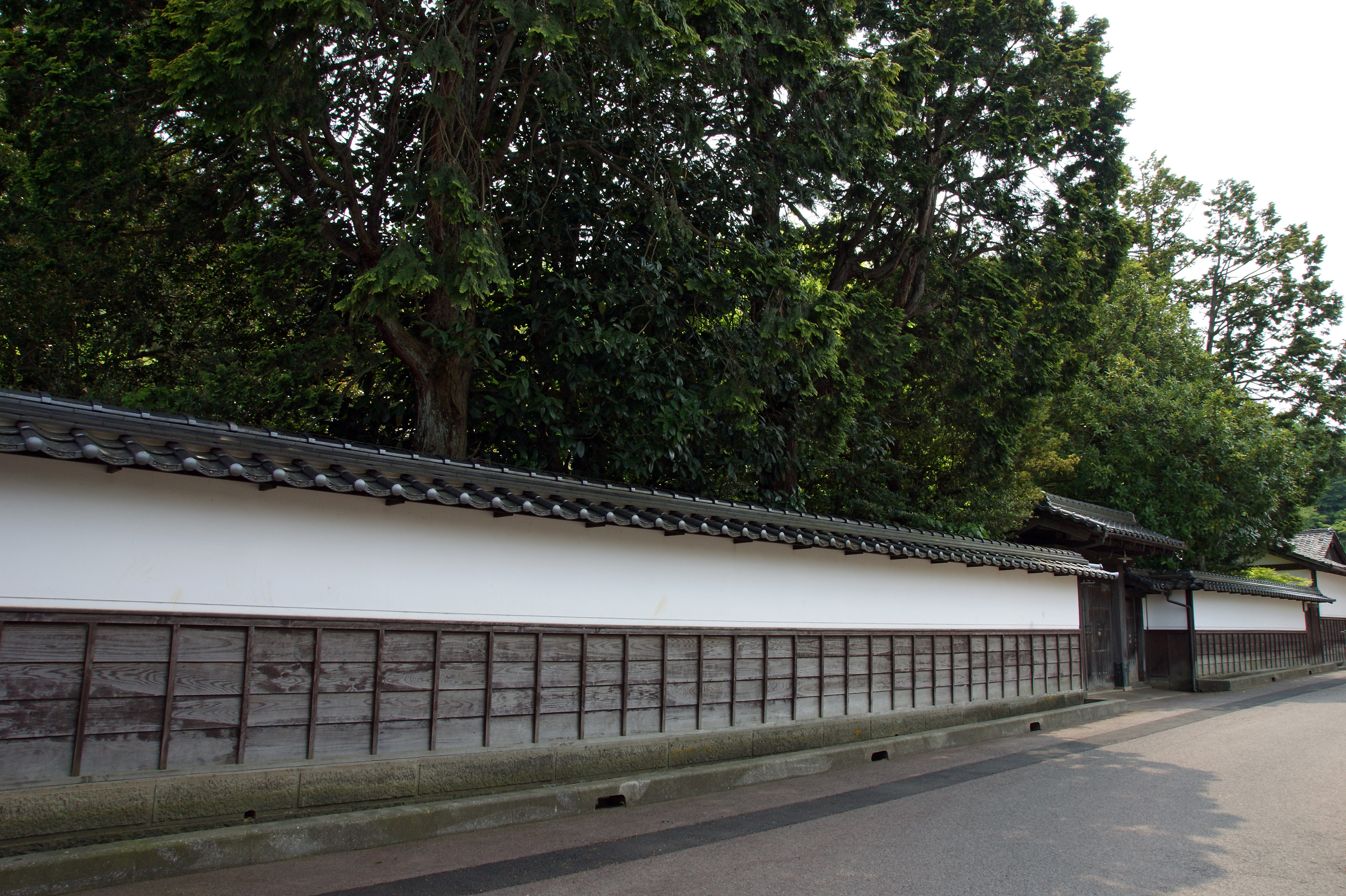
The Kyōgoku residence in Toyooka.

- An offshoot of the cadet branch was created in 1604 when Kyōgoku Takatomo transferred his seat of authority to Miyasu Castle. This clan sub-branching comprised those descendants of the Kyōgoku who continued to hold Tanabe Castle in Tango Province. In 1668, this clan branch was transferred to Toyooka Domain (15,000 koku) in Tajima Province. The head of this clan line was created a viscount in the Meiji period.
- Another offshoot of the cadet branch was established in 1620 when Kyōgoku Takamichi (1603–1665) was enfeoffed at Mineyama Domain (10,000 koku) in Tango Province. Takamichi, who was the son of Kuchiki Tanetsuna, had been adopted by Takatomo. The descendants of Takamichi were daimyōs in this han until 1871. The head of this clan line was recognized as a viscount in the Meiji period.

=== Modern times ===
The fall of the Tokugawa shogunate created ripple of unanticipated consequences amongst the daimyo closely associated with the bafuku. One results of these economic changes was that the residence in Edo belonging to the Kyōgoku daimyo of Tadotsu was sold. The clan's house and garden fell into the hands of Inoue Kaoru, the first foreign minister in the Meiji government. The home became a venue for entertaining foreign dignitaries and introducing them to the esthetics of Japanese gardens.

After World War II, the former Kyōgoku property was acquired by the International House of Japan. A new residence hall and cultural center was built on the site, but the garden was preserved as the unanticipated yet enduring legacy of the Kyōgoku clan. The garden survives and the clan continues, albeit with less public visibly.

== Head Family ==
=== Ancestor ===
1. Emperor Uda
2. Imperial Prince Atsumi (敦実親王) (893–967)
3. Minamoto no Masanobu
4. Minamoto no Sukenori (951–998)
5. Sasaki Nariyori
6. Sasaki no Yoshitsune (1000–1058)
7. Sasaki no Tsunekata
8. Sasaki Tametoshi
9. Sasaki Hideyoshi
10. Sasaki Sadatsuna (1142–1205)
11. Sasaki Nobutsuna (1181–1242)

=== Head Family ===
1. Sasaki Ujinobu (1220–1295)
2. Sasaki Munetsuna (1248–1297)
3. Sasaki Sadamune (1287–1305)
4. Sasaki Takauji
5. Sasaki Takahide (1328–1391)
6. Kyōgoku Takanori (1352–1401)
7. Kyōgoku Takamitsu (1375–1413)
8. Kyōgoku Mochitaka (1401–1439)
9. Kyōgoku Mochikiyo (1407–1470)
10. Kyōgoku Masatsune (1453–1502/1508)
11. Kyōgoku Takakiyo (1460–1538)
12. Kyōgoku Takanobu
13. Kyōgoku Takayoshi
14. Kyōgoku Takatsugu
15. Kyōgoku Tadataka
16. Kyōgoku Takakazu (1619–1662)
17. Kyōgoku Takatoyo (1655–1694)
18. Kyōgoku Takamochi (1692–1724)
19. Kyōgoku Takanori (1718–1763)
20. Kyōgoku Takanaka (1754–1811)
21. Kyōgoku Takaakira (1798–1874)
22. Kyōgoku Akiyuki (1828–1882)
23. Kyōgoku Takanori (1858–1928)
24. Kyōgoku Takaosa (1891–1967)
25. Takaharu Kyōgoku

== Notable clan members ==
Ōishi Riku, wife of Ōishi Kuranosuke, leader of the Forty-seven rōnin, was a daughter of Ishizuka Tsuneyoshi, principal house elder of Toyooka domain. She later returned to Toyooka, and lived with her father at the time of the revenge of the ronin.

In 1925, the first election of the members of the House of Peers representing the Meiji-created nobility ( the kazoku) was held. As a result, Viscount Takanori Kyōgoku of Sanuki was amongst those who were seated in the upper house of the Imperial Diet.

In 2009, Takaharu Kyōgoku became the chief priest (kannushi) of the Yasukuni Shrine. He is the 15th head of the Kyogoku family that held power in Toyooka until the Meiji Restoration.

=== Clan heads ===
- 1. Kyōgoku Takatsugu
- 2. Kyōgoku Tadataka
- 3. Kyōgoku Takakazu 24 April 1619 – 24 October 1662
- 4.
- 5. Kyōgoku Takashige
- 6. Kyōgoku Takanori
- 7. Kyōgoku Takanaga
- 8. Kyōgoku Takakazu
- 9. Kyōgoku Takaari
- 10. Kyōgoku Takayuki
- 11. Kyōgoku Takaatsu
- 12.
- 13. Kyōgoku Takayoshi
- 14. Kyōgoku Takamitsu
- 15. Takaharu Kyōgoku

== See also ==
- Sasaki clan
- Rokkaku clan
- Azai Sukemasa (1491–1542)
- Kyōgoku In (1245–1272), consort of Emperor Kameyama
- Fujiwara no Tamekane (1254–1352), also known as Kyōgoku no Tamekane
- Fujiwara no Morozane (1042–1101), sobriquet Kyōgoku Kampaku
- Kyōgoku, Hokkaidō
