= Isshiki Yoshimichi =

Japanese samurai of the Sengoku period

Isshiki Yoshimichi (一色義道, died 1579) was a Japanese samurai leader in the Sengoku period. He was the ninth head of the Isshiki clan.

He was the son of Isshiki Yoshiyuki. He was the father of Isshiki Yoshisada. He committed seppuku when Yada castle was attacked by the Oda clan force led by Hosokawa Fujitaka.
