= Takatomi Nobunaga =

Japanese composer

Takatomi Nobunaga (Japanese: 信長 貴富 Nobunaga Takatomi) is a Japanese composer, principally of choral music. In 1994 he graduated from the Department of Education in the Faculty of Literature at Sophia University. He taught himself composition. His choral music is currently frequently performed in Japan.

== Major works ==
=== Instrumental ===
- From Nowhere for flute, marimba and vibraphone
- Wind Vane for flute, cello and piano
- String Quartet
- Prelude for piano

=== Choral ===
- Nostalgia for mixed/female/male chorus a cappella (arrangement)
- Songs for a Fresh Heart for mixed/female/male chorus and piano
- Seven Children's Songs for female chorus/equal voices without accompaniment (arrangement)
- Voice for a cappella male chorus
- Cowboy Pop for mixed/male voices a cappella
- Faraway for mixed voices a cappella
- Kan kan kakurembo - Nursery Rhyme of Wakayama for children's or female choir
- Hab' ein Lied auf den Lippen for male voices and piano
- A Tree for female chorus without accompaniment
- Two songs of Corsica Island for female chorus without accompaniment (arrangement)

== References and external links ==
- Takatomi Nobunaga's major works (ja)
