= Tango Province =

Former province of Japan

Map of Japanese provinces (1868) with Tango Province highlighted

Tango Province (丹後国, Tango no Kuni; Japanese pronunciation: [tä́ŋ̀.ɡò̞ (nò̞ kɯ̈̀.ɲ̟ì), -ŋò̞ (nò̞ kɯ̈̀.ɲ̟ì)]) was a province of Japan in the area of northern Kyoto Prefecture. Tango bordered on Tanba to the south, Tajima to the west, and Wakasa to the east. Its abbreviated form name was Tanshū (丹州). It was also referred to as Hokutan (北丹) or Okutan (奥丹). In terms of the Gokishichidō system, Tango was one of the provinces of the San'indō circuit. Under the Engishiki classification system, Tango was ranked as one of the "middle countries" (中国) in terms of importance, and one of the "near countries" (近国) in terms of distance from the capital. The provincial capital was located in what is now the city of Miyazu. The ichinomiya of the province is the Kono Shrine also located in Miyazu. The province had an area of 1,283.43 square kilometres (495.54 sq mi).

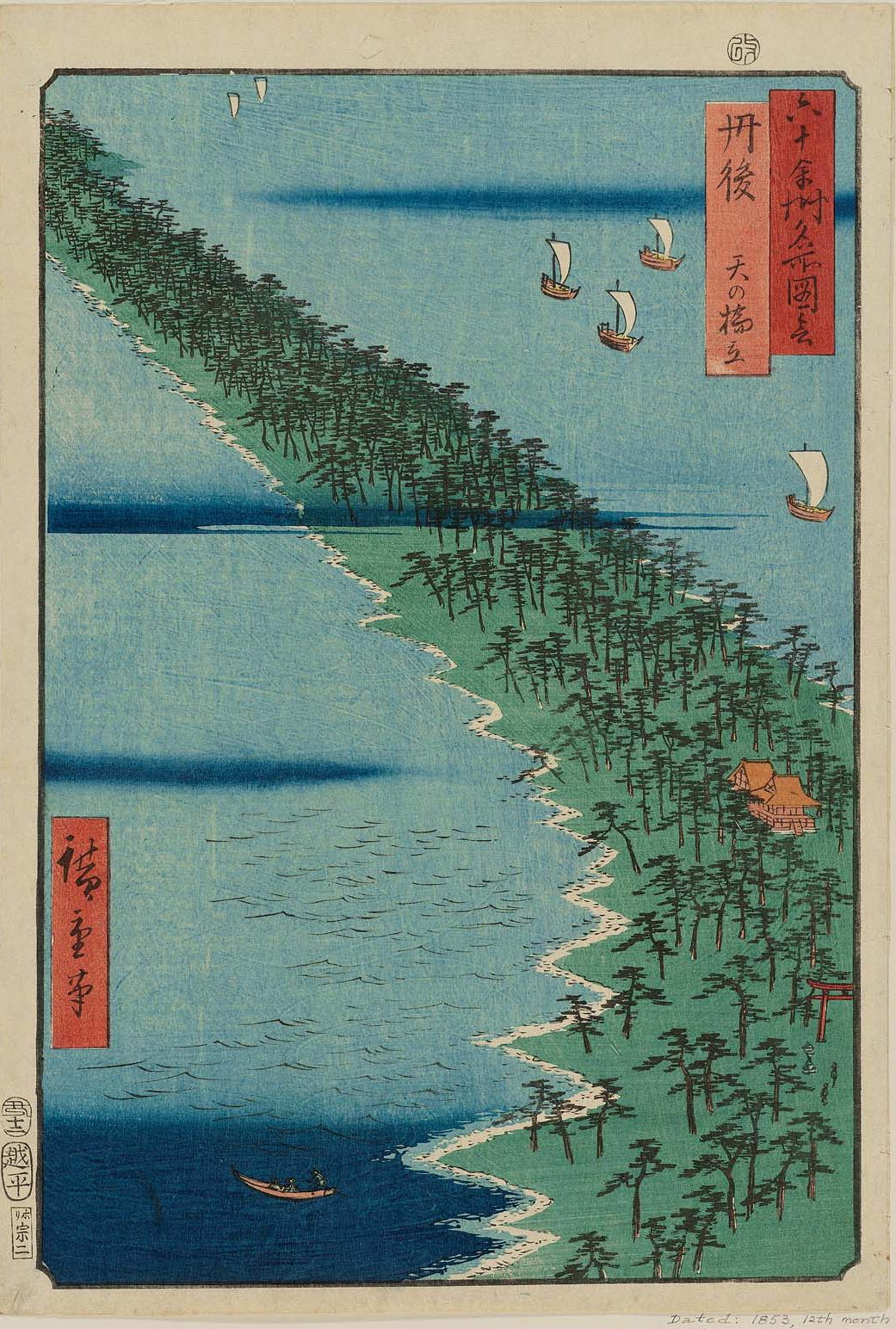
Hiroshige ukiyo-e "Tango" in "The Famous Scenes of the Sixty States" (六十余州名所図会), depicting Ama-no-Hashidate

== History ==
=== Early history ===
The Tango region prospered around the Takeno River basin (present-day Kyōtango city) during the Kofun period, during which time many keyhole-shaped burial mounds were constructed. As coins from the Xin dynasty of northern China have been found in the from the Hakoishihama Site in Kumihama, Kyōtango, it is clear that the area had trade connections with the Asian continent. Also, in the Nihon Shoki, when the Yamato Kingdom sent four generals in four directions to conquer the country, ancient Tanba was the only specific destination mentioned, highlighting its importance to the Yamato rulers as a transportation center towards Asia.

The province of Tango was created in 713 during the reign of Empress Genmei by separating the northern five districts (Kasa District, Yoza District, Tamba District (later Naka District), Takeno District, and Kumano District) of northern Tanba Province. In Wadō 5 (712), Mutsu Province had been severed from Dewa Province. The "Wamyō Ruijushō" lists 35 townships in the area, and states that the area was ruled by the Tanba-no-atai clan, who were the Kuni no miyatsuko. Per the Kujiki, this clan claimed descent from the kami Amenohoakari, who was either the younger brother or son of Ninigi-no-mikoto. The provincial capital was located in Kasa District, possibly in the Fuchū neighborhood of Miyazu, but the precise location is uncertain. The site of the Tango Kokubun-ji (also in Miyazu) is known, and is a National Historic Site. The Engishiki records of 927 list seven major and 58 minor Shinto shrines, with Kono Jinja as the ichinomiya of the province.

During the early Muromachi period, the Yamana clan were shugo of Tango province, but they were supplanted by the Isshiki clan in 1392. The Isshiki ruled until replaced by Hosokawa Fujitaka in 1579, who constructed Tanabe Castle, also known as “Maizuru Castle” under orders of Oda Nobunaga.

=== Edo Period ===
In 1600, the Hosokawa clan was transferred to Kyushu and all of Tango Province was awarded to Kyōgoku Takatomo, who established Miyazu Domain under the Tokugawa shogunate. In 1622, he divided his 123,000 koku holdings, with 35,000 koku going to his third son, Kyōgoku Takamitsu, who established a cadet branch at Tango-Tanabe Domain and 10,000 koku to a grandson, Kyōgoku Takamichi, who established Mineyama Domain. This proved a wise decision, as in 1666 The Kyōgoku clan was dispossessed of Miyazu Domain for bad administration, and reduced to hatamoto status. Miyazu Domain was reduced in size and passed to a number of fudai daimyō clans until 1758 when it came under the control of the Honjō-Matsudaira clan. Tango-Tanabe Domain fared better in that it remained in Kyōgoku hands until 1668, when the clan was transferred to Toyooka Domain in Tajima Province and replaced by a cadet branch of the Makino clan. Mineyama Domain remained with the Kyōgoku until the Meiji restoration. Territory directly controlled by the shogunate was administered by Kumihama daikanshō. During the Edo Period, Tango province was somewhat of a backwater, due to its geographical location. In the mid-Edo period, Mineyama Domain brought in craftsmen from Nishijin to introduce the technique of producing silk crepe cloth, which was named Tango chirimen. This became a regional speciality and a source of income for both Miyazu and Mineyama Domains.

Bakumatsu period domains
Name	Clan	Type	kokudaka
Miyazu	Honjō-Matsudaira clan	Fudai	70,000 koku
Tango-Tanabe	Makino clan	Fudai	35,000 koku
Mineyama	Kyōgoku clan	Tozama	13,000 koku

== Meiji period ==
Following the Meiji restoration, each of the domains (Miyazu, Tango-Tanabe and Mineyama) briefly became prefectures, which were annexed to Toyooka Prefecture in November 1871 and incorporated into Kyoto Prefecture in 1876. Per the early Meiji period Kyudaka kyuryo Torishirabe-chō (旧高旧領取調帳), an official government assessment of the nation's resources, the province had 409 villages with a total kokudaka of 146,724 koku. Tango Province consisted of:

Districts of Tango Province
District	kokudaka	Controlled by	at present	Currently
Kumano (熊野郡)	18,333 koku	Tenryō (52 villages)	dissolved	part of Kyōtango
Naka (中郡)	21,911 koku	Tenryō (9 villages); Mineyama (1 town, 19 villages); Miyazu (5 villages) joint Mineyama/Miyazu (1 village) joint Tenryō/Miyazu (1 village)	dissolved	part of Kyōtango
Takeno (竹野郡)	25,223 koku	Tenryō (47 villages); Miyazu (27 villages) joint Tenryo/Miyazu (1 village)	dissolved	part of Kyōtango
Yosa (与謝郡)	42,175 koku	Tenryō (9 villages); Miyazu (3 towns, 82 villages) joint Tenryō/Miyazu (1 village)		Ine, Yosano, most of Miyazu, part of Kyōtango and Fukuchiyama
Kasa (加佐郡)	39,079 koku	Tenryō (3 villages); Tango-Tanabe (1 town, 134 villages); Miyazu (11 villages) joint Tenryō/Tango-Tanabe (1 village)	dissolved	Maizuru, part of Fukuchiyama, Miyazu

Although the province no longer officially existed after 1871, the name continued to be used for some purposes. For example, Tango is explicitly recognized in treaties in 1894 between Japan and the United States and between Japan and the United Kingdom.

== Gallery ==
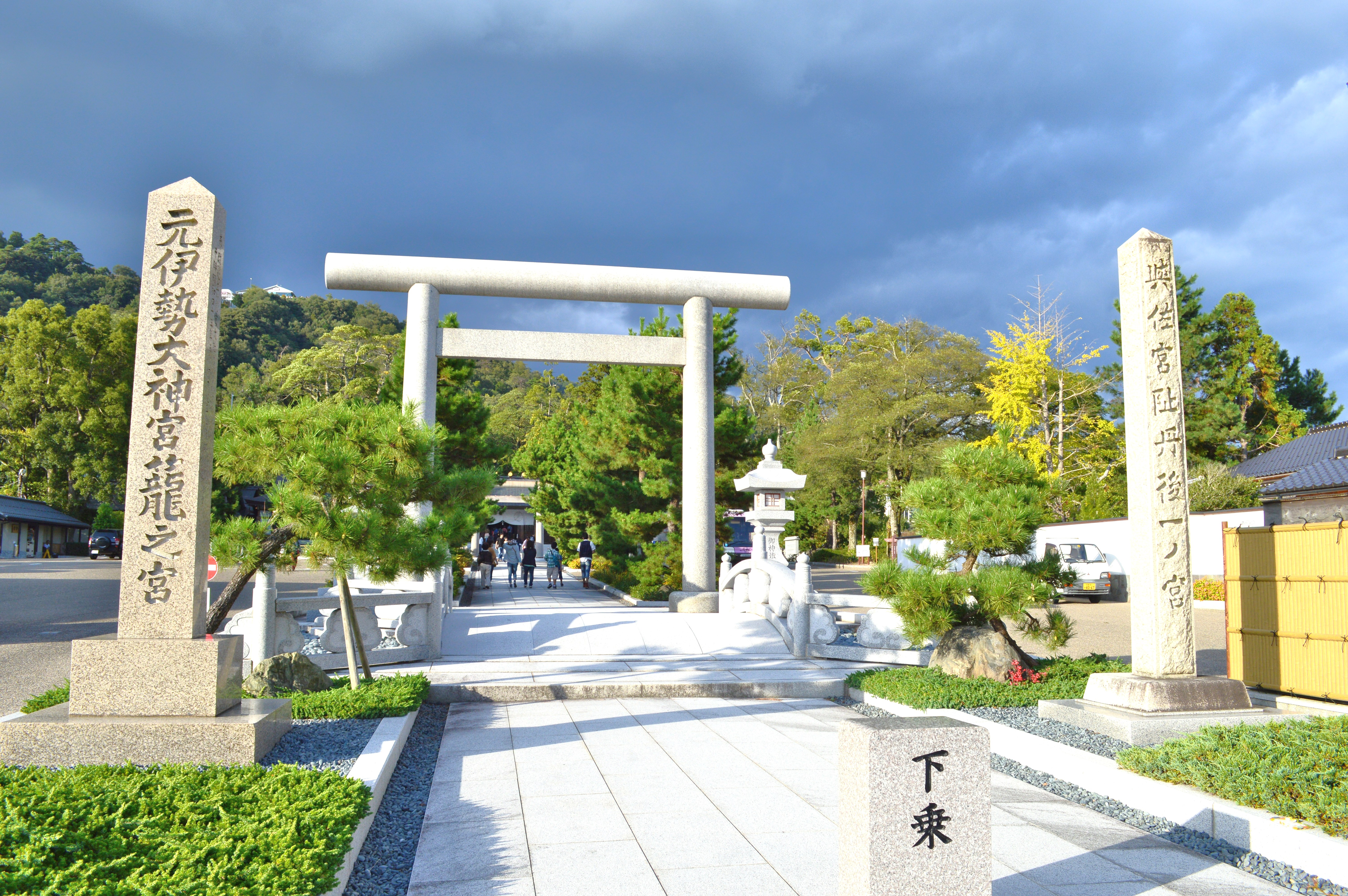
Kono Jinja, ichinomiya of the province

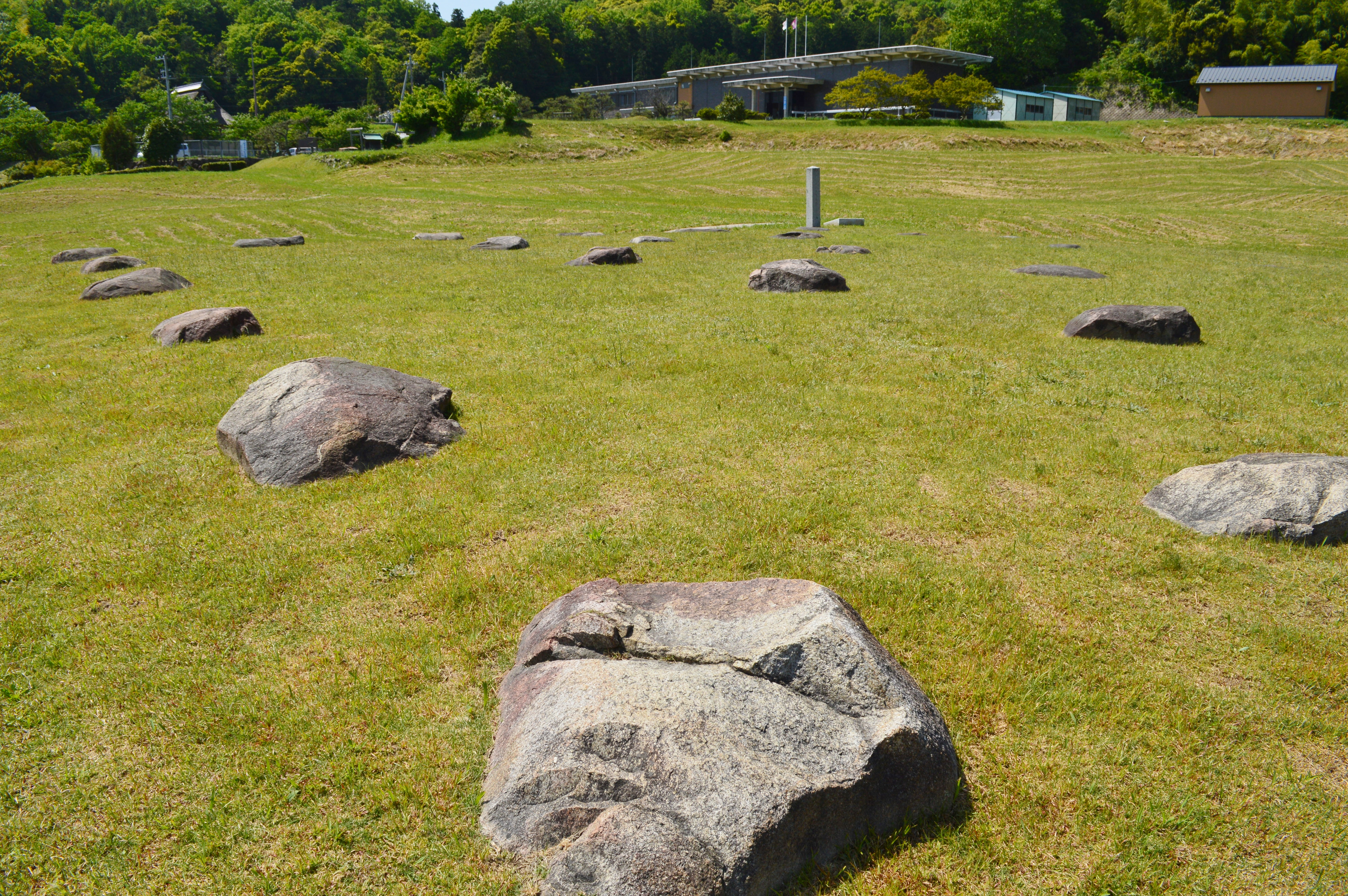
Ruins of Tango Kokubun-ji

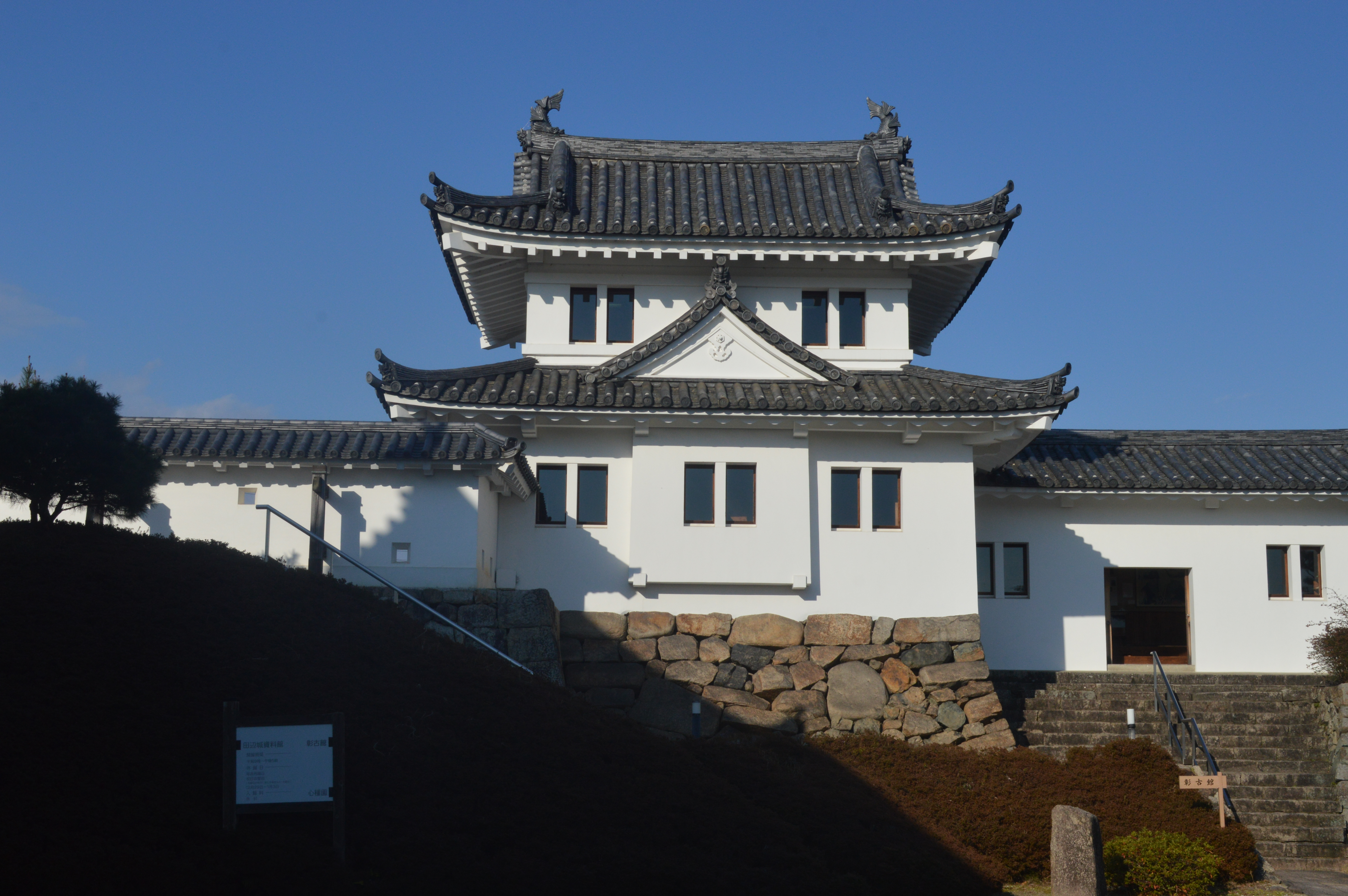
Tanabe Castle, also known as Maizuru Castle

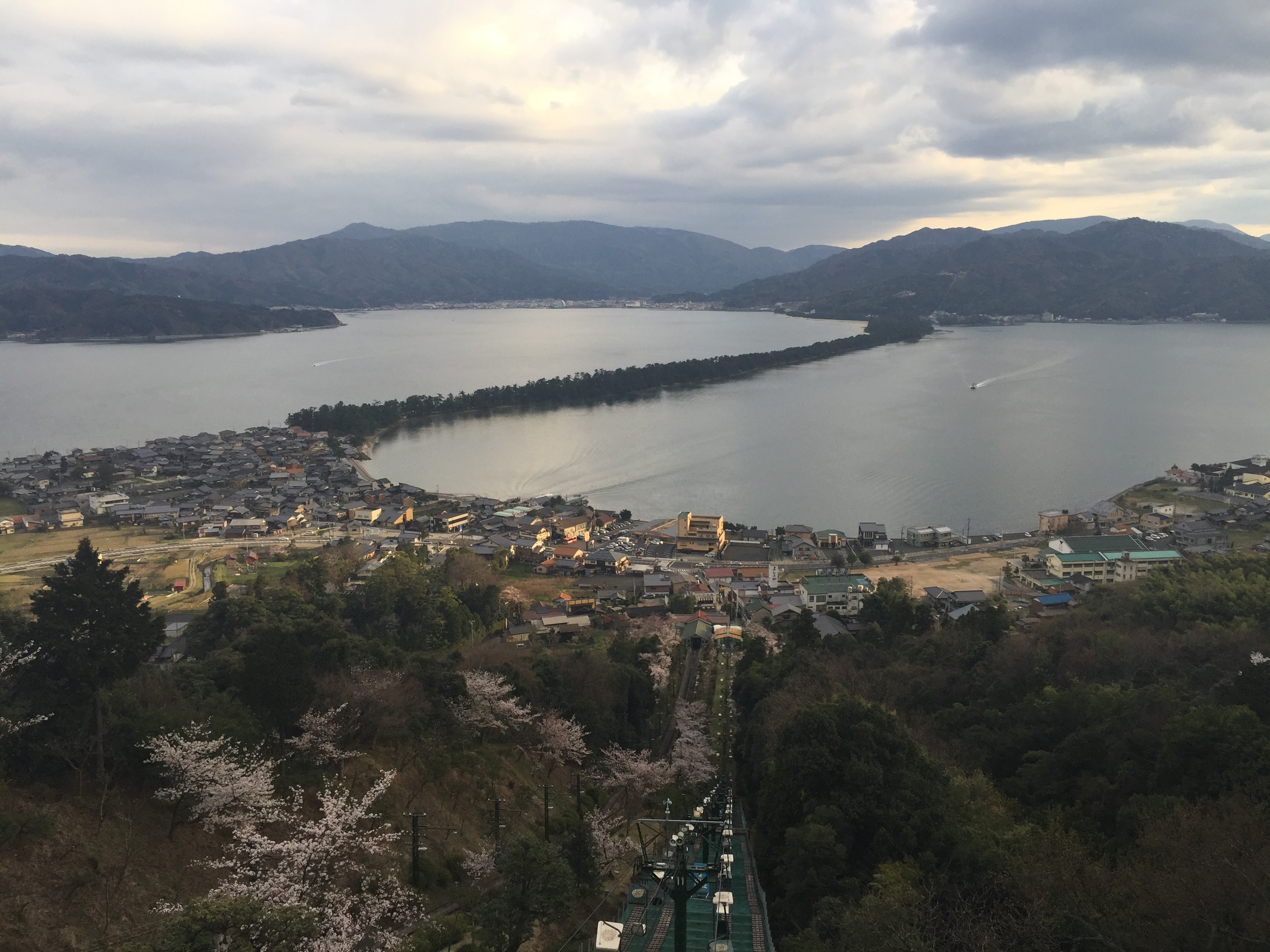
Ama-no-Hashidate
