= Isshiki clan =

Ishiki 一色
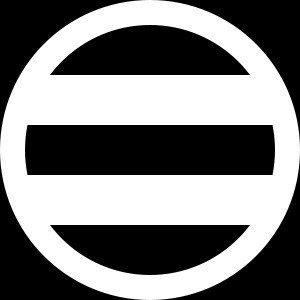
- Hikiryōmon
- Home province: Mikawa; Tango
- Parent house: Ashikaga clan (Seiwa Genji)
- Founder: Ashikaga Kōshin
- Founding year: 13th century

Isshiki clan (一色氏, Isshiki-shi) is a Japanese kin group of the Sengoku period.

== History ==
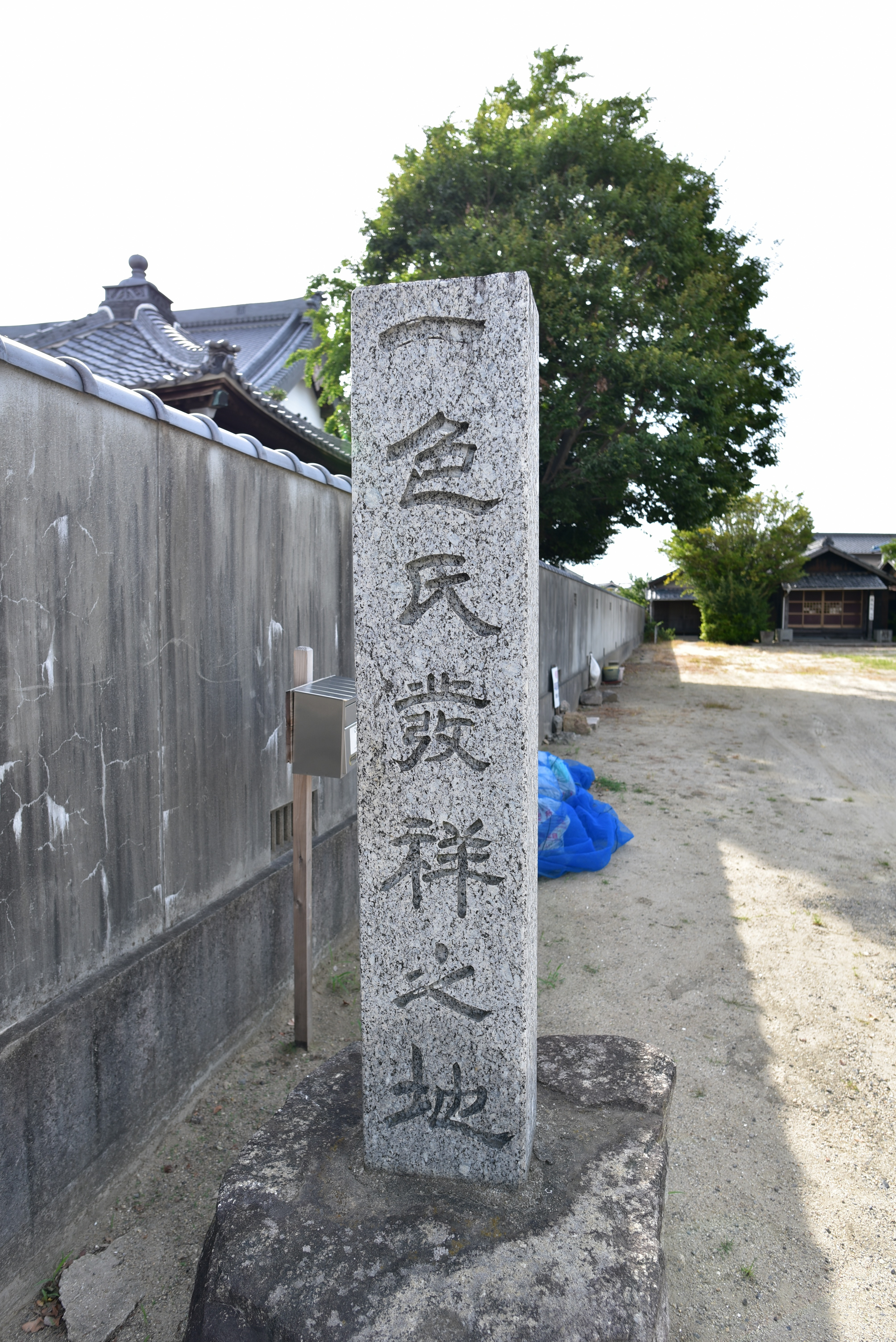
Monument of the birthplace of the Isshiki clan (Nishio, Aichi Prefecture)

The clan claimed descent from the Seiwa-Genji. The clan was founded by Ashikaga Kōshin (died 1330) who is the son of Ashikaga Yasuuji (1216-1270). Near the end of the 13th century, the Isshiki were established as head of Isshiki Domain in Mikawa Province; and the name dates from this time.

The Isshiki held prominent offices in the bureaucracy of the Ashikaga shogunate. The Isshiki were one of four clans with the right to be head (bettō) of the Samurai-dokoro or war department. Later, the Isshiki were military governors of the province of Tango since 1336. In 1575, Oda Nobunaga confirmed their Tango Province. The family lost its domains during the wars of the Sengoku period.

== Heads ==
- Isshiki Kimifuka
- Isshiki Yoshiyori
- Isshiki Yoshimichi
- Isshiki Yoshisada
- Isshiki Noriuji

=== Notable vassals ===
- Inadome Sukehide
- Inadome Sukenao

== Castles ==
- Takebeyama Castle (Yata Castle)
- Yuminoki Castle
