= Matsudaira Munehide =

Japanese daimyō

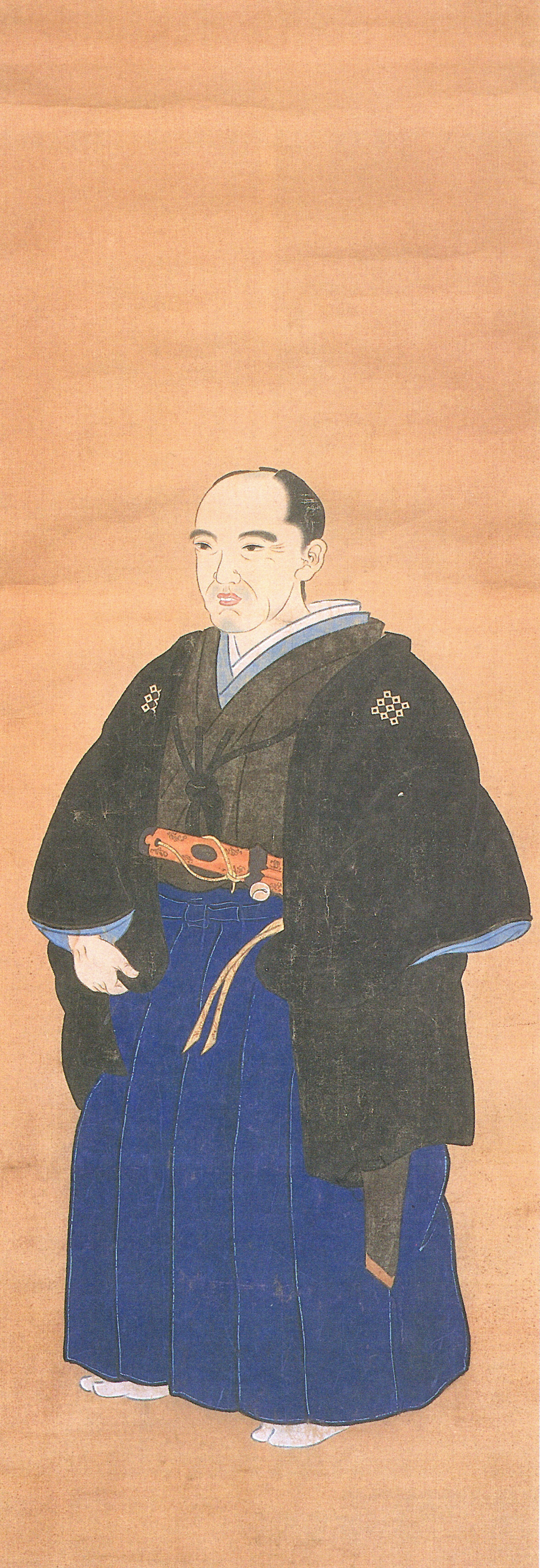
- A portrait of Matsudaira (Honjo) Munehide.

Lord of Miyazu
- In office 1841–1866
- Preceded by: Matsudaira Muneakira
- Succeeded by: Matsudaira Munetake

Personal details
- Born: October 21, 1809
- Died: December 20, 1873 (aged 64)

Matsudaira Munehide (松平 宗秀; October 21, 1809 – December 20, 1873), also known as Honjō Munehide (本庄 宗秀), was a Japanese daimyō of the late Edo period who ruled the Miyazu Domain (modern-day Miyazu, Kyoto). He was known by the titles "Hōki-no-kami" (伯耆守, Hōki-no-kami) (post-1840) or "Tango-no-kami" (丹後守, Tango-no-kami) (post-1868).

== Official in the bakufu ==
Munehide served in a variety of positions in the Tokugawa shogunate, ultimately rising to the position of rōjū in the period from September 1864 through September 1866. Previously, he had been Kyoto shoshidai in the period spanning July 26, 1862, through September 17, 1862. In addition, he served as jisha-bugyō from November 1858 through November 1861; and he was Osaka jōdai from February 1861 through July 1862.

== Restoration official ==
In the Meiji era, he served as chief priest of the Ise Shrine.

Preceded by Matsudaira Muneakira	6th (Matsudaira/Honjō) Lord of Miyazu; 1841-1866	Succeeded by Matsudaira Munetake
Preceded by Sakai Tadaaki	53rd Kyoto Shoshidai; 1862	Succeeded by Makino Tadayuki
