= Tango Kokubun-ji =

Buddhist temple in Japan

Tango Kokubun-ji 丹後国分寺
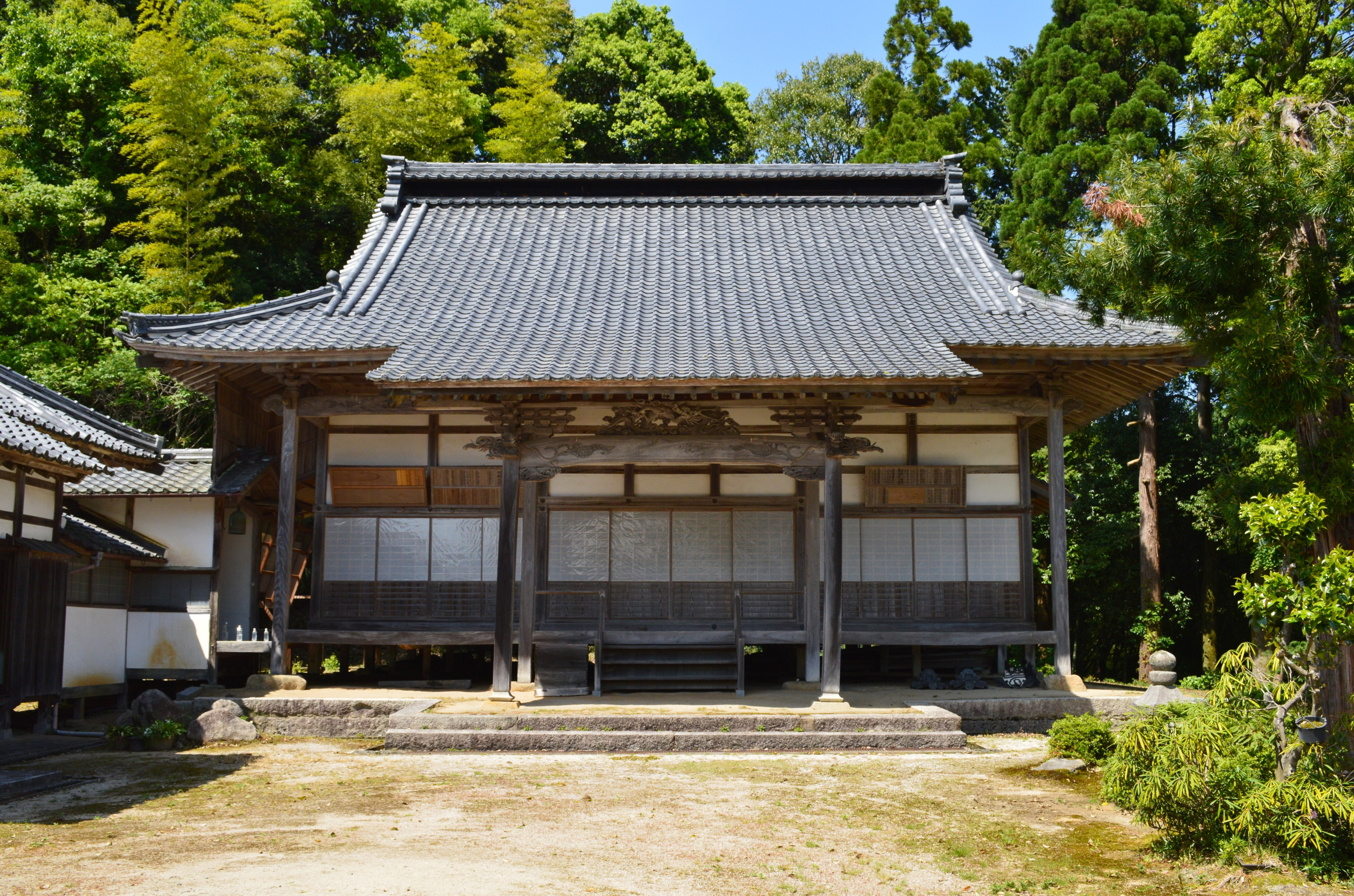
- Tango Kokubun-ji Hondō

- Tango Kokubun-ji Tango Kokubun-ji (Japan)

Religion
- Affiliation: Buddhist
- Deity: Yakushi Nyōrai
- Rite: Kōyasan Shingon-shū

Location
- Location: 59 Kokubun, Miyazu-shi, Kyoto-fu 629-2234
- Country: Japan
- Interactive map of Tango Kokubun-ji 丹後国分寺
- Coordinates: 35°34′48.20″N 135°10′48.20″E

Architecture
- Founder: Emperor Shōmu
- Completed: c.741
- National Historic Site of Japan Important Cultural Property

Tango Kokubun-ji (丹後国分寺) is a Kōyasan Shingon-shū sect Buddhist temple in the Kokubu neighborhood of the city of Miyazu, Kyoto, Japan. It is one of the few surviving provincial temples established by Emperor Shōmu during the Nara period (710–794). Due to this connection, the foundation stones now located to the south of the present day complex were designated as a National Historic Site in 1930. The Tango Kokubunji Temple Reconstruction Engi was designated a National Important Cultural Property in 1992

== History ==
The Shoku Nihongi records that in 741, as the country recovered from a major smallpox epidemic, Emperor Shōmu ordered that a monastery and nunnery be established in every province. These temples were built to a semi-standardized template, and served both to spread Buddhist orthodoxy to the provinces, and to emphasize the power of the Nara period centralized government under the Ritsuryō system.

The Tango Kokubun-ji is located on a hill on the north shore of the Aso Sea, an inland sea separated by Amanohashidate, in the northern part of Kyoto Prefecture. The exact date of the temple's foundation is unknown, as the exact location of the original temple has not been located, and the surviving foundation stones date from the Kamakura period, but work is believed to have started around 741 AD as it is mentioned in historical records from 756 in a list of 26 kokubun-ji in various provinces, and roof tiles from this period have also been found in the vicinity. The vicinity also includes the site of the kokufu of Tango Province, and the Kono Shrine, the ichinomiya of the province, The temple's name appears repeatedly in Heian period records, including the Engishiki of 927 AD. During the Kamakura period, the temple apparently suffered from a calamity during which its gold and bronze main image, a statue of Yakushi Nyōrai was stolen. The temple was reconstructed, and its new pagoda appears in Sesshū Tōyō's early Muromachi period painting of Ama-no-Hashidate. It was destroyed again in 1507 during the invasion of Tango Province by the Takeda clan of Wakasa Province, and once again in 1542. In the early Edo period, the temple was swept away by a flood in 1683, after which it was rebuilt on a much smaller scale on the hill to the north, where it is now located.

The foundation stones of Kondō and Middle Gate from the Kamakura period were aligned north to south, with a Pagoda on the west. Currently, the foundation stones for the Kondō remain in situ, indicating a structure that was five by six bays in size. This corresponds to the building as depicted in the Kamakura period "Tango Kokubunji Revival Engi". Only two cornerstones for the Middle Gate survive, and the building is not depicted in the "Tango Kokubunji Revival Engi"; however, it is shown in the painting by Sesshū. Likewise, the pagoda is not depicted in the Kamakura period "Tango Kokubunji Revival Engi", but is shown by Sesshū as a five-story structure. Currently, sixteen foundation stones remain in situ. It is believed that all of these foundation stones date from the 1334 reconstruction. The state of the temple from the time of a fire in the Sengoku period is unknown, but after being lost in a flood in 1683, the temple was rebuilt on higher ground.

Currently, the area around the ruins of Kokubunji has been maintained as a park and is open to the public. Adjacent to the north side is the Kyoto Prefectural Tango Folk Museum (京都府立丹後郷土資料館, Kyōtofuritsu Tango Kyōdo Shiryōkan), which displays some of the excavated roof tiles and related materials. The temple site is a five minute walk from the "Tango Museum Mae" bus stoops the Tango Kairiku Bus from Iwatakiguchi Station.

== Cultural Properties ==
=== National Important Cultural Properties ===
- "Tango Kokubunji Revival Engi" (丹後国分寺再興縁起), Nanboku-chō period, document recording the history of the reconstruction of Tango Kokubun-ji from 1328 to 1334. It is one of the few historical materials that reveals the circumstances of the construction of local temples in the Middle Ages, and the only historical material that concretely shows the reconstruction activities of kokubunji in the western part of Japan from the late Kamakura period to the Nanboku-chō period. The document was designated as a Kyoto Prefecture Tangible Cultural Property in 1990 and re-designated as a national Important Cultural Property in 1992.

== Gallery ==
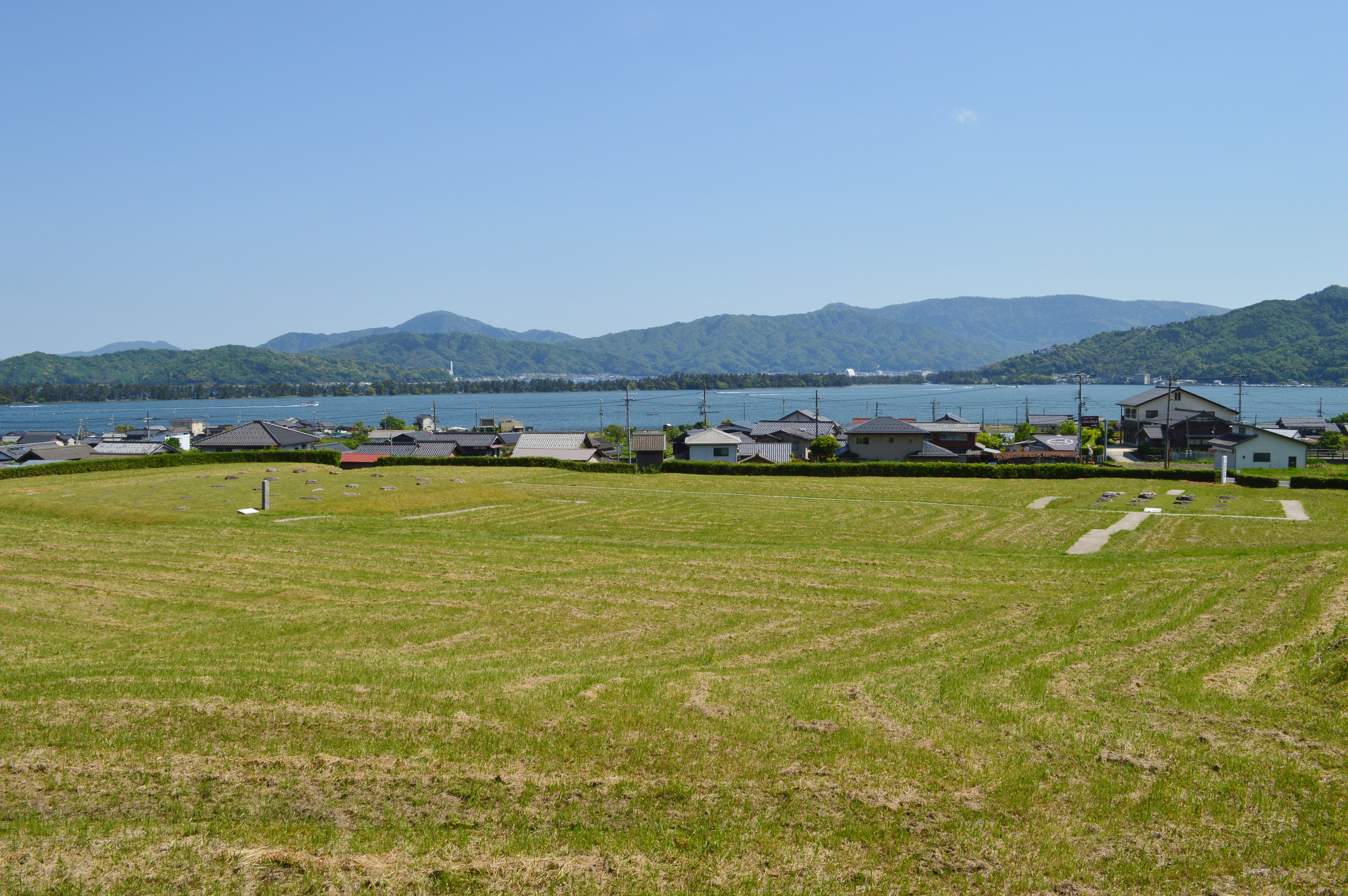

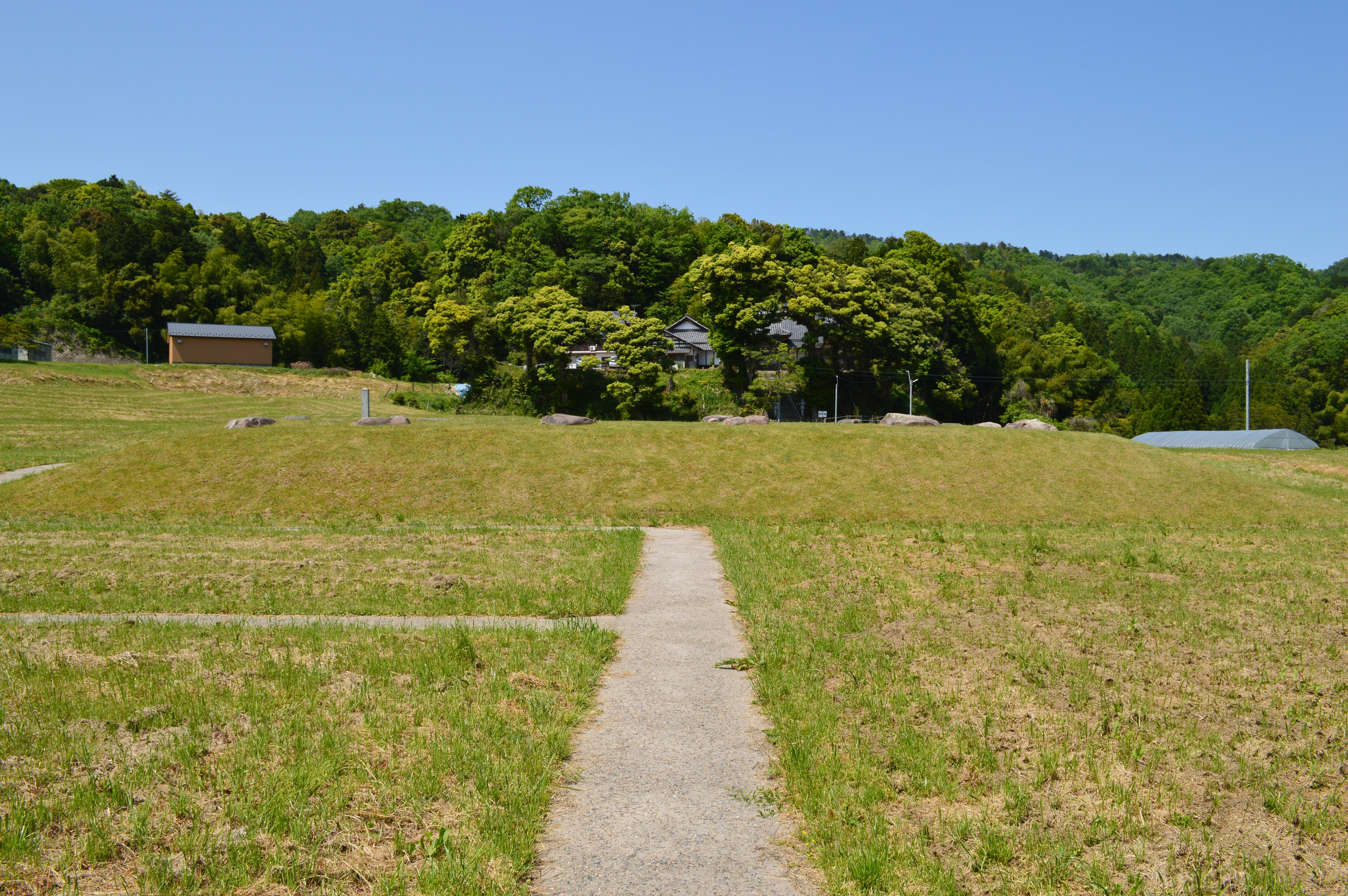
Site of the Kondō
current temple in back

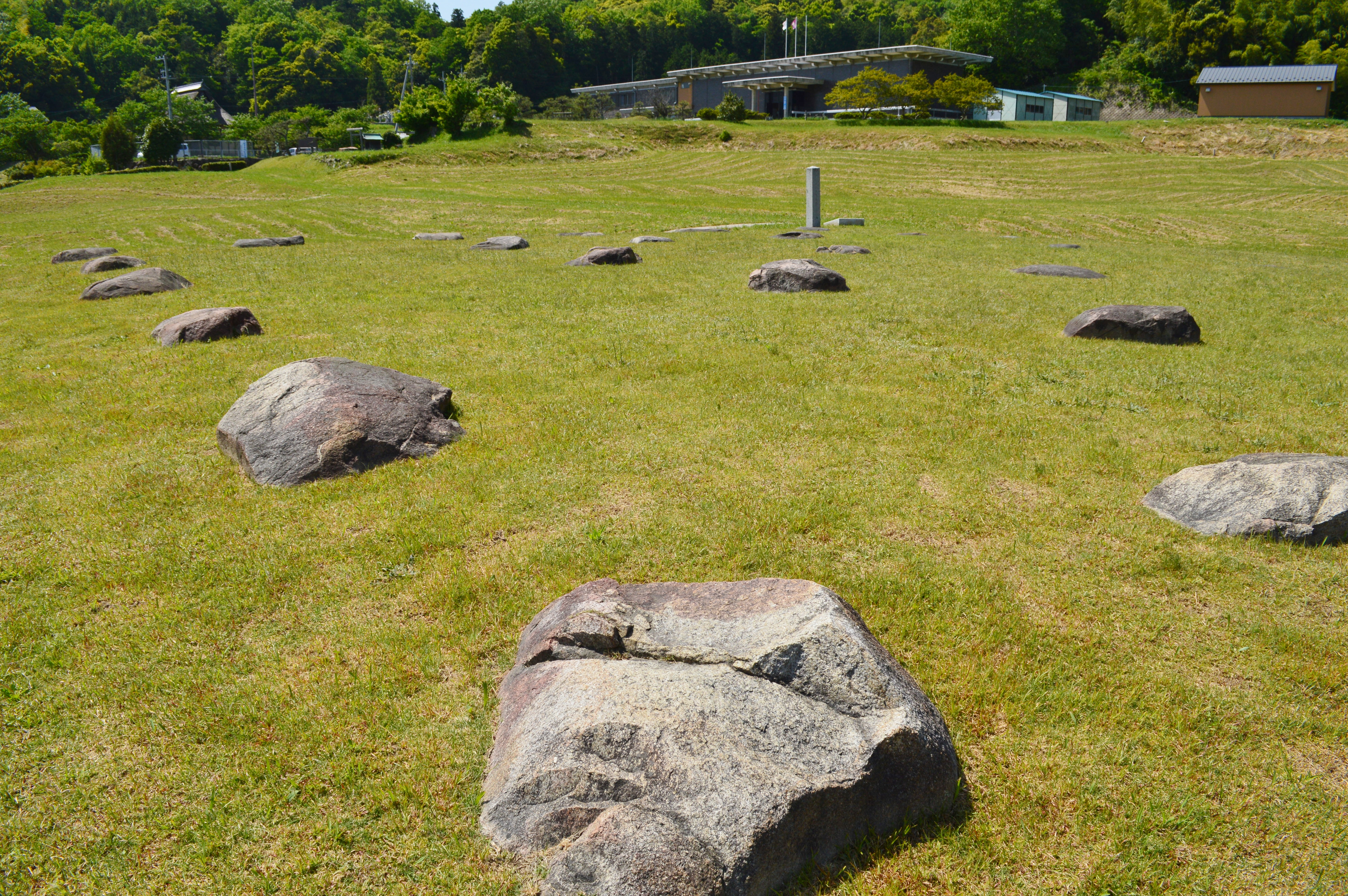
Foundation Stones of the Kondō

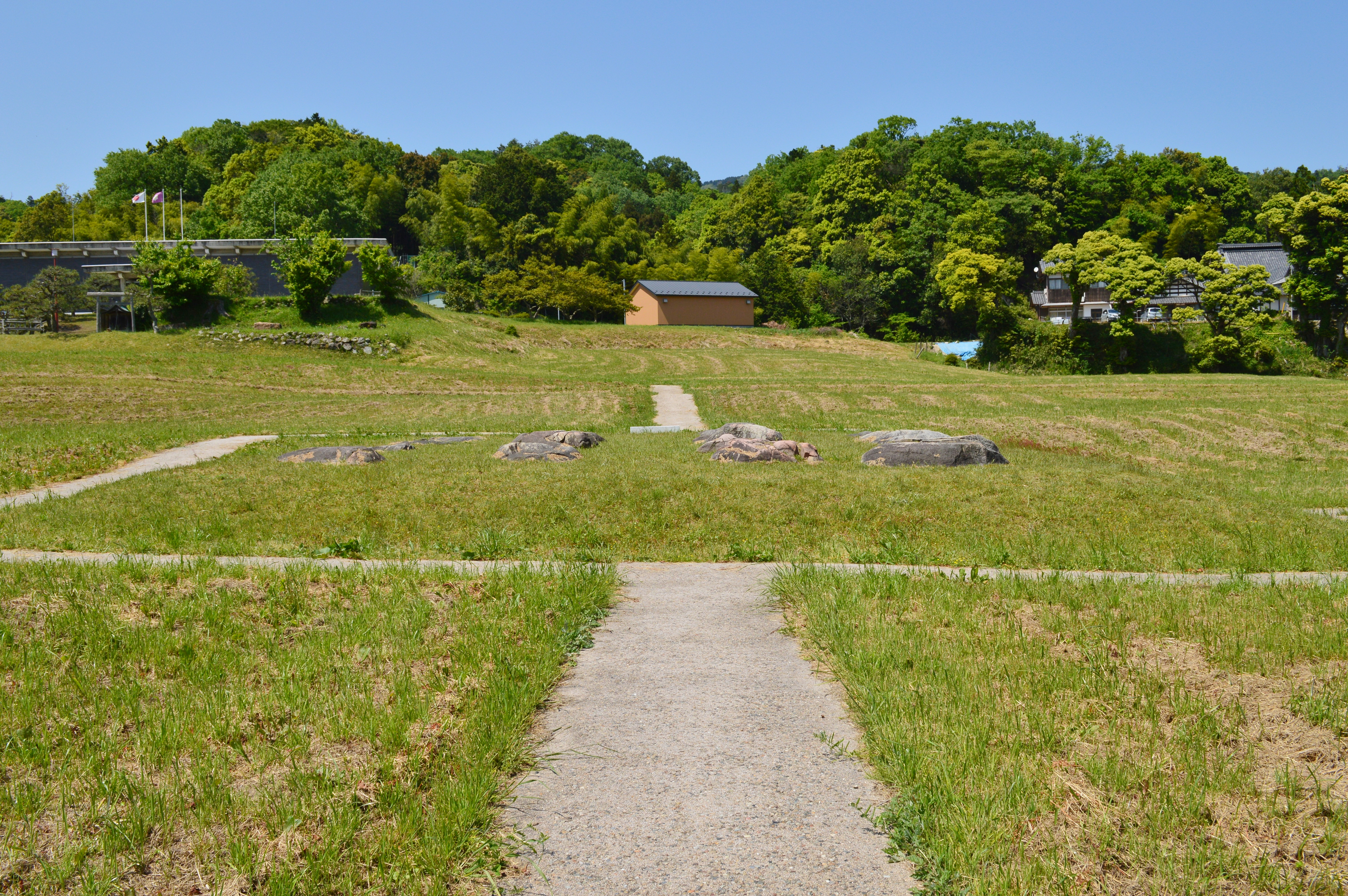
Site of the Pagoda

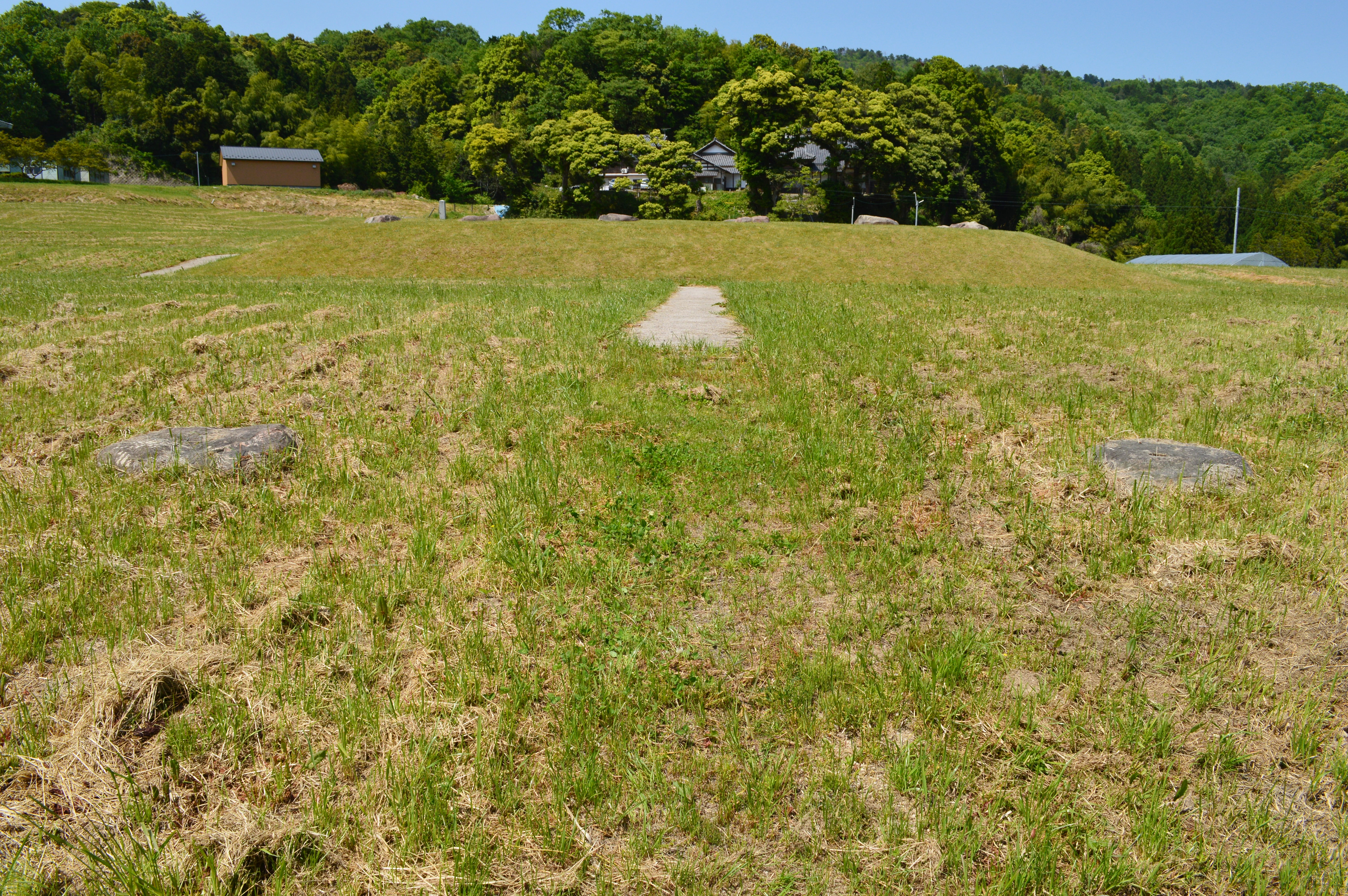
Site of the Middle Gate
current temple in back

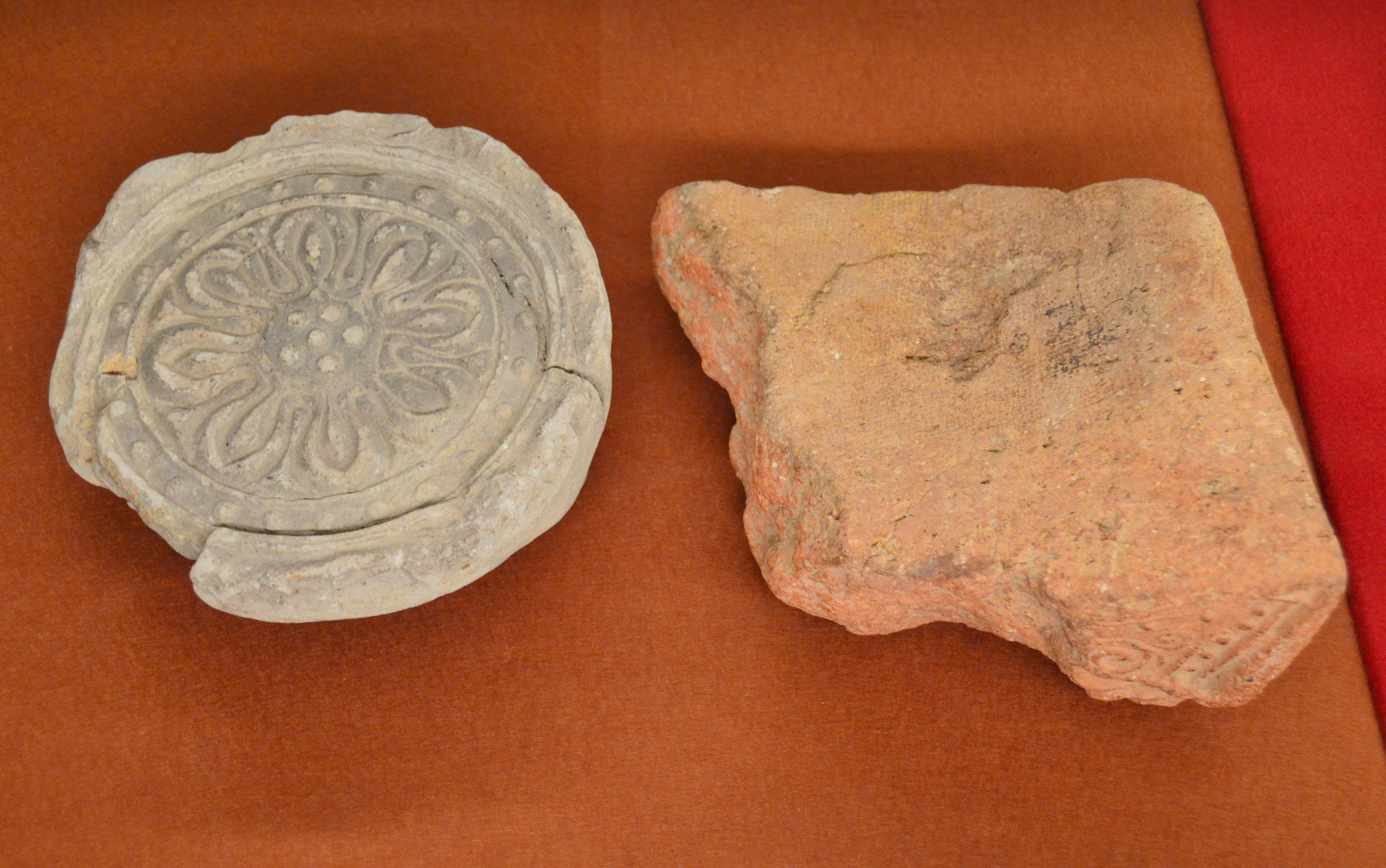
Nara period roof tiles

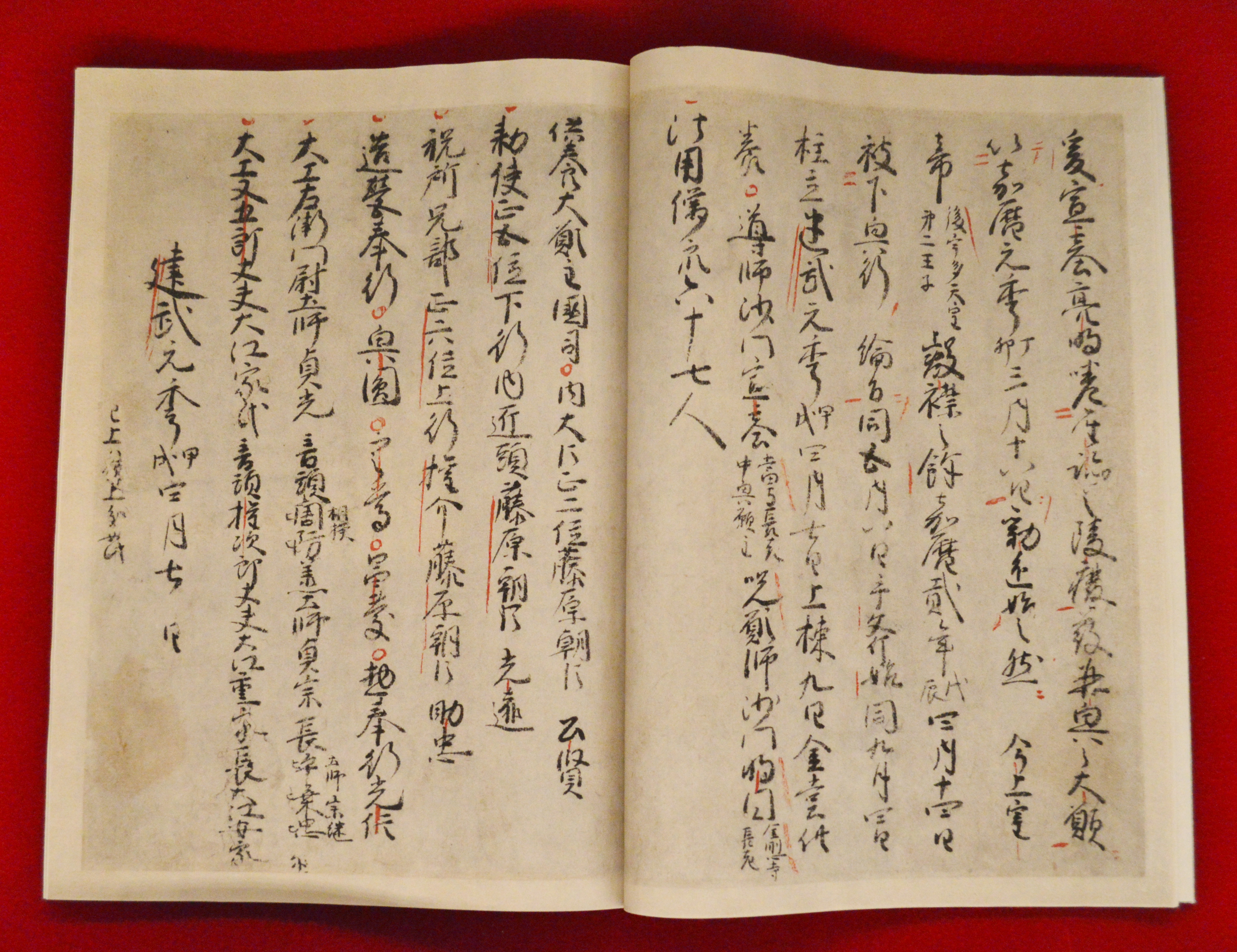
Tango Kokubunji Revival Engi (ICP)

== See also ==
- List of Historic Sites of Japan (Kyoto)
- provincial temple
