= Miyamura Station =

Railway station in Miyazu, Kyoto Prefecture, Japan

Miyamura Station 宮村駅
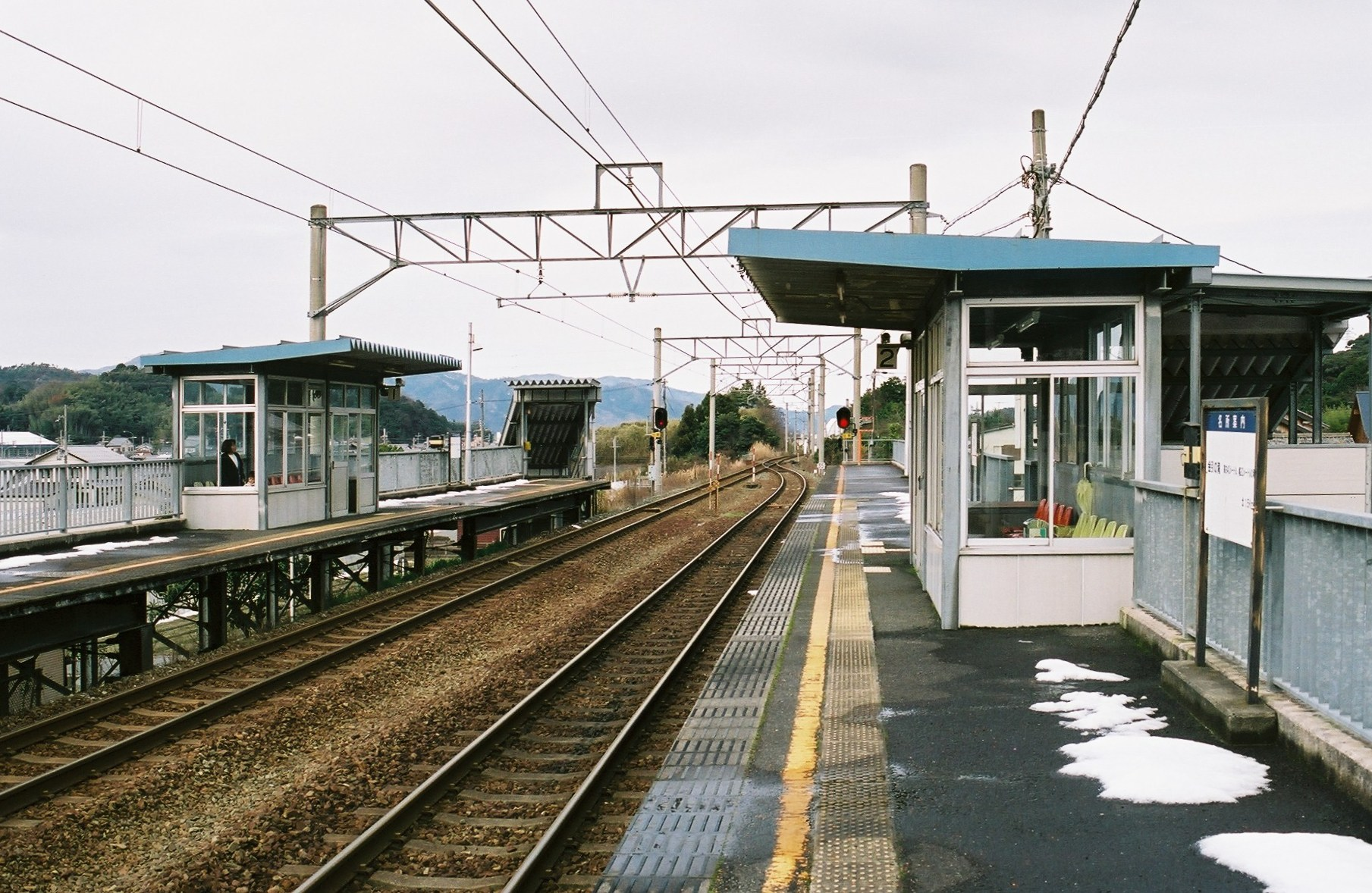
- Miyamura Station, August 2007

General information
- Location: Miyamura, Miyazu-shi, Kyoto-fu 626-0033; Japan
- Coordinates: 35.5232°N 135.1924°E
- Operator: Kyoto Tango Railway
- Line: ■ Miyafuku Line
- Distance: 28.9 km from Fukuchiyama
- Platforms: 2 side platforms
- Connections: Bus stop

Other information
- Status: Unstaffed
- Station code: F13
- Website: Official website

History
- Opened: 16 July 1988; 38 years ago

Passengers
- FY2019: 5 daily
Location
- Location within Kyoto Prefecture Location within Japan

Miyamura Station (宮村駅, Miyamura-eki) is a passenger railway station in located in the city of Miyazu, Kyoto Prefecture, Japan, operated by the private railway company Willer Trains (Kyoto Tango Railway).

== Lines ==
Miyamura Station is a station of the Miyafuku Line, and is located 28.9 kilometers (18.0 mi) from the terminus of the line at Fukuchiyama Station.

== Station layout ==
The station consists of two opposed side platforms located on an embankment. There is no station building and the station is unattended.

== Adjacent stations ==
«	Service	»
Miyafuku Line
Kita	Local (including "Tango Aomatsu" 3, 4)	Miyazu
Ōeyamaguchi-Naiku ("Ōeyama" 1, 4, 5, 6, 7); Karakawa ("Ōeyama" 2); Kita ("Ōeyama" 3)	Rapid "Ōeyama"	Miyazu
Ōeyamaguchi-Naiku	Rapid "Tango Aomatsu" 2	Miyazu
Limited express "Hashidate", "Tango Relay": Does not stop at this station

== History ==
The station was opened on 16 July 1988.

== Passenger statistics ==
In fiscal 2019, the station was used by an average of 5 passengers daily.

== Surrounding area ==
- Yurigaoka housing complex

== See also ==
- List of railway stations in Japan
