= Miyazu Domain =

Japanese feudal domain located in Tango Province

Miyazu Domain 宮津藩
- under Tokugawa shogunate Japan
- 1600–1871
- Capital: Miyazu Castle
- Area
  - Coordinates: 35°32′11.6″N 135°11′53.9″E
- Government
  - Type: Daimyō
- Historical era: Edo period
  - Established: 1600
  - Kyōgoku clan: 1600
  - Nagai clan: 1669
  - Abe clan: 1681
  - Okudaira clan: 1697
  - Aoyama clan: 1717
  - Honjō-Matsudaira clan: 1758
  - Disestablished: 1871
- Today part of: part of Kyoto Prefecture

Location of Miyazu Castle
Miyazu Domain (Japan)

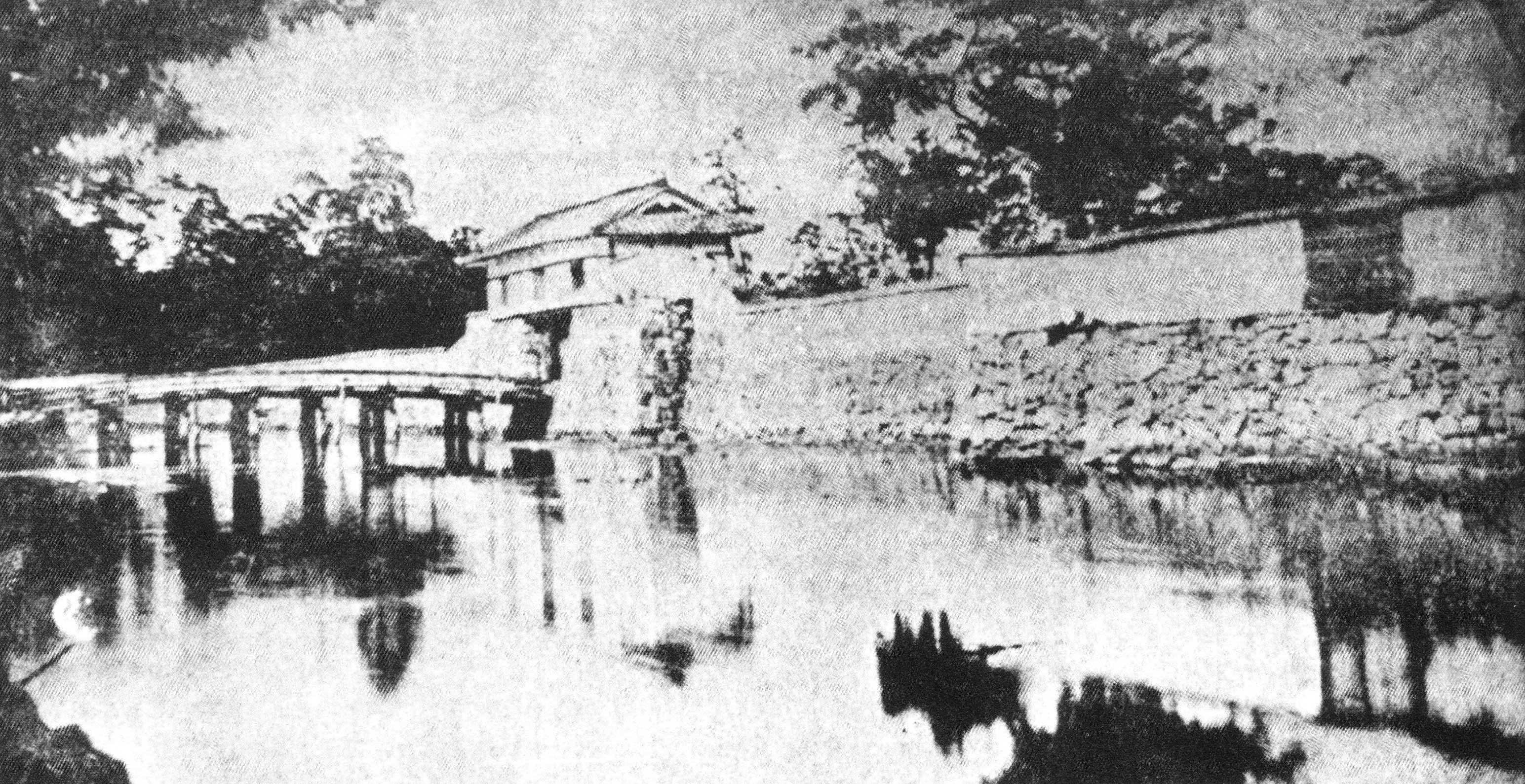
Miyazu Castle

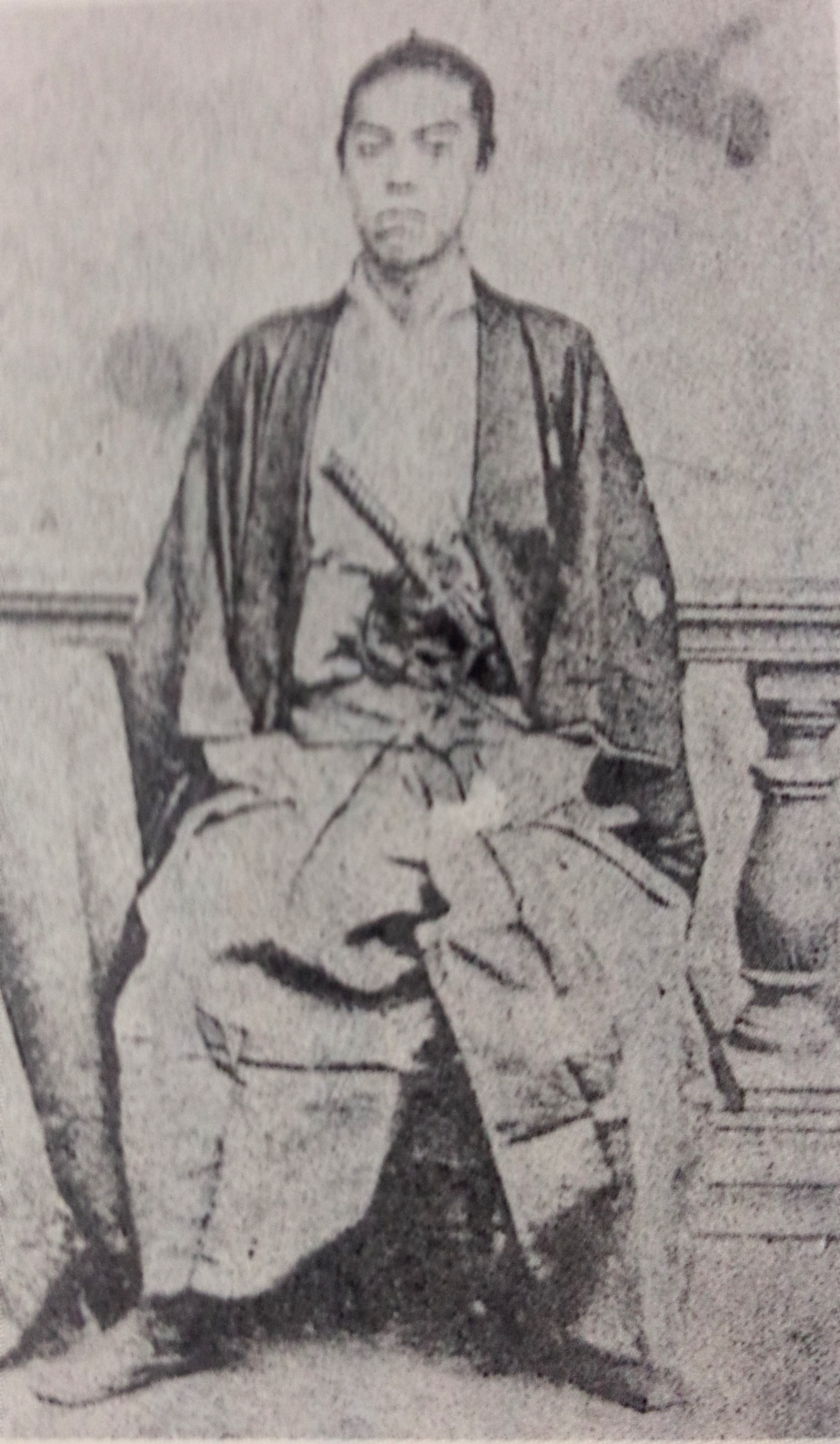
Matsudaira Munetake, final daimyō of Miyazu

Miyazu Domain (宮津藩, Miyazu-han) was a feudal domain under the Tokugawa shogunate of Edo period Japan, located in Tango Province in what is now the northern portion of modern-day Kyoto Prefecture. It was centered around the Miyazu Castle which was located in what is now the city of Miyazu, Kyoto and was controlled by a number of fudai daimyō clans through its history.

== History ==
From the Muromachi period, Tango Province had been under the control of the Isshiki clan. However, in the Sengoku period, Toyotomi Hideyoshi placed the province under the control of Hosokawa Tadaoki. Following the Battle of Sekigahara, Tokugawa Ieyasu awarded the entire province of Tango to Kyōgoku Takatomo, who established Miyazu Domain. To ensure the succession of his line, Kyōgoku Takatomo gave 35,000 koku of his holdings to his third son, Kyōgoku Takamitsu, and established a cadet branch of the clan at Tango-Tanabe Domain, and 10,000 koku to his grandson, Kyōgoku Takamichi, who established Mineyama Domain. This proved to be a wise decision, his grandson Kyōgoku Takakuni was charged with misconduct and poor governance by the Tokugawa shogunate and reduced to hatamoto status in 1666.

After a couple years as a tenryō territory, Miyazu was revived for Nagai Nagayuki, formerly of Yodo Domain. His son, Nagai Naonaga was murdered by Naito Tadakatsu of Toba Domain in 1680. As he was without heir, Miyazu was assigned to the Abe clan, Okudaira clan and then to a cadet branch of the Matsudaira clan, the Honjō-Matsudaira, who ruled from 1758 to the Meiji restoration. The 6th daimyō, Matsudaira Munehide served as Kyoto shoshidai, and rōjū during the tumultuous Bakumatsu period. The domain reluctantly fought for the shogunate during Battle of Toba-Fushimi at the opening of the Boshin War, but switched sides shortly after the defeat of Tokugawa forces. Miyazu Domain became "Miyazu Prefecture" in 1871, then part of "Toyooka Prefecture" before becoming part of Kyoto Prefecture in 1876. The Honjo-Matsudaira clan was later ennobled with the kazoku peerage title of shishaku (viscount).

== Holdings at the end of the Edo period ==
As with most domains in the han system, Miyazu Domain consisted of several discontinuous territories calculated to provide the assigned kokudaka, based on periodic cadastral surveys and projected agricultural yields.

- Tango Province
  - 7 villages in Naka District
  - 28 villages in Takeno District
  - 84 villages in Yosa District
  - 11 villages in Kasa District
- Ōmi Province
  - 1 village in Kurita District
  - 1 village in Yasu District
  - 11 villages in Kōga District
  - 6 villages in Gamō District

== List of daimyō ==
#	Name	Tenure	Courtesy title	Court Rank	kokudaka
Kyōgoku clan, 1600-1666 (Tozama)
1	Kyōgoku Takatomo (京極高知)	1600 - 1622	Tango-no-kami (丹後守); Jiju (侍従)	Junior 4th Rank, Lower Grade (従四位下)	123,000 koku
2	Kyōgoku Takahiro (京極高広)	1622 - 1654	Tango-no-kami (丹後守)	Junior 4th Rank, Lower Grade (従四位下)	78,000 koku
3	Kyōgoku Takakuni (京極 高国)	1654 - 1666	Tango-no-kami (丹後守); Jiju (侍従)	Junior 4th Rank, Lower Grade (従四位下)	78,000 koku
tenryō 1666 - 1669
Nagai clan, 1669-1680 (Fudai)
1	Nagai Naoyuki (永井尚征)	1669 - 1673	Ukon-no-taifu(右近夫)	Junior 5th Rank, Lower Grade (従五位下)	73,000 koku
2	Nagai Naonaga (永井 尚長)	1673 - 1680	Shinano-no-kami (信濃守)	Junior 5th Rank, Lower Grade (従五位下)	73,000 koku
Abe clan, 1681-1697 (Fudai)
1	Abe Masakuni (阿部正邦)	1681 - 1697	Tsushima-no-kami (対馬守)	Junior 5th Rank, Lower Grade (従五位下)	99,000 koku
Okudaira clan, 1697-1717 (Fudai)
1	Okudaira Masashige (奥平昌成)	1697 - 1717	Daizen-no-daibu (大膳大夫)	Junior 4th Rank, Lower Grade (従四位下)	90,000 koku
Aoyama clan, 1717-1758 (Fudai)
1	Aoyama Yoshihide (青山幸秀)	1717 - 1744	Daizen-no-suke (大膳亮)	Junior 5th Rank, Lower Grade (従五位下)	48,000 koku
2	Aoyama Yoshimichi (京極 高備)	1744 - 1758	Yamato-no-kami (大和守)	Junior 5th Rank, Lower Grade (従五位下)	48,000 koku
Honjō-Matsudaira clan, 1758-1871 (Fudai)
1	Matsudaira Sukemasa (松平 資昌)	1758 - 1761	Iyo-no-kami (伊予守)	Junior 5th Rank, Lower Grade (従五位下)	70,000 koku
2	Matsudaira Suketada (松平資尹)	1761 - 1765	Osumi-no-kami (大隅守)	Junior 5th Rank, Lower Grade (従五位下)	70,000 koku
3	Matsudaira Suketsugu (松平資承)	1765 - 1795	Iyo-no-kami (伊予守)	Junior 5th Rank, Lower Grade (従五位下)	70,000 koku
4	Matsudaira Munetada (松平宗允)	1795 - 1808	Osumi-no-kami (大隅守)	Junior 5th Rank, Lower Grade (従五位下)	70,000 koku
5	Matsudaira Muneakira (松平宗発)	1808 - 1840	Hoki-no-kami (伯耆守); Jiju(侍従)	Junior 4th Rank, Lower Grade (従四位下)	70,000 koku
6	Matsudaira Munehide (松平宗秀)	1841 - 1866	Hoki-no-kami (伯耆守); Jiju(侍従)	Junior 4th Rank, Lower Grade (従四位下)	70,000 koku
7	Matsudaira Munetake (松平宗武)	1866 - 1871	Hoki-no-kami (伯耆守);	Junior 4th Rank, Lower Grade (従四位下)	70,000 koku

== See also ==
- List of Han
- Abolition of the han system
