= Miyazu Castle =

Japanese castle located in Miyazu, northern Kyoto Prefecture, Japan

Coordinates: 35°32′11.6″N 135°11′53.9″E

- 宮津城
- Miyazu, Kyoto Prefecture, Japan
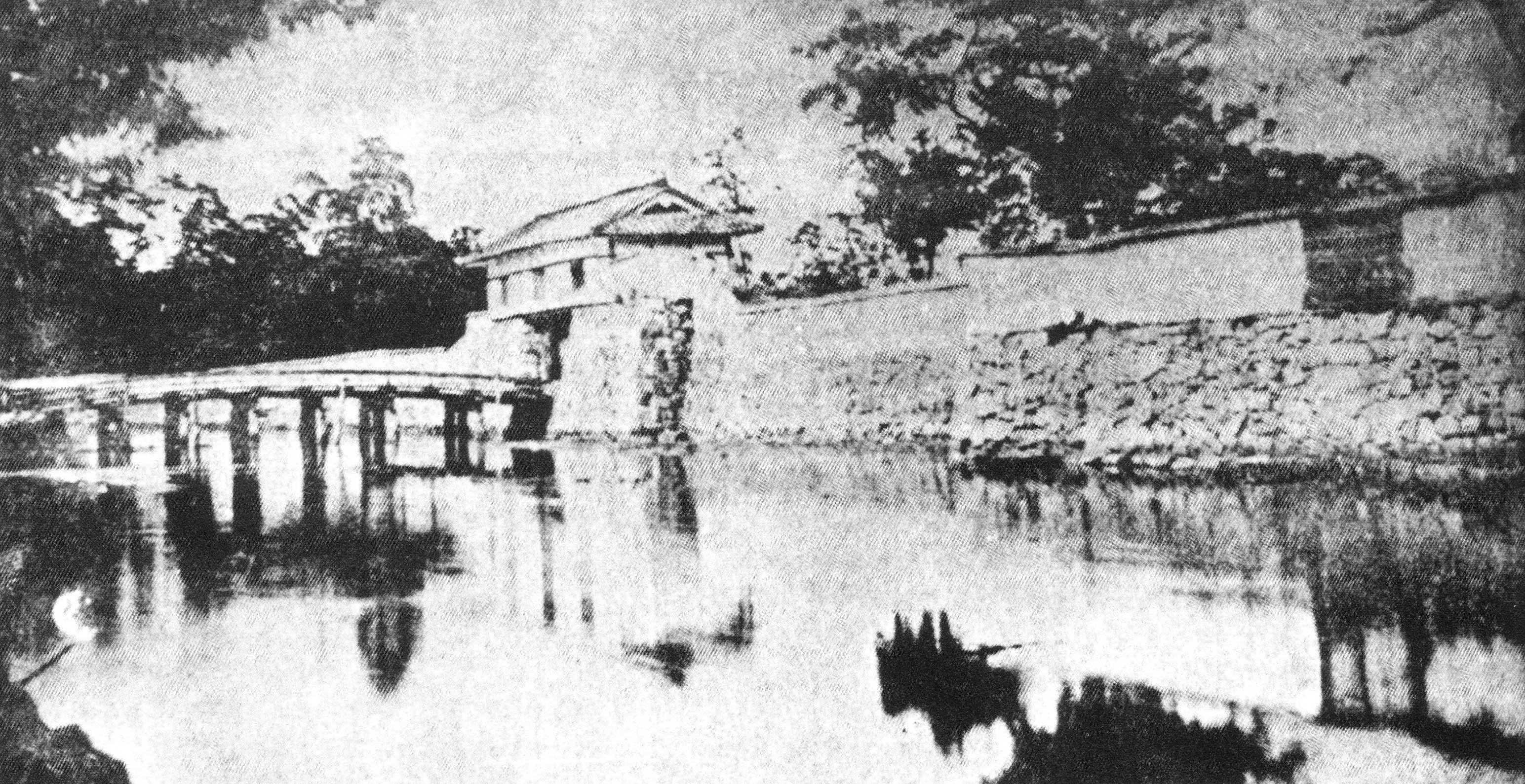
- Ōtemon and Ninomaru of Miyazu Castle, c.1870

Site information
- Type: flatland-style Japanese castle
- Open to the public: yes
- Condition: ruins

Location

Site history
- Built: 1580
- In use: Edo period
- Demolished: 1871

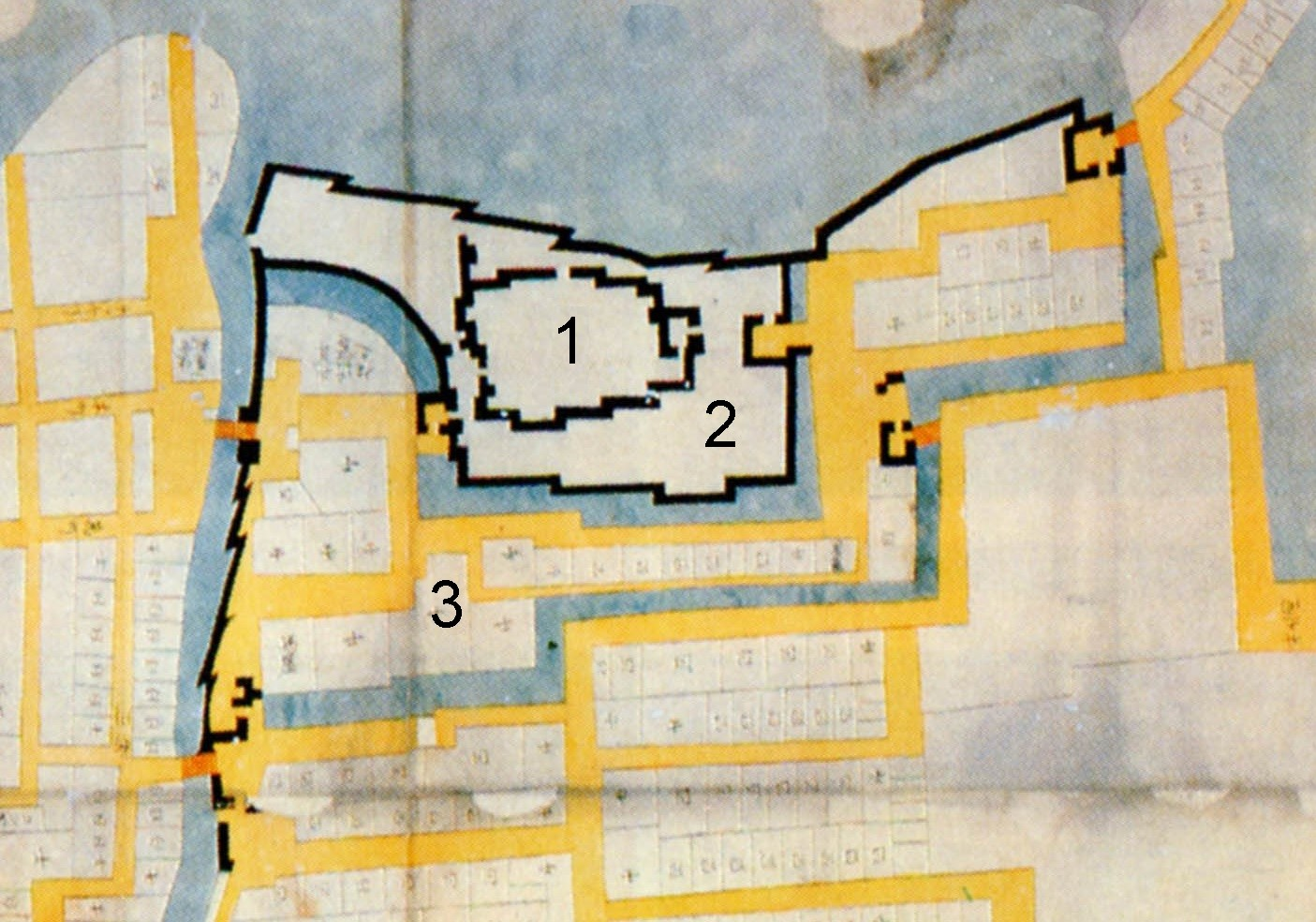
Layout of Miyazu Castle

Miyazu Castle (宮津城, Miyazu-jō) is a flatland-style Japanese castle located in Miyazu, northern Kyoto Prefecture, Japan. At the end of the Edo period, Miyazu Castle was home to a branch of the Honjō-Matsudaira, daimyō of Miyazu Domain.

== History ==
The Miyazu area was the center of ancient Tango Province and the location of its provincial capital. From the Muromachi period, the area was ruled by the Isshiki clan who served as shugo. However, in the Sengoku period, the area came under the control of the Hosokawa clan. Hosokawa Fujitaka (1564–1610) built the first Miyazu Castle at the end of Miyazu Bay in 1580. After the Honnō-ji Incident, Fujitaka retreated to Tanabe Castle, while his son, Hosokawa Tadaoki remained lord of Miyazu Castle. During the Battle of Sekigahara, Tadaoki was en route to the Kantō region with his troops in support of Tokugawa Ieyasu while Fujitaka was attacked by forces of the Western Army local to Ishida Mitsunari. Fujitaka set fire to Miyazu Castle and entrenched himself in Tanabe Castle, which he successfully defended at the Siege of Tanabe. The Tokugawa shogunate awarded the Hosokawa clan within transfer to Buzen Province, and Kyōgoku Takatomo was placed in charge of the newly-created Miyazu Domain, whose 123,000 kokudaka encompassed the entire province. In 1621, he divided his domain into three parts, with his heir, Kyōgoku Takahiro, receiving Miyazu. Kyōgoku Takahiro extensively reconstructed the castle into the current layout. However, his son Kyōgoku Takakuni was disposed by the shogunate in 1666 due to poor administration. The Nagai, Abe, Okudaira and Aoyama clans followed as lords of the castle, until finally Honjō-Matsudaira Sukemasa was assigned the domain in 1758. The Honjō-Matsudaira then remained until the Meiji Restoration in 1868, after which the castle fell into complete disrepair.

== Background ==
Miyazu Castle makes extensive use of the Ōte River to the west as its outer moat. The complex consists of the inner bailey (Honmaru), a second bailey (Ninomaru) to the east and south, separated by a moat, and the third bailey (Sannomaru), also protected by a moat and stone walls. The castle never had a tenshu, but instead relied on eight two-story yagura watchtowers located at strategic points along the fortifications.

At present, all of the moats have been filled in and the castle site itself has largely disappeared under urban encroachment. Only a few fragmentary sections of the stone walls survive in situ. One gate, the Drum Gate (太鼓門, Taiko-mon) survives, but has been relocated to the entrance of the Miyazu Elementary School. It was restored in 2010. Old photographs show a stone bridge to the main gate of the castle. The original bridge was wood, and the stone bridge depicted dates from 1888. However, it is also now gone, having been replaced by the modern road. The Haiden of the Atago Shrine in the neighboring town of Yosano, Kyoto is a building that was relocated from the entrance of a shrine that once was located in Miyazu Castle.

== Literature ==
- De Lange, William (2021). An Encyclopedia of Japanese Castles. Groningen: Toyo Press. pp. 600 pages. ISBN 978-9492722300.
- Schmorleitz, Morton S. (1974). Castles in Japan. Tokyo: Charles E. Tuttle Co. pp. 144–145. ISBN 0-8048-1102-4.
- Hinago, Motoo (1986). Japanese Castles. Tokyo: Kodansha. p. 200 pages. ISBN 0-87011-766-1.
- Mitchelhill, Jennifer (2004). Castles of the Samurai: Power and Beauty. Tokyo: Kodansha. p. 112 pages. ISBN 4-7700-2954-3.
- Turnbull, Stephen (2003). Japanese Castles 1540-1640. Osprey Publishing. p. 64 pages. ISBN 1-84176-429-9.
