= Karakawa Station =

Railway station in Miyazu, Kyoto Prefecture, Japan

Karakawa Station 辛皮駅
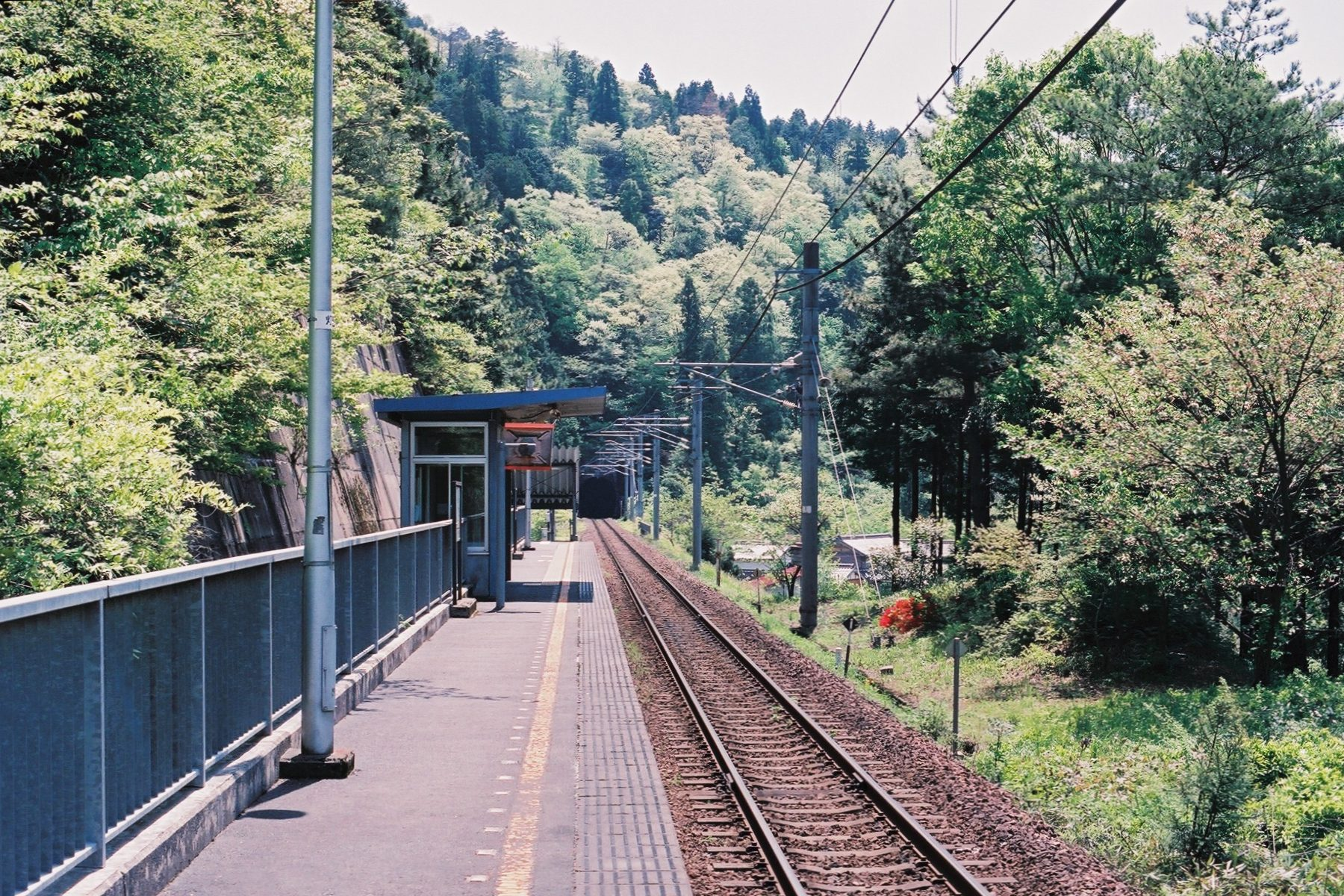
- Karakawa Station, May 2008

General information
- Location: Oda, Miyazu-shi, Kyoto-fu 626-0037; Japan
- Coordinates: 35.4624°N 135.1730°E
- Operator: Kyoto Tango Railway
- Line: ■ Miyafuku Line
- Distance: 21.3 km from Fukuchiyama
- Platforms: 1 side platform
- Connections: Bus stop

Other information
- Status: Unstaffed
- Station code: F11
- Website: Official website

History
- Opened: 16 July 1988; 38 years ago

Passengers
- FY2019: 3 daily
Location
- Location within Kyoto Prefecture Location within Japan

Karakawa Station (辛皮駅, Karakawa-eki) is a passenger railway station in located in the city of Miyazu, Kyoto Prefecture, Japan, operated by the private railway company Willer Trains (Kyoto Tango Railway).

== Lines ==
Karakawa Station is a station of the Miyafuku Line, and is located 21.3 kilometers from the terminus of the line at Fukuchiyama Station.

== Station layout ==
The station consists of one side platform serving a single bi-directional track. The station is unattended.

== Adjacent stations ==
«	Service	»
Miyafuku Line
Ōe-Yamaguchi-naiku	Local	Kita
Ōe-Yamaguchi-naiku	Rapid "Ōeyama" 2	Miyamura
Rapid "Tango Aomatsu" 1, 2: Does not stop at this station
Limited express "Hashidate", "Tango Relay": Does not stop at this station

== History ==
The station was opened on 16 July 1988.

== Passenger statistics ==
In fiscal 2019, the station was used by an average of 3 passengers daily.

== Surrounding area ==
The station is located in a rural area with few houses near the Hinoki River.

== See also ==
- List of railway stations in Japan
