= Matsudaira Muneakira =

Japanese daimyō

Matsudaira Muneakira (松平 宗発, August 10, 1782 – September 20, 1840) was a Japanese daimyō of the Edo period, who ruled the Miyazu Domain. He was the governor of Osaka until November 11, 1828, after which he was transferred to the post of Kyoto governor. This made him the highest shogunal authority in Osaka at the time of the 1827 execution of six Christians.

Preceded by Matsudaira Munetada	5th (Matsudaira/Honjō) Daimyō of Miyazu; 1808–1840	Succeeded by Matsudaira Munehide
Preceded by Mizuno Tadakuni	42nd Kyoto Shoshidai; 1828–1832	Succeeded by Ōta Sukemoto
