= Kita Station =

Railway station in Miyazu, Kyoto Prefecture, Japan

Kita Station 喜多駅
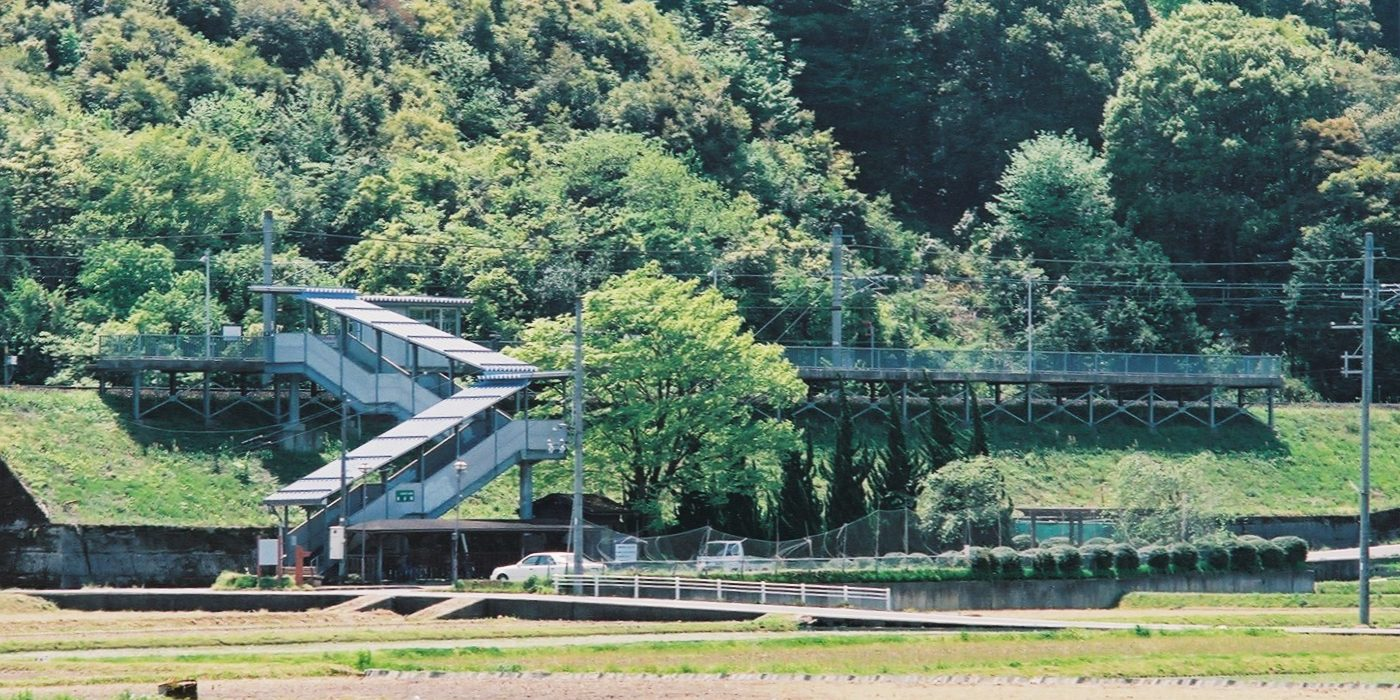
- Kita Station, May 2008

General information
- Location: Kita, Miyazu-shi, Kyoto-fu 626-0035; Japan
- Coordinates: 35.5094°N 135.1874°E
- Operator: Kyoto Tango Railway
- Line: ■ Miyazu Line
- Distance: 27.3 km from Fukuchiyama
- Platforms: 1 side platform
- Connections: Bus stop

Other information
- Status: Unstaffed
- Station code: F12
- Website: Official website

History
- Opened: 16 July 1988; 38 years ago

Passengers
- FY2019: 0 daily
Location
- Location within Kyoto Prefecture Location within Japan

Kita Station (喜多駅, Kita-eki) is a passenger railway station in located in the city of Miyazu, Kyoto Prefecture, Japan, operated by the private railway company Willer Trains (Kyoto Tango Railway).

== Lines ==
Kita Station is a station of the Miyazu Line, and is located 27.3 kilometers (17.0 mi) from the terminus of the line at Nishi-Maizuru Station.

== Station layout ==
The station consists of one side platform on an embankment, serving a single bi-directional track. There is no station building and the station is unattended.

== Adjacent stations ==
«	Service	»
Miyafuku Line
Karakawa	Local	Miyamura
Ōeyamaguchi-Naiku	Rapid "Ōeyama" 3	Miyamura
Limited express "Hashidate", "Tango Relay": Does not stop at this station

== History ==
The station was opened on 16 July 1988.

== Passenger statistics ==
In fiscal 2019, the station was used by an average of 0 passengers daily.

== Surrounding area ==
- Miyazu City Kamimiyazu Elementary School

== See also ==
- List of railway stations in Japan
