= Miyazu =

Miyazu 宮津市
- City
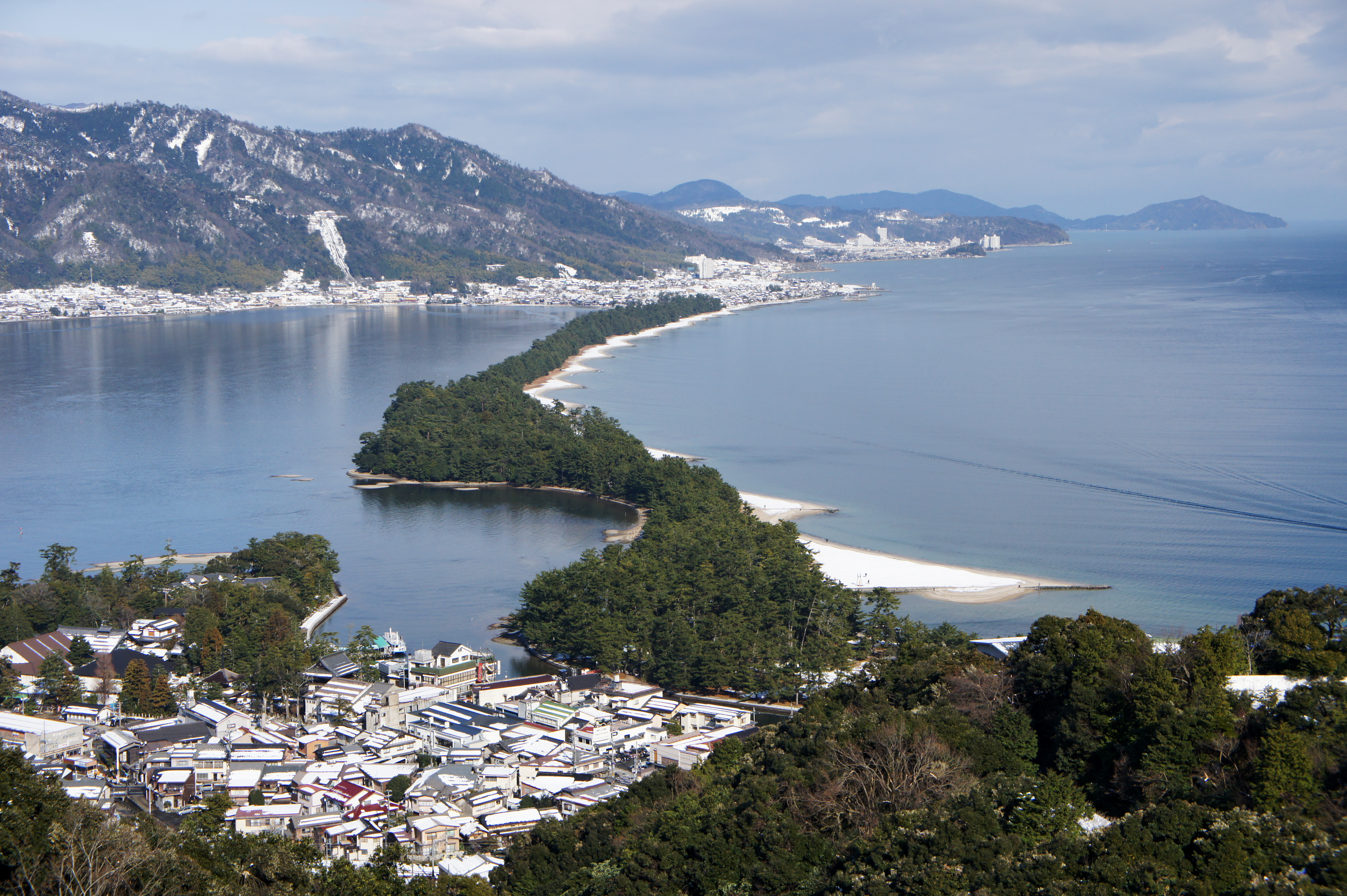
- Amanohashidate（Three Views of Japan）

- Flag Emblem

- Location of Miyazu in Kyoto Prefecture

- Location in Japan
- Coordinates: 35°32′N 135°12′E
- Country: Japan
- Region: Kansai
- Prefecture: Kyoto

Government
  - Mayor: Masafumi Kinosaki (since July 2018)

Area
  - Total: 172.74 km^{2} (66.70 sq mi)

Population (February 28, 2022)
  - Total: 16,988
  - Density: 98.344/km^{2} (254.71/sq mi)
- Time zone: UTC+09:00 (JST)
- City hall address: Yanaginawate 345-1, Miyazu-shi, Kyoto-fu 626-0024
- Climate: Cfa
- Symbols
- Flower: Cryptotaenia, Azalea
- Tree: Pinus

Miyazu (宮津市, Miyazu-shi) is a city located in Kyoto Prefecture, Japan. As of 28 February 2022, the city had an estimated population of 16,988 in 8348 households and a population density of 98 persons per km^{2}. The total area of the city is 172.74 square kilometres (66.70 sq mi).

== Geography ==
Miyazu is located in the northern part of Kyoto Prefecture at the base of the Tango Peninsula, facing Wakasa Bay of the Sea of Japan to the east. Located in Miyazu City is Amanohashidate or the "bridge to heaven", said to be one of Japan's three most beautiful sights. The naturally formed land bridge is 3.6 kilometres (2.2 mi) long and covered in pine trees.

=== Neighboring municipalities ===
Kyoto Prefecture

- Fukuchiyama
- Ine
- Kyōtango
- Maizuru
- Yosano

=== Climate ===
Miyazu has a humid subtropical climate (Köppen Cfa), featuring a marked seasonal variation in temperature and precipitation. Summers are hot and humid, but winters are relatively cold with occasional snowfall. The average annual temperature in Miyazu is 14.8 °C (58.6 °F). The average annual rainfall is 1,917.8 mm (75.50 in) with September as the wettest month. The temperatures are highest on average in August, at around 26.8 °C (80.2 °F), and lowest in January, at around 4.1 °C (39.4 °F). Its record high is 39.0 °C (102.2 °F), reached on 23 August 2024, and its record low is −7.7 °C (18.1 °F), reached on 12 February 1984.

Climate data for Miyazu (1991−2020 normals, extremes 1978−present)
Month	Jan	Feb	Mar	Apr	May	Jun	Jul	Aug	Sep	Oct	Nov	Dec	Year
Record high °C (°F)	18.3 (64.9)	22.7 (72.9)	25.9 (78.6)	30.5 (86.9)	33.1 (91.6)	36.6 (97.9)	37.8 (100.0)	39.0 (102.2)	37.7 (99.9)	32.1 (89.8)	26.9 (80.4)	22.4 (72.3)	39.0 (102.2)
Mean daily maximum °C (°F)	7.9 (46.2)	8.6 (47.5)	12.4 (54.3)	17.9 (64.2)	22.8 (73.0)	25.9 (78.6)	30.2 (86.4)	31.9 (89.4)	27.5 (81.5)	22.2 (72.0)	16.6 (61.9)	10.8 (51.4)	19.6 (67.2)
Daily mean °C (°F)	4.1 (39.4)	4.3 (39.7)	7.4 (45.3)	12.5 (54.5)	17.4 (63.3)	21.2 (70.2)	25.5 (77.9)	26.8 (80.2)	22.7 (72.9)	17.1 (62.8)	11.8 (53.2)	6.6 (43.9)	14.8 (58.6)
Mean daily minimum °C (°F)	0.9 (33.6)	0.6 (33.1)	2.7 (36.9)	7.2 (45.0)	12.4 (54.3)	17.3 (63.1)	22.0 (71.6)	22.9 (73.2)	19.0 (66.2)	13.1 (55.6)	7.7 (45.9)	3.1 (37.6)	10.7 (51.3)
Record low °C (°F)	−6.3 (20.7)	−7.7 (18.1)	−5.2 (22.6)	−1.9 (28.6)	3.5 (38.3)	7.0 (44.6)	13.6 (56.5)	15.2 (59.4)	8.8 (47.8)	2.0 (35.6)	−1.7 (28.9)	−4.2 (24.4)	−7.7 (18.1)
Average precipitation mm (inches)	202.9 (7.99)	150.4 (5.92)	136.4 (5.37)	111.9 (4.41)	132.8 (5.23)	146.1 (5.75)	199.9 (7.87)	142.1 (5.59)	226.9 (8.93)	156.1 (6.15)	124.0 (4.88)	188.5 (7.42)	1,917.8 (75.50)
Average precipitation days (≥ 1.0 mm)	20.9	16.9	15.2	11.7	10.3	11.3	12.2	9.2	11.9	11.5	14.3	18.9	164.3
Mean monthly sunshine hours	70.6	84.3	132.5	180.6	194.5	142.6	156.0	200.9	136.7	137.6	106.4	81.9	1,621.9
Source: Japan Meteorological Agency

== Demographics ==
Per Japanese census data, the population of Miyazu in 2020 is 16,758 people. Miyazu has been conducting censuses since 1920. The city's population peaked in 1945 and has declined gradually in the decades since. It is now less than half what it was post-World War II.

Historical population
Year	Pop.	±%
1920	27,264	—
1925	29,248	+7.3%
1930	30,320	+3.7%
1935	31,628	+4.3%
1940	30,639	−3.1%
1945	36,330	+18.6%
1950	36,225	−0.3%
1955	36,200	−0.1%
1960	34,799	−3.9%
1965	33,285	−4.4%
1970	31,603	−5.1%
1975	30,194	−4.5%
1980	28,881	−4.3%
1985	27,895	−3.4%
1990	26,450	−5.2%
1995	24,937	−5.7%
2000	23,276	−6.7%
2005	21,512	−7.6%
2010	19,948	−7.3%
2015	18,426	−7.6%
2020	16,758	−9.1%
Miyazu population statistics

== History ==
The area of present-day Miyazu was part of ancient Tango Province, and was then location of the provincial capital and the Tango Kokubun-ji during the late Nara and Heian period. The area came under the control of the Isshiki clan during the Muromachi period and then to Hosokawa Tadaoki in the Sengoku period. During the Edo Period, it was largely under 70,000 koku Miyazu Domain under the Tokugawa shogunate and ruled by a cadet branch of the Matsudaira clan from Miyazu Castle. After the Meiji restoration, the town of Miyazu was established within Yosa District with the creation of the modern municipalities system on April 1, 1889. Miyazu became a port for trading with the United States and the United Kingdom in July 1899. On June 1, 1954, Miyazu merged with the neighboring villages of Kunda, Yoshizu, Fuchu, Hioki, Seya, Yoro, and Higatani to form the city of Miyazu. The village of Yura was annexed on September 20, 1956.

== Government ==
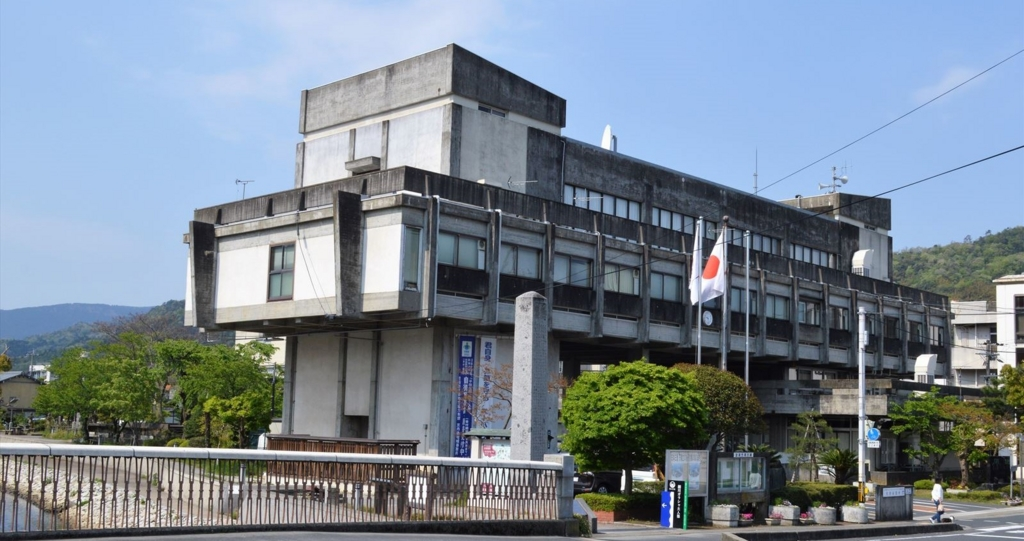
Miyazu City Hall

Miyazu has a mayor-council form of government with a directly elected mayor and a unicameral city council of 14 members. Miyazu, together with the town of Yosano contributes one member to the Kyoto Prefectural Assembly. In terms of national politics, the city is part of Kyoto 5th district of the lower house of the Diet of Japan.

== Economy ==
Miyazu has an economy based on agriculture, regional commerce, and seasonal tourism.

== Education ==
Miyazu has six public elementary schools and three public middle schools operated by the town government and two public high schools operated by the Kyoto Prefectural Department of Education. There is also one private high school.

== Transportation ==
Kyoto Tango Railway Map

=== Railways ===
Kyoto Tango Railway – Miyazu Line

- Iwatakiguchi - Amanohashidate - Miyazu - Kunda - Tango-Yura

Kyoto Tango Railway – Miyafuku Line

- Miyazu - Karakawa - Kita - Miyamura

=== Highways ===
- Kyoto Jūkan Expressway: (Maizuru)- Miyazu-Amanohashidate IC
- San'in Kinki Expressway: Yoza-Amanohashidate IC - (Yosano)
- National Route 176
- National Route 178

=== Seaport ===
- Port of Miyazu

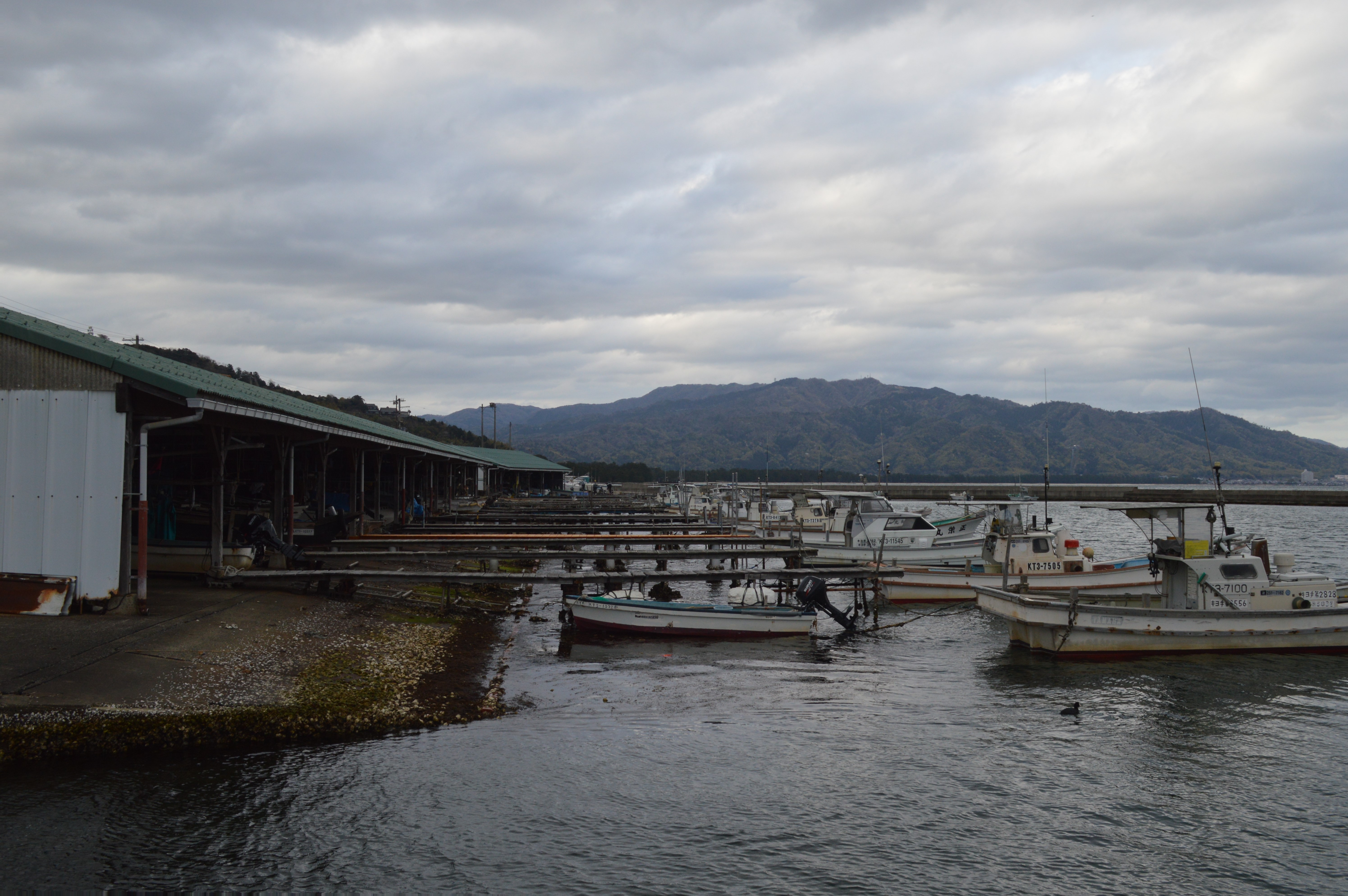
Port of Miyazu

== Sister cities ==
Country	City	State / Region	Since
New Zealand	Nelson	Nelson	1976
United States	Delray Beach	Florida	1977

== Local attractions ==
- Ama-no-Hashidate (one of the Three Views of Japan)
- Catholic Miyazu Church
- Kono Shrine (Ichinomiya of Tango Province)
- Seikiro Ryokan (Japan Heritage・No43.Tango Chirimen Textile Road)
- Tango Kokubun-ji, National Historic Site
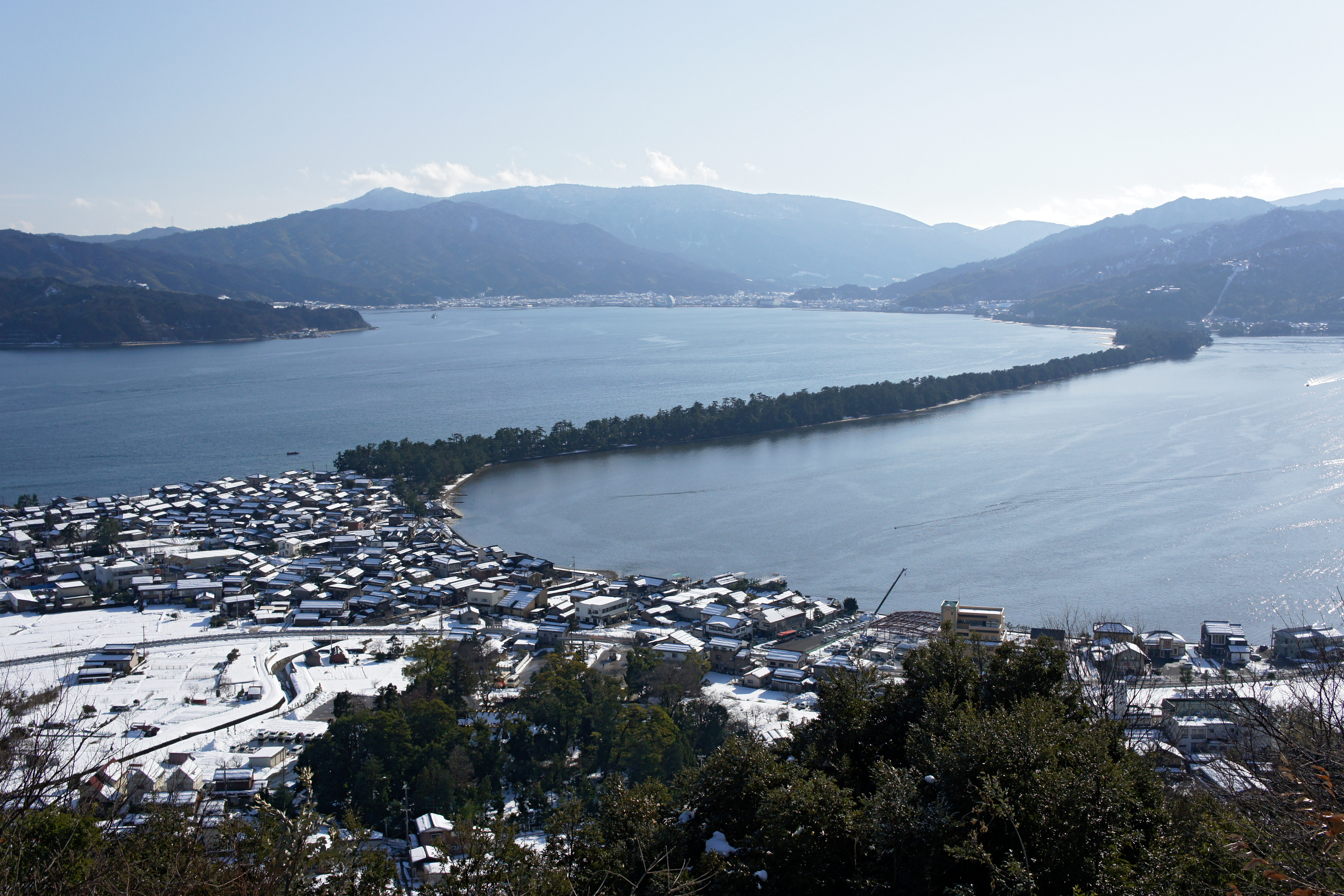
Amanohashidate

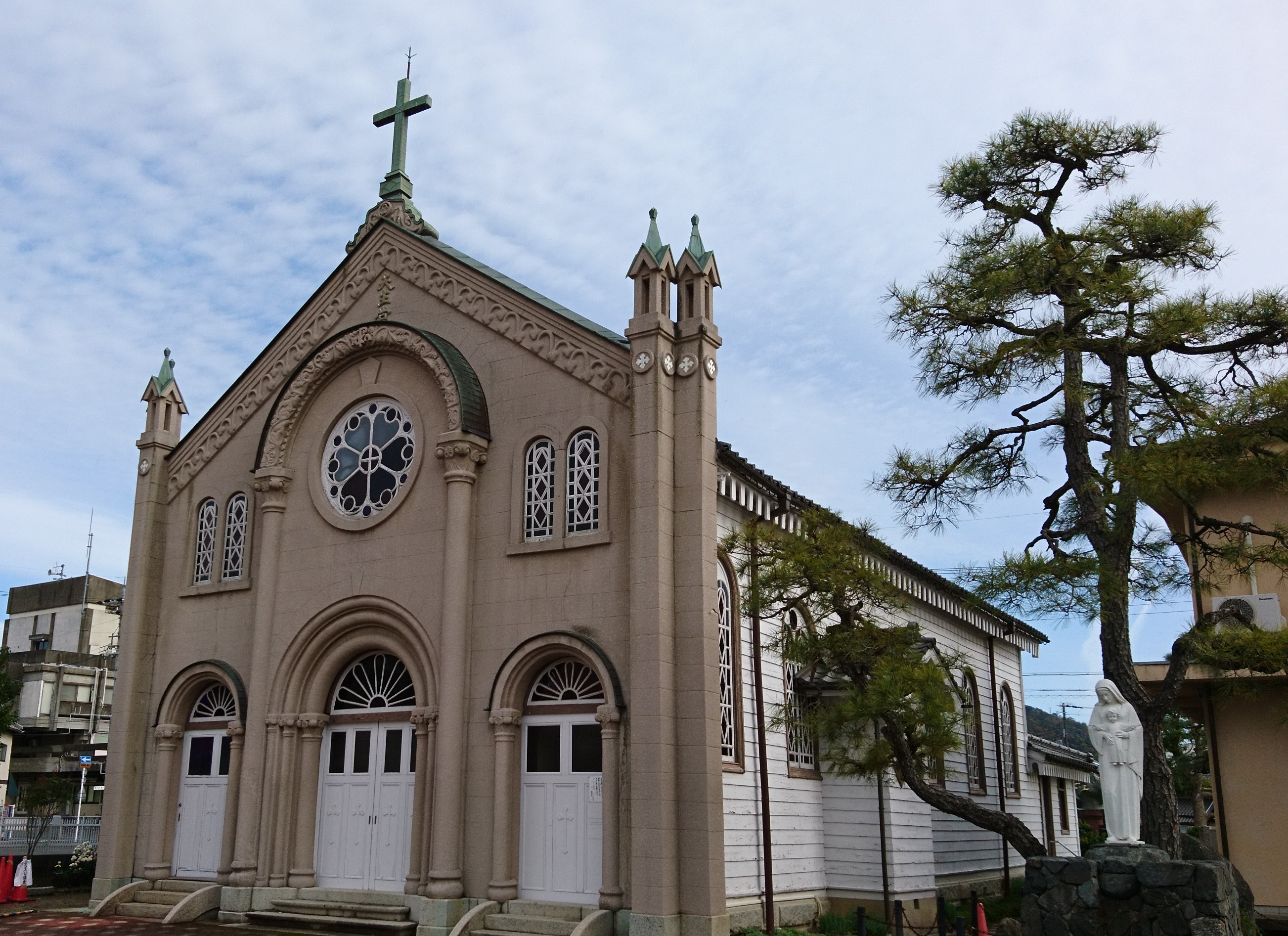
Catholic Miyazu Church

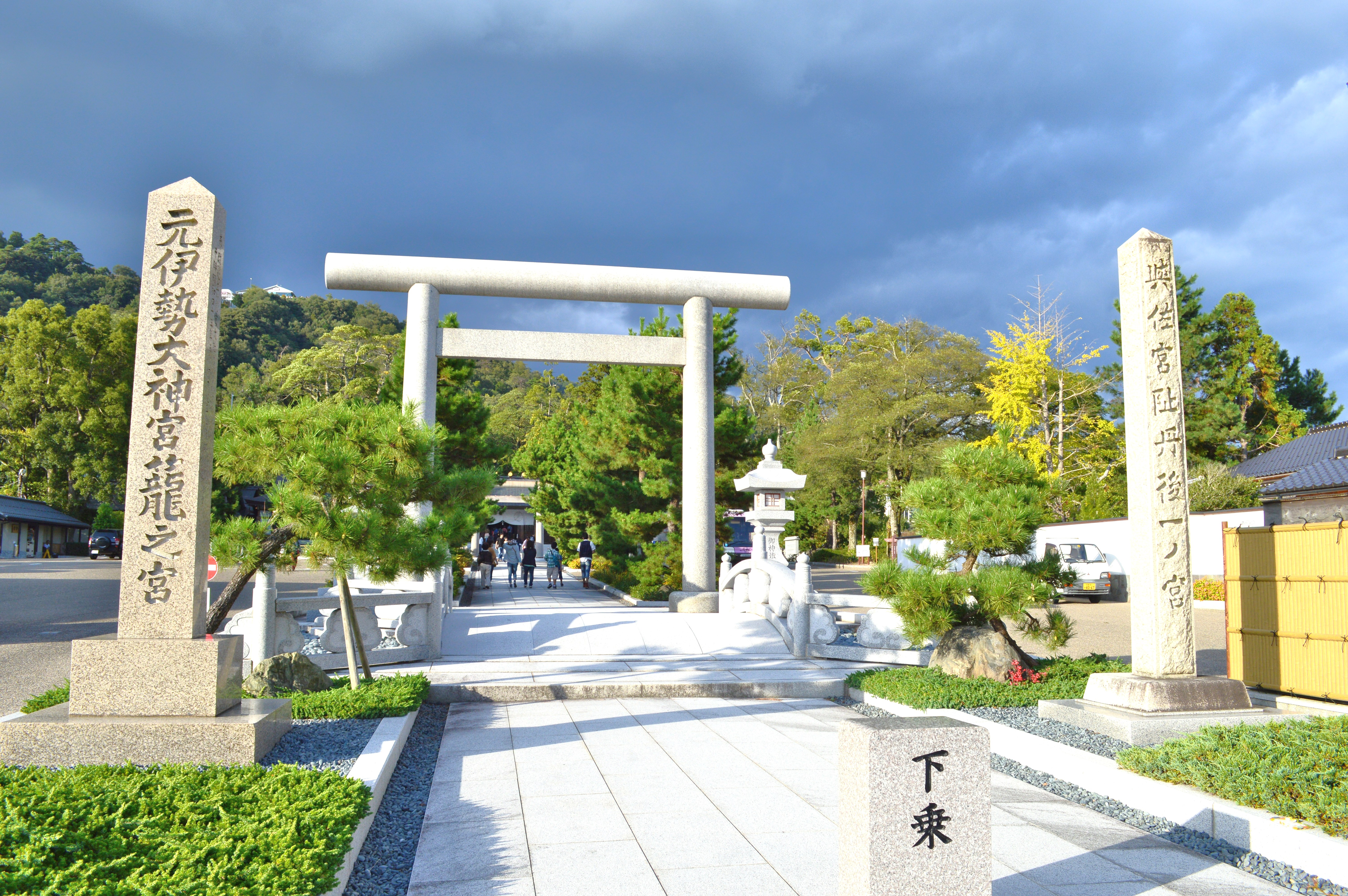
Kono Shrine

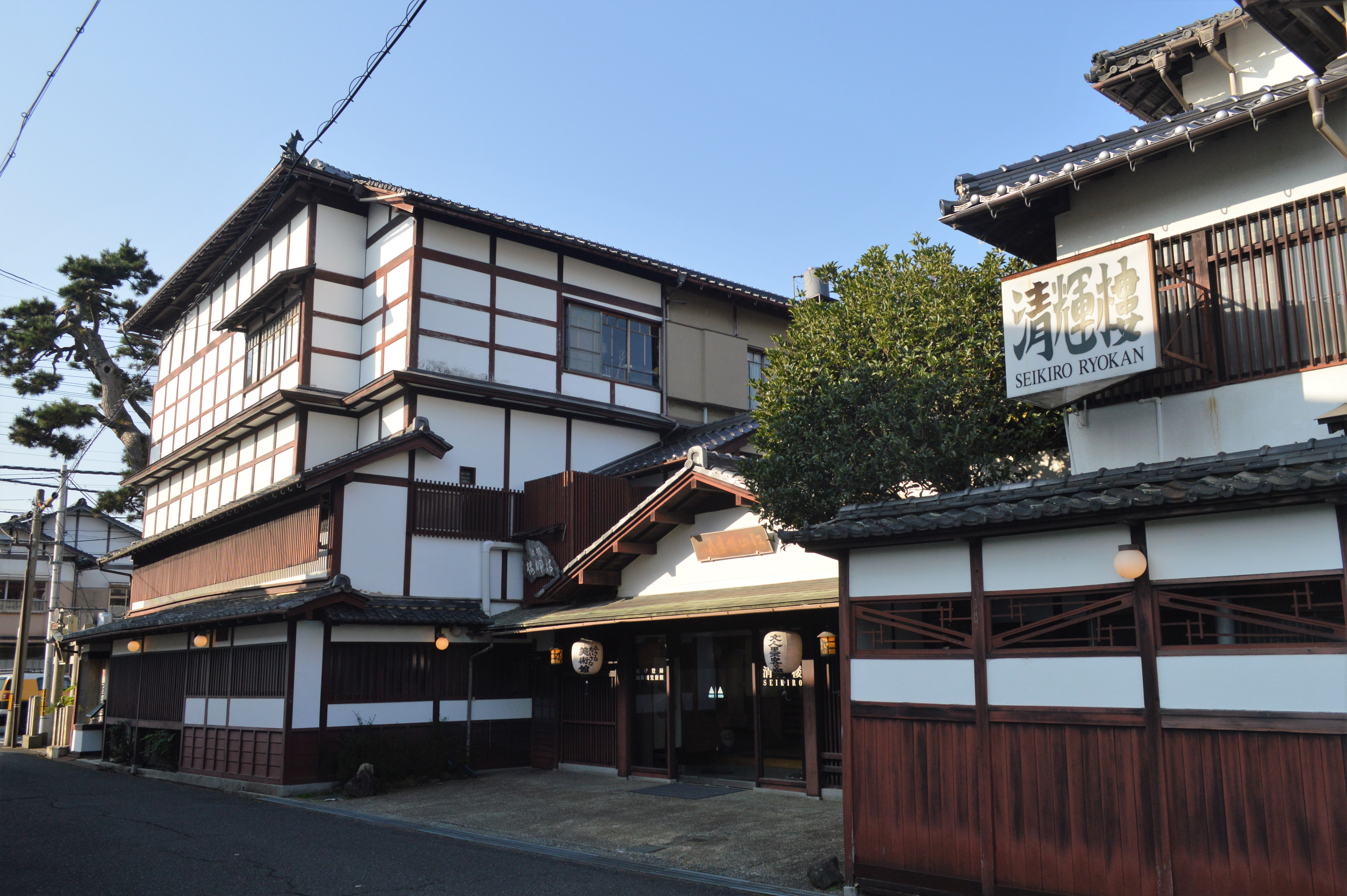
Seikiro Ryokan

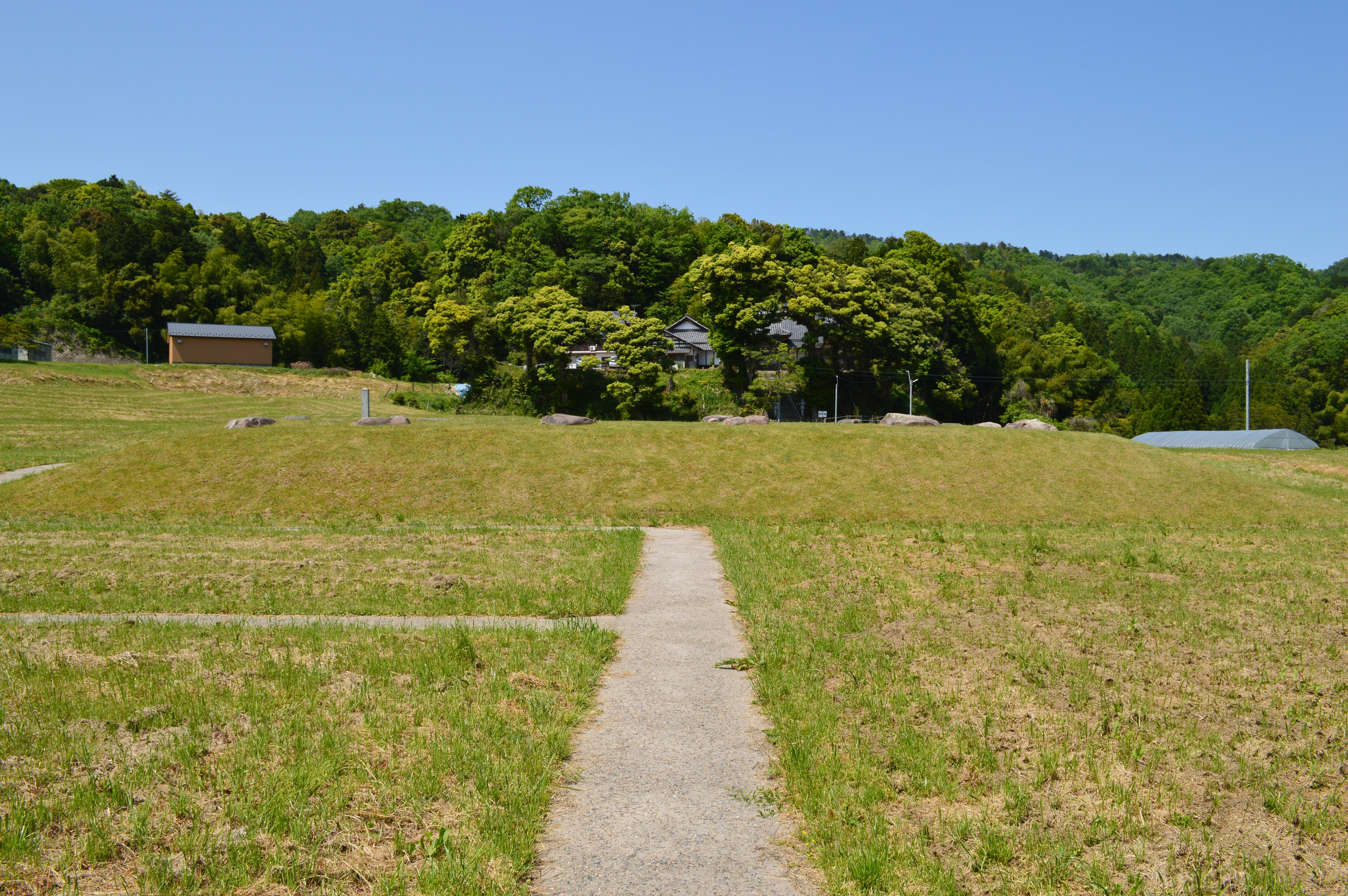
Tango Provincial temple

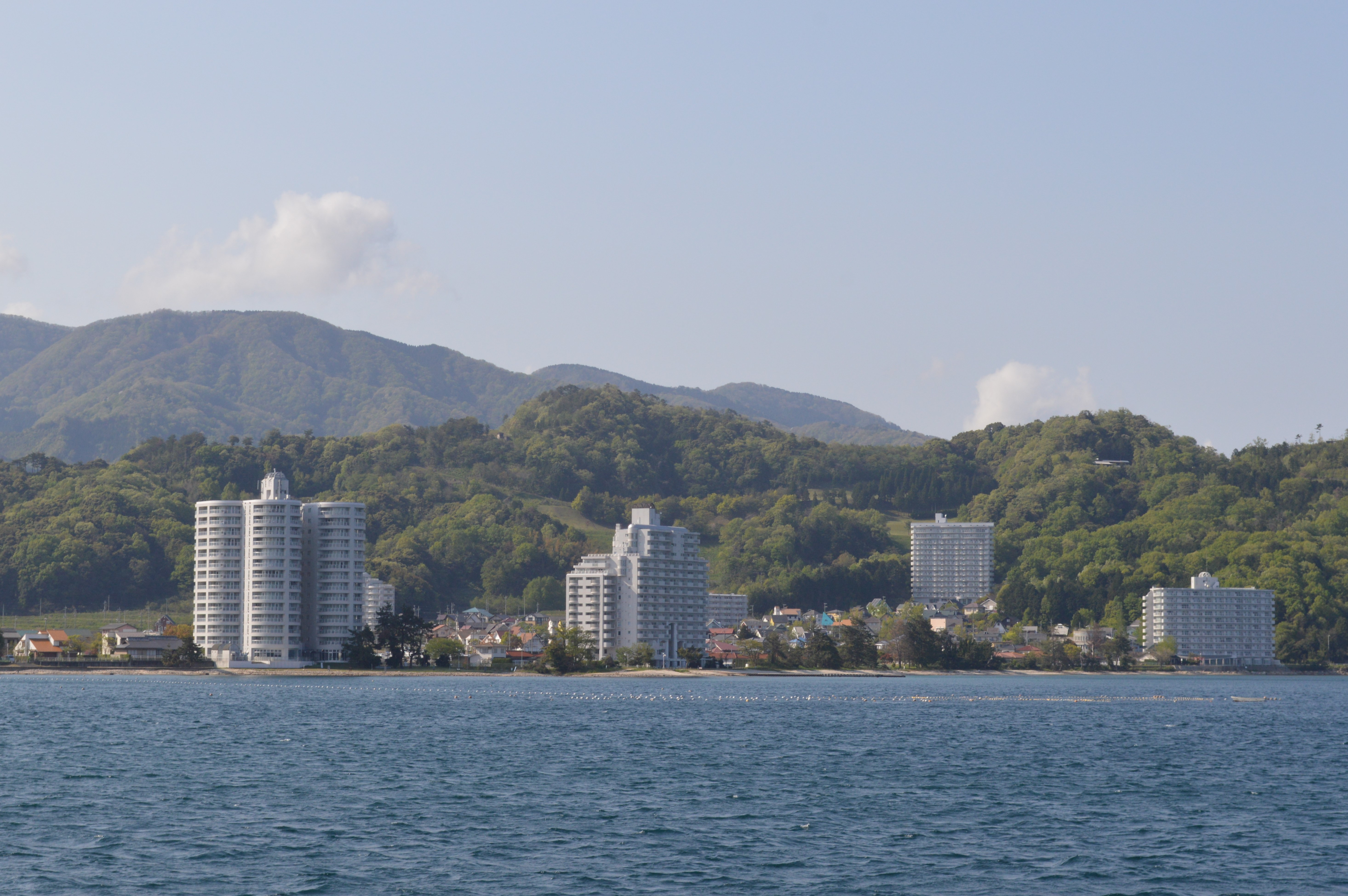
ResortMansion of Hioki Area

=== Festival＆Events ===
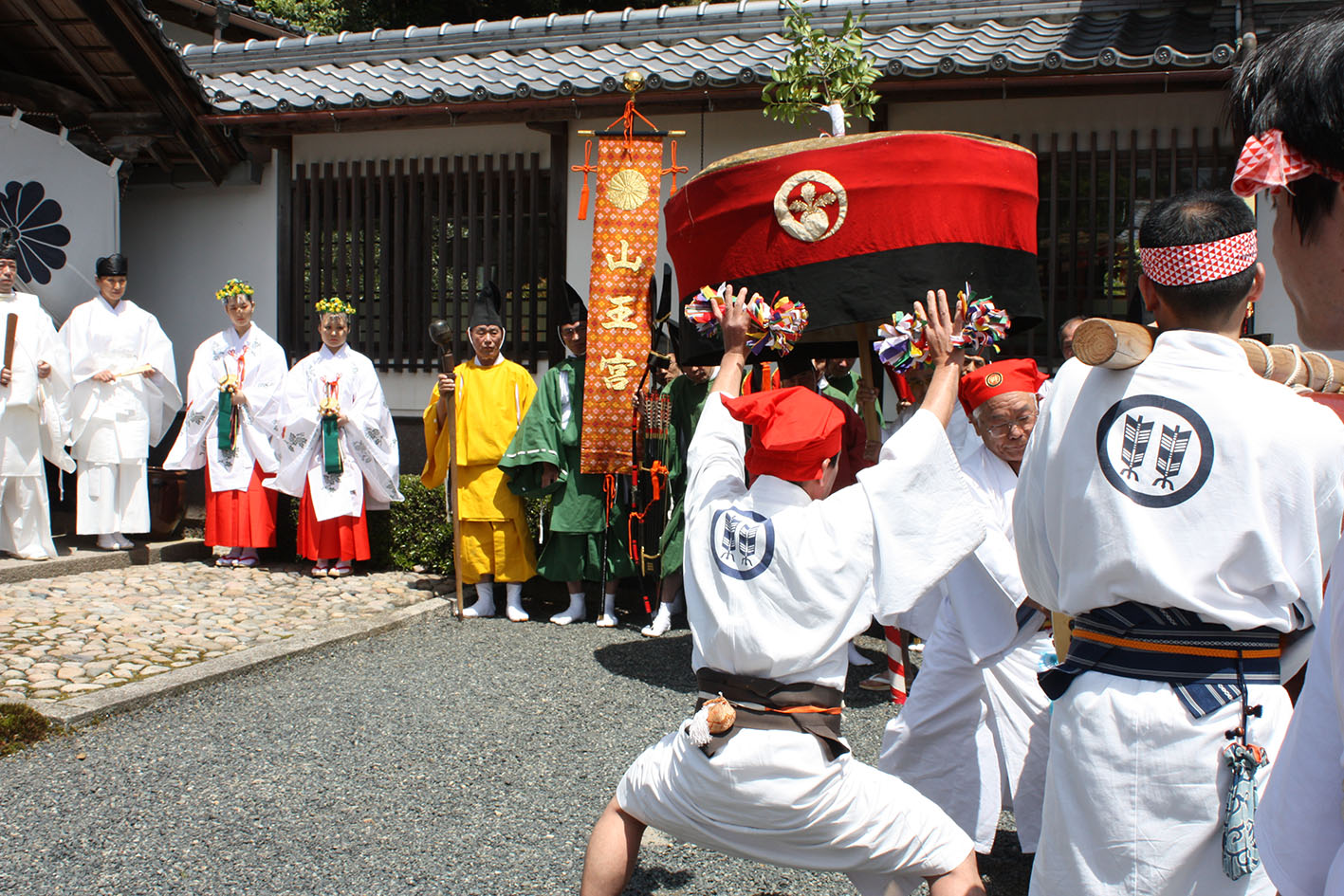
Miyazu matsuri

- Miyazu matsuri
