= Takaoka clan =

Takaoka clan (高岡氏, Takaoka-shi) are a historical Japanese clan.

== Hitachi Province ==
=== Fujiwara clan, Hatta Tomoie's descendant ===
This clan's origin is a descendant of Hatta clan in Hitachi Province. Hatta clan are descended directly from Lord Fujiwara no Kamatari (614-669) by his grandson Hatta Tomoie (Fujiwara-shi) as well as Takaoka Yasushige, grandson of Hatta Tomoie. There are a lot of descendants of him about Tokyo, Chiba and Kanagawa now.

== Izumo Province ==
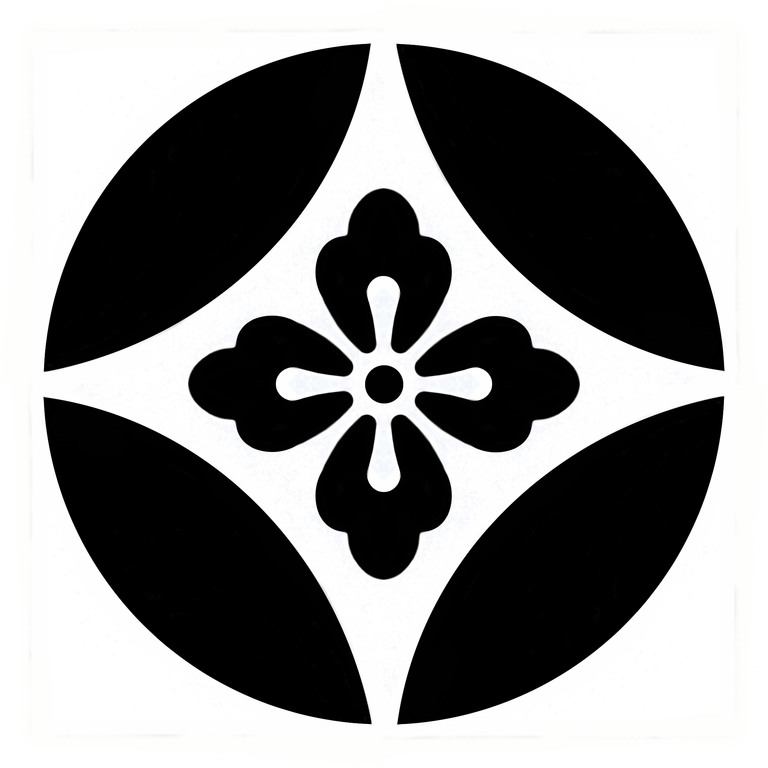
The emblem (mon) of the (Uda-genji)Takaoka clan

=== Uda Genji, Sasaki Yoshikiyo's descendant ===
This clan's origin is a descendant of Sasaki clan in Ōmi Province. Sasaki clan are descended directly from Emperor Uda (868-897) by his grandson Minamoto no Masazane (920-993) (Uda Genji), Takaoka Muneyasu (1255–1326), grandson of Sasaki Yoshikiyo, is the first who took the name of Takaoka from his domain in Takaoka-mura, Enya-no-sato, Kamdo-gun, Izumo province. It is a clan who prospered in future generations, in Izumo, Bingo, and Tajima. Takaoka clan who was the Kawarake-han (in Izumi) samurai at the first term of Edo period was the same as this clan. Afterwards, the Lord of Izumi (Koide Sigeoki clan) had lost their territories on August 12, 1696, Takaoka clan lived temporarily in Edo. After that, this clan moved to Tajima because they had become old Lord Koide Shigeoki's relative of Lord of Tajima (Koide Fusateru)'s vassal.

== Tango Province ==
=== Mononobe clan, Takaoka Sadamochi's descendant ===
This clan's origin is a descendant of Mononobe clan. Mononobe clan are descended directly from god of Nigihayahi-no-mikoto (Legend age) by his descendant Mononobe no Arakabi (Kofun period), Takaoka Sadamochi, descendant of Mononobe no Arakahi, is the first who took the name of Takaoka. Sadamochi's 8th grandson Takaoka Sadami became Ashikaga Takauji's subordinate and there were distinguished military services. And, because he had received the territory(Itanami-sho, Yosa-gun, Tango Province), the clan moved there. There are a lot of descendants of him about the place now.

== Settsu Province ==
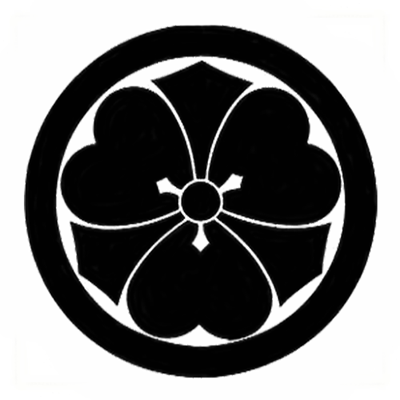
Maru-ni-Kenkatabami

=== Seiwa Genji, Tadain-gokenin (Lord Tada Mitsunaka's bodyguard samurai)'s descendant ===
This clan's origin is a descendant of Tada clan in Settsu Province. Tada clan are descended directly from Emperor Seiwa (850-881) by his descendant Lord Tada Mitsunaka (Seiwa Genji). The samurai in about 1278 had Takaoka Gensiro Nyudo and Takaoka Genjiro. And in about 1316 had Takaoka Genjiro and Takaoka Kishiro. And in about 1688 had Takaoka Ichizaemon Minamoto no Shigenao, and he was written the "Takaoka Sakon-shogen Nakatomo's 11th grandson". It is a clan who prospered in future generations, in Kawanishi City, and Sanda City. Takaoka Ichizaemon, Takaoka Gonzaemon, and Takaoka Keisuke who was the Tada Gokenin (in Settsu Province) samurai at the end term of Edo period was the same as this clan.

- Takaoka Konoemon who was the Matsue-han (in Izumo Province) samurai at the first term of Edo period was the same as this clan.

== See also ==
- Fujiwara clan
- Genji clan
- Sasaki clan
