= Sasaki Nariyori =

Sasaki Nariyori (佐々木 成頼) (976–1003) was the progenitor of the Sasaki clan, having taken the name from his domain in Ōmi Province. He was the great-grandson of Minamoto no Masanobu, progenitor of the Uda Genji.

== Family ==
- Father: Minamoto no Sukenori (951–998)
- Mother: Fujiwara no Yukinari’s daughter
- Wife: Kanno Atsuyori's daughter-Wet-nurse of Emperor Suzaku
- Children:
  - Sasaki no Yoshitsune (1000–1058) by Kanno Atsuyori's daughter
  - Minamoto no Muneyori
  - Minamoto no Noritsuna

== See also ==
- Uda Genji
- Sasaki clan
- Rokkaku clan
- Kyōgoku clan
