= Uda Genji =

Branch of a Japanese Minamoto clan

Uda Genji 宇多源氏
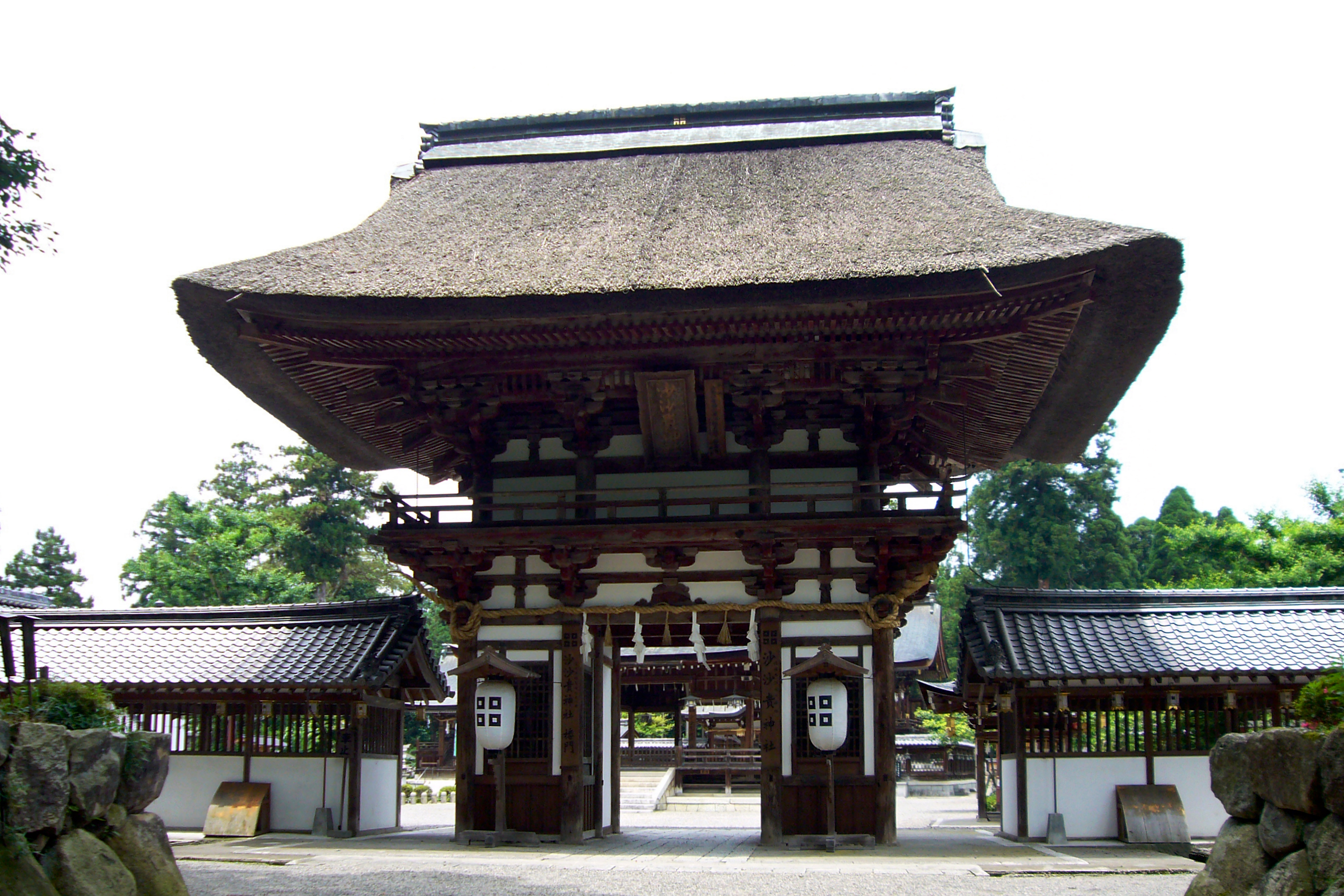
- Sasaki Shrine, shrine of the Uda Genji
- Home province: Ōmi; Izumo others
- Parent house: Minamoto clan
- Titles: Various
- Founder: Minamoto no Masazane
- Founding year: 10th century
- Cadet branches: Sasaki clan Rokkaku clan Kyōgoku clan Kutsugi clan Kuroda clan Oki clan Enya clan Toda clan Takaoka clan Koshi clan Sase clan Nogi clan others

The Uda Genji (宇多源氏) were the successful and powerful line of the Japanese Minamoto clan that were descended from Emperor Uda (宇多天皇).

== Overview ==
Many of the famous Minamoto warriors, including Sasaki clan (佐々木氏), also known as Daimyō Kyōgoku clan (京極氏); Sasaki Nariyori (佐々木成頼), the founder of the Ōmi Genji clan (近江源氏); and Sasaki Yoshikiyo (佐々木義清), the founder of the Izumo Genji clan (出雲源氏) belong to this line. The family is named after Emperor Uda, grandfather of Minamoto no Masazane (源雅信), patriarch of the Uda Genji (宇多源氏).

Emperor Uda was father of Imperial Prince Atsumi (敦實親王 Atsumi Shinnō) (892-966) - father of Minamoto no Masazane (源雅信) (920-993), founder of the Uda Genji, from whom the Uda Genji is descended.

== Cadet branches ==
Many samurai families of Ōmi and Izumo Province belong to this line and had used "Minamoto" clan name in official records, including Sasaki clan, Rokkaku clan, Kyōgoku clan, Kutsugi clan, Kuroda clan, Oki clan, Enya clan, Toda clan, Takaoka clan, Koshi clan, Sase clan, Nogi clan, etc. The Shinto shrine connected closely with the clan is known as the Sasaki Shrine (沙沙貴神社 Sasaki Jinja).

== Family tree ==
(Sumitate-Yotsumeyui), The Crest of the Rokkaku clan

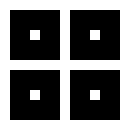
(Yotsumeyui), The mon of the Kyogoku clan

                                  ∴
                                 Emperor Uda(867-931)
                                  ┃
                                 Prince Atsumi(893-967)
                                  ┃
                                 Minamoto no Masazane(920-993)
                                  ┃
                                 Sukenori(951-998)
                                  ┃
                                 Nariyori(976-1003)
                                  ┃
                                 Noritsune(1000-1058)
                                  ┃
                                 Sasaki Tsunekata
                                  ┃
                                 Sasaki Tametoshi
                                  ┃
                                 Sasaki Hideyoshi(1112–1184)
                                  ┣━━━━━━┳━━━━━━━┳━━━━━━━┳━━━━━┓
                               　Sadatsuna  　Tsunetaka  　Moritsuna  　Takatsuna    Yoshikiyo
 ┏━━━━━━┳━━━━━┳━━━━━┫          ┃            ┃             ┃         ┣━━━━━┓
Hirotsuna  Sadashige  Hirosada  Nobutsuna    Takashige    Kaji Nobuzane  Shigetuna  Masayoshi  Yasukiyo
 ┏━━━━━━┳━━━━━━━━━━━╋━━━━━━━━┓                       ┏━━━━━┳━━━━━┫
Shigetsuna　Takanobu　Rokkaku Yasutsuna　Kyogoku Ujinobu                  Yoriyasu　Yoshiyasu　Muneyasu

== See also ==
- Seiwa Genji
- Sasaki clan
- Rokkaku clan
- Kyōgoku clan
- Amago clan
- Takaoka clan
- Sasaki Yoshikiyo
- Nogi Maresuke
