= Takaoka Muneyasu =

Takaoka Muneyasu 高岡宗泰

1st Takaoka clan of Izumo Province
- Preceded by: Kamakura period
- Succeeded by: Takaoka Muneyoshi

Personal details
- Born: 1255
- Died: 13 August 1326 (aged 71)
- Relations: Father: Sasaki Yasukiyo; Mother: Kasai Kiyochika's daughter
- Children: Tahō-maru (He died young); Takaoka Muneyoshi (adopted son); Takaoka Muneyoshi's wife Toda Moroyasu's wife

Takaoka Muneyasu (高岡宗泰; 1255 – August 13, 1326) was a Shugodai of Oki Province in the Kamakura period. He was the founder of the Takaoka clan in Izumo Province, Japan.

Takaoka Muneyasu was the 8th son of Sasaki Yasukiyo. His mother was Kasai Kiyochika's daughter. Muneyasu was Enya Yoriyasu's younger brother.

He was originally named Minamoto no Muneyasu. His alias was "Takaoka Hachirō" or "Sasaki Hachirō". His wife was from the Ii clan (Izumo Province). His official rank was Saemonnojyō. His family crest was Hana-wachigai (Shippō-ni-hanakaku).

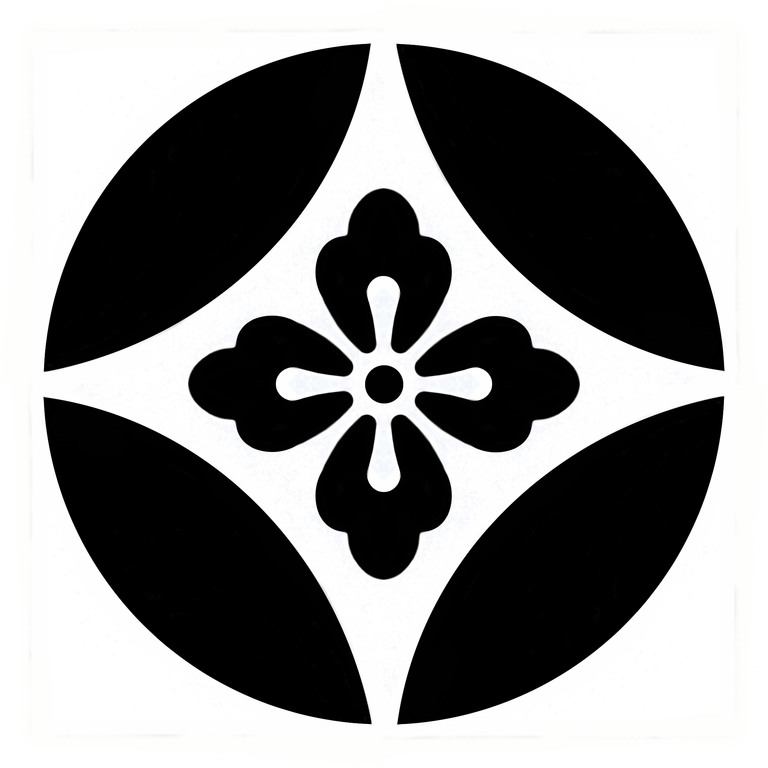
Hana-wachigai or Shippō-ni-hanakaku, the crest of the Takaoka clan

== Brief history ==
- 1274 (Kōchō 11 December of moon calendar): Because Mongol had attacked it, he became a soldier of foreign enemy defense (Ikoku-keigo ban-yaku), and he went to Coast of Kurosaki, Chikuzen Province.
- 1277 (Kenji 3 April of moon calendar): He became an acting governor in Oki Province (to one theory governor in Oki Province).
- 1287(Kōan 10th): The territory Takaoka-mura, Enya-no-sato, Izumo Province, ingot was succeeded among his father Yasukiyo's inheritances. Therefore, he became a clan name "Takaoka" for the first time.
- 1305 (Kagen 3rd): When Hōjō Munekata was revolted (The Kakitsu War), he attacked rebels running after by the Shōgun instruction.
- 1326 (Karyaku 1st): On August 13 he died at age 71. His posthumous Buddhist name was "Kakunen".

== See also ==
- Genji clan
- Sasaki clan
- Takaoka clan
- Battle of Bun'ei
- Battle of Kōan
- Mongol Invasions of Japan
