= Sasaki Yoshikiyo =

Japanese samurai

Sasaki Yoshikiyo (佐々木 義清; 1161–1242) was a samurai member of the Minamoto clan, who was the founder of Izumo-Genji clan.

== Background ==
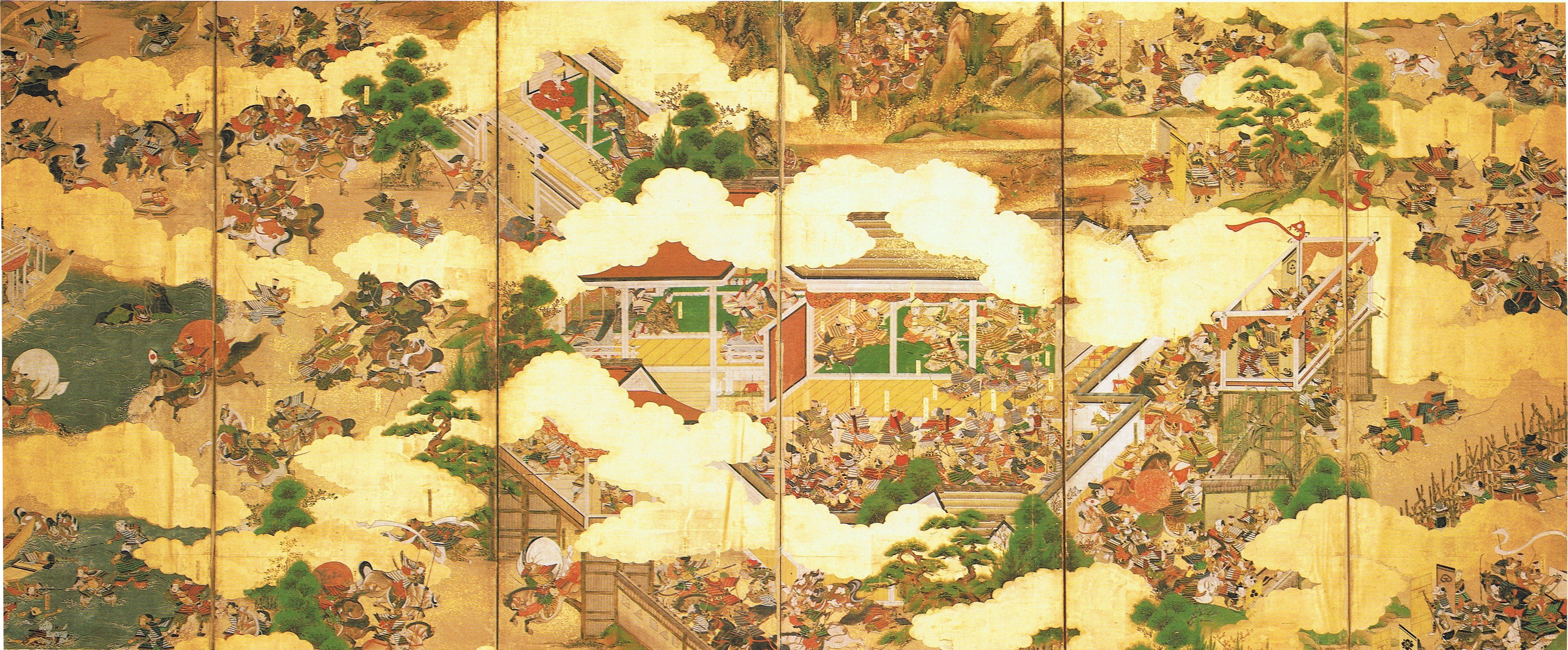
Genpei war

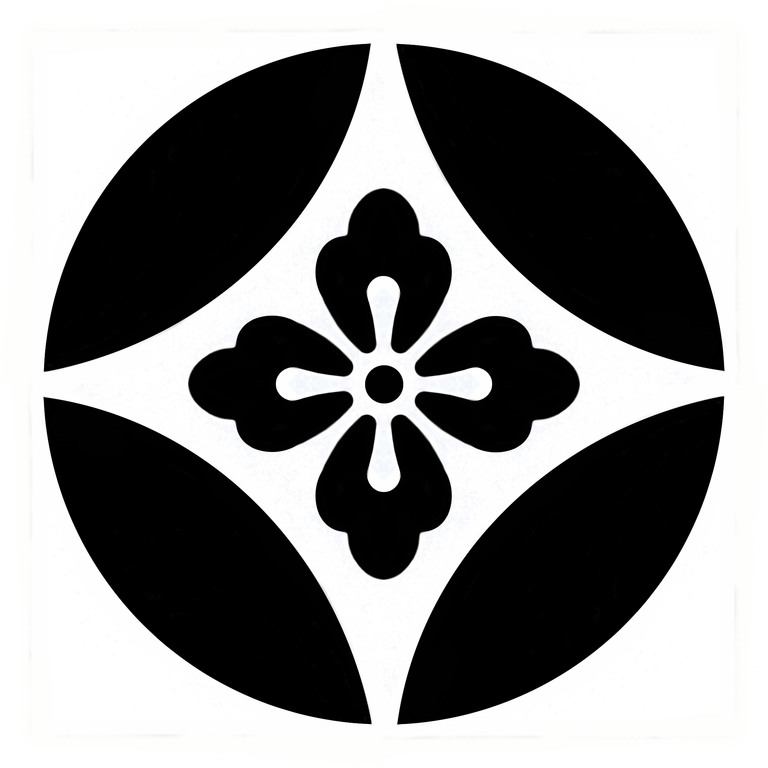
(Hana-wachigai) or (Shippō-ni-hanakaku), The Crest of the Izumo Genji clan

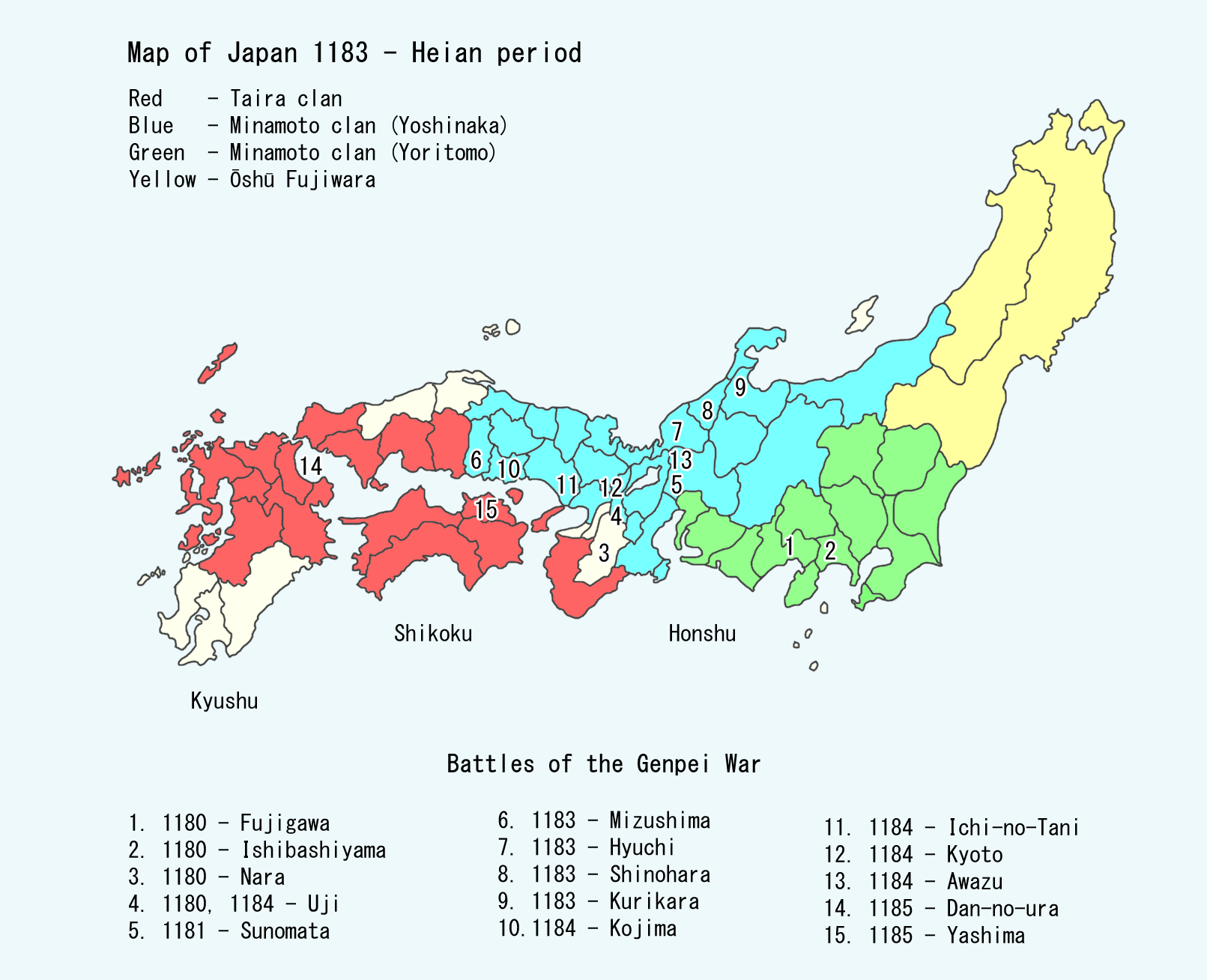
Genpei war

Sasaki Yoshikiyo was born the fifth son of Sasaki Hideyoshi, who was the head of the Sasaki clan of Uda-Genji (Uda-Gen clan), based in Sasaki-no-sho, Gamo-gun Manor in Ōmi Province. His father Hideyoshi Sasaki fought against the Taira clan in the Hōgen (1156) and Heiji Wars (1160). Following his defeat in 1160, Hideyoshi was deprived of his feudal estate, and moved away to Sagami Province. Shibuya Shigekuni respected Hideyoshi's bravery and sheltered Hideyoshi in his territory and had his daughter marry Hideyoshi.

Sasaki Yoshikiyo was born in Sagami in 1161 as the fifth son of Sasaki Hideyoshi. His mother was a daughter of Shibuya Shigekuni. Although Yoshikiyo had four elder brothers, they were by different mothers. Yoshikiyo grew up in Sagami, and married a daughter of Ōba Kagechika.

== Early military career ==
When Minamoto no Yoritomo (head of the Genji clan) raised an army to overthrow the Taira clan (Heike) in 1180, Yoshikiyo's half-brothers sided with Yoritomo. Shibuya Shigekuni, who was Yoshikiyo's maternal grandfather, sided with the Taira clan, and Oba Kagechika, who was his father-in-law, became the head of the Tairas' army. Shigekuni's longtime kindness made Hideyoshi unable to make up his mind. As a result, although he sided with the Tairas officially, he sided with Yoritomo in fact. His son Yoshikiyo also worried about the same problem, but he decided to side with the Taira clan finally. Yoshikiyo, who was on the Tairas' side, won the Battle of Ishibashiyama, which turned out to be the first fight of a series of wars. On the other hand, Yoritomo, who was on the Genji side, won the Battle of Kise-gawa, which broke out next. Yoshikiyo surrendered to Yoritomo, and after that, he sided with the Minamotos and fought in the Genpei War. In 1185, the Taira were overthrown in the Battle of Dan-no-ura. After the war ended, his four elder half-brothers were praised for their distinguished military services by Yoritomo, and they got their own feudal estates. But since only Yoshikiyo had been on the enemy side at first, he was not granted any reward. However, he kept on working seriously without resentment.

In 1221, the Jōkyū War broke out. He sided with Bakufu (Kamakura Shoguneto) and won a victory in this war. His distinguished military service and his old achievements were praised by the Bakufu and he became the governor of both Oki Province and Izumo Province.

== Later life ==
When he became the governor of Oki and Izumo he emigrated to Izumo. In 1242, Yoshikiyo died at age 81. Since his posterity prospered there, future generations called him the "founder of the Izumo Genji".

== His family (Izumo Genji clan) ==
- grandfather:Sasaki Tametoshi
  - father:Sasaki Hideyoshi
    - himself:Sasaki Yoshikoyo
      - eldest daughter:Nogi Mitsutsuna's wife
      - adopted son:Nogi Mitsutsuna (Nogi Maresuke's ancestor)
      - eldest son:Sasaki Masayoshi
      - second son:Sasaki Yasukiyo
        - Yasukiyo's eldest son:Oki Yoshishige
        - Yasukiyo's 2nd son:Oki Tokikiyo
        - Yasukiyo's 3rd son:Enya Yoriyasu
        - Yasukiyo's 4th son:Toda Yoshiyasu
        - Yasukiyo's 5th son:Sasaki Shigekiyo
        - Yasukiyo's 6th son:Gotō Motoaki
        - Yasukiyo's 7th son:Sasaki Yorikiyo
        - Yasukiyo's 8th son:Takaoka Muneyasu
        - Yasukiyo's 9th son:Koshi Yoshinobu
        - Yasukiyo's 10th son:Komazaki Kiyomura
        - Yasukiyo's 11th son:Sasaki Kiyoyoshi
        - Yasukiyo's eldest daughter:Momoi Yorinao's wife
        - Yasukiyo's 2nd daughter:Sasaki Munetsune's wife
        - Yasukiyo's 3rd daughter:Azuma Rokurōzaemon's wife

== See also ==
- Sasaki clan
- The Tale of the Heike
- Battle of Ishibashiyama
- Ōba Kagechika
