= Kasai clan =

Kasai clan (葛西氏, Kasai-shi) was a Japanese clan in Mutsu Province.

== History ==
The Kasai clan was established in the 12th century.

In the 17th century, the family were given a monopoly for cleaning the sewer pits of Edo Castle.
