= Minamoto no Masanobu =

Minamoto no Masanobu/Masazane (源 雅信) (920–993), third son of Imperial Prince Atsumi (son of Emperor Uda), a Kugyō (Japanese noble) of the Heian period. His mother was a daughter of Fujiwara no Tokihira. He became Minister of the Left in 978. His daughter Rinshi was married to Fujiwara no Michinaga, when Michinaga was in a far lower position. At first he disputed his daughter's marriage because of Michinaga's position, but his wife Bokushi (穆子) pushed for the marriage. Finally Michinaga became regent of the Emperor, so his wife was redeemed as a good judge of character. Michinaga came into Masazane's residence Tsuchimikado-dono (土御門殿).

He is the progenitor of the Uda Genji (宇多源氏).

== Family ==
- Father: Imperial Prince Atsumi (敦実親王) (893–967)
- Mother: Fujiwara no Tokihira‘s daughter
- Wives:
  - Minamoto no Kintada’s daughter
  - Fujiwara Bokushi (931-1061)
  - Fujiwara no Motokata’s daughter
  - Fujiwara no Tamemitsu’s daughter
- Children:
  - Minamoto no Tokinaka (時中) (943–1002) - first son, progenitor of Niwata family and Ayanokōji family by Minamoto no Kintada’s daughter
  - Minamoto no Sukenori (扶義) (951–998) - fourth son, progenitor of Sasaki clan by Fujiwara no Motokata’s daughter
  - Minamoto no Michinori (通義) (d.998) by Fujiwara no Motokata’s daughter
  - Minamoto no Tokimichi (時通) by Fujiwara Bokushi
  - Minamoto no Tokikata (時方) by Fujiwara Bokushi
  - Minamoto no Tokinobu (時叙) - priest (Jakugen, 寂源) by Fujiwara Bokushi
  - Naritoki (済時)
  - Narinobu (済信) by Minamoto no Kintada’s daughter
  - Saijin (済信) (954–1030) - priest
  - Minamoto no Rinshi (倫子) (964–1053) - married to Fujiwara no Michinaga by Fujiwara Bokushi
  - daughter - married to Imperial Prince Munehira (son of Emperor Murakami)
  - daughter - married to Fujiwara no Sadatoki
  - Naka no Kimi (d.1000) - married to Fujiwara no Michitsuna by Fujiwara Bokushi
