= Mon (emblem) =

Japanese emblems

The mon of the Toyotomi clan, now used as the emblem of the Japanese Government; originally an emblem of the imperial family—a stylized paulownia.

Mon (紋, [mõ̞ꜜɴ]), also called mondokoro (紋所) or kamon (家紋, family mon), are Japanese emblems used to decorate and identify an individual, a family, or an institution. Mon is an encompassing term that may refer to any such device, kamon and mondokoro refer specifically to emblems that are used to identify a family, while shinmon (神紋), shamon (社紋), and jimon (寺紋) identify god, shrine, or temple, respectively. (Note: Mon (紋) is a generic term referring to badges, kabuto crests, company logos, seals, insignia, emblems, and any other such marking device. The term is also used for the designs or patterns on the devices. However, most Japanese speakers would hesitate to use the term for what they perceive to be a foreign or modern device. Monshō (紋章) refers to the 'designs' on all such devices, and applies to all such designs, foreign and domestic, historic or modern.)

A mon reference in 2004 compiles Japan's 241 general categories of mon based on structural resemblance (a single mon may belong to multiple categories), with 5,116 distinct individual mon. (Note: Some 6939 mon are listed here Archived 2016-10-28 at the Wayback Machine.)

It is well acknowledged that there are a number of lost or obscure mon. Among mon, the mon officially used by the family is called jōmon (定紋). Over time, new mon have been created, such as kaemon (替紋), which is secondary or unofficial mon, and onnamon (女紋), which is created for a woman after marriage by modifying part of her original family mon, so that by 2023 there will be a total of 20,000 to 25,000 mon.

The devices are similar to the badges and coats of arms in European heraldic tradition, which likewise are used to identify individuals and families. Mon are often referred to as crests in Western literature, the crest being a European heraldic device similar to the mon in most functions. (Note: The Japanese term Datemono (立物) or more specifically Kashiradate (頭立て), the ornament on top (as opposed to front, side, or back) of kabuto, is synonymous with 'crest' in the original meaning.) Japanese mon influenced Louis Vuitton's monogram designs through Japonisme in Europe in the late 1800s.

== History ==
Popular use of Mon originated in Japan as kamon (family Mon, or "mon of the house") in the mid-Heian period (c. 900–1000) as a way to identify families and pedigree among the nobility. They had a clear social rank order within the class, and when gissha (牛車, bullock cart) (which was the normal means of transportation for the noble) passed each other on the road, the one with the lower status had to give way. So the mon was indicated on the gissha as the practical status symbol. The Heiji Monogatari Emaki, an emakimono (絵巻物, picture scroll) depicting the Heiji rebellion (January–February 1160), shows kamon painted on gissha:

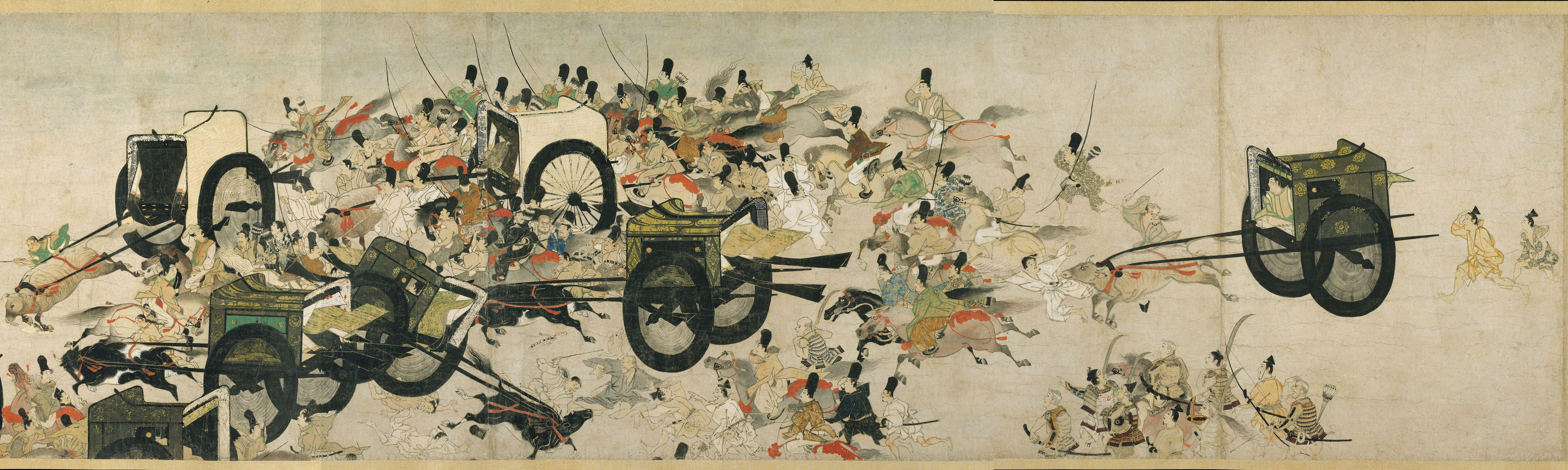
A scene from the Heiji Monogatari Emaki showing several gissha (牛車, bullock cart) with mon fleeing a battle; the mon with nine spheres is called 九曜紋 (kuyō-mon), (Note: The nine spheres represent the Sun, Moon, Mercury, Venus, Mars, Jupiter, Saturn, and the two heavenly bodies that cause the disappearance of the Moon (new moon, or lunar eclipse) and the Sun (solar eclipse), originally in Hindu mythology. See Grahana for details.) which was believed to ward off evil. The mon of cranes represented good fortune, longevity, and prosperity of the descendants.

The nobility began to use mon on their own wardrobe, and the Samurai class that emerged in the late Heian period and came to power in the Kamakura period (1185–1333) followed suit. By the 12th century, sources give a clear indication that heraldry had been implemented as a distinguishing device, especially for use in battle. It is seen on flags, tents, and equipment. On the battlefield, mon served as army standards, even though this usage was not universal and uniquely designed army standards were just as common as mon-based standards (cf. sashimono, uma-jirushi). When heraldry is meant to describe the system of armorial bearings, Mon thus predate heraldry in the country by at least 100-150 years. (Note: Note the group of samurai, in the early stage of their class establishment, is depicted without Mon on their armor in the lower right of the above picture.)

Gradually, mon spread to the lower classes, and in the Muromachi period (1336–1573), merchants painted emblems on their shop signs, which became mon. In the Edo period (1603–1867), kabuki actors used mon, and the general public was allowed to choose and use their favorite mon. By the Genroku period (1680–1709) in the early Edo period, the use of mon was fully established among the general public. However, the use of the chrysanthemum mon used by the imperial family and the hollyhock mon used by the Tokugawa shogunate was prohibited. Mon were also adapted by various organizations, such as merchant and artisan guilds, temples and shrines, theater troupes, and even criminal gangs. They served as a useful means for recognition, especially among the illiterate. (Note: Literacy rate in Japan in the Edo period was one of the highest in the world, second only to Sweden (in reading ability) and a part of Germany. It was supported by an estimated 24,000 Terakoya and other private elementary schools and classes across the country, providing the foundation for higher educational institutions.)

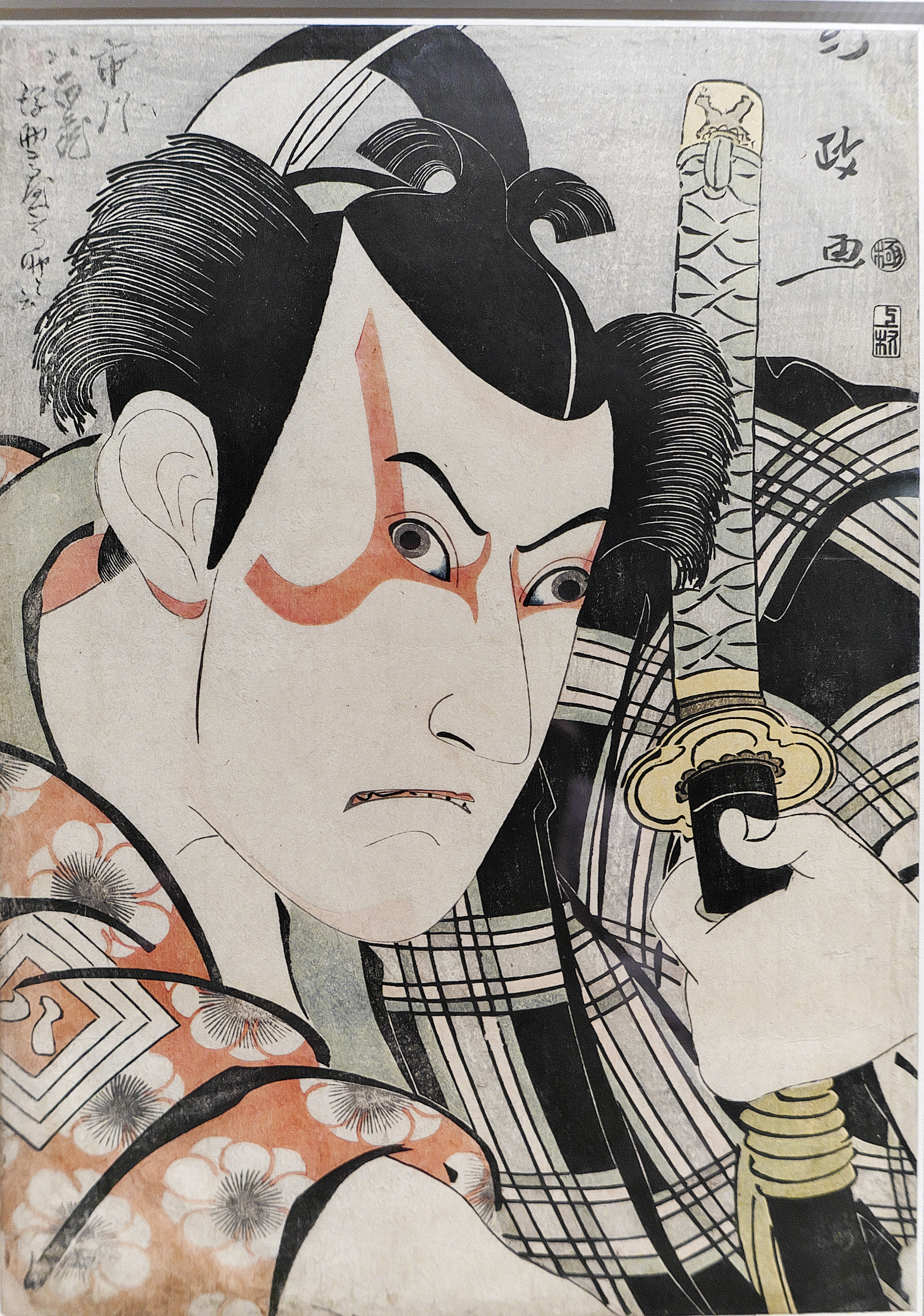
The mon on the right sleeve of the kimono of Kabuki actor Ichikawa Yaozo III, dressed as Umeōmaru. The kanji 八, meaning 'eight', is written within the triple square. Ukiyo-e (woodblock print) by Utagawa Kunimasa, 1796.

The imperial crest of Japan—a stylized chrysanthemum blossom

The mon of the Tokugawa shogunate, three hollyhock leaves inside a circle

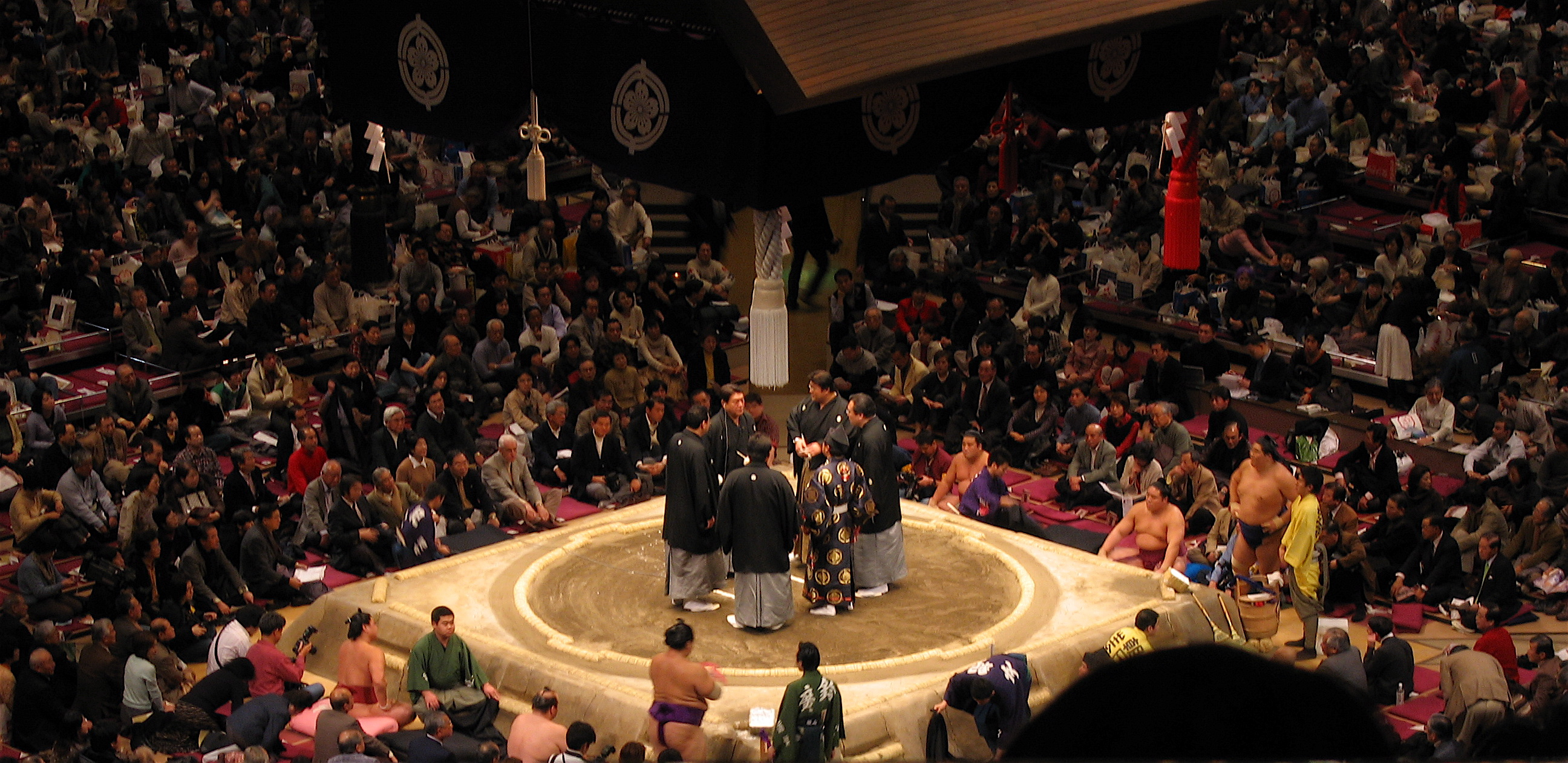
Judges in formal attire and a referee with Mon during an arbitration on the Sumō stage on 21 January 2007. The small white Mon are 'Kamon' for identification on the formal attire, but are decoration on the referee costume (which may or may not be kamon). The mon on the banner above are the corporate logo of the Japan Sumo Association.

Japanese traditional formal attire generally displays the kamon of the wearer's family. Commoners without kamon often used those of their patron or the organization they belonged. In cases when none of those were available, they sometimes used one of the few mon which were seen as "vulgar", or invented or adapted whatever mon they wished, passing it on to their descendants. It was not uncommon for shops to adopt/develop mon to identify themselves and their products/services.

Occasionally, patrons granted the use of their kamon to their retainers as a reward. Similar to the granting of the patron's surname, this was considered a very high honor. Alternatively, the patron may have added elements of its mon to that of the retainer and granted the use, or chosen an entirely different mon for them.

== Design ==
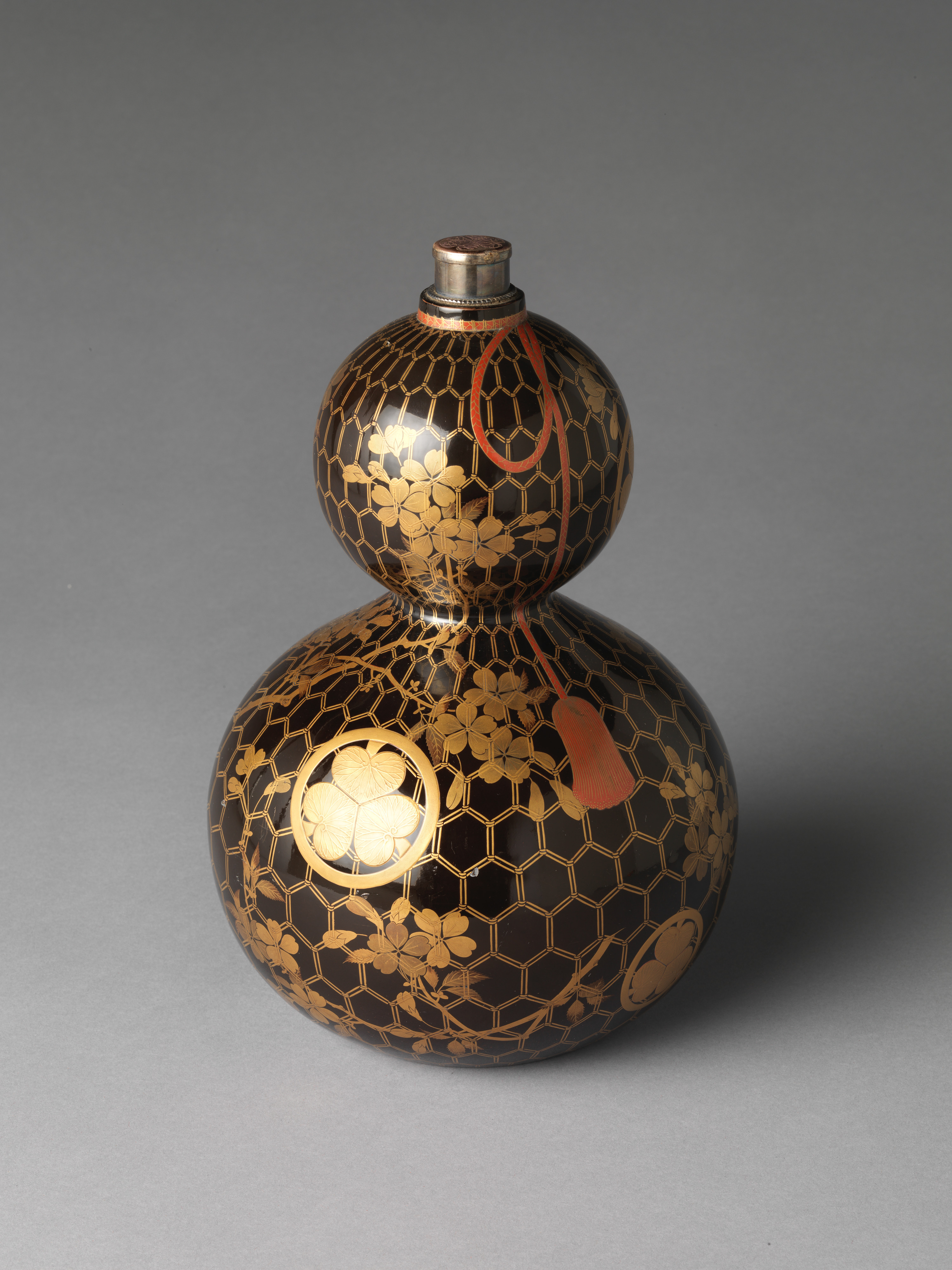
蒔絵 (Maki-e) sake bottle with Tokugawa clan's mon, 18th century, Edo period

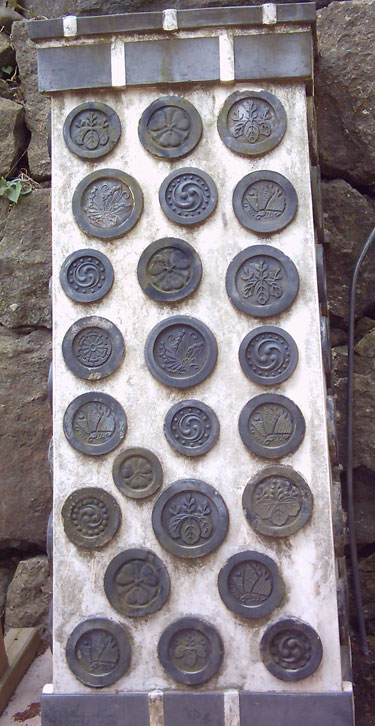
Various kamon on display at Himeji Castle

Mon motifs can be broadly classified into five categories: animals, plants, nature, buildings and vehicles, and tools and patterns, each with its own meaning. The most common animal motifs are the crane and the turtle (often depicted as a hexagon representing the turtle shell), which, according to tradition, were symbols of longevity and were used to wish the family a long and prosperous life. Plant mon were symbols of wealth and elegance, so they were often used to wish for the improvement of the family's social status and economic power, and motifs such as wisteria and paulownia were often used. Mon depicting buildings, vehicles, or tools often indicated occupation or status. For example, a mon with a torii gate indicated a family associated with Shintō, a mon with a gissha wheel indicated nobility, and a mon with a nail puller indicated a family associated with construction. The mon of nature was a symbol of respect for nature and prayers for a good harvest, and motifs such as the moon, mountains, and thunder were used.

The most commonly used mon motifs are wisteria, paulownia, hawk feathers, flowering quince, and creeping woodsorrel, which are called the godaimon (五大紋, five major mon). However, according to a dictionary of mon published by Shōgakukan, oak is listed instead of paulownia. There are more than 150 types of wisteria mon, and their use by the Fujiwara clan led to their popularization.

Similar to the blazon in European heraldry, mon are also named by the content of the design, even though there is no set rule for such names. Unlike in European heraldry, however, this "blazon" is not prescriptive —the depiction of a mon does not follow the name— instead, the names only serve to describe the mon. The pictorial depictions of the mon are not formalized, and small variations of what is supposed to be the same mon can sometimes be seen, but the designs are, for the most part, standardized through time and tradition. At the same time, some small differences, such as a bird in the mon is depicted with an open or closed beak, can be significant, making the versions unique.

Pattern variations of Wisteria Mon

Eda Fuji, single Wisteria with stem

Kujō Sagari Fuji, double, flowers only, drooping down

Kikkō Kumai Fuji no Ha, nine leaves, leaves only, in Kikkō hexagon

Migi Mawari Katatate Tomoe Fuji, single, right-turn, drooping up

Chigai Fuji, crossed double, drooping up

Chigai Sagari Fuji, crossed double, drooping down

Hana Fuji Guruma, octuple, facing-out, wheel

Jiku Tsuki Fuji no Maru, with stem, flowers only, circle

Mukai Fuji Bishi, split double, facing-in, rhombus

Kuroda Fuji Domoe, triple, left-turn, in Tomoe shape

Wari Fuji no Hana, split, detail extraction

The degree of variation tolerated differs from mon to mon as well. For example, the paulownia crest with 5-7-5 flowers is reserved for the prime minister, whereas paulownia with fewer flowers could be used by anyone. The imperial chrysanthemum also specifies 16 petals, whereas chrysanthemum with fewer petals are used by other lesser imperial family members.

Japanese heraldry does not have a cadency or quartering system, but it is not uncommon for cadet branches of a family to choose a slightly different mon from the senior branch. Each princely family (shinnōke), for example, uses a modified chrysanthemum crest as their mon. Mon holders may also combine their mon with that of their patron, benefactor or spouse, sometimes creating increasingly complicated designs.

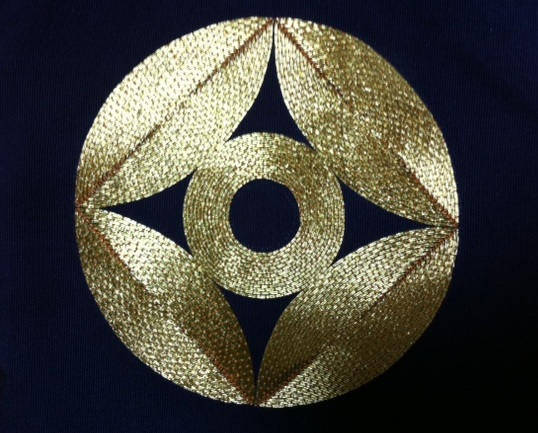
Shippō ni Janome. Application by embroidering

Mon are essentially monochrome; the color does not constitute part of the design, and they may be drawn in any color. (Note: One of the exceptions is the Shinmon used for 七面大明神 (Shichimen Daimyōjin) by Nanbu Sanenaga, which is specifically red Janome on white.) Inverting the black and white on the monochrome image is called 地抜き (Jinuki), sometimes making the inverted mon unique, but most mon can be used both ways on dark or light-colored background. When both ways are used, white body on black background (the two kamon in the Mitsubishi example below) is normally called the formal 日向紋 (Hinata Mon), and black body or lines on white background (all the examples in the above Pattern variations) is the less formal 影紋 (Kage Mon). Probably because the application on the normally black formal Haori (called the 紋付 (Montsuki) "with mon") is the main usage.

Mon add and decide formality of a kimono. A kimono may have one, three or five mon, with the formality ranging from the least formal single 'shadow' (影 (kage)) crest (which is more formal than a kimono without a mon) to the most formal five "facing the Sun" (日向 (hinata)) crests. The most formal display is the 日向紋 (Hinata mon) (Note: This practically limits the most formal kimono (except Hakama trousers) to be in black or in dark color.) on both sides of the chest, on the back of each sleeve, and in the middle of the back. On the armor of a warrior, it might be found on the 兜 (kabuto) (helmet), on the 胴 (dō) (breast plate), and on flags and various other places such as coffers, tents, fans, and other items of importance.

On kimono, typical applications start with a partial removal (抜き (nuki)) of base color or patterns, (Note: See this picture for the back part of a kimono during the mon application process.) then the mon is dyed-on. Other application methods include painting (描き (kaki)) and embroidering (縫い (nui)).

== Modern usage ==
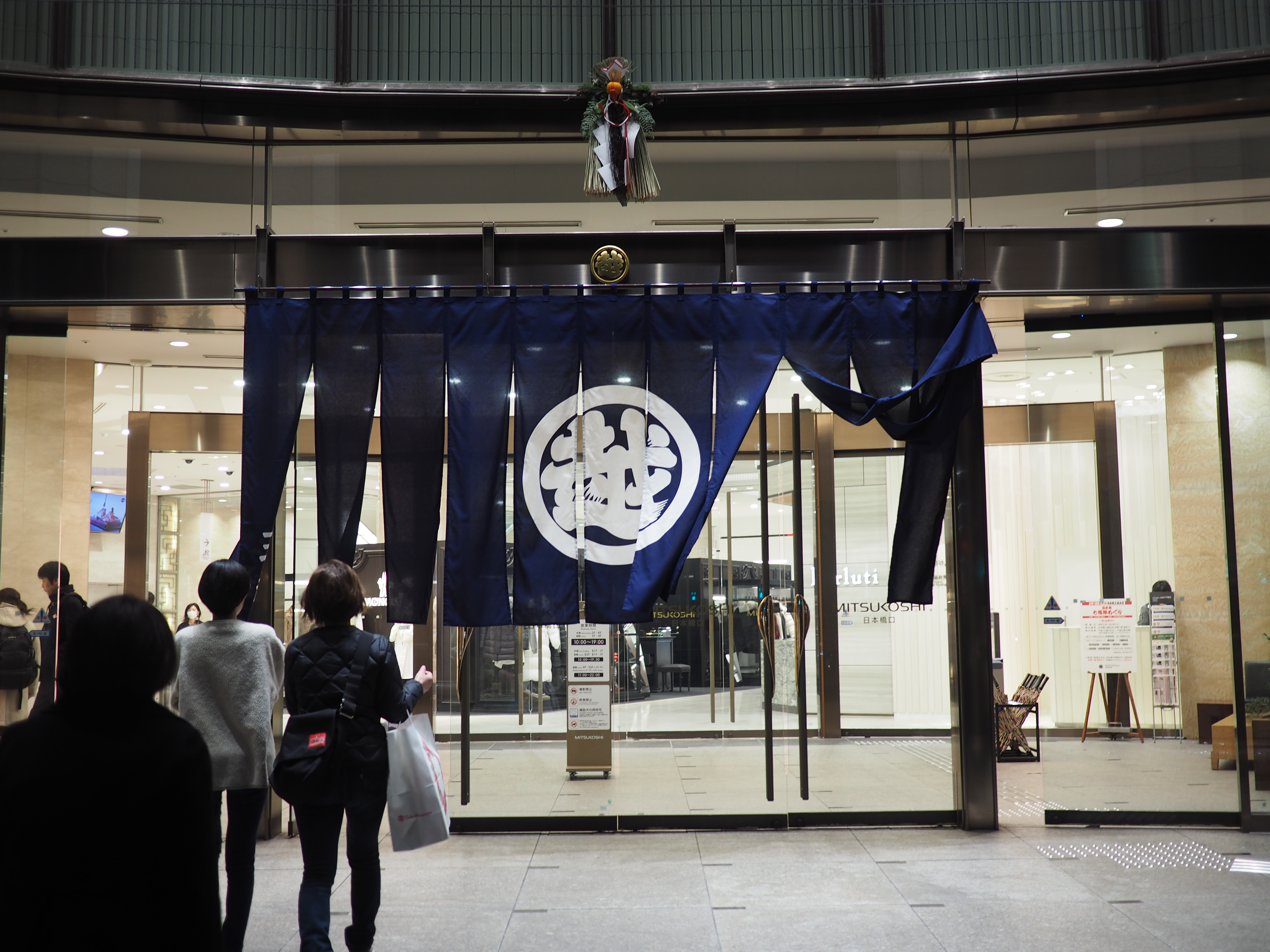
Entrance of a Mitsukoshi department store during a New Year's holiday season. Mitsukoshi logo is on Noren Japanese banner, displayed in the traditional shop-front style prevalent from the 18th century, indicating "Open for Business".

Virtually all modern Japanese families have a mon, but unlike before the Meiji Restoration when rigid social divisions existed, mon play a more specialized role in everyday life. On occasions when the use of a kamon is required, one can try to look up their families in the temple registries of their ancestral hometown or consult one of the many genealogical publications available. Many websites also offer kamon lookup services. Professional wedding planners, undertakers and other "ritual masters" may also offer guidance on finding the proper kamon.

Mitsubishi logo, created by combining two Kamon

Mikai Bishi, the family Mon of Iwasaki Yatarō, the founder of Mitsubishi.

Tosa Kashiwa. Mon (藩紋 (hanmon)) of Tosa Domain, where Iwasaki was from.

Mitsu Bishi, the logo of Mitsubishi, "three diamonds (rhombuses)"

Mon are seen widely in stores and shops engaged in traditional crafts and specialties. They are favored by sushi restaurants, which often incorporate a mon into their logos. Mon designs can be seen on the ceramic roof tiles of older houses, or sometimes on excavated roof tile fragments of ancient castles and temples. Mon designs frequently decorate senbei, sake, tōfu and other packaging for food products to lend them an air of elegance, refinement and tradition. The paulownia mon appears on the obverse side of the 500 yen coin.

Items symbolizing family crafts, arts, or professions were often chosen as a mon; likewise, mon were, and still are, also passed down a lineage of artisans. Geisha typically wear the mon of their Okiya (geisha house) on their clothing when working; individual geisha districts, known as Hanamachi, also have their own distinctive mon, such as the plover crest (Chidori mon) of Ponto-chō in Kyōto.

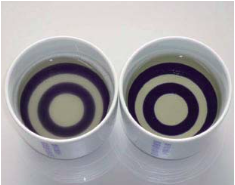
Tasting Sake cups with Janome (snake eye) mon on the inside bottom for quality checking by 杜氏(Toji), the Sake brewing artisans. (Note the Sake in the right cup is slightly clearer.)

A woman may still wear her maiden mon if she wishes and pass it on to her daughters; she does not have to adopt her husband's or father's mon. Flowers, trees, plants and birds are also common elements of mon designs.

As in the past, modern mon are not regulated by law, except the imperial chrysanthemum crest, which doubles as the national emblem, and the paulownia, which is the mon of the office of prime minister and also serves as the emblem of the cabinet and government (see national emblems of Japan for further information). Some local governments and associations may use a mon as their logo or trademark, thus enjoying its traditional protection, but otherwise mon are not recognized by law. One of the best-known examples of a mon serving as a corporate logo is that of Mitsubishi, a name meaning 'three lozenges' (occasionally translated as 'three buffalo nuts'), which are represented as rhombuses.

== In Western heraldry ==
Japanese mon are sometimes used as charges or crests in Western heraldry. They are blazoned in traditional heraldic style rather than in the Japanese style. Examples include the swastika with arrows used by Japanese ambassador Hasekura Tsunenaga, the Canadian-granted arms of the Japanese-Canadian politician David Tsubouchi, and Akihito's arms as a Knight of the Garter.

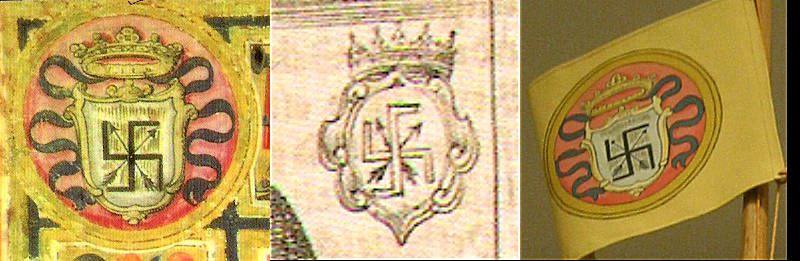
The swastika with arrows used by the 17th-century Japanese ambassador Hasekura Tsunenaga

Western arms of Akihito as a Knight of the Garter, using his mon as both a charge and a crest

== Gallery of representative Mon by theme ==
=== Imperial mons ===
Imperial crest of Japan & mon of the Emperor

Mon of the Akisino branch of the Imperial House

Mon of the Hitachi branch of the Imperial House

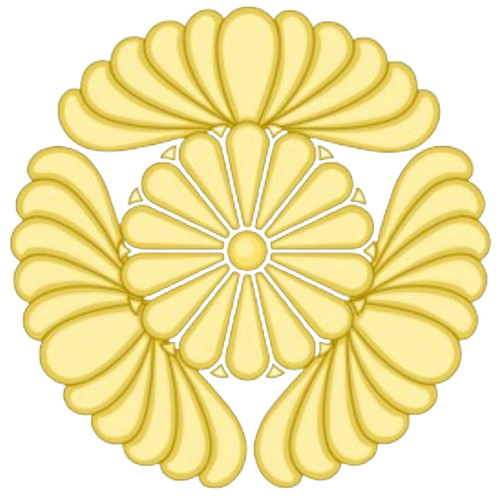
Mon of the Takamatsu branch of the Imperial House

Mon of the Mikasa branch of the Imperial House

Mon of the Takamado branch of the Imperial House

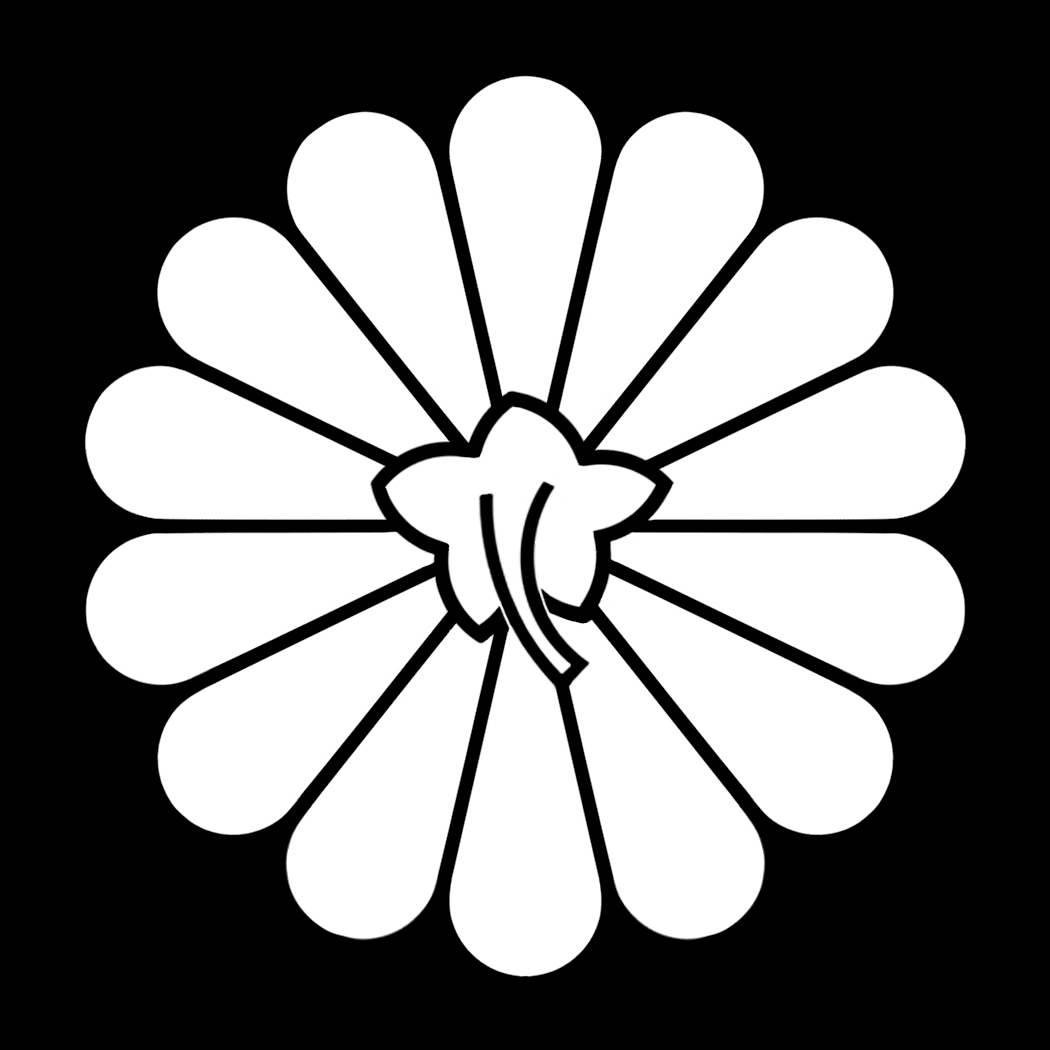
Mon of the Fushimi cadet branch of the Imperial House

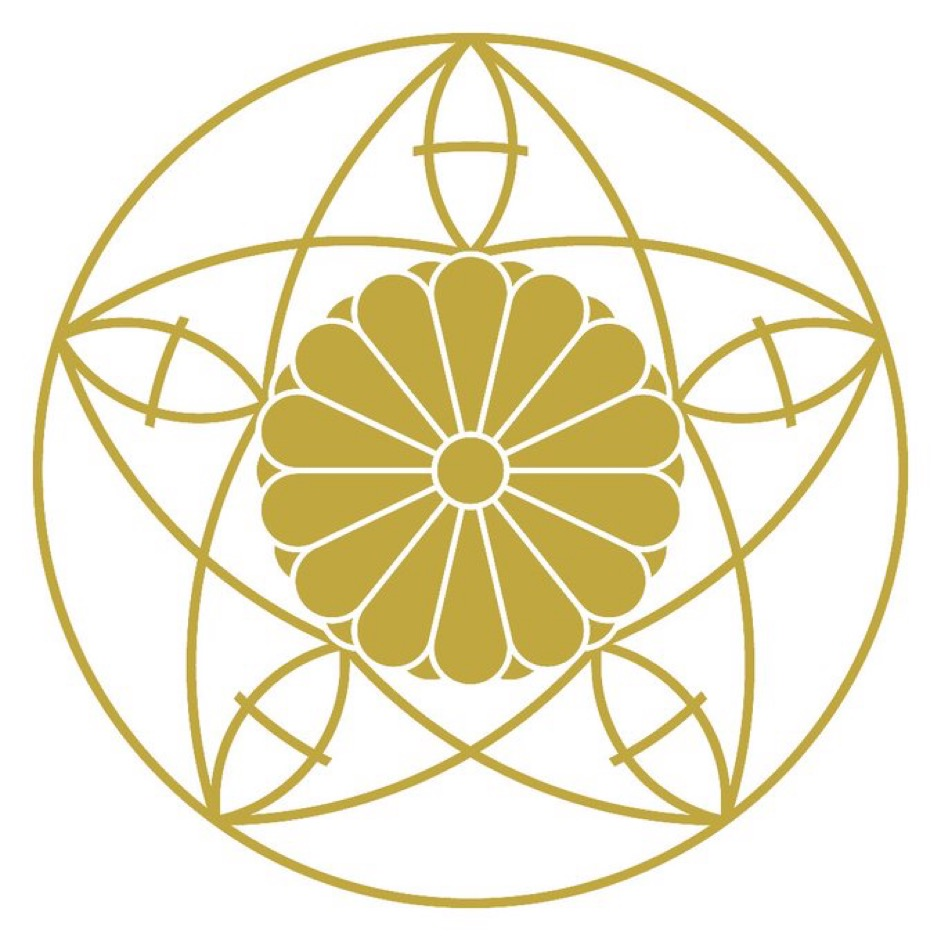
Mon of the Hachijō cadet branch of the Imperial House

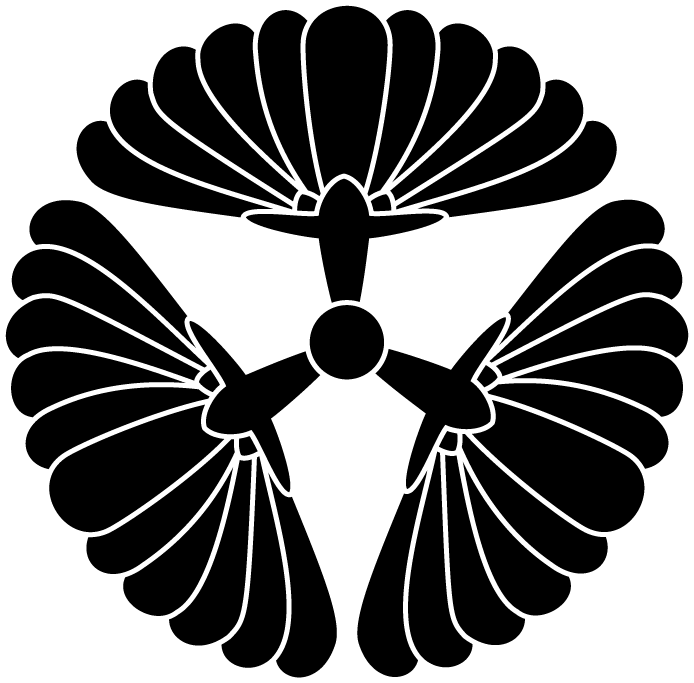
Mon of the Takahito cadet branch of the Imperial House

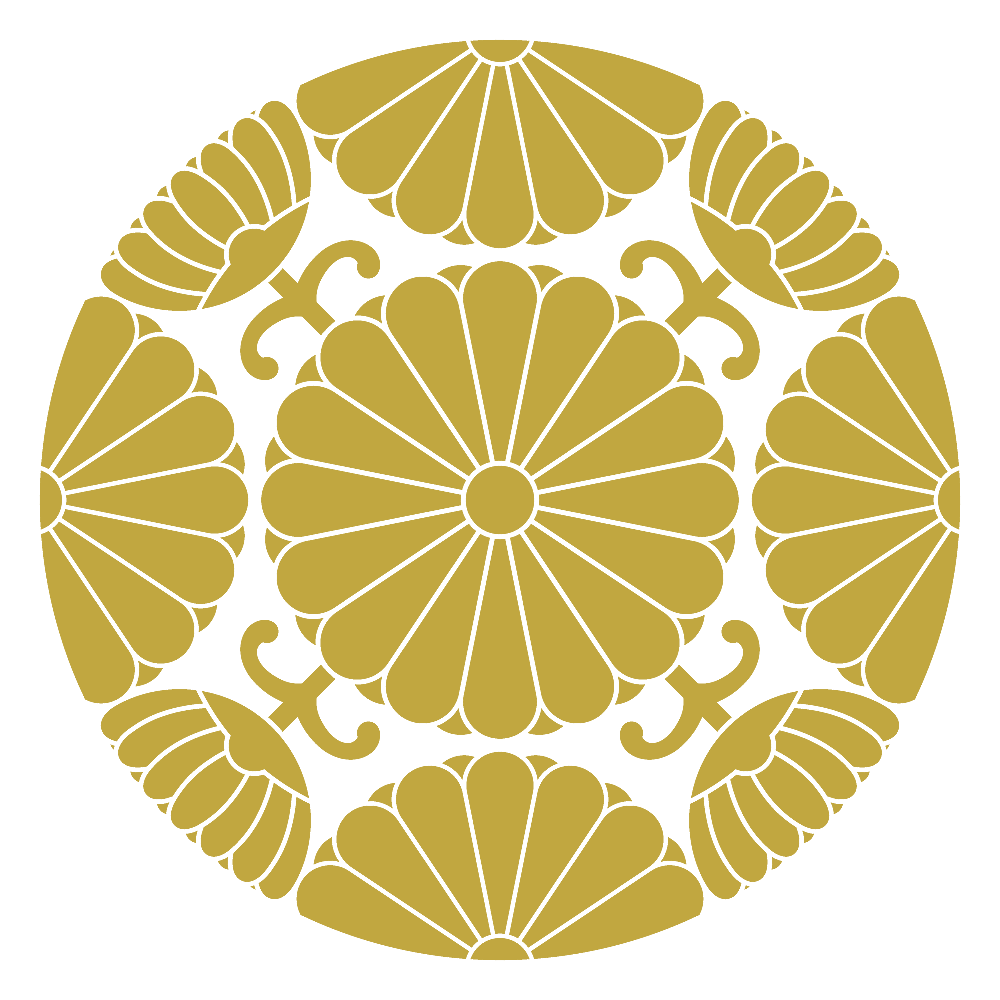
Mon of the Kaninnomiya cadet branch of the Imperial House

=== Animal motif ===
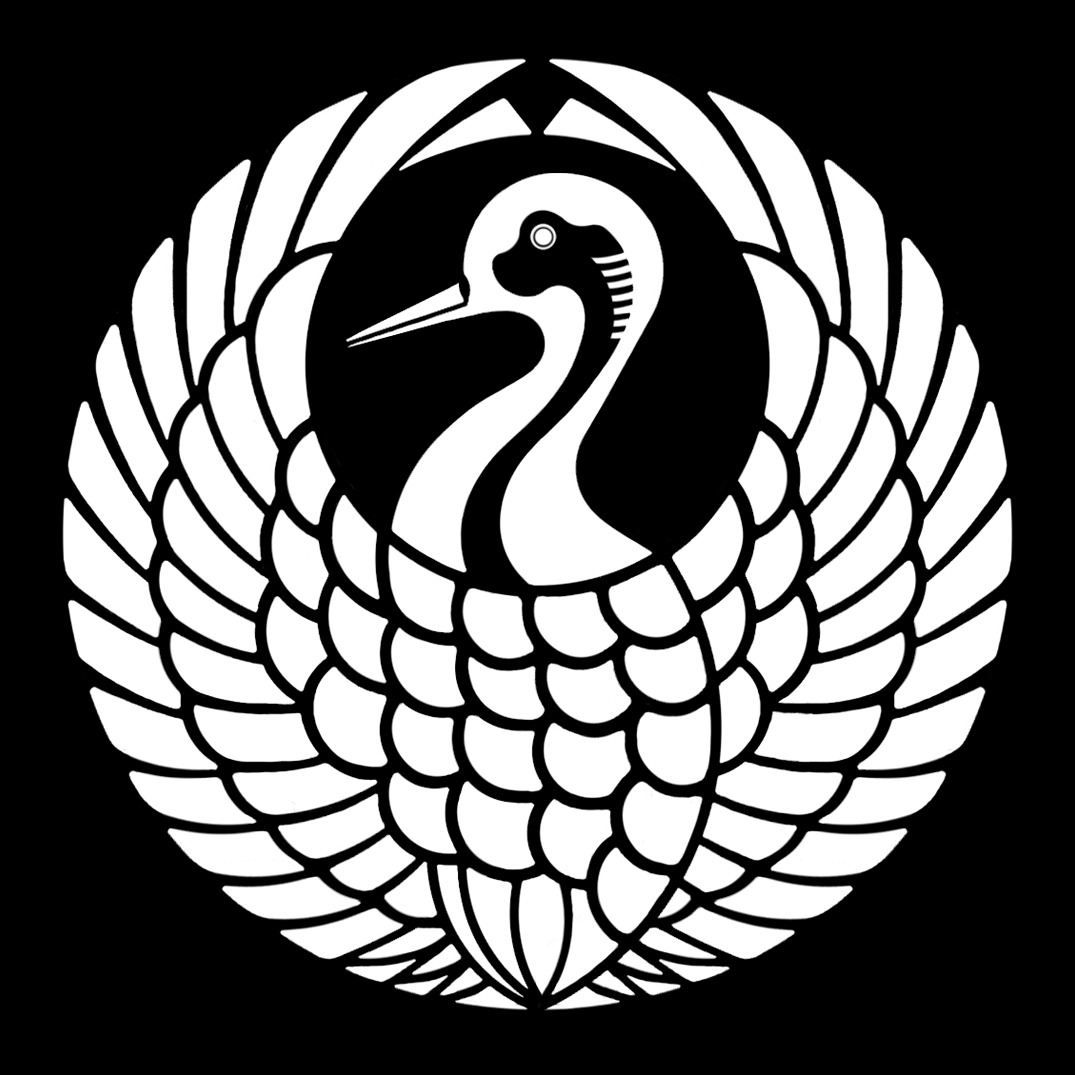
Crane crest of the Mori clan (similar to Japan Airlines)

Triple crane crest

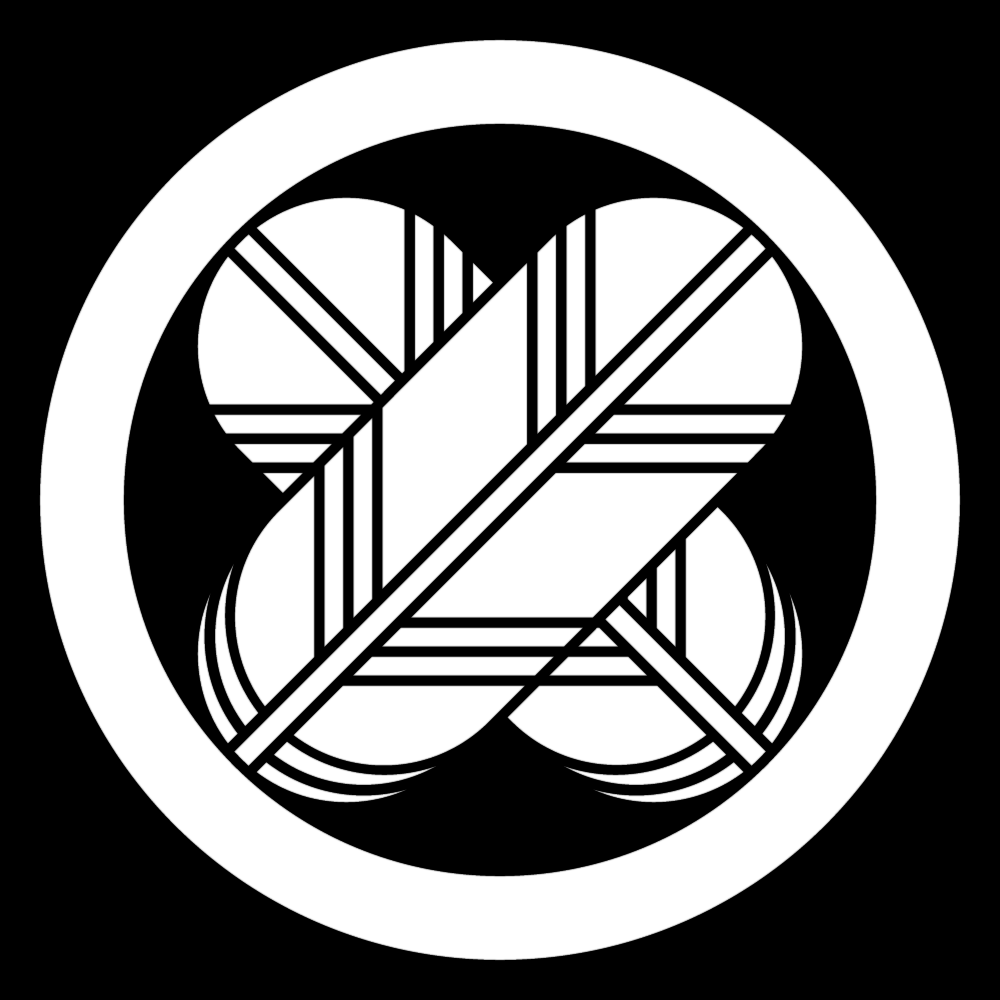
Maru ni Chigai Takanoha, the crossing pair of hawk feathers in circle

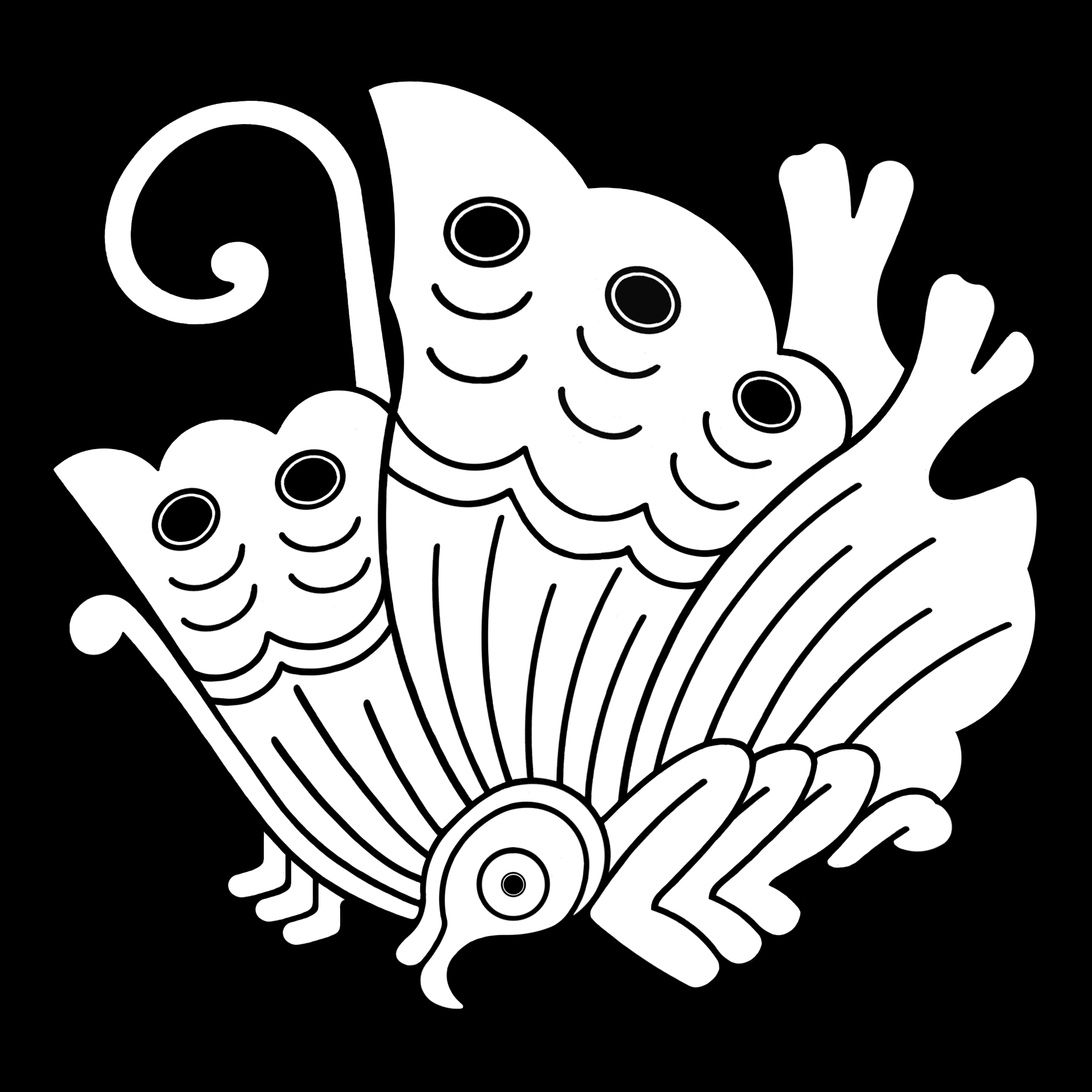
Ageha no Chō, the swallowtail butterfly crest of the Taira clan

Mythical Yatagarasu three-legged crow

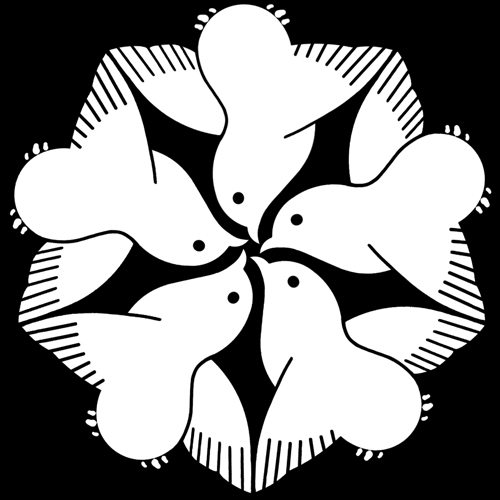
Quintuple Chidori bird mon

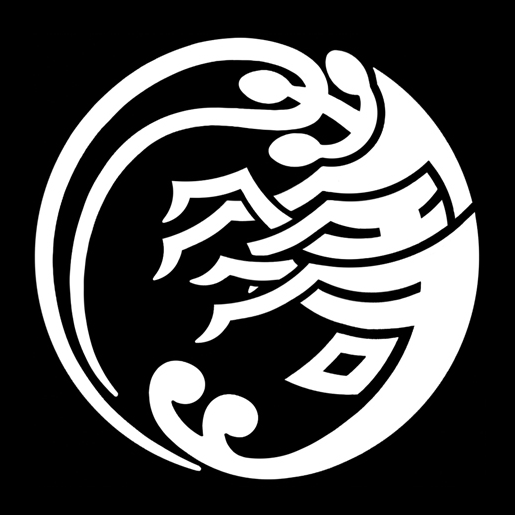
Kotobuki Ebi, auspicious Ise Ebi prawn

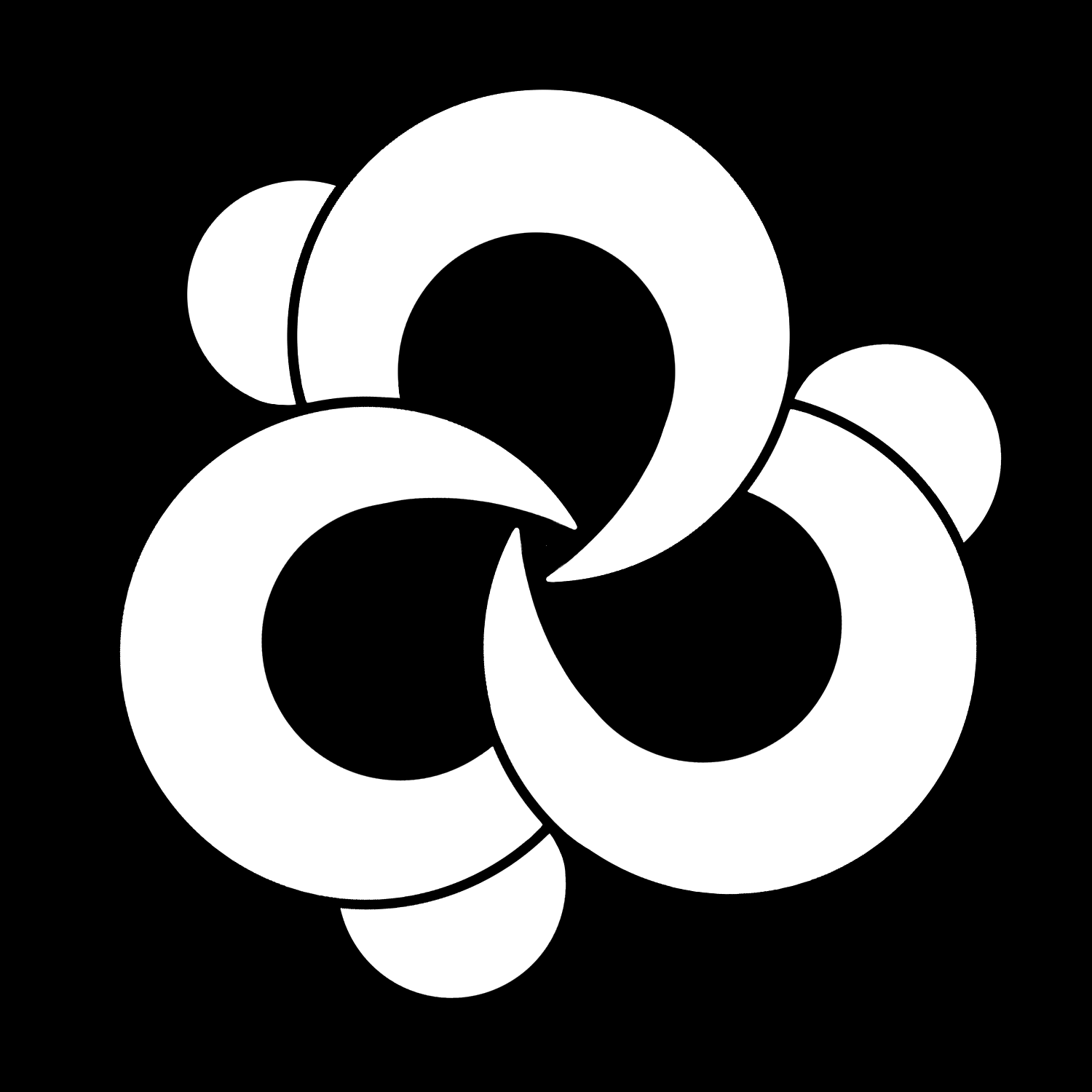
Triple tied Kōshin old world monkeys (Note: See the gate ornament below the name plate in this picture showing the shape of a tied-up and hung monkey as a lucky scapegoat. Also see this picture.)

=== Flower and Plant motif ===
Sagari Fuji (drooping Wisteria), shamon of Kasuga-Taisha shrine and kamon of Fujiwara clan

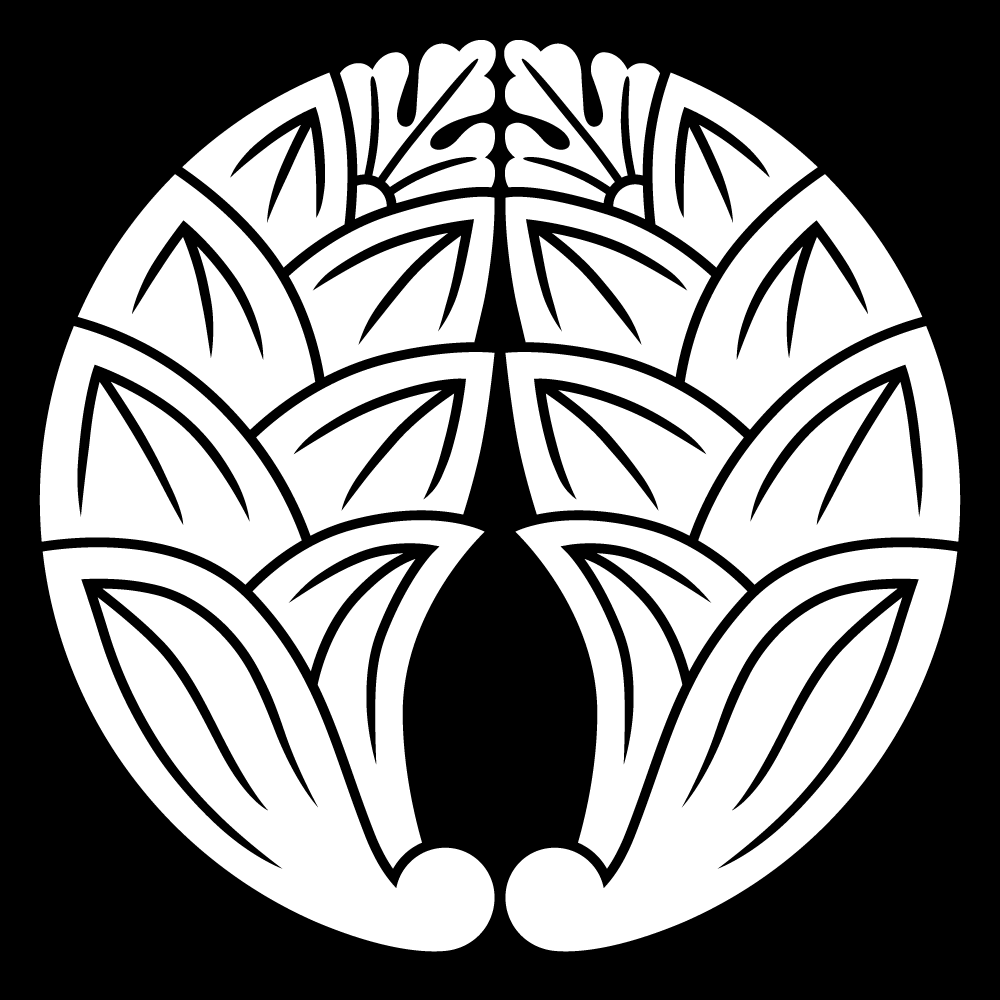
Daki Myōga, Embracing Myōga (Zingiber/Z. mioga) buds, shamon of Nikkō Tōshō-gū shrine

Sasa Rindō, the bamboo leaves and gentian flowers, crest of the Minamoto clan

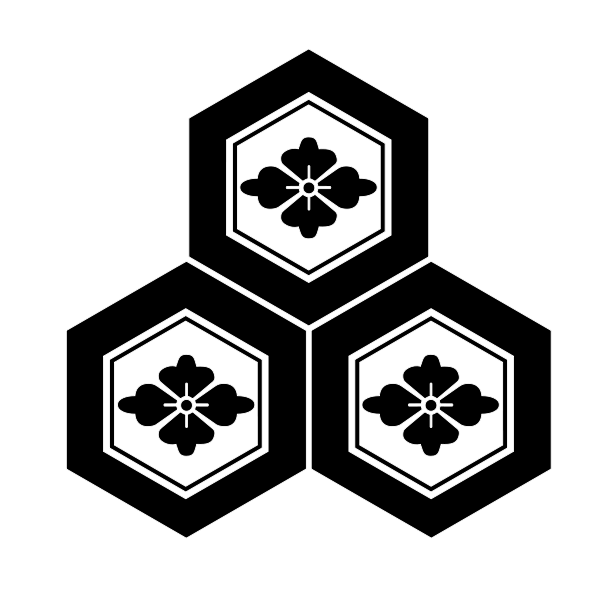
Flower rhombus in three Kikkō (亀甲, turtle shell hexagon), crest of Azai clan

Sumikiri Kaku ni Hanakaku (隅切り角に花角紋)

Tachi Omodaka or upright threeleaf arrowhead (sagittaria trifolia)

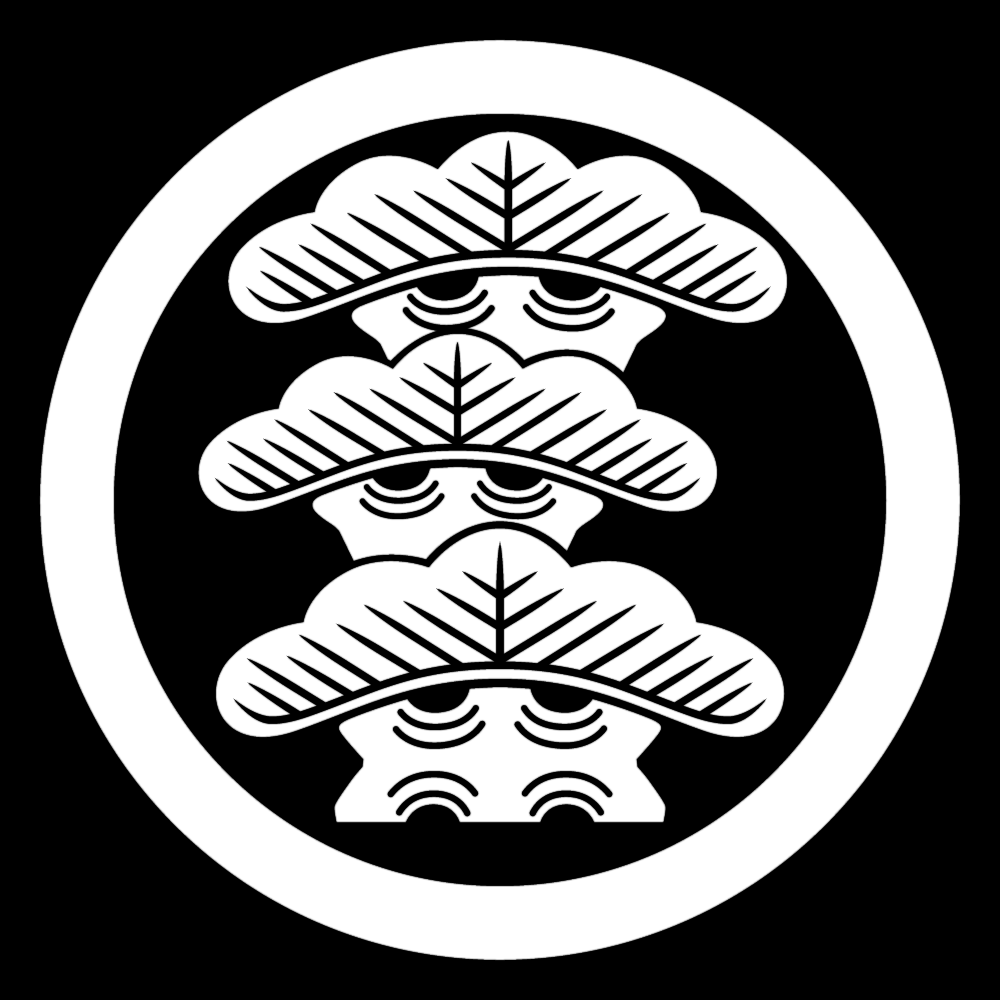
Triple pine tree (Maru ni Hidari Mikai Matsu) of the Hira clan, member of Taira clan (Heike)

Mitsu Gumi Tachibana (triple Tachibana orange) (Note: See ja:タチバナ#家紋 (in Japanese) for info.)

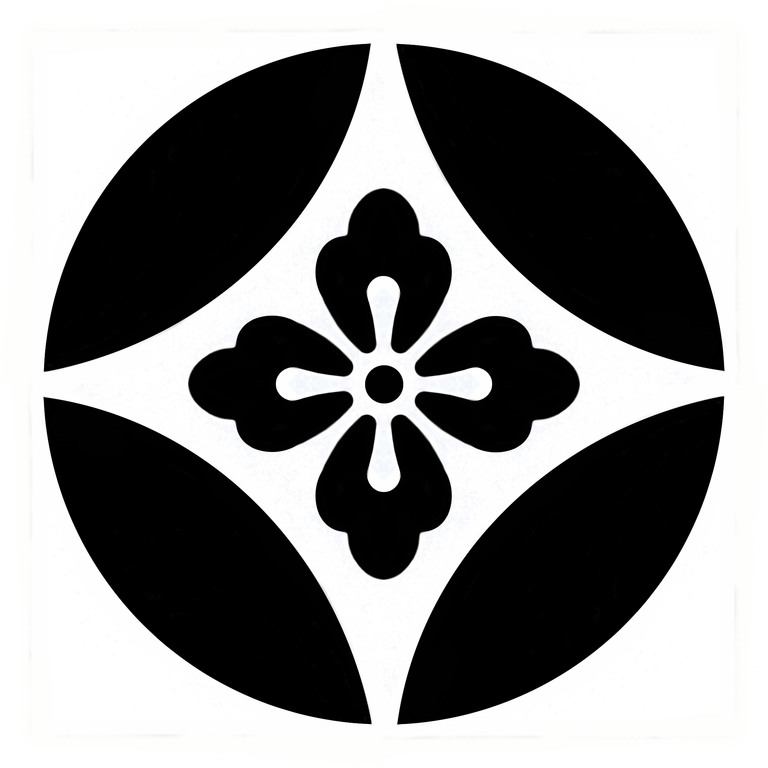
Hanawa Chigai, the device of the Izumo Genji clans (Oki, Enya, Takaoka domains)

Yotsu Hanabishi, the emblem of the Yanagisawa clan, Matsumoto family of kabuki actors

Sparrows and bamboo (Take ni Suzume) of the Date clan

Boke quince flower of Mokkō Mon (木瓜紋)

=== Astronomy motif ===
Yatsuashi Hiashi mon of the Kikuchi clan (eight sun-rays)

三光紋 (Sankō mon) (Three lights. The Sun, Moon and Star), 神紋 (Shinmon) of 妙見菩薩 (Myōken Bosatsu), the North Star deity of Taoist Big Dipper worship and Shintō, used by Chiba Shrine.

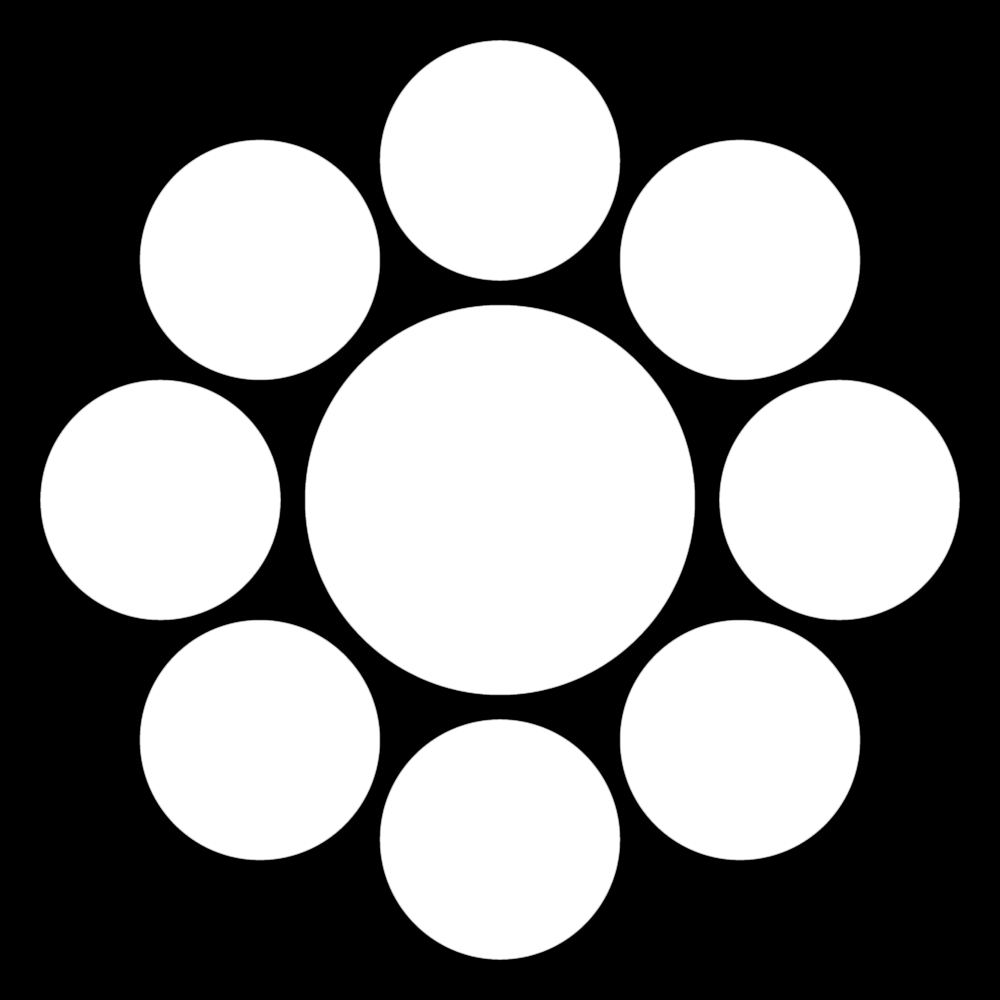
九曜紋 (Kuyō mon), the kamon of Date Masamune, Ishida Mitsunari, Hosokawa Tadaoki, and shamon of Chiba Shrine.

Kokumochi Jinuki Hidari Mitsu Domoe (thunder) (Note: See Tomoe#Tomoe emblem history in Japan for details.)

Pentagram seal of Abe no Seimei

=== Tools motif ===
Chigai Kuginuki (Two nail pullers interlocked)

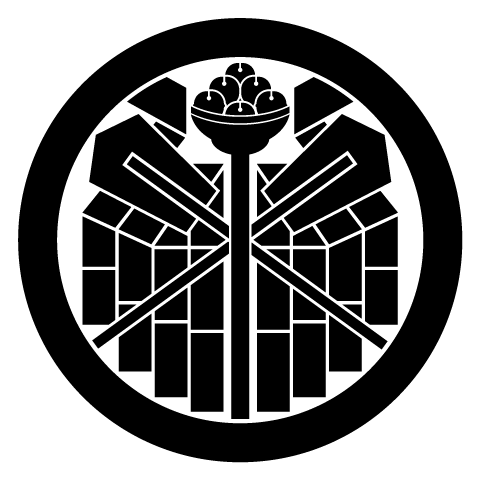
Suzu Gohei (Bells and gohei) used in Shintō rituals

6 coin kamon of Unno and Sanada clan, representing tolls for Six Paths of reincarnation. (Note: This meaning is not well known in modern Japan, and the design is commonly called the 六文銭 (Rokumonsen) out of the belief that the toll for crossing the Sanzu River is 6 Mon. The correct name of this mon is 六道銭 (Rokudōsen) or 六連銭 (Rokurensen).)

Hi no Maru-emblazoned foldable hand fan representing Japan, crest of Satake clan

Tang dynasty-style Gunbai fan of Okudaira clan in Kuwana Domain

Gion Mamori shield motif. The motif is an amulet distributed by Yasaka Shrine to worship Gozu Tennō

=== Geometric motif ===
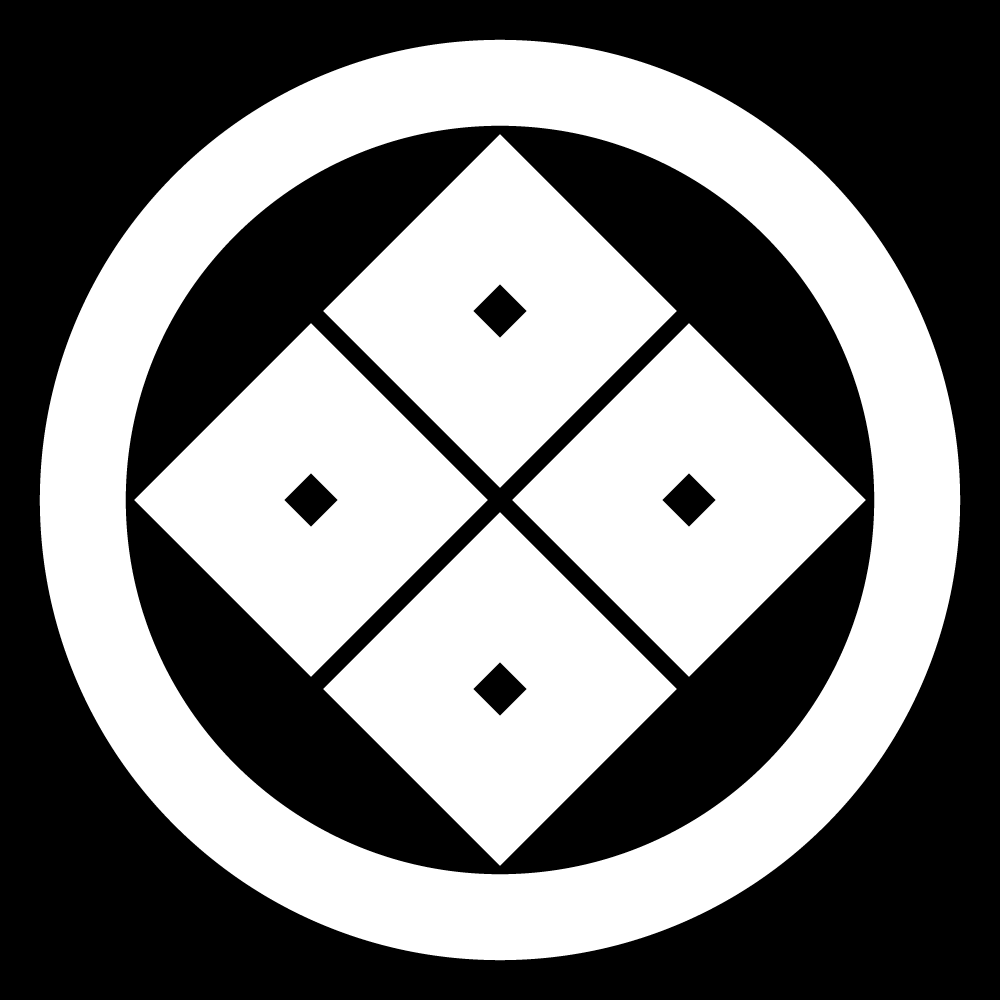
Maru ni Sumitate Yotsume, circle and four eyelets on the edge, of the Uda Genji

Nakagawa Kurusu (Cross of Nakagawa) The secondary mon of the Nakagawa clan. (Note: It is hypothesized that this design is patterned after the Kabuto crest of a respected Christian adversary, Wada Koremasa. See Tarosuke (9 March 2014). "中川クルスについてのお話＆中川etc" [Tales on Nakagawa Cross] (in Japanese). for info.)

Yama Bishi, the crest of the Yamaguchi-gumi yakuza clan. The motif is based on the kanji for yama (山, mountain).

Swastika, or Manji Mon of the Hachisuka clan. This is also the 寺紋 (jimon) of Kinryū-zan Sensō-ji, the oldest temple in Tōkyō.

Mitsu Uroko mon of the Hōjō clan

=== Building and vehicle motifs ===
Torii of Shintō shrine

Gissha (牛車, bullock cart) wheel motif called the 源氏車 (Genji Guruma) of Satō clan in Fujiwara no Hidesato-branch of Fujiwara clan

== See also ==
- Coat of arms
- Japanese rebus monogram
- List of Japanese flags
- National emblems of Japan
- Yagō
