= Sasaki clan =

Japanese clan

Sasaki clan 佐々木氏
- The emblem (mon) of the Sasaki clan
- Home province: Ōmi province
- Parent house: Uda Genji; Seiwa Genji
- Titles: Various
- Founder: Minamoto no Nariyori
- Founding year: 10th century
- Ruled until: 1871
- Cadet branches: Rokkaku clan Amago clan Kyōgoku clan Kuroda clan Takashima clan

Sasaki clan (佐々木氏, Sasaki-shi) are a historical Japanese clan.

== History ==
They are descended directly from Emperor Uda (868–897) by his grandson Minamoto no Masazane (920–993) (Uda Genji), but were adopted by the Seiwa Genji. Minamoto no Nariyori, great-grandson of Masazane, is the first who took the name of Sasaki from his domain in Ōmi province (now Shiga).

Hideyoshi (1112–1184), descendant of Minamoto no Nariyori, lost his parents young and became an orphan. He was adopted by Minamoto no Tameyoshi (then head of the Seiwa Genji). He participated in the Hōgen war (1156) in which his father Minamoto no Tameyoshi was killed, and the Heiji war (1159) with his (adoptive) uncles, brothers, nephews, cousins and clansmen. After his brother Minamoto no Yoshitomo was killed (1160), and the defeat of the Seiwa Genji, he went North to ask Fujiwara no Hidehira of Mutsu province to give him shelter, but stopped at Shibuya (Sagami province) and remained at that place for 20 years. When his nephew Minamoto no Yoritomo rose in revolt against the Taira, he with his four sons sided with him (1180). He was killed during the Genpei war (1180-1185) at the battle of Ōhara (1184) in Ōmi province fighting against the Taira clan. His descendants received from their Seiwa Genji cousins the title of shugo (governor) of Ōmi and other provinces, which they kept until the 16th century Sengoku Period wars. He is the ancestor of the Sasaki, the Rokkaku, the Amago, the Kyōgoku and the Kuroda clans.

In 1868, at the end of the Tokugawa period :

- The Kyōgoku were daimyō of Marugame and Tadotsu in Sanuki Province, Toyooka in Tajima Province, and Mineyama Domain in Tango Province. A branch of the Kyōgoku was ranked among the 26 families which were permitted to fill the office of kōke.
- The Kuroda were daimyō of Fukuoka, and of Akizuki (Chikuzen province).
- The Rokkaku had the rank of Kōke.

There existed a certain Sasaki Shrine where Sasaki Yamagimi, a warlord, worshiped the god of ancestor's spirit. Following the middle of the Heian period (794 - 858), the shrine was used to worship the tutelary god of the Sasaki clan. It is said that through this, the "Ōmi-Genji Festival" is held every year on October 10 in respect of the Sasaki clan. One member of note amongst the Sasaki clan is none other than Sasaki Kojiro, the famous swordsman and rival of Miyamoto Musashi. The favorite technique of Kojiro was his "Tsubame Gaeshi" (Turning Swallow Cut), which he attempted to use on Musashi throughout their duel. It is also known that the Sasaki clan apparently was a political obstacle to that of the Hosokawa, and the defeat of Kojiro would be a political setback to his religious and political foes.

== Genealogy ==
Bold designates a master. The "〇" mark is a person who participated in Minamoto no Yoritomo's rising in arms.

                                  ∴
                                 Emperor Uda(867-931)
                                  ┃
                                 Prince Atsumi(893-967)
                                  ┃
                                 Minamoto no Masazane(920-993)
                                  ┃
                                 Sukenori(951-998)
                                  ┃
                                 Nariyori(976-1003)
                                  ┃
                                 Noritsune(1000-1058)
                                  ┃
                                 Tsunekata
                                  ┃
                                 Tametoshi
                                  ┃
                                 Sasaki Hideyoshi(1112–1184)
                                  ┣━━━━━━┳━━━━━━━┳━━━━━━━┳━━━━━┓
                               〇Sadatsuna  〇Tsunetaka  〇Moritsuna  〇Takatsuna    Yoshikiyo
 ┏━━━━━━┳━━━━━┳━━━━━┫          ┃            ┃             ┃         ┣━━━━━┓
Hirotsuna  Sadashige  Hirosada  Nobutsuna    Takashige    Kaji Nobuzane  Shigetuna  Masayoshi  Yasukiyo
 ┏━━━━━━┳━━━━━━━━━━━╋━━━━━━━━┓                       ┏━━━━━┳━━━━━┫
Shigetsuna　Takanobu　Rokkaku Yasutsuna　Kyogoku Ujinobu                  Yoriyasu　Yoshiyasu　Muneyasu

== See also ==
- Rokkaku clan
- Kyogoku clan
- Sasaki Takauji
- Sasaki Kojiro

== Sources ==
- Iwao, Seiichi, Teizō Iyanaga, Susumu Ishii, Shōichirō Yoshida, et al. (2002). Dictionnaire historique du Japon. Paris: Maisonneuve & Larose. ISBN 978-2-7068-1632-1; OCLC 51096469
- Nussbaum, Louis-Frédéric and Käthe Roth. (2002). Japan Encyclopedia. at Google Books Cambridge: Harvard University Press. ISBN 978-0-674-00770-3 (cloth) -- ISBN 978-0-674-01753-5 (paper)
